= List of schools and libraries in Cumberland, Maryland =

A list of schools and libraries in Cumberland, Maryland:

== Schools ==
- High schools
  - Allegany High School
  - Fort Hill High School
- Private schools
  - Bishop Walsh School
  - Calvary Christian Academy
  - Lighthouse Christian Academy
  - Beginnings Montessori Preschool and Elementary School
- Middle schools
  - Washington Middle School
  - Braddock Middle School
- Elementary schools
  - Bel Air Elementary School
  - John Humbird Elementary School
  - Northeast Elementary School
  - South Penn Elementary School
  - West Side Elementary School
  - Creasptown Elementary School
  - Cash Valley Elementary School
  - Parkside Elementary School
  - Flintstone Elementary School
- Former schools
  - East Side School (1918-1984)

== Area colleges and universities ==
All of those listed are within a short drive from Cumberland, though only one is located in Cumberland itself.

- Allegany College of Maryland (Cumberland and Bedford & Somerset, Pennsylvania)
- Robert C. Byrd Institute (Rocket Center, West Virginia)
- Frostburg State University (Frostburg, Maryland)
- Potomac State College of West Virginia University (Keyser, West Virginia)
- Garrett College (McHenry, Maryland)

== Libraries ==
Approximately 39,000 people hold library cards in Allegany County ("Most citizens give libraries high grades", Cumberland Times News, October 10, 2006). Regional Libraries include:

- Washington Street Library
- Frostburg Public Library
- Lavale Public Library
- South Cumberland Public Library, Allegany County
- Westernport Public Library, Allegany County
- Lewis J. Ort Library (Frostburg State University)
- Allegany College Library
- Western Maryland Public Library System
