= Bahr (surname) =

Bahr is a surname. It may be of Germanic origin, derived from the word "bear" or Arabic literally meaning "sea". Notable people with the surname include:

- Chris Bahr (born 1953), American football placekicker
- Clint Bahr, member of TriPod
- Daniel Bahr (born 1976), German politician (FDP)
- Ed Bahr (1919–2007), Canadian baseball player
- Egon Bahr (1922–2015), German politician (SPD)
- Elexa Bahr (born 1998), Colombian footballer
- Florence Riefle Bahr (1909–1998), American painter
- Frederick John Bahr (1837–1885), American entrepreneur
- Günther Bahr (1921–2009), German flying ace
- Hermann Bahr (1863–1934), Austrian writer
- Iris Bahr, American actress
- Jason Bahr (born 1972), American professional baseball pitcher
- Jean Bahr, American hydrogeologist and professor
- Jerzy Bahr (1944–2016), Polish diplomat
- Kurt Bahr, American businessman and politician from Missouri
- Leonard Bahr (1905–1990), American painter
- Matt Bahr (born 1956), American football placekicker
- Philip Manson-Bahr (born Philip Henry Bahr, 1881–1966), English zoologist and physician
- Ulrike Bahr (born 1964), German politician
- Walter Bahr (1927–2018), American international soccer player
- Kevin J. Bahr (born 1964), American lawyer and philanthropist
- Arthur E. Bahr (born 1935), American engineer and intellectual property lawyer, Director and General Counsel for General Electric/RCA
