= Wright Butler House =

Historic house in Maryland, United States

- U.S. National Register of Historic Places
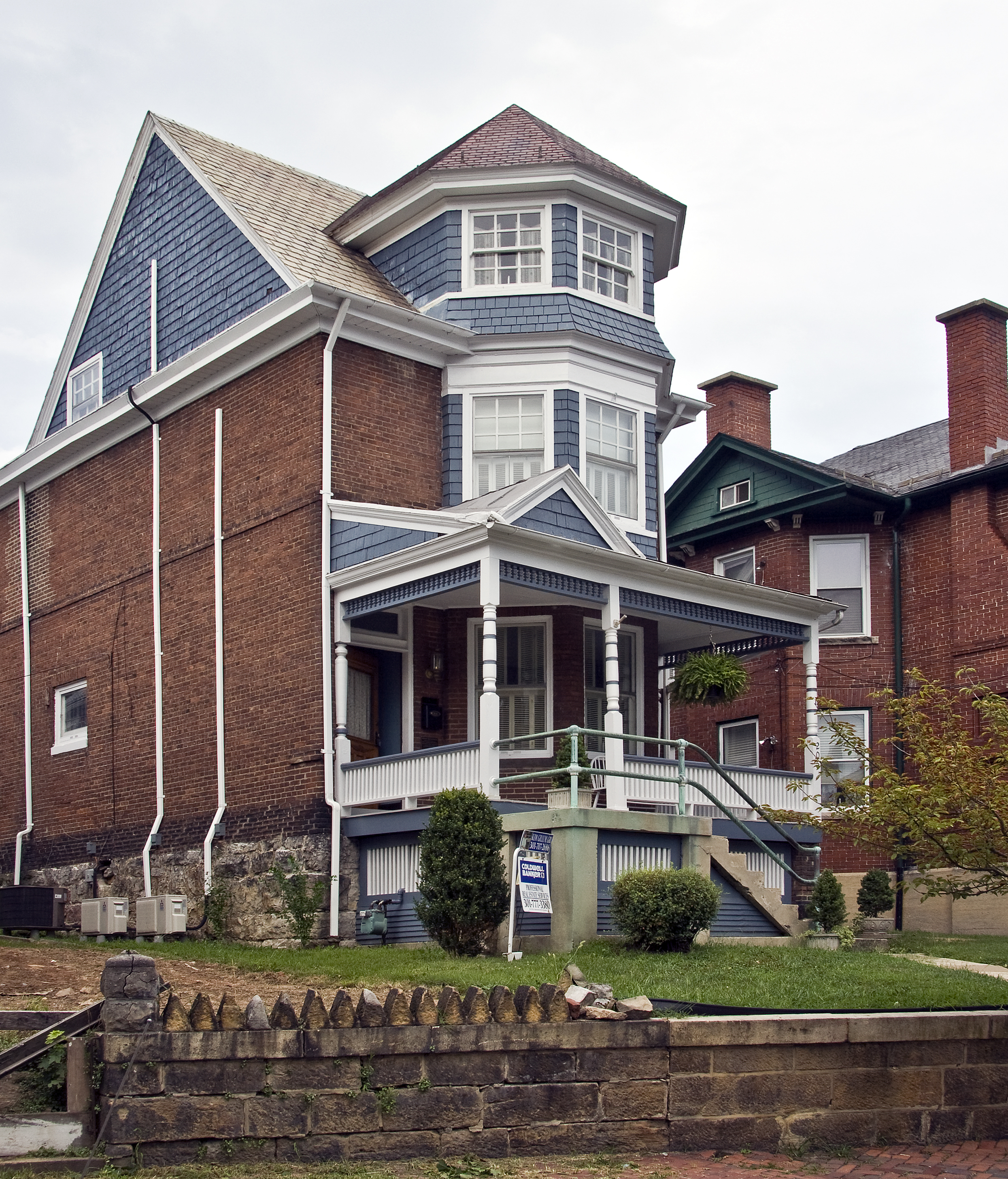

- Location within Maryland Location within the United States
- Interactive map showing the location for Wright-Butler House
- Location: 205 Columbia St., Cumberland, Maryland
- Coordinates: 39°39′25″N 78°45′48″W
- Area: less than one acre
- Built: 1896
- Architect: Butler, Wright
- Architectural style: Queen Anne
- NRHP reference No.: 78001440
- Added to NRHP: January 31, 1978

Wright Butler House is a historic home in Cumberland, Allegany County, Maryland, United States. It is a 2 1/2-story, Queen Anne-style suburban one-unit dwelling built about 1896. The house was the home of Wright Butler (1868–1932), one of Cumberland's leading architects at the turn of the 20th century. He also designed the George Truog House.

The Wright Butler House was listed on the National Register of Historic Places in 1978.
