= Constitution Park =

Constitution Park may refer to a park or location in the United States:

- Constitution Park (Delaware), a park in Dover, Delaware
- Constitution Park (Maryland), a public park in Cumberland
- Constitution Park (New Hampshire), a hotel proposed in 2005 in New Hampshire in response to legal rulings around the concept of eminent domain
