= Allegany County Courthouse =

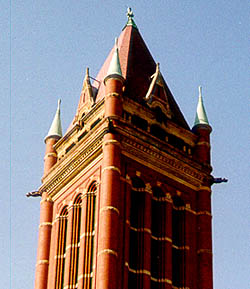
- Interactive map of the Allegany County Courthouse area

General information
- Architectural style: Richardsonian Romanesque
- Location: Cumberland, Maryland, United States
- Coordinates: 39°39′03″N 78°46′01″W
- Construction started: 1893
- Cost: $97,000

Design and construction
- Architect: Wright Butler

Website
- www.mdcourts.gov/clerks/allegany/histcthouse

The Allegany County Courthouse is the Maryland Circuit court for Allegany County, Maryland, United States. It is located in Cumberland's Washington Street Historic District. With its Richardsonian Romanesque styling, the courthouse is a prominent part of the city's skyline.

== History ==
In 1789, the Allegany County Court was created by Act of the Maryland General Assembly. As part of the Act, Washington County had been subdivided and Allegany County, a name derived from the Indian word "Oolikhanna," meaning beautiful stream, was formed. Local historians have reported that the first court cases in Allegany County were held in the home of John Graham and court business was held in a Green Street tavern owned by Abraham Faw. This was a temporary measure until a proper courthouse could be built.

=== First Court House ===
In 1793, the General Assembly authorized the construction of the county's first courthouse and jail, but it was not until 1799 that the courthouse was ready for use. This first courthouse was built for a sum of $3,062.50.

In 1806, improvements were made by building records rooms for the Clerk of Court and the Registrar of Wills for a total sum of $1200.00.

=== Second Court House ===
In 1834, the courthouse had become too small for the county's increasing needs and a new courthouse was approved to be built for a sum of $5000.00. This new courthouse was completed in 1841.

Thirty years later, in the 1860s, $75,000 in bonds were issued by the County Commissioners for the purpose of enlarging and remodeling the existing courthouse and for building a new jail. The courthouse was improved and used for the next 30 years, until it caught fire and was destroyed on January 5, 1893. Only the vaults of the Clerk of Court and Registrar of Wills were salvaged from the fire. The court has moved to the City Hall and Academy of Music building temporarily.

=== Third Court House ===
Designed in 1893, the Courthouse was the first major commission of local architect Wright Butler. Butler based his design for this public building on the Richardsonian Romanesque architectural style. The massing and detail of the courthouse are typical of this late 19th-century style, developed from the works of architect Henry Hobson Richardson. Characteristic of this style, the courthouse combines the use of brick highlighted with stone belt courses and presents a uniform rock-faced exterior finish. The building's ribbons of windows set deeply into the walls, and large arched entry are also typical Richardsonian features. Less typical is the courthouse's tower buttressed with round columns that rises above the three-story building. Construction of the building was completed for a total cost of $97,000. One of the pinnacle examples of Richardson's work is the Allegheny County Courthouse in Pittsburgh, Pennsylvania, which Cumberland's Courthouse strongly resembles.
