= Lost Liberty Hotel =

Hotel proposed as a political protest

The Lost Liberty Hotel or Lost Liberty Inn was a proposed hotel to be built on the site of United States Supreme Court Associate Justice David Souter's properties in Weare, New Hampshire. The proposal was a reaction to the Supreme Court’s Kelo v. New London (2005) decision in which Souter joined the majority ruling that the U.S. Constitution allows the use of eminent domain to condemn privately owned real property for use in private economic development projects.

On March 14, 2006, a ballot initiative favoring this project was defeated by almost a three-to-one margin. Two candidates who had supported the initiative were not elected to the town's Board of Selectmen.

== History ==
Souter voted with the five-Justice majority in Kelo v. New London, a 2005 decision in which the Court held that the Constitution does not prohibit a local government from condemning private property in order to transfer the land to a commercial developer that promises to bring in more tax revenue than the original owner, so long as such use serves a subjectively defined "public purpose," such as economic development of a "distressed" area. Justice John Paul Stevens wrote the majority opinion, joined by Justices Anthony Kennedy, David Souter, Ruth Bader Ginsburg and Stephen Breyer. Justice Sandra Day O'Connor wrote the principal dissent, joined by Chief Justice William Rehnquist, and Justices Antonin Scalia and Clarence Thomas. Justice Thomas also wrote a separate dissent.

On June 27, 2005, Logan Clements proposed that the Town of Weare use eminent domain to the land and farmhouse where Souter spent most of his youth, and where Souter still resided, for the purpose of constructing a hotel and restaurant on the property. Clements asserted that the Town of Weare would gain more tax revenue and economic benefits from the hotel and restaurant than it did from Souter's private residence. Clements said he would fund the hotel partly with investment capital from objectivists, libertarians, and other investors and hoped that members of prominent objectivist and libertarian groups would be regular customers.

On June 29, 2005, Travis J. I. Corcoran created an online pledge form in which potential patrons would pledge to spend at least one week at the hotel if it was constructed. Within eight days, more than 1,000 registered users had signed the pledge, and by the pledge deadline of August 29, 2005, a total of 1,418 people had signed. Clements and his staff maintained that they were serious about building the hotel if it gained enough public interest and financial support.

A local group, the Committee for the Protection of Natural Rights, proposed a measure which, if adopted by popular vote, would provide for Souter's house and land to be taken for the construction of an Inn. The measure would create two trusts to fund the hotel project, one to cover legal expenses and another to hold donations to provide "just compensation" for Souter's property. Clements announced an effort to add the proposal to the agenda of the Weare town meeting, and in late August, NPR and ABC reported he had managed to gain the 25 signatures required to place it on the ballot. Clements pursued financing and public relations efforts in support of the project. Supporters of the initiative held a rally in Weare on January 21 and 22, 2006, attended by supporters from as far away as Washington State and Texas, and supported of hotel backer Joshua Solomon's candidacy for election to the Weare Board of Selectmen in March 2006. Supporters also canvassed voters door-to-door in Weare and spread word of the ballot initiative. The effort received local, state, and national media attention.

On February 4, 2006, voters who gathered for the meeting portion of the town's annual election process voted to change the article's wording. The new text simply called upon the state legislature to oppose the taking of private property for use by private development, as some argued the Kelo decision now allowed. The voice vote was unanimous, although some supporters of the hotel concept later said they were upset by the vote. Under New Hampshire's town election system, any town resident who attends this annual meeting may amend warrant articles, including ones submitted by petition. Clements later condemned this procedure as undemocratic.

Weare voters passed this newly worded article as it appeared on the town ballot when they went to the polls on March 14, 2006. Two candidates for selectman who supported the hotel and were founding members of the Committee for the Protection of Natural Rights were defeated for election.

== Notable commentary ==
Professor Randy Barnett, a lawyer and senior fellow at the Cato Institute who opposed Kelo, found the proposal amusing at first, facetiously calling the hotel an "excellent public purpose", but rejected the idea when he found out people were taking it seriously, stating: "Retaliating against a judge ... violates the holding of Kelo itself, for the intent would be to take from A to give to B, in this case to punish A."

Professor Eugene Volokh categorized Clements' actions as political speech protected by the First Amendment to the United States Constitution. However, he criticized the hotel proposal itself, on the grounds that "we shouldn't seriously want government agencies to retaliate against government officials by seizing their property."

New Hampshire's Republican state representative from Weare, Neal Kurk, saw the hotel plans as "poetic justice", as he opposed Kelo, but he hopes that "Justice Souter's property will be protected by the good sense of New Hampshire townspeople." Sterling Burnett, senior fellow at the National Center for Policy Analysis, stated that he thought approval of the proposal would be "sweet justice", saying: "It shows how the sanctity of peoples' homes now exists solely at the whim of local politicians." Editors of the Missoulian said they "like[d]" the proposal and that it would "be amusing to turn the tables on those who undermine the rights of citizens", but point out: "Based on our reading of the Supreme Court's majority opinion in the property-rights case, it takes more than a simple good idea to take someone's home away."

Air America Radio commentator Rachel Maddow, appearing on Tucker Carlson's MSNBC "Situation" program, dismissed the proposal as a "creepy" publicity stunt. One Weare area newspaper praised the Board of Selectmen for its handling of the Clements proposal, noting that it was "impossible for them to act on it because it had not gone through proper channels."

== See also ==
- Constitution Park (New Hampshire)
