= Mexico Farms Airport =

- IATA: none; ICAO: none; FAA LID: 1W3

Summary
- Airport type: Public
- Location: Cumberland, MD
- Elevation AMSL: 607 ft / 185 m
- Coordinates: 39°36′17″N 078°45′38″W

Map
- Location of airport in Maryland

Runways
Direction	Length		Surface
Direction	ft	m	Surface
9/27	2,120	646	Sod
16/34	2,100	640	Turf

Mexico Farms Airport (FAA LID: 1W3) is a public airport located south of downtown Cumberland, Maryland. The airport is located immediately south of the larger Greater Cumberland Regional Airport. It is the oldest unpaved public landing field in Maryland. The airport was officially opened in 1923, though it was used unofficially for several years prior. The airport has been used by Charles Lindbergh and Howard Hughes.
