= George Washington Carver High School (Cumberland, Maryland) =

Segregated public school in Cumberland, MD for black children

Location
- Cumberland, Maryland; U.S.
- Coordinates: 39°39′10″N 78°43′45″W

Information
- Former name: Lincoln High School
- Type: Public
- Established: 1923
- Status: Now Carver Community Center Museum
- Closed: 1959

George Washington Carver High School was the high school for black children in Cumberland, Maryland prior to the integration of public schools in 1955.

== History ==
In 1864 the state legislature provided both funds, and a means for local government to allocate taxes and private donations in order to fund schools for negroes. A public school for African-Americans in Cumberland named Mary Hoye School was run within a colored YMCA on Independence Street. In 1923 a new school was built on Frederick Street to serve the growing population. In 1941 Principal Bracey held an election amongst students and faculty to choose a new name for the school. The choice was made to name the school after inventor and educator George Washington Carver. Since the quality of educational facilities for black children in surrounding areas was inadequate, many African-Americans from surrounding areas in Maryland and West Virginia sent their children to Carver. In 1955 the public schools were integrated. 54 negro children attended the white schools, and in the spring of 1956, Judy Leath, Harold Hilton and William Peck became the first black students to graduate from integrated schools in Allegany County.

The school closed in 1959. In 1961, the newly established Allegany Community College renovated the site and used it for 8 years. The Carver Community Center Museum is now located on the site.
