= Embassy Theatre (Cumberland) =

- Downtown Cumberland Historic District
- U.S. National Register of Historic Places
- U.S. Historic district – Contributing property
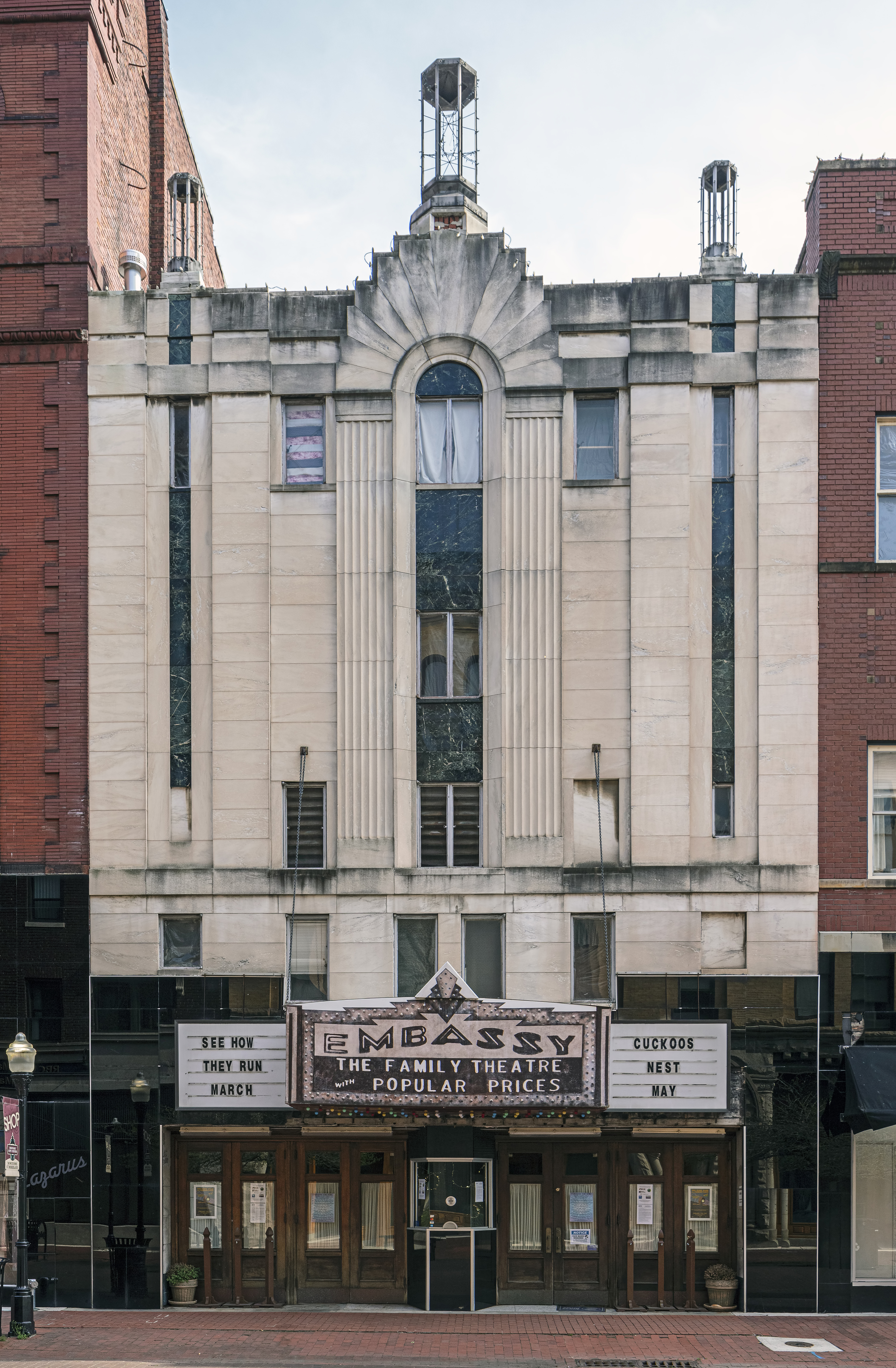
- The Embassy Theatre in 2021

- Location within Maryland Location within the United States
- Location: 49 Baltimore St., Cumberland, Maryland
- Coordinates: 39°39′04.3″N 78°45′44.2″W
- Architect: Hodgens and Hills
- Architectural style: Art Deco
- NRHP reference No.: 83002917
- Added to NRHP: August 4, 1983

The Embassy Theatre is a performance theater located in the downtown mall of Cumberland, Maryland at 49 Baltimore St.

The theater mounts live performances of classic theatre fare such as Kurt Weill's The Threepenny Opera and Kander and Ebb's Cabaret; lesser-known works such as The Mystery of Irma Vep and The Lady In Question; and original works and local historical plays. Other entertainment presented at the theatre includes movies and musical concerts.

Originally opened as a movie theater in 1931, it became a curtain and drapery store, and was then remodeled to a live performance theater and allied arts venue. Until December 2014, the theatre was operated as the New Embassy Theatre. Recently remodeled, it now operates as the Embassy Theatre.

The Embassy was designed by architects Hodgens and Hills in the Art Deco style. The building features prominent fluted pilasters, topped with finials illuminated with neon. The theater is a major contributing feature of the Downtown Cumberland Historic District.
