= George Truog House =

Historic house in Maryland, United States

- U.S. National Register of Historic Places
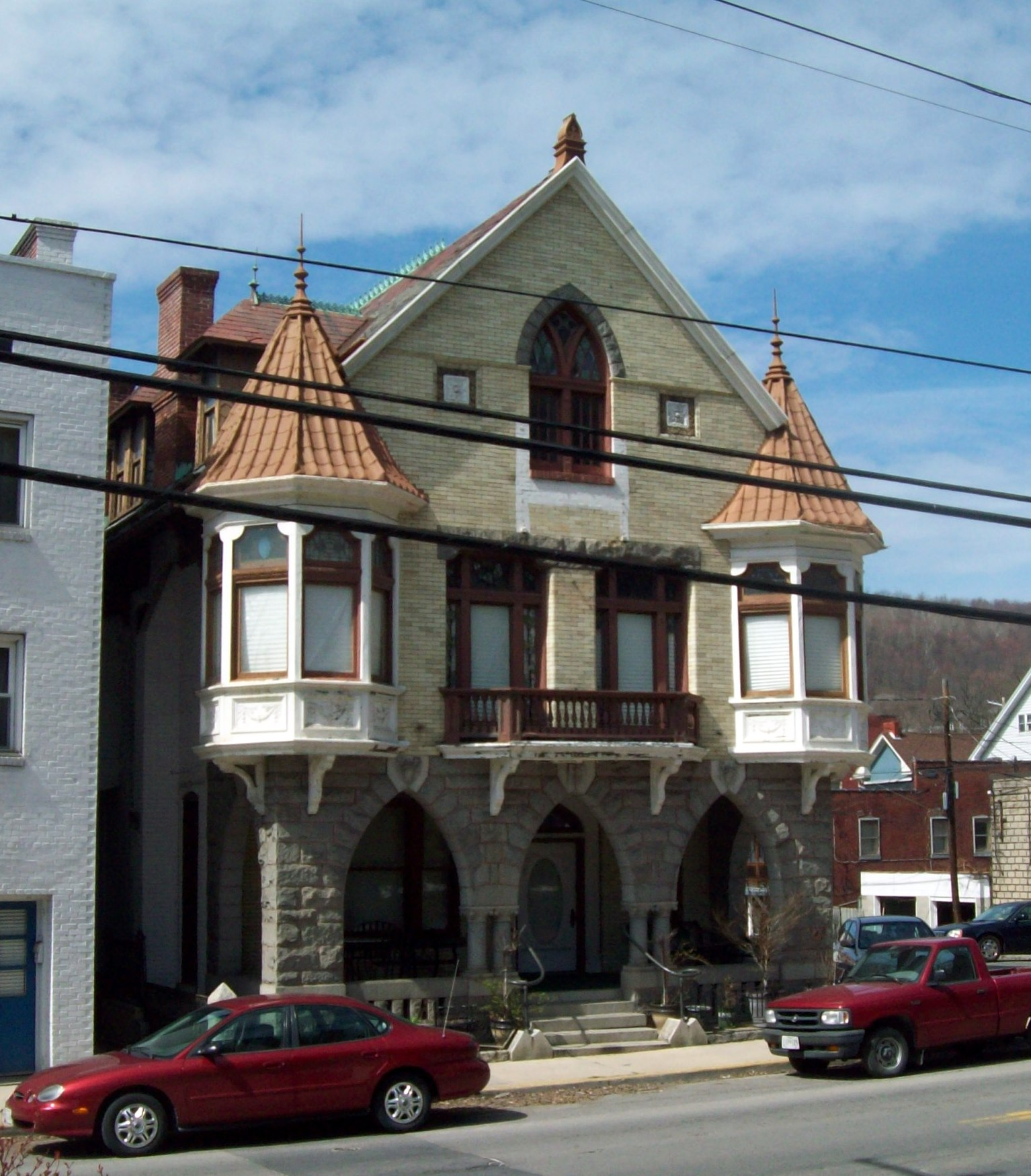
- George Truog House, March 2011

- Location within Maryland Location within the United States
- Location: 230 Baltimore Ave., Cumberland, Maryland
- Coordinates: 39°39′13″N 78°45′29″W
- Area: less than one acre
- Built: 1903
- Architect: Butler, Wright
- NRHP reference No.: 86002382
- Added to NRHP: September 11, 1986

George Truog House is a historic 3-story brick house built in 1903 in Cumberland, Allegany County, Maryland, US. The house was built by George Truog and designed by local architect Wright Butler. Truog was a co–founder of the Seneca Glass Company in Fostoria, Ohio, in 1891, and proprietor of the Maryland Glass Etching Works in Cumberland from 1893 to 1911. The house contains a unique collection of decorative glass.

The house is believed to have cost $50,000 (equivalent to $1,791,667 in 2025) to build. Truog lost his home and business to the courts in 1909 after a downswing in his glass business. Truog died in 1932, and his former home was used as a funeral home for at least 60 years. The George Truog House was listed on the National Register of Historic Places in 1986.

== Notes ==
=== References ===
- Paquette, Jack K. (2002). Blowpipes, Northwest Ohio Glassmaking in the Gas Boom of the 1880s. Xlibris Corp. ISBN 1-4010-4790-4. OCLC 50932436.
- West Virginia (1893). Acts of the Legislature of West Virginia at its Twenty-First Regular and Extra Sessions, commencing January 11, and February 25, 1893. Charleston, West Virginia: Moses W. Donally, Public Printer. OCLC 24491764. Archived from the original on August 29, 2023.
