= East Side School Cumberland, Maryland =

American school in Cumberland, Maryland

Coordinates: 39°39′22″N 78°45′2″W

East Side School was established in Cumberland, Maryland in 1918, where a small wooden school with four classrooms sat (this building was the Lindnerville School). The brick building was built in 1921 and it contained two floors and seven classrooms. Two more additions were added which increased the number of classrooms. The building contained an assembly hall, music room, art room, main staircase, and teacher's lounge. The school closed in 1984 due to consolidation.

An effort to rehabilitate the former school and renovate it to establish residential housing units was unsuccessful. In the winter of 2013/2014, the city entered into negotiations to purchase the structure for demolition.

Principals

- Agnes Carroll (1918–1950)
- George E. Klinkhammer (1950–1953)
- Agnes Lauder (1953–1972)
- Marion Bevins (1972–1974)
- Rebecca Millar (1974–1977)
- Doris Giornesto (1977–1984)
