= Gene Mason Sports Complex =

Sports field park complex in Maryland, US

Coordinates: 39°37′21.7″N 78°45′37.6″W

The Gene Mason Sports Complex is a 55-acre (220,000 m^{2}) sports field park complex located in Cumberland, Maryland. The park was dedicated in 1952 and geared towards organized team sports of baseball, soccer, football, valley ball, tennis, and basketball. A natural vegetation buffer exists along the Potomac River frontage, acting as a stormwater runoff filter and component of the Potomac River Greenway.

The north side of the park adjoins the C&O Canal Historic Park. The Canal Towpath is part of a trail network linking Pittsburgh, Pennsylvania, and Washington, D.C., via the Allegheny Highland Trail and Chesapeake & Ohio Canal National Historic Park.

The park includes 4 ball fields, 4 soccer fields, 1 multi-use field, 3 sand volleyball courts, 4 tennis courts, horseshoe courts, and a BMX race track.

This complex is located in a flood plain. In general, The recreational facilities are a good use of flood plain land, as there is little potential for loss of life or major property damage. The complex is also located adjacent to and upwind from the wastewater treatment plant, which creates odor problems on occasion.
