= WebstaurantStore =

American online restaurant supply company

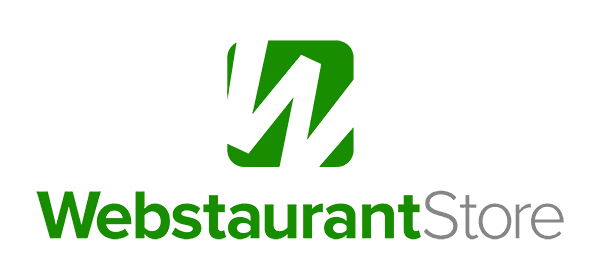

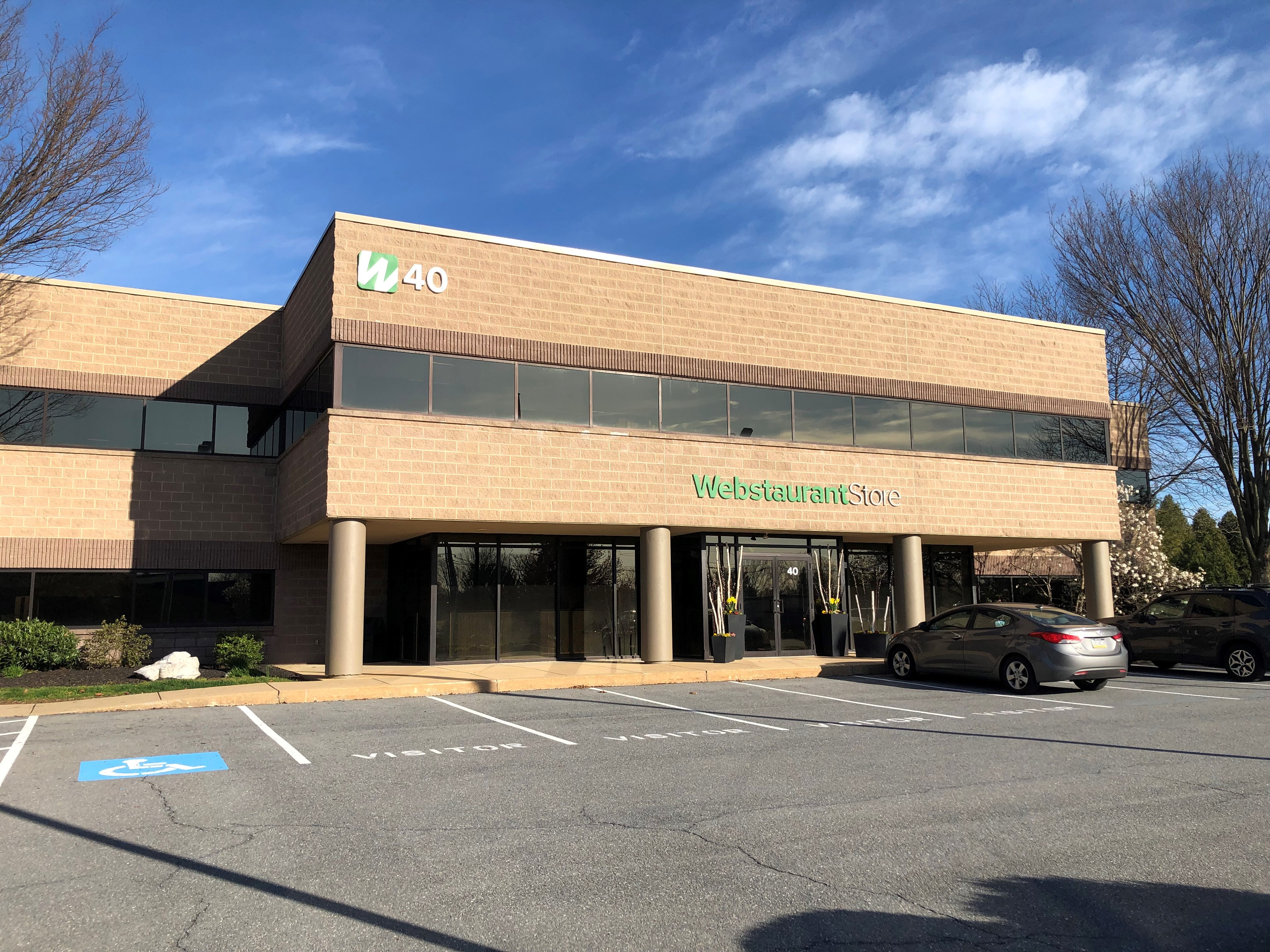
- Company type: Privately held company
- Industry: Foodservice
- Founded: 2004
- Founder: Fred Clark
- Headquarters: Lititz, Pennsylvania, United States
- Number of locations: 18 warehouses
- Area served: U.S.
- Key people: Dave Groff (President); Charlie Garber (CIO)
- Brands: Acopa®, Avantco™, Backyard Pro®, Choice®, Carnival King®, Cooking Performance Group®, Lancaster Table & Seating®, Lavex®, Noble Chemical™, Regal Foods™
- Number of employees: 3,000 (2023)
- Parent: Clark Associates

WebstaurantStore is an online restaurant supply company based in Lititz, Pennsylvania. The company offers commercial-grade equipment to the foodservice industry through online ordering and commercial shipping, and carries over 430,000 products. They have over 70 private-label brands, including Avantco, Choice, Noble, and Regal.

== History ==
WebstaurantStore was founded in Lancaster, Pennsylvania as a business-to-business sales company. The company is currently led by President Dave Groff who helped establish the business in 2004. In 2012, WebstaurantStore expanded to Madisonville, Kentucky followed by other expansions to Dayton, Nevada in 2013 and Cumberland, Maryland in 2014. To date, WebstaurantStore also operates warehouses in Pennsylvania; Durant, Oklahoma; and Albany, Georgia. In 2013, the company moved headquarters from Smoketown to Lititz. Office locations have since expanded from Pennsylvania into Albany, Georgia; Madisonville, Kentucky; and Tampa Bay, Florida.
