= Cumberland Theatre =

Regional professional theatre in Cumberland, Maryland, US

Coordinates: 39.6522°N 78.7666°W

Cumberland Theatre Company
- Type: non-profit
- Industry: Entertainment
- Founded: 1988
- Headquarters: Cumberland, Maryland
- Area served: Western Maryland
- Services: Theatre
- Website: www.cumberlandtheatre.com

The Cumberland Theatre is Western Maryland's only regional professional theatre. It is located in Cumberland, Maryland, and stages a wide variety of musicals, plays, and dramas. It is a nonprofit organization, founded in 1988 and relocated in a formerly empty church in 1991.

== History ==
Started as a project of Frostburg State University as a way to rejuvenate the summer theatre program, the theatre has since become independent of the university. Three of the founders were President Reinhard, Dr. Press and Dean Phillip Allen. It was incorporated in 1987, after Frostburg President Herb Rinehard expressed concern about the absence of summer theatre in Cumberland, which led to the cooperation of current theatre professor David Press and Dean Phillip Allen in founding the Cumberland theatre with a view to stimulating the local economy. A board of Trustees was later established, chaired by Shirley Giarritta. This board included members from the university, County and City administration, local businesses, and local residents.

The new Summer Theatre started in 1988 and 1989 as a rotating repertory theatre. Dr. Press acted as the artistic director as well as the Producing Director. In the next season, Dean Allen assumed the role of executive director and the Producer, while Dr. Press remained the artistic director. By the third season, the first full-time Producing Director and general manager, Mr. Pat Julian, was selected.

The theatre group performed in a borrowed storefront in the Schwarzenbach building on the Downtown Mall until 1991, when with assistance from the state of Maryland, Mrs. Giarriatta and Mr. Nicholas Giarriatta bought and renovated a disused Assembly of God church on Johnson street. Mr. Don Whisted was engaged in 1992 as artistic director and remained in that position assisted for many years by Mr. Gary Goodson, Associate Producer, until his retirement in October, 2016. In 2003 William H. Macy, an Emmy Award winning actor, agreed to serve on the board of trustees. That same year the auditorium was named “The Nicholas and Shirley Giarritta Playhouse” to honour their many contributions to the theatre. The newly selected theatre management team consists of Co-Artistic Directors Kimberli Rowley & Rhett Wolford.

== Accommodation ==
The theatre's present location is at 101 North Johnson Street, formerly an Assembly of God Church. The building houses the costume and scene shops and storage, as well as the theatre house. The theatre seats 198 patrons. The Bev Walker Gallery serves as the lobby of the theatre with an art show on display with each production.

== Management ==
The Cumberland Theatre is owned and operated by a volunteer board of trustees and is a 501 (c)(3) non-profit organization. The theatre is also supported by volunteers who serve on various committees and work as front of house staff.

The theatre is supported by donations from residents of the city of Cumberland, along with patrons such as Allegany County, Maryland Arts Council, Allegany County, the City of Cumberland, and the Allegany Arts Council.

== Productions ==
The Cumberland Theatre produces a variety of plays. The artistic director posts a brief synopsis of the play and usually a subjective rating, based on the language and themes contained in the shows. The wide variety of genres include, comedy, drama, horror/thriller, musical, colonial, autobiographical, romance, crime, and mystery. Over the years, musicals have proven to be generally the most popular, followed by comedies and thrillers. Furthermore, the theatre has produced many shows featuring stories specific to different minorities. Some examples are: The Diary of Anne Frank, Ain't Misbehavin', Hairspray, The All Night Strut, and To Kill A Mockingbird.

=== Past productions ===
Past productions
Date	Show	Credits
July 2013	The Producers	by Mel Brooks and Thomas Meehan
July 2012	The Pirates of Penzance	Book by W. S. Gilbert, Music by Arthur Sullivan
April 2012	Romeo and Juliet	by William Shakespeare
February 2012	Boeing Boeing	
December 2011	Every Christmas Story Ever Told	by Michael Carleton, Jim FitzGerald & John K. Alvarez
October 2011	Little Shop of Horrors	by Alan Menken & Howard Ashman
July 2011	RENT	by Jonathan Larson
April 2011	The Importance of Being Earnest	by Oscar Wilde
February 2011	The Last of the Red Hot Lovers	by Neil Simon
Nov/Dec 2010	Robert Louis Stevenson's Treasure Island	by Ken Ludwig
October 2010	The Rocky Horror Show	by Richard O'Brien
July 2010	Hairspray	Book: Mark O'Donnell & Thomas Meehan, Music & Lyrics: Marc Shaiman, Lyrics: Scott Wittman
2009	Dirty Blonde	by Claudia Shear
	Fiddler on the Roof	Book by Joseph Stein, Lyrics by Sheldon Harnick, Music by Jerry Bock
	Laughter on the 23rd Floor	by Neil Simon
	The Complete Works of William Shakespeare (abridged)	by Adam Long, Daniel Singer & Jess Winfield
	Plaid Tidings	by Stuart Ross
2008	Jekyll & Hyde	Conceived for the stage by Steve Cuden & Frank Wildhorn; Book & Lyrics by Leslie Bricusse, Music by Frank Wildhorn
	Copenhagen	by Michael Frayn
	The Glass Menagerie	by Tennessee Williams
	A Christmas Carol	by Charles Dickens, adapted for the stage by Tony Reich
2007	The Full Monty	Music & Lyrics by David Yazbek, Book by Terrence McNally
	The Man Who Came To Dinner	by Moss Hart & George S. Kaufman
	Shirley Valentine	by Willy Russell
	Ten Little Indians (And Then There Were None)	by Agatha Christie
	Cinderella	Music by Richard Rodgers, Book & Lyrics by Oscar Hammerstein II
2006	Camping With Henry & Tom	by Mark St. Germain
	Joseph And The Amazing Technicolor Dreamcoat	Music by Andrew Lloyd Webber, Lyrics by Tim Rice
	Hay Fever	by Noël Coward
	Deathtrap	by Ira Levin
	Twelfth Night	by William Shakespeare
2005	Tru	by Jay Presson Allen
	The Sound of Music	Music by Richard Rodgers, Lyrics by Oscar Hammerstein II Book by Howard Lindsay & Russell Crouse
	Pippin	Book by Roger O. Hirson, Music & Lyrics by Stephen Schwartz
	The Diary of Anne Frank	by Albert Hackett & Frances Goodrich
	A Christmas Carol	by Charles Dickens, adapted by Tony Reich
2004	My Way	by David Grapes & Todd Olson
	Play It Again Sam	by Woody Allen
	Shenandoah	Book by James Lee Barrett, Peter Udell & Philip Rose; Music by Gary Geld, Lyrics by Peter Udell
	Frankenstein	based on the novel by Mary Shelley
	A Christmas Carol	by Charles Dickens, adapted by Tony Reich
2003	Sweeney Todd	Music & Lyrics by Stephen Sondheim, Book by Hugh Wheeler
	The Odd Couple	by Neil Simon
	Big River	Music & Lyrics by Roger Miller, Book by William Hauptman
	Harper Lee's To Kill A Mockingbird	by Christopher Sergel
	A Christmas Carol	by Charles Dickens, adapted by Tony Reich
2002	Guys & Dolls	Music & Lyrics by Frank Loesser, Book by Jo Swerling & Abe Burrows
	Jerry's Girls	Concept by Larry Alford, Wayne Cilento & Jerry Herman
	Bye, Bye Birdie	Book by Michael Stewart, Lyrics by Lee Adams, Music by Charles Strouse
	Macbeth	by William Shakespeare
	Angel Street	by Patrick Hamilton
2001	Forever Plaid	by Stuart Ross
	Pump Boys and Dinettes	by John Schimmel, Cass Morgan, Jim Wann, Debra Monk, John Foley, Mark Hardwick
	Annie	Book by Thomas Meehan; Music by Charles Strouse, Lyrics by Martin Charnin
	Brigadoon	Book & Lyrics by Alan Jay Lerner, Music by Frederick Lowe
	Arsenic and Old Lace	by Joseph Kesselring
2000	West Side Story	Concept by Jerome Robbins, Book by Arthur Laurents, Music by Leonard Bernstein, Lyrics by Stephen Sondheim
	Blithe Spirit	by Noël Coward
	Oliver	Music, Lyrics & Book by Lionel Bart
	Dracula	by Hamilton Dean & John L. Balderston
1999	Dames at Sea	Book & Lyrics by George Haimsohn & Robin Miller; Music by Jim Wise
	Noises Off	by Michael Frayn
	The King And I	Music by Richard Rodgers, Book & Lyrics by Oscar Hammerstein II
	The Taming Of The Shrew	by William Shakespeare
	The All Night Strut	by Fran Charnas
	Dial 'M' For Murder	by Frederick Knott
1998	Nunsense Jamboree	by Dan Goggin
	Who's Afraid of Virginia Woolf?	by Edward Albee
	Blood Brothers	Book, Music & Lyrics by Willy Russell
	Barefoot in the Park	by Neil Simon
	A Closer Walk With Patsy Cline	by Dean Regan
	The Woman In Black	by Stephen Mallatrat
1997	Godspell	Concept by John Michael Trebelak; Music & Lyrics by Stephen Schwartz
	The Lion In Winter	by James Goldman
	The Pirates Of Penzance	Book by W. S. Gilbert, Music by Arthur Sullivan
	Moon Over Buffalo	by Ken Ludwig
	Ain't Misbehavin' - The "Fats" Waller Musical	Concept by Murray Horowitz & Richard Maltby Jr.
	Sleuth	by Anthony Shaffer
1996	The Fantasticks	Book & Lyrics by Tom Jones, Music by Harvey Schmidt
	Cat On A Hot Tin Roof	by Tennessee Williams
	Cabaret	Book by Joe Masteroff, Music by John Kander, Lyrics by Fred Ebb
	Don't Dress for Dinner	by Marc Canolletti, Robin Hawdon
	A Closer Walk With Patsy Cline	by Dean Regan
	Sherlock Holmes	by William Gillette & Arthur Conan Doyle
1995	Forever Plaid	by Stuart Ross
	Private Lives	by Noël Coward
	The Music Man	Book, Music & Lyrics by Meredith Willson, Story by Franklin Lacey
	Jacques Brel is Alive and Well and Living in Paris	Conception & English Lyrics by Eric Blau & Mort Shuman; Music by Jacques Brel
	Rumors	by Neil Simon
	The Mousetrap	by Agatha Christie
1994	Nunsense II	by Dan Goggin
	Greater Tuna	by Jaston Williams, Joe Sears & Ed Howard
	Man of La Mancha	Book by Dale Wasserman, Music by Mitch Leigh, Lyrics by Joe Darion
	Love, Sex and The I.R.S.	by William Van Zandt & Jane Milmore
	Something's Afoot	Book, Music & Lyrics by James McDonald, David Vos & Robert Gerlach
1993	Lettice & Lovage	by Peter Shaffer
	Evita	Music by Andrew Lloyd Webber, Lyrics by Tim Rice
	Run For Your Wife	by Ray Cooney
	Murderer	by Anthony Shaffer
1992	A Funny Thing Happened On The Way To The Forum	Book by Burt Shevlove & Larry Gelbart; Music & Lyrics by Stephen Sondheim
	Social Security	by Andrew Bergman
	I Do! I Do!	Book & Lyrics by Tom Jones, Music by Harvey Schmidt
	Dracula	by Hamilton Dean & John L. Balderston
1991	Nunsense	by Dan Goggin
	Other People's Money	by Jerry Sterner
	Lend Me A Tenor	by Ken Ludwig
1990	The Best Little Whorehouse in Texas	Book by Larry L. King & Peter Masterson; Music & Lyrics by Carol Hall
	Steel Magnolias	by Robert Harling
	Side By Side by Sondheim	Music & Lyrics by Stephen Sondheim; Additional Music by Leonard Bernstein, Mary Rodgers, Richard Rodgers & Julie Styne. Continuity by Ned Sherrin
1989	Broadway Bound	by Neil Simon
	Promises, Promises	Music by Burt Bacharach, Book by Neil Simon, Lyrics by Hal David
	Romantic Comedy	by Bernard Slade
1988	Brighton Beach Memoirs	by Neil Simon
	The Pajama Game	Music by Richard Adler & Jerry Ross; Book by George Abbott, Richard Bissell; Lyrics by Richard Adler, Jerry Ross
	The Nerd	by Larry Shue
