= Wright Butler =

American architect

Wright Butler was a prominent American architect in Cumberland, Maryland.

Born as the son of a furniture manufacturer, Butler studied architecture at the Maryland Institute of Baltimore for three years beginning in 1888. At the Institute, Butler familiarized himself with fashionable architectural styles of the time like Richardsonian Romanesque and Queen Anne Architecture.

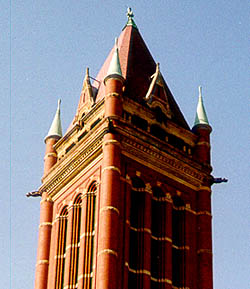
Allegany County Courthouse in Cumberland, Maryland

Upon his return to Cumberland in 1891, the young architect opened an office, working mainly on residential designs. In 1893, Butler received his first large commission, the Allegany County Courthouse.

Other Butler designs include:

- the Cumberland Masonic Temple
- the Cumberland Liberty Bank Building
- the George Truog House.

His designs still dominate the Cumberland skyline today. (Paul et al. 2003)

== Wright Butler House ==
Constructed around 1896, the Wright Butler House is a unique example of Queen Anne architecture. Developed in England, the Queen Anne style first appeared in Rhode Island in 1874. American architectural magazines and pattern books quickly popularized the style. In England, architects used a combination of masonry and timber work, but most American Queen Anne homes are all-wood construction.

Wright Butler's Queen Anne design therefore stands as an unusual masonry example of the style. Using the classic "asymmetrical" feel of most Queen Anne designs, the street view is dominated by a three bay window arrangement that juts out from the rest of the building. The three bay window, repeated on the second and third stories, creates the appearance of a "tower," an oft repeated stylistic element in many Queen Anne buildings. The front porch is decorated with elaborate wooden spindle work.

The Wright Butler House is currently a private residence and not open to the public.
