= Florence Riefle Bahr =

American painter

- Born: Florence Riefle; February 2, 1909; Baltimore, Maryland, US
- Died: January 12, 1998 (aged 88); Elkridge, Maryland, US
- Education: Maryland Institute College of Art (MICA)
- Known for: Painting, sketching, mixed media
- Spouse: Leonard Bahr
- Awards: State of Maryland's Women's Hall of Fame (1999)

Florence Elizabeth Riefle Bahr (February 2, 1909 – January 12, 1998) was an American artist and activist. She made portraits of children and adults, including studies of nature as she found it. Instead of using a camera, more than 300 pen and ink sketchbooks catalog insights into her life, including her civil and human rights activism of the 1960s and 1970s. One of the many important captured events included the Washington D.C. event where Martin Luther King Jr. first gave his I Have a Dream speech. Her painting Homage to Martin Luther King hangs in the (NAACP) National Association for the Advancement of Colored People's headquarters. She created illustrations for children's books and painted a mural in the Works Progress Administration (WPA) for the Johns Hopkins Hospital's Harriet Lane Home for Children. Her works have been exhibited in solo and group exhibitions since the 1930s. In 1999, she was posthumously awarded to the State of Maryland's Women's Hall of Fame, as the first woman artist they recognized.

== Personal life ==
Florence Riefle was born in Baltimore, Maryland, to James Henry Riefle and Florence Riefle. She was the only artist in a musically talented family. Bahr grew up later in Homeland, but first in Forest Park, Maryland and graduated from Forest Park High School.

She met Leonard Marion Bahr, a portrait painter, who was her teacher at the Maryland Institute in 1930. She sometimes modeled for his portrait studies. In 1934, the couple married and subsequently, over the course of a decade, had three children: Beth, Leonard Jr., and Mary (Note: In 1982, Leonard Jr. is a marine biologist who, at that time, performed research and taught at Louisiana State University, and is now a retired coastal advisor to the Louisiana State Government. Mary is an artist who received her BFA and MFA degrees in painting from MICA and worked as an assistant curator and photographer at the Johns Hopkins University's art history department for 17 years, but is currently a local historian and an archivist and curator at the Elkridge Heritage Society. Beth is a gourmet cook and homemaker and still travels the world.)

The newly married Bahr couple first lived in Baltimore City in a studio apartment on a third floor. In an article about her, Florence said that she was mostly interested in her husband and painting; that they both "would rather paint than eat." She also mentioned a few shared recreational interests: horseback riding, hiking and swimming.

By 1940, Florence and Leonard were gaining recognition for their art, exhibitions and teaching abilities in Baltimore. During World War II, Leonard joined the Navy March 1, 1943, as a naval officer and was released on December 23, 1945. (Note: For Leonard Bahr (born May 12, 1905 and died July 25, 1990).) In 1947, the couple moved to an historic home on Old Lawyers Hill Road, an historic hilltop district in Elkridge, Howard County, Maryland and in the 1960s, Leonard had a newer house built on the same property, with each their own studios attached.

Florence Bahr died in a house fire, which resulting water damage destroyed a few, but not all, of her sketches. She suffered a tragic and needless local contractor-related death.

=== Civil rights ===
Concerned about civil and human rights, Florence became involved in these human rights causes—like children's welfare—as in the Black Panther breakfast programs for inner-city children, women's rights, and anti-war and anti-nuclear issues, as well as stopping African apartheid. She championed various activists like the Berrigan brothers, Albert Schweitzer, Tom Dooley, and anyone who stood up for the poor. She campaigned for public officials' attention on the issues that concerned her via telephone calls and letter-writing campaigns; participated in political marches, civil rights demonstrations, and attended trials. She was arrested at a big May Day anti-war demonstration at The Pentagon.

Bahr also sketched important events that she witnessed, like the trials of former Governor Marvin Mandel and the Catonsville Nine. She also had important images of key national and state marches and demonstrations. From many of these and other events, she donated more than 300 sketchbooks to the Maryland State Archives.

== Education ==
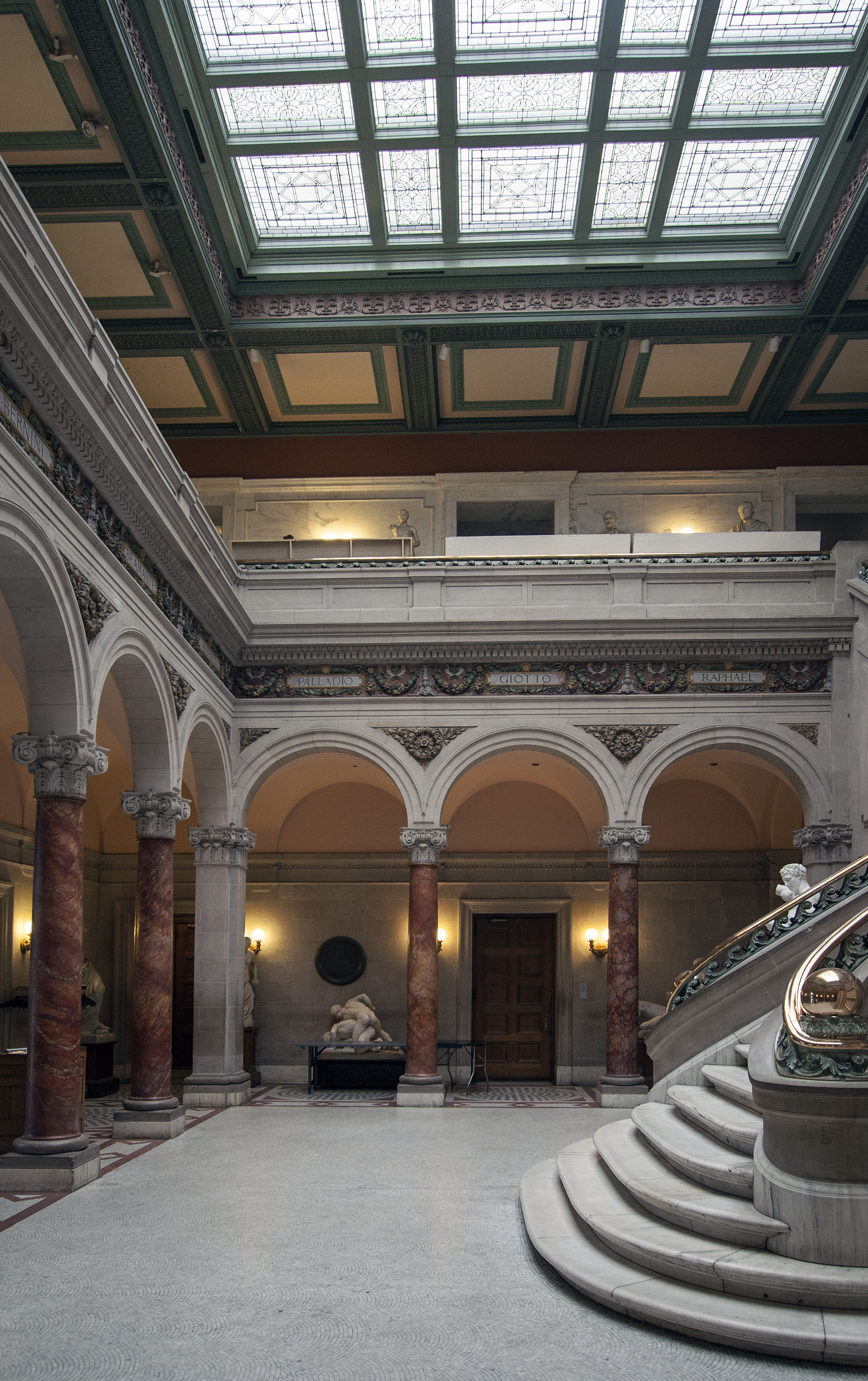
Maryland Institute College of Art (MICA), the main hall of the main building.

In 1927 she attended Dickinson College. The next year she enrolled in the Maryland Institute College of Art (MICA) and took an aggressive course schedule to earn a Costume Design diploma in 1930. The following year she earned the James Young Memorial Prize Award and a diploma in Fine Arts.

She enrolled in 1959 at the Catonsville Community College to study German and Biology. In 1962 received her Bachelor of Fine Arts degree in painting at MICA and in 1967 she received a Master of Fine Arts in Education and Printmaking.

== Career ==
=== Art ===
Bahr created sketches, oil and watercolor paintings, lithographs, sculptures, book illustrations, collages and constructions with found objects. Woodcuts, etchings, monoprints and linocuts were also methods she explored. She worked with pastels and inks. She exhibited extensively. Her creations were her daily life. Her painting of a sunflower was a free and spontaneous work, something reminiscent of Expressionism. She made many portraits of children, like her grandson, and numerous ones of her children as they grew up. Her portraits illustrated the essence of a person's character without "striving for prettiness". Working in multiple media, she often incorporated natural elements - like pebbles, a shell, a feather or other found objects.

From about 1931 to 1936, Bahr wrote and created pen and ink or watercolor illustrations for her or other author's children's books. As noted before, in the WPA program she painted a mural for the Harriet Lane Home for Children at the Johns Hopkins Hospital. Her works were shown in 1935 at the Baltimore Museum of Art, two years later she received her first award from the museum. In 1936, both Florence and Leonard's works were exhibited at the Maryland Institute in a joint exhibition, which some interested viewers were Hollywood actress Mae West and actor Dick Powell, who commented in the exhibit guest book, that he thought the exhibited work "very good." . Florence continued to exhibit her works there and receive additional awards. Her portrait of an African-American woman, Lily, was shown at the 1936 New York exhibition of the National Association of Women Painters and Sculptors. After having become a member, Bahr created oil paintings with greater frequency.

Of the many sketches that Bahr recorded from 1957 to 1992 of her experiences, she captured the Martin Luther King Jr.'s Washington, D.C. I Have a Dream speech, the Catonsville Nine courtroom trial, a march on The Pentagon, the trial of Governor Marvin Mandel, and Robert F. Kennedy's funeral.

She said she created Homage to Martin Luther King when, "I heard the news on the radio, and I felt like the world was coming to an end. I went up to my studio and poured my anguish and sorrow into the canvas. Homage came straight out of my heart.

— Florence Riefle Bahr

She created the Homage to Martin Luther King to help manage her feelings of his death and the resulting riots. It was displayed in the National Association for the Advancement of Colored People's (NAACP) Baltimore headquarters. Prior to her death, Bahr had presented it to that organization which she worked with in the 1960s and 1970s.

Bahr's art is in private and public collections in Europe, Japan and throughout the United States, including Baltimore Museum of Art, who has a color woodcut Indian Girl made in 1969. The Peabody Galleria Piccola held a retrospective exhibit of her works when she was 87 years old.

=== Antique doll collection ===
Bahr collected antique dolls and made more than 200 watercolor portraits of the dolls. She opened a museum in Ellicott City called the "Humpty Dumpty Museum of Dolls and Toys," as well as engaging as an antique dealer in the same city.

== Exhibitions ==
She participated in many solo and group exhibitions:

Solo exhibitions

- 1955 - Vagabond Theatre, Baltimore
- 1958 - Dickinson College, Carlisle, Pennsylvania
- 1964 - Parish Hall Art Gallery, Baltimore
- 1968 - Memorial Gallery, Baltimore
- 1974 - Fells Point Galler, Baltimore
- 1977 - Unicorn Gallery, Luthersvill, Maryland
- 1981 - Dickinson College, Carlisle, Pennsylvania
- 1989 - Rockland Art Center, Ellicott City, Maryland
- 1992 - Gal. Piccola, Peabody Conservatory Library

Group exhibitions

- Artists for Peace, Howard County, Maryland
- Baltimore Museum of Art
- Department of Education, Howard County, Maryland

Group exhibitions

- Jewish Community Center, Baltimore
- Jonade Gallery, Baltimore
- Loyola College, Baltimore
- Maryland Artists Today, 1968 state tour
- Maryland State Arts Council
- Maryland Institute Alumni Association, Mount Royal School
- McDonogh School, Tuttle Gallery
- National Association of Women Painters and Sculptors
- Peale Museum, Baltimore
- Pen Women, Washington and Baltimore
- Phoenix Gallery, Baltimore
- Vertical Gallery, Baltimore

== Awards ==
- 1936 - Baltimore Museum of Art Print Club Purchase Prize
- 1952 - Baltimore Museum of Art All Maryland Show
- 1968 - Maryland Institute Alumni F. Weber Award
- 1968 - Maryland Arts Council Selection, Second Annual Maryland Artists Today traveling show
- 1969 - Loyola College Baltimore Outdoor Show Purchase Prize
- 1971 - Second place prize in watercolors in the Constellation Art Contest
- 1999 - Posthumously inducted into the Maryland Women's Hall of Fame

== Recognition ==
In her book Women of Achievement in Maryland History, author Carolyn Stegman wrote:

Florence Bahr captured some striking images in her day, and her work remains important. She had a curious eye, a compassionate heart, a dogged determination, and an undying passion for portraying life in twentieth-century America. Frequently described as a 'Renaissance woman,' she was a diverse role model. Artist, feminist, environmentalist, consummate social activist – Florence Bahr gave her all to make the world a better place.
