= Frederick John Bahr =

German investor

Frederick John Bahr (1837–1885) was a German inventor who purchased Lover's Leap on Wills Mountain, in Cumberland, Maryland, in 1860. He is best remembered for his paddle-wheel-powered blimps he attempted to fly in the mountains. The first blimp burned while he was trying to fill it, the second one was destroyed by his enemies and the third attempt resulted in the wind carrying it off. He died in 1885, and in 1899, the Wills Mountain Inn replaced the log cabin where he used to live.

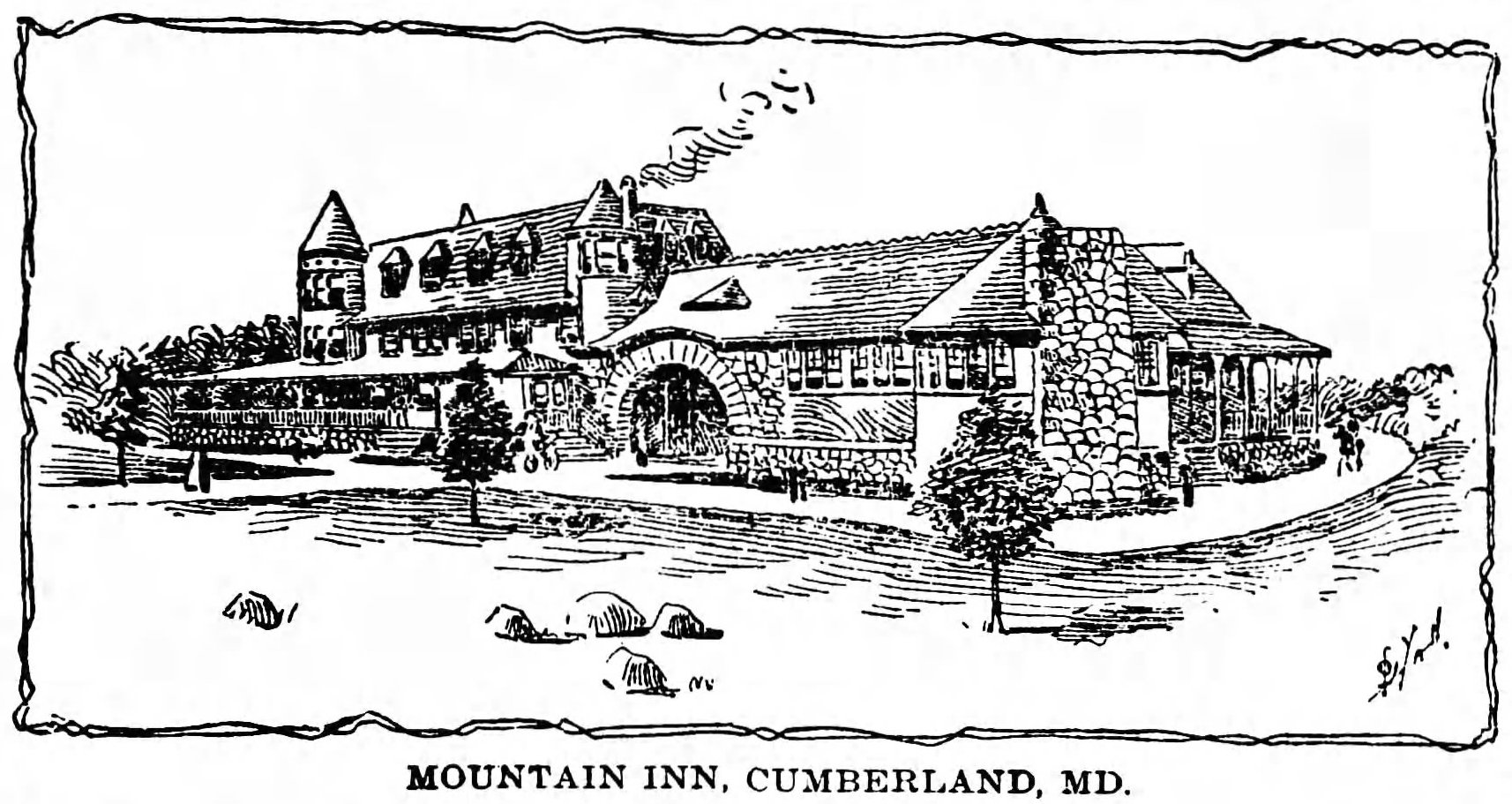
Wills Mountain Inn, circa 1899

From a newspaper article dated 1899:

Some 20 years ago, however, a German named Frederick Baehr, a man of peculiar temperament and indefatigable energy, took up his abode in an old hut near the cliffs and worked for several years in clearing the ground and building a tramway by which he intended to take visitors to the top, and in making other improvements. He devised many plans by which he intended to make accessible to strangers what he considered one of nature's grandest pictures, but his limited means and eccentric habits prevented his success. In time he removed and the place reverted to its original conditions. The steep road became a gully, and few ventured up to the summit save lovers of nature, and now and then a strange mortal, who desired to find, within sight of the busy city, quiet, silence, death and a grave.
