= Constitution Park (Maryland) =

Public park in Cumberland

Coordinates: 39°38′57″N 78°44′55″W

Constitution Park is located in Cumberland, Maryland in the East Side Cumberland district. The park has two playgrounds, tennis and basketball courts, several pavilions, a duck pond and a public swimming pool. A museum area contains a train caboose, fire truck, a P-80 dual seat trainer and an M56 Scorpion.

The park is also home to Johnnie Long Ballfield, which hosts Dapper Dan Little League Games. It also includes the Mayor's Monument and a scenic overlook, both directly behind the ballfield.

During the summer, the craft house across from the park pool is used as a day camp. The park also has an amphitheater, where concerts are held throughout the summer.

Constitution Park is maintained by the Cumberland Parks and Recreation Department.
