= Leonard Bahr =

American portrait painter, muralist, illustrator and educator (1905–1990)

- Born: May 12, 1905; Maryland, U.S.
- Died: July 25, 1990 (aged 85)
- Education: Maryland Institute College of Art
- Known for: Painting
- Spouse: Florence Riefle Bahr

Leonard Marion Bahr (May 12, 1905 – July 25, 1990) was an American portrait painter, muralist, illustrator and educator. He worked for many years as a painting professor at the Maryland Institute College of Art (MICA).

== Personal life ==
Leonard Marion Bahr was born on May 12, 1905, in Maryland.

He married Florence E. Riefle, who had been a student at Maryland Institute (now Maryland Institute College of Art), in 1934 and they had three children, Beth, Leonard, and Mary. Leonard died July 25, 1990.

== Artist ==
Bahr created realistic landscape paintings, still lifes and portraits.

Bahr believed that artists have an ability to see beauty in unlikely places, like "an old lady getting on a bus with a basket of fish or a rusty garbage can glistening in the rain, but there's beauty everywhere you look."

— Jack Dawson, A Family of Artists

=== Portraits and paintings with people ===
In 1930, Leonard started his professional painting career while still a student, beginning with two portraits of Baltimore's Mayor Preston. He made portraits of Bishop Noble C. Powell, various doctors and administrators at Johns Hopkins Hospital, and other prominent individuals. The State of Maryland commissioned him to replicate the historical portrait, by John Wollaston, of Daniel Carroll, which is now located on the first floor of the Maryland State House.

Bahr made a painting of his brother, Maurice, at work underneath a Ford Model T automobile. Within the "rough grained" wood frame was a painting made of gray, black and dark brown oil paint. After the initial exhibition at the Baltimore Museum of Art, it traveled in a labor and art tour across the United States.

=== Biblical themes ===
A Christian, Bahr painted Biblical themes, including Christ in War (1964) and an altar painting of Christ at Gethsemane for Our Savior's Evangelical Lutheran Church in Lansdowne, Maryland. He made an illustrated book of his drawings depicting the 23rd Psalm of David that was published in 1933.

=== Murals ===
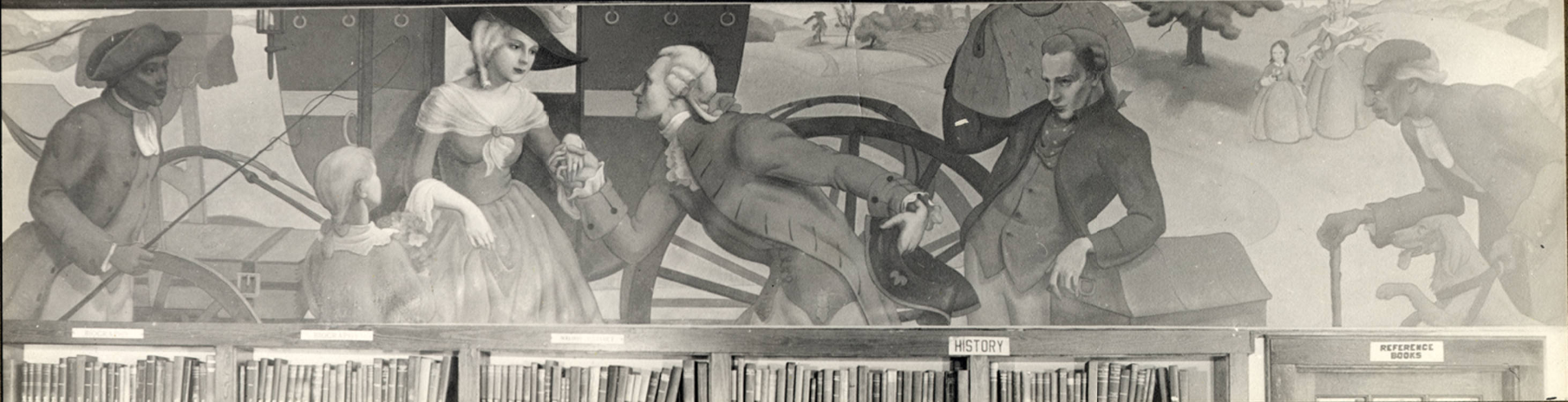
Photograph of Behr's 1934 mural Arrival of Mary Carroll Caton at Castle Thunder, created under the Public Works of Art Project and destroyed in the 1960s

Bahr painted murals for the Public Works of Art Project (1933–34). In 1934 he made the mural of Mary Caroll (Polly) Caton, daughter of lawyer, statesman and Continental Congress representative Charles Carroll. The mural entitled Arrival of Mary Carroll Caton at Castle Thunder was made for the Catonsville High School library. In it, she arrived at the Caton Manor Estate, which was her father's gift to her when she married Richard Caton. It is "presumedly" her husband who greeted her as she exited the carriage. The high school was renovated in the 1960s and the mural was lost in the process. The same year, he made Slaves Rolling Hogsheads of Tobacco Down a Road for the school's library. In it, slaves are rolling casks of tobacco to Elkridge Landing on Rolling Road. Historically slaves rolled the tobacco hogsheads from farms to the Elkridge Landing seaport on the Patapsco River where they would be shipped. A preliminary drawing for the library murals is held at the Smithsonian. He made two more murals for the Baltimore Municipal Aquarium at Druid Hill Park.

=== World War II ===
His service as Lt. Commander in the Navy during World War II, included illustrating Navy life for various military magazines.

=== Other information ===
In April 1933, Bahr exhibited at the first annual exhibition of the Maryland Painters, Sculptors and Printmakers at the Baltimore Museum of Art.

Leonard served on art boards and juries and exhibited his work widely, winning many prizes for his artistic eye. Articles about him or his works were published in American Artist, The Appalachian South, Gardens Houses and People, The Baltimore Sun Magazine, and the Baltimore Sun.

Maryland photographer Emily Hayden took a series of photographs of Bahr painting outdoors, which are in the Maryland Historical Society archives. In December 1980 and January 1981, Maryland Institute College of Art held a retrospective of his fifty years as a painter. In the 1980s he was filmed for a video entitled "A Painter's Portrait."

== Educator ==
Bahr taught beginning and advanced painting classes at the Maryland Institute College of Art for more than 50 years, beginning when he was an undergraduate. He taught day and night classes on the weekdays and Saturdays for much of his career. In 1980, he retired with honors for service. Two years later, he was still teaching one painting class in the fall and spring semesters. Bahr also gave private lessons.

== Collections ==
Leonard's history and artworks have been published and are in private and public collections, including the Academy Art Museum in Easton, Maryland; University of Arizona; the Peabody Conservatory of Music; the Baltimore Museum of Art; the Corcoran Gallery of Art; and the Elkridge Heritage Society.

== Works ==
The following is a selected list of Bahr's works. There are images and information for dozens more works with the Maryland State Archives.

Portraits

- Miss Ruth Baetjer, Union Memorial Hospital, 1974
- Daughter of Dr. and Mrs. Willem Bosma, 1977, Private collection
- Daniel Carroll (1730-1796), oil on canvas, 48 x 38", 1975, Maryland State House, First Floor, Room 107
- The Demuth Children, 1970, The H.E. Demuth Jr. Collection
- Ellen, 1974, Private collection
- May Garrettson Evans, (1866-1947), oil on canvas, 38 x 28", 1947, Peabody Art Collection.
- Dr. George Finney, Johns Hopkins Hospital, 1973
- Florence, 1930
- Mary, 1964
- Mary in Robe, 1948, Private collection
- Nude in Wicker Chair, 1970
- The Rt. Rev. Bishop Noble C. Powell, Episcopal Diocese of Maryland, 1963
- Unknown Man, 1939
- Lois Crawford Winslow, 1939
- Norbert Witt, Noxell Corporation, 1973
- The Seers: Ambrose & Olga Worrall, 1965

Landscapes

- Locust Grove, 1980
- Rain Squall and Sun, 1972
- Rushing Water, 1955
- Valley Landscape, 1970

Other works

- Ballerina Resting
- Big Chair, 1978
- Death and Transfiguration, 1965
- Girl in Straw Hat
- Good Earth, 1952
- Louisiana Belle, 1946
- Pink House, 1936
- Red Cloth, 1960
