= Constitution Park (New Hampshire) =

Constitution Park was a 2005 proposal to pursue eminent domain against the Plainfield, New Hampshire vacation estate of Supreme Court Justice Stephen Breyer, in order to construct a park commemorating the US and New Hampshire Constitutions and providing an interpretive center and lodging for visitors. It came in response to the Supreme Court decision in Kelo v. City of New London.

As with the similar Lost Liberty Hotel, the park's proponents, namely former LPNH Vice-chair Mike Lorrey, the Libertarian Party of New Hampshire, and the Coalition of New Hampshire Taxpayers, advocate that the Kelo decision be used to improve the local tax base, expand economic opportunities in the community, which are "public purposes" under the wording of Kelo. Unlike the Lost Liberty Hotel, the Constitution Park would be a non-profit entity and open to the public for free, and so fits in more of a grey area between private for-profit use (as in the Hotel proposal as well as New London's plans) and strictly public ownership (as in roads, bridges, and other historically proper examples of the commonly accepted purpose of eminent domain).

The Constitution Park proposal was published in newspapers, media websites, and broadcast on television and radio. Apparently, the LPNH and CNHT had been planning a similar proposal for Justice Souter's property in Weare, NH, when they were scooped and co-opted by Logan Darrow Clements and his hotel proposal. When Mike Lorrey found that Breyer owned a significant estate in Plainfield (over 4,500 sq ft (420 m^{2}) in the main house, multiple buildings, and over 100 acres (0.40 km^{2}) of land, as well as another 100 acres (0.40 km^{2}) of adjacent property in Chloe Breyer's name), the proposal was adapted to pursue Breyer's property.

Additional questions were raised when comparisons of the property tax evaluation of the Breyer estate with similar adjacent properties showed that Breyer enjoys a valuation less than half that of his neighbors (according to Plainfield Town Clerk's office).

== Subsequent History ==
New Hampshire legislators, in response to calls by Lorrey, Clements, and LPNH gubernatorial candidate Rich Kahn, passed a proposed state constitutional amendment that will limit eminent domain in the state to property which will be strictly owned by government entities. This amendment was approved by voters (with 85.7% voting in favor) in the November 2006 general election.

== See also ==
- Free State Project
