= Washington Street Historic District (Cumberland, Maryland) =

Historic district in Maryland, United States

- U.S. National Register of Historic Places
- U.S. Historic district
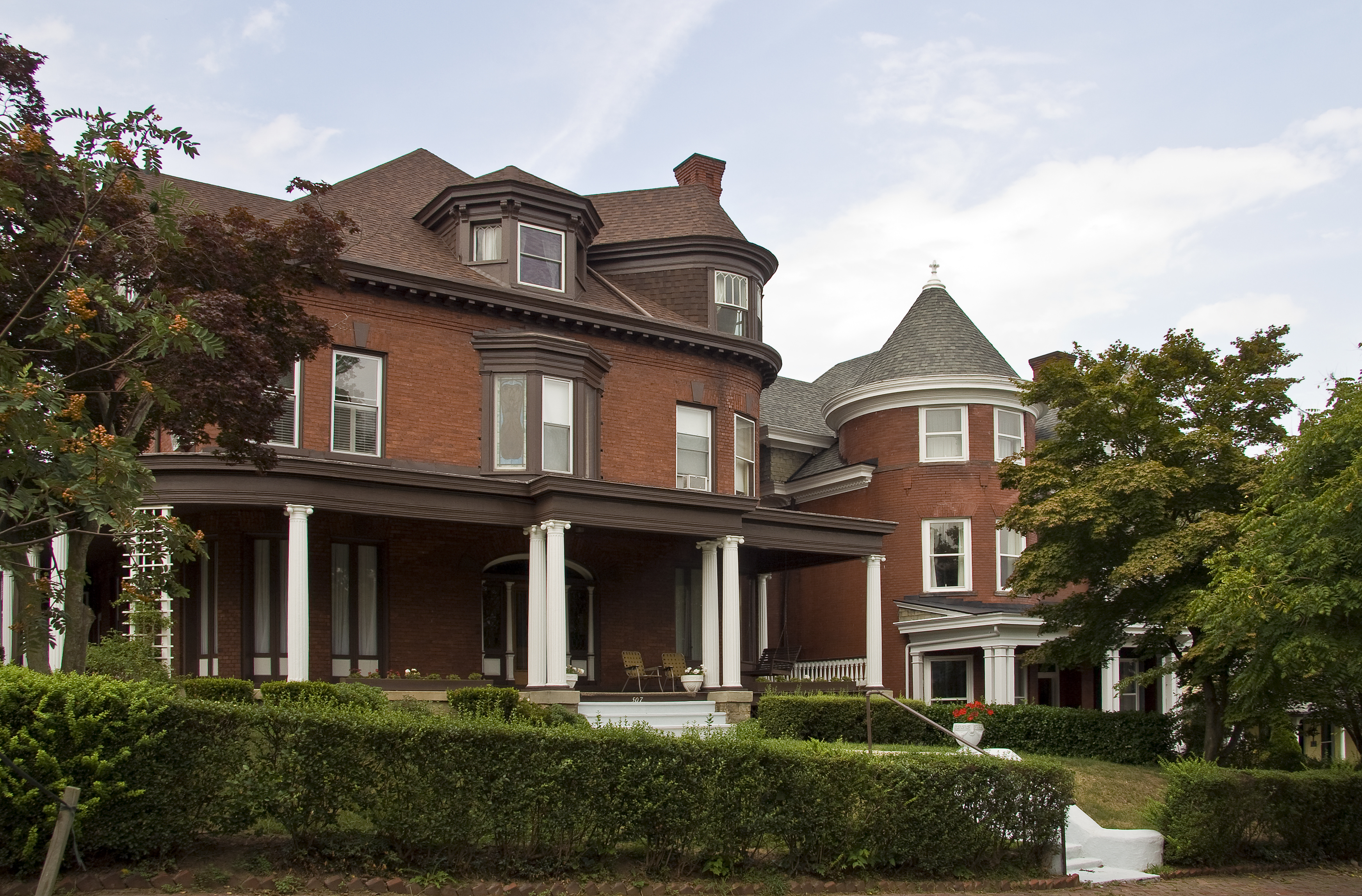

- Location within Maryland Location within the United States
- Interactive map showing the location of Washington Street Historical District
- Location: Washington St. from Wills Creek to mid 600 block, including Prospect Square, Cumberland, Maryland
- Coordinates: 39°39′5″N 78°46′15″W
- Area: 35 acres (14 ha)
- Architect: Notman, John
- Architectural style: Greek Revival, Queen Anne, Federal
- NRHP reference No.: 73000884
- Added to NRHP: February 6, 1973

The Washington Street Historic District is a national historic district named after George Washington in Cumberland, Allegany County, Maryland. It is an approximately 35-acre (140,000 m^{2}) residential area to the west of downtown Cumberland and consists primarily of six blocks of Washington Street. It contains large-scale 19th- and 20th-century houses representing most of the major architectural styles, including examples of Greek Revival, Italianate, Gothic, Queen Anne, Romanesque, Colonial Revival, and bungalow. Also included in the district are the 1890s Romanesque courthouse, the 1850s Greek Revival academy building, and the Algonquin Hotel. It was listed on the National Register of Historic Places in 1973.

The Washington Street Historic District is home to the Washington Street Library, the Circuit Courthouse for Allegany County, the Allegany County Board of Education, and the Allegany County Historical Society. The remains of Fort Cumberland are also in the Washington Street Historic District.
