= Allegany College of Maryland =

Community college in Cumberland, Maryland, US

Coordinates: 39°39′10″N 78°43′45″W

- Former name: Allegany Community College
- Type: Public community college
- Established: 1961
- President: David R. Jones
- Location: Cumberland, Maryland; Everett, Pennsylvania
- Campus: 316 acres
- Colors: Green, navy blue, and gray
- Sporting affiliations: NJCAA
- Mascot: Trojans
- Website: www.allegany.edu

Allegany College of Maryland (or ACM) is a public community college in Cumberland, Maryland. It was previously known as Allegany Community College. The college was founded in 1961 and is accredited by the Middle State Commission on Higher Education. The college offers 48 two-year degree programs, 31 certificate programs, and 10 letters of recognitions. The college also has campuses and extension sites in Cumberland, Maryland; Everett, Pennsylvania; Oakland, Maryland; Somerset, Pennsylvania; and LaVale, Maryland.

== History ==
Allegany College of Maryland began operations in 1961 as "Allegany Community College" in a segregationist era all-black Carver Community School that had been closed in 1959 by the Allegany County Board of Education following the integration of public schools in 1955. The college opened with an enrollment of 102 students from Allegany County under the direction of ACM's first president, Robert S. Zimmer.

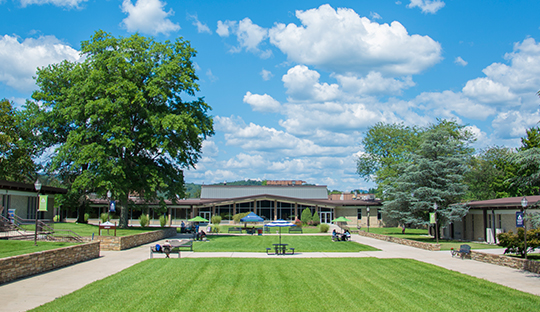
ACM Cumberland Campus, view of College Center, Learning Commons, Humanities Building

In 1969, the college moved to a new campus consisting of six buildings on a 316-acre (1.3 km^{2}) tract in suburban Cumberland that was partially funded by the Appalachian Regional Commission. Enrollment reached the 800 mark in credit programs during the first year on the new campus and community service and continuing education courses and programs began. Since that time, the campus has expanded to include 15 buildings, which provide modern facilities for both credit and non-credit students. On-site campus housing is available.

The college and Allegany County government partnered to establish Western Maryland Works, a makerspace partnership, in 2018. The college purchased the Western Maryland Works & Makerspace building in the fall of 2024.

The college opened its Bedford County Campus in Everett, Pennsylvania in 1990, and offers college credit through the adjacent Bedford County Technical Center.

The college constructed a Western Regional Correctional Training Center in 2021, and underwent a $13.6 million renovation of its Technology Building.

The college serves 3,418 credit students and over 6,900 continuing education registrations.

== Academics ==
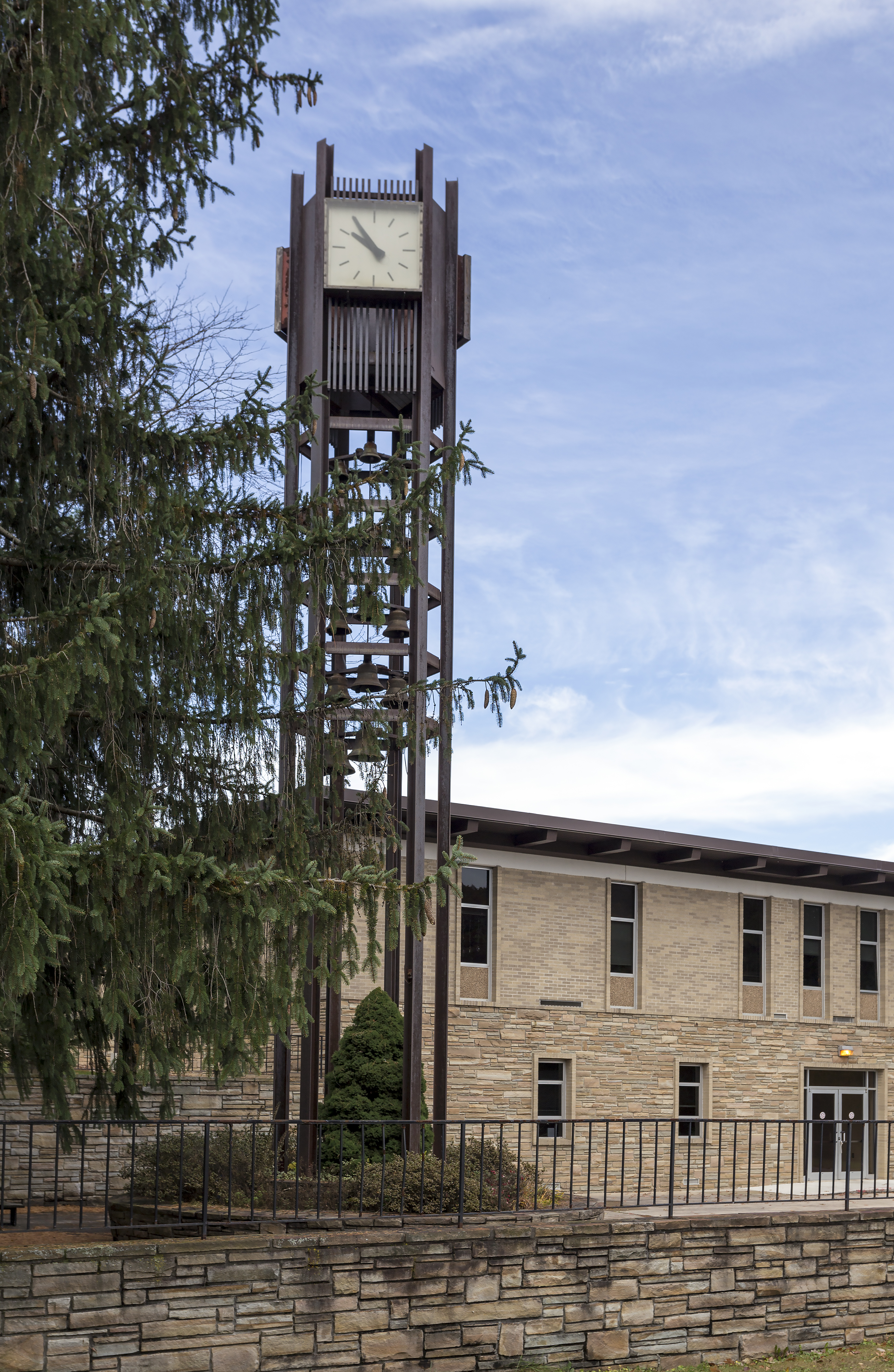
Allegany College of Maryland's bell tower, side view of College Center

The college offers 31 associate degree programs, 30 certificate programs, and 10 letter of recognition programs. ACM is one of two Maryland community colleges to be classified as a "community engaged" institution.

The college offers three clinics that are open to the community: a Dental Hygiene Clinic (fall and spring semesters), Nurse Managed Wellness Clinic (fall and spring semester, summer session), and Massage Therapy Clinic (offered in spring semester).

== Athletics ==
The college's men's baseball and basketball teams have been consistently ranked in the top 20 of their respective National Junior College Athletic Association (NJCAA) Divisions. The baseball team participated in the NJCAA World Series nine times, including a four-year run from 1994 to 1997. Steve Bazarnic coached and mentored several Major League Baseball players and coaches, including John Kruk, Scott Seabol, Joe Beimel, and Bill Brown (baseball coach)

The men's basketball team participated thirteen times in the NJCAA national tournament, including a four-year run from 1985 to 1988, 1991, 1993, 1996 (finished 2nd), 1998, 2001 (finished 2nd), 2002, 2003, 2009 and 2019.

Bob Kirk coached the men's basketball team from 1971 until 2004. Kirk mentored numerous All-Americans and a handful of future NBA picks including Steve Francis, Eric Mobley, and John Turner (basketball) and standouts Terrance Jacobs and Davonn Harp.

Women's basketball participated in the NJCAA National Tournament four times - 1986, 1993 (2nd), 2009 and 2011. Men's tennis participated in the NJCAA National Championships three times - 1971, 1976 and 1977.

== Governance and accreditation ==
The Maryland Higher Education Commission (MHEC) oversees and coordinates higher education in the State of Maryland including academic and financial policies at the college. An eight-member board of trustees, appointed by the Governor of the State of Maryland, governs the college. The college also has an advisory board, the Bedford County Campus Advisory Committee, for its Bedford County Campus in Everett (Bedford County, Pennsylvania).

The college is a member of the Maryland Association of Community Colleges (MACC) and is accredited by the Middle States Commission on Higher Education. The college is also approved for operation by MHEC. The Pennsylvania Department of Education has granted certification to the ACM Bedford County Campus and to the academic programs its offers.
