= Washington Street Library =

Library

Coordinates: 39°39′3.39″N 78°45′59.3″W

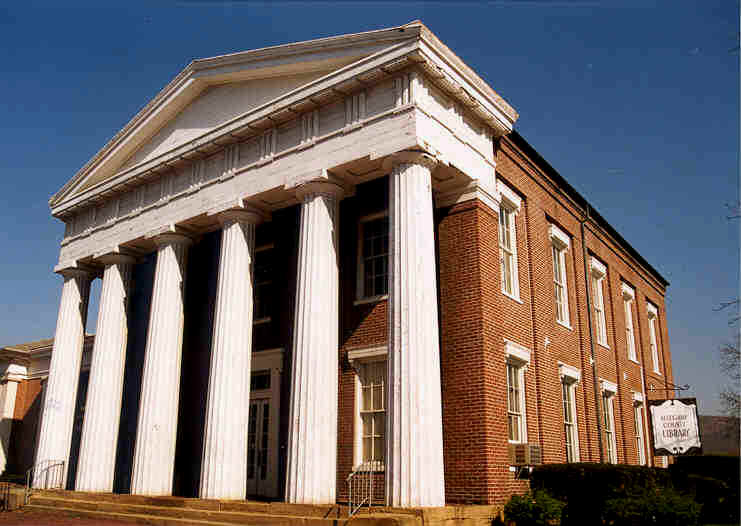
The library in 2006

The Washington Street Library is located in the historic district of Cumberland, Maryland. This Greek Revival style building was constructed between 1849 and 1850, as a larger building for the Allegany County Academy, the first public school in Allegany County, which was founded in 1799. The library first opened its doors on June 19, 1934. A new addition was constructed in 1966, allowing for the expansion of the library collection.

Today, the Washington Street Library houses the largest reference collection in the Allegany County Library System, and offers an extensive local history area in the Maryland Room. Free internet access, books on tape, interlibrary loan services, and a collection of fiction and non-fiction materials are some of the services offered. Children's programs take place weekly.

== See also ==
- Washington Street Historic District
