= Cumberland, Maryland =

City in Maryland, United States

- City
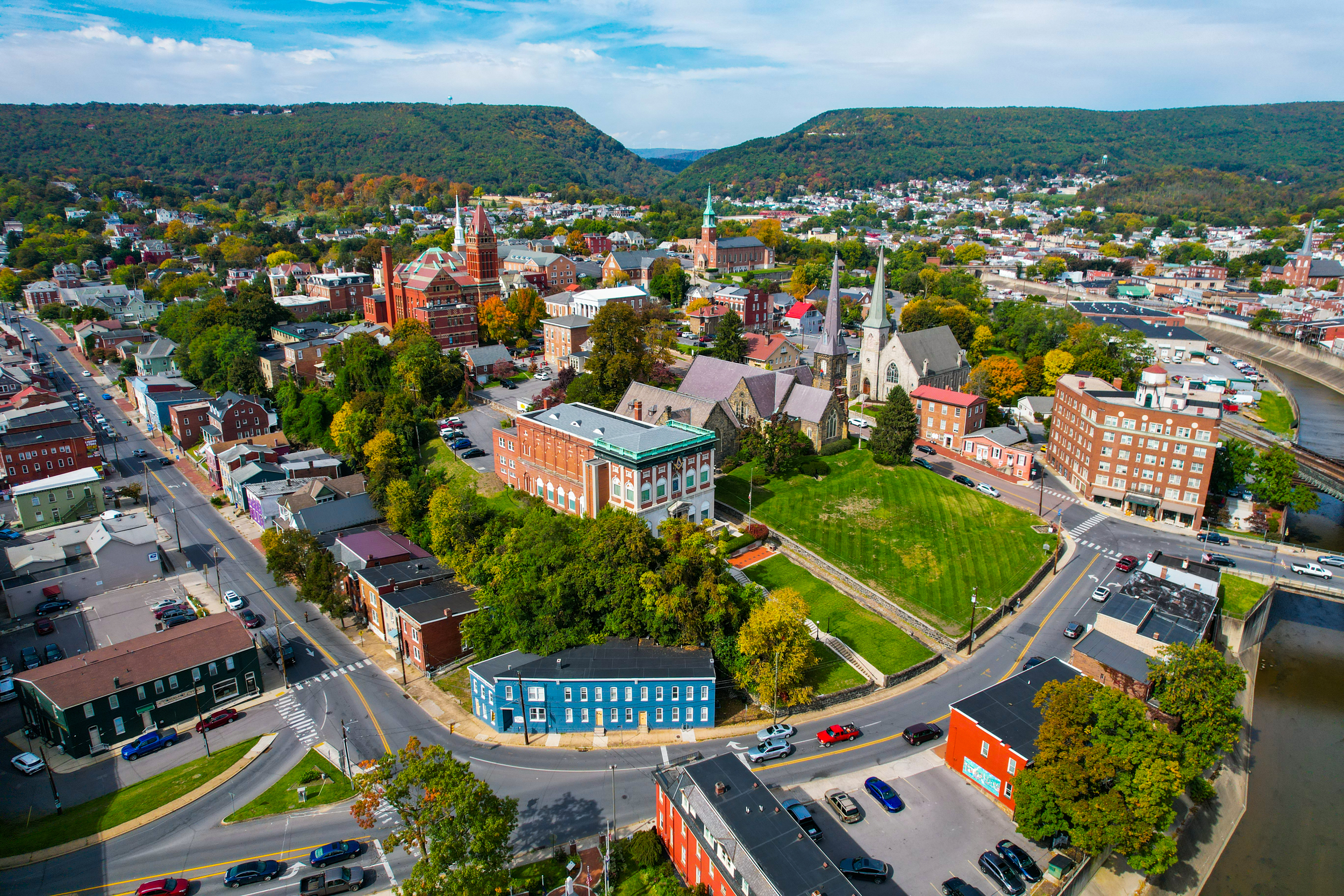
- Washington St. and Greene St. in Cumberland

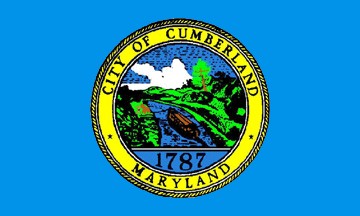
- Flag Seal
- Nicknames: "Queen City"
- Motto: "Come for a Visit, Stay for Life!"
- Interactive map of Cumberland, Maryland
- Location within Maryland Location within the United States
- Coordinates: 39°39′10″N 78°45′45″W
- Country: United States
- State: Maryland
- County: Allegany
- Founded: 1787
- Incorporated: January 23, 1815

Government
  - Type: Council-CEO

Area
  - Total: 10.12 sq mi (26.22 km^{2})
  - Land: 10.05 sq mi (26.04 km^{2})
  - Water: 0.069 sq mi (0.18 km^{2})
- Elevation: 640 ft (200 m)

Population (2020)
  - Total: 19,076
  - Density: 1,897/sq mi (732/km^{2})
  - Demonym: Cumberlander
- Time zone: UTC−5 (Eastern (EST))
  - Summer (DST): UTC−4 (EDT)
- ZIP Codes: 21501–21505
- Area codes: 301, 240
- FIPS code: 24-21325
- GNIS feature ID: 2390580
- Website: www.cumberlandmd.gov

Cumberland is a city in Allegany County, Maryland, United States, and its county seat. The city had a population of 19,075 at the 2020 census. Located on the Potomac River, Cumberland is a regional business and commercial center for Western Maryland and the Potomac Highlands of West Virginia. It is the primary city of the Cumberland micropolitan area, which had 95,044 residents in 2020.

Historically, Cumberland was known as the "Queen City" as it was once the second largest in the state. Because of its strategic location on what became known as the Cumberland Road through the Appalachians, after the American Revolution it served as a historical outfitting and staging point for westward emigrant trail migrations throughout the first half of the 1800s. In this role, it supported the settlement of the Ohio Country and the lands in that latitude of the Louisiana Purchase. It also became an industrial center, served by major roads, railroads, and the Chesapeake and Ohio Canal, which connected Cumberland to Washington, D.C., and is now a national historical park. Interstate 68 bisects the town.

Industry declined after World War II, leading urban, business, and technological development in the state to be concentrated in eastern coastal cities. The Cumberland micropolitan area is one of the poorest in the United States, ranking 707th out of 935 metropolitan and micropolitan areas in per capita income, according to the 2023 American Community Survey.

== History ==
Cumberland was named by English colonists after the son of King George II, Prince William, the Duke of Cumberland. It is built on the site of the mid-18th century Fort Cumberland, the starting point for British General Edward Braddock's ill-fated attack on the French stronghold of Fort Duquesne (present-day Pittsburgh) during the French and Indian War, the North American front of the Seven Years' War between the French and the British. (See Braddock expedition.) This area had been settled for thousands of years by indigenous peoples. The fort was developed along the Great Indian Warpath which tribes used to travel the backcountry.

Cumberland also served as an outpost of Colonel George Washington during the French and Indian War, and his first military headquarters was built here. Washington returned as President of the United States in 1794 to Cumberland to review troops assembled to thwart the Whiskey Rebellion.

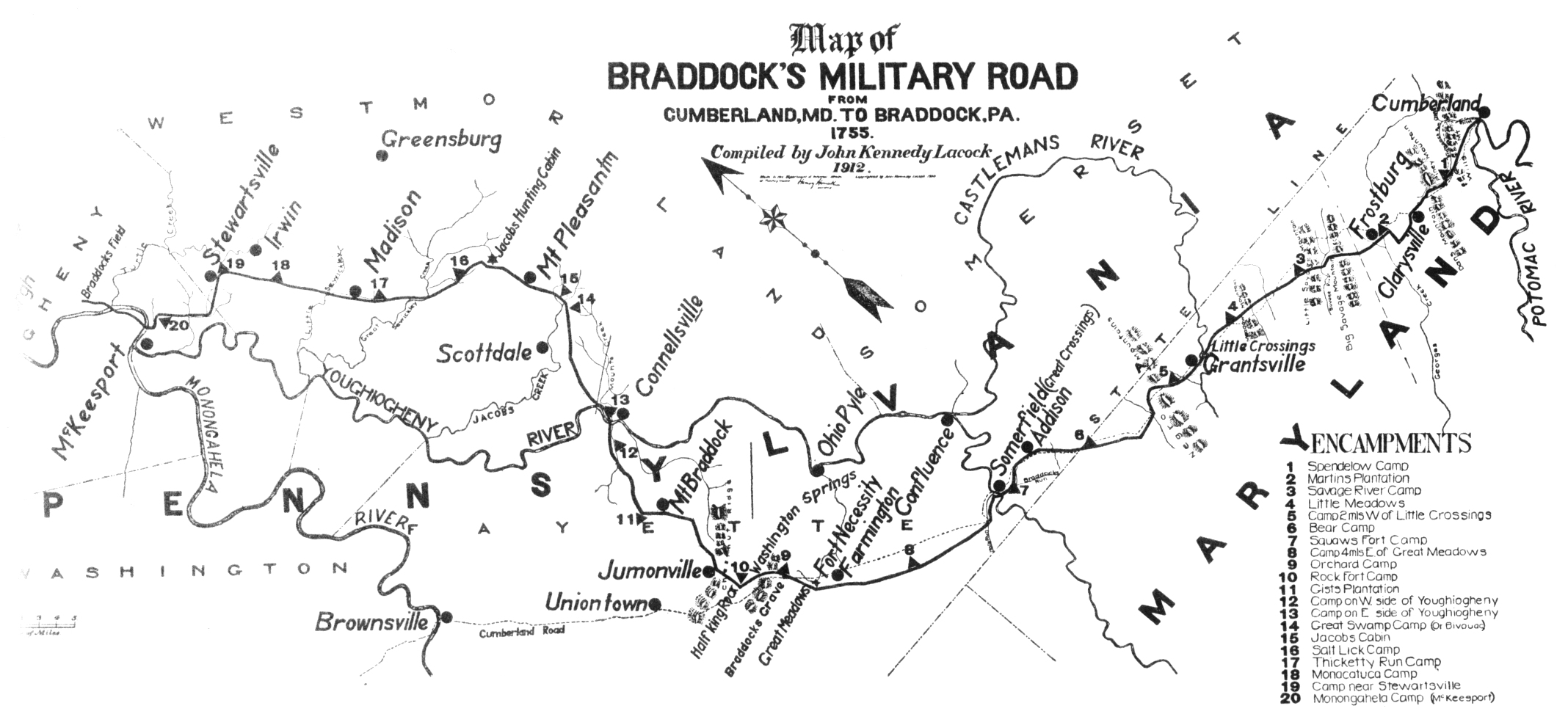
Map of Braddock's Military Road

During the 19th century, Cumberland was a key road, railroad, and canal junction. It became the second-largest city in Maryland after the port city of Baltimore. It was nicknamed "The Queen City". Cumberland was the terminus, and namesake, of the Cumberland Road (begun in 1811) that extended westward to the Ohio River at Wheeling, West Virginia. This was the first portion of what would be constructed as the National Road, which eventually reached Ohio, Indiana, and Illinois. In the 1850s, many black fugitives reached their final stop on the Underground Railroad beneath the floor of the Emmanuel Episcopal Church. A maze of tunnels beneath and an abolitionist pastor above provided refuge before the final five mile trip to freedom in Pennsylvania.

The surrounding hillsides were mined for coal and iron ore and were harvested for timber that helped supply the Industrial Revolution. The Chesapeake and Ohio Canal had its western terminus here; it was built to improve the movement of goods between the Midwest and Washington, DC, the eastern terminus. Construction of railroads superseded use of the canal, as trains were faster and could carry more freight. The city developed as a major manufacturing center, with industries in glass, breweries, fabrics, tires, and tinplate.

With the restructuring of heavy industry in the Northeast and Mid-Atlantic states following World War II, the city lost many jobs. As a result, its population has declined by more than half, from 39,483 in the 1940 census to fewer than 20,000 today.

In 1912, President Theodore Roosevelt gave a speech from the Cumberland City Hall.

== Geography ==
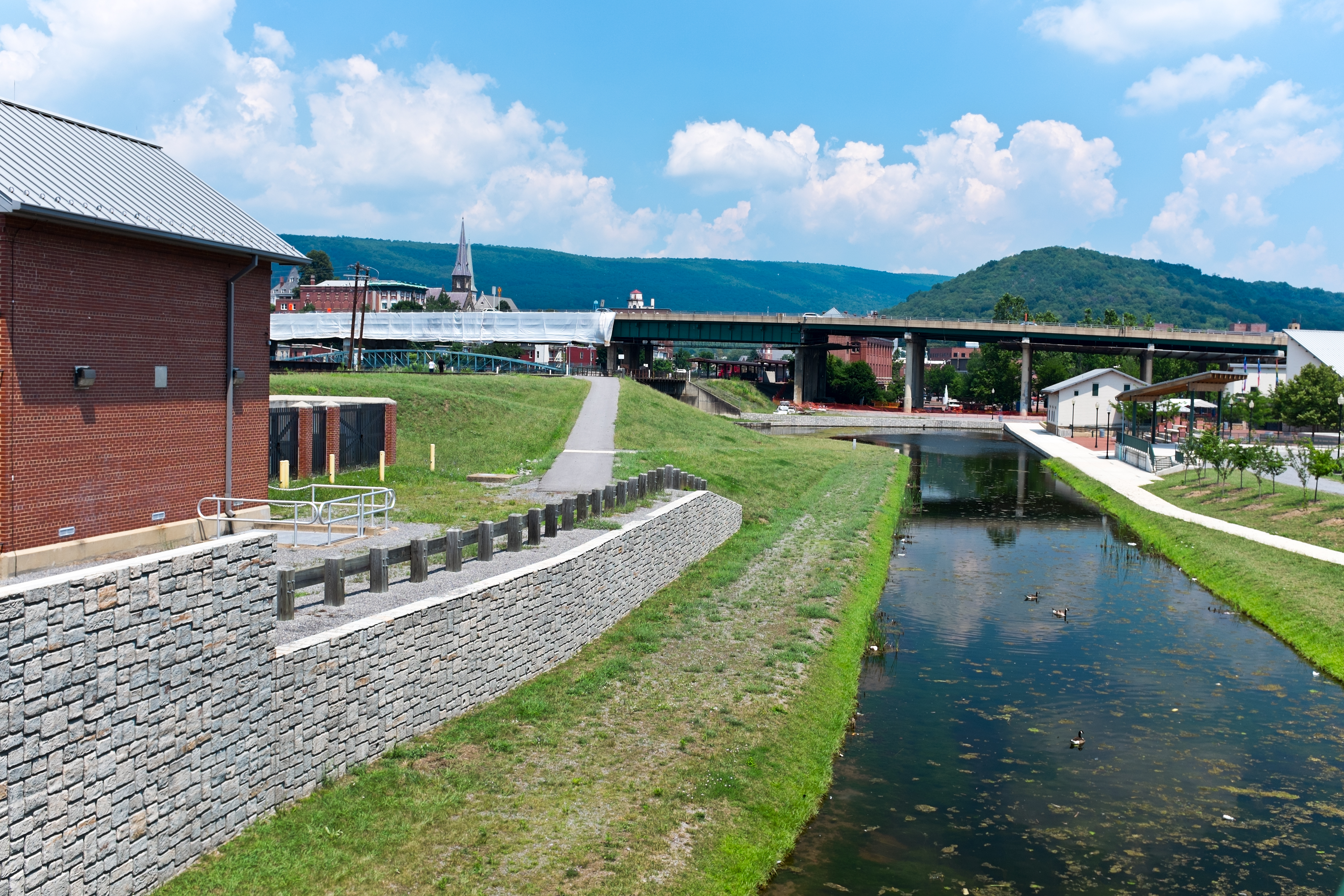
Terminus of the Chesapeake and Ohio Canal in Cumberland. Highway bridge is Interstate 68. From left to right behind the highway bridge: Cumberland Masonic Temple, Emmanuel Episcopal Church, Canal Place Museum.

Cumberland is in the Ridge-and-Valley Appalachians at the junction of the North Branch Potomac River and Wills Creek. The majority of the land within the city lies in a valley created by the junction of these two streams. Interstate 68 runs through the city in an east–west direction, as does Alternate U.S. 40, the Old National Road. U.S. Highway 220 runs north–south. Parts of Wills Mountain, Haystack Mountain, and Shriver Ridge are also within the city limits. Opposite Cumberland along the Potomac River is Ridgeley, West Virginia.

The abandoned Chesapeake and Ohio Canal is now part of the Chesapeake and Ohio Canal National Historical Park. The canal's towpath is maintained, allowing travel by foot, horse or bicycle between Cumberland and Washington, D.C., a distance of approximately 185 miles (298 km). In recent years, a separate trail/path extension, called the Great Allegheny Passage, has been developed that leads to Pittsburgh as its western terminus. Cumberland is the only city of at least 20,000 residents, outside of the Pittsburgh and DC metro areas, that lies on this combined 300+ mile stretch.

According to the United States Census Bureau, the city has a total area of 10.15 square miles (26.29 km^{2}), of which 10.08 square miles (26.11 km^{2}) is land and 0.07 square miles (0.18 km^{2}) is water.

=== Climate ===
Cumberland lies at the beginning of the transition from a humid continental climate (Köppen Dfa) to a humid subtropical climate (Cfa), although bearing far more characteristics of the former, with a range of temperatures significantly lower than those in the central and eastern part of Maryland, mostly in the form of depressed nighttime lows.

The region has four distinct seasons, with hot, humid summers, and moderate winters (compared to surrounding communities, Cumberland receives milder winters and less snow). Monthly daily mean temperatures range from 31.9 °F (−0.1 °C) in January to 76.8 °F (24.9 °C) in July, with temperatures exceeding 90 °F (32 °C) on 34.5 days of the year and dipping to 10 °F (−12 °C) or below on 7 nights per winter. Average seasonal snowfall totals 30.3 inches (77 cm). The record high is 109 °F (43 °C) set in July 1936 and August 1918, both of which are state record highs, while the record low is −14 °F (−26 °C) set at the current site on January 18–19, 1994, and January 20–21, 1985.

Climate data for Cumberland 2, Maryland (1991−2020 normals, extremes 1974−present)
Month	Jan	Feb	Mar	Apr	May	Jun	Jul	Aug	Sep	Oct	Nov	Dec	Year
Record high °F (°C)	75 (24)	83 (28)	90 (32)	96 (36)	98 (37)	103 (39)	105 (41)	105 (41)	102 (39)	94 (34)	87 (31)	80 (27)	105 (41)
Mean daily maximum °F (°C)	39.2 (4.0)	43.4 (6.3)	53.0 (11.7)	66.3 (19.1)	74.6 (23.7)	82.5 (28.1)	87.1 (30.6)	85.4 (29.7)	78.5 (25.8)	66.8 (19.3)	53.9 (12.2)	42.9 (6.1)	64.5 (18.1)
Daily mean °F (°C)	30.8 (−0.7)	33.7 (0.9)	42.1 (5.6)	53.6 (12.0)	62.9 (17.2)	71.3 (21.8)	75.8 (24.3)	74.0 (23.3)	66.8 (19.3)	55.0 (12.8)	43.7 (6.5)	35.0 (1.7)	53.7 (12.1)
Mean daily minimum °F (°C)	22.5 (−5.3)	23.9 (−4.5)	31.2 (−0.4)	40.9 (4.9)	51.2 (10.7)	60.1 (15.6)	64.4 (18.0)	62.7 (17.1)	55.0 (12.8)	43.2 (6.2)	33.5 (0.8)	27.1 (−2.7)	43.0 (6.1)
Record low °F (°C)	−14 (−26)	−3 (−19)	3 (−16)	20 (−7)	25 (−4)	39 (4)	46 (8)	38 (3)	31 (−1)	20 (−7)	10 (−12)	−8 (−22)	−14 (−26)
Average precipitation inches (mm)	2.79 (71)	2.38 (60)	3.42 (87)	3.41 (87)	4.22 (107)	3.87 (98)	3.73 (95)	3.40 (86)	3.55 (90)	2.82 (72)	2.58 (66)	3.05 (77)	39.22 (996)
Average snowfall inches (cm)	8.2 (21)	7.7 (20)	6.8 (17)	0.1 (0.25)	0.0 (0.0)	0.0 (0.0)	0.0 (0.0)	0.0 (0.0)	0.0 (0.0)	0.0 (0.0)	0.5 (1.3)	5.4 (14)	28.7 (73)
Average precipitation days (≥ 0.01 in)	12.6	10.9	12.1	12.6	14.4	12.4	10.9	10.7	10.0	9.4	9.1	11.3	136.4
Average snowy days (≥ 0.1 in)	3.5	3.4	2.1	0.1	0.0	0.0	0.0	0.0	0.0	0.0	0.3	2.1	11.5
Source: NOAA

== Demographics ==
Historical population
Census	Pop.	Note	%±
1840	2,428		—
1850	6,073		150.1%
1860	4,078		−32.9%
1870	8,056		97.5%
1880	10,693		32.7%
1890	12,729		19.0%
1900	17,128		34.6%
1910	21,839		27.5%
1920	29,837		36.6%
1930	37,747		26.5%
1940	39,483		4.6%
1950	37,679		−4.6%
1960	33,415		−11.3%
1970	29,724		−11.0%
1980	25,933		−12.8%
1990	23,706		−8.6%
2000	21,518		−9.2%
2010	20,859		−3.1%
2020	19,076		−8.5%
2022 (est.)	18,769		−1.6%
U.S. Decennial Census

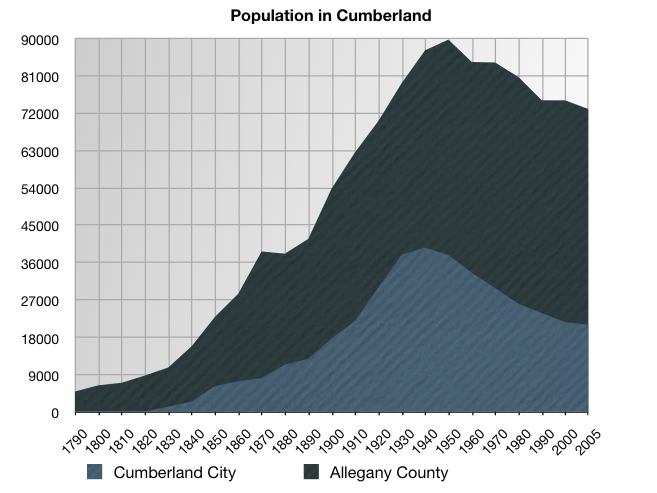
A graph showing the population in Cumberland and Allegany County

=== 2020 census ===
As of the 2020 census, Cumberland had a population of 19,076. The median age was 43.5 years. 20.1% of residents were under the age of 18 and 23.3% of residents were 65 years of age or older. For every 100 females there were 91.6 males, and for every 100 females age 18 and over there were 88.0 males age 18 and over.

99.1% of residents lived in urban areas, while 0.9% lived in rural areas.

There were 8,651 households in Cumberland, of which 23.9% had children under the age of 18 living in them. Of all households, 31.0% were married-couple households, 23.6% were households with a male householder and no spouse or partner present, and 36.8% were households with a female householder and no spouse or partner present. About 41.3% of all households were made up of individuals and 20.0% had someone living alone who was 65 years of age or older.

There were 10,781 housing units, of which 19.8% were vacant. The homeowner vacancy rate was 3.2% and the rental vacancy rate was 12.7%.

Racial composition as of the 2020 census
Race	Number	Percent
White	16,203	84.9%
Black or African American	1,137	6.0%
American Indian and Alaska Native	60	0.3%
Asian	206	1.1%
Native Hawaiian and Other Pacific Islander	3	0.0%
Some other race	152	0.8%
Two or more races	1,315	6.9%
Hispanic or Latino (of any race)	386	2.0%

=== 2010 census ===
As of the census of 2010, there were 20,859 people, 9,223 households, and 4,982 families residing in the city. The population density was 2,069.3 inhabitants per square mile (799.0/km^{2}). There were 10,914 housing units at an average density of 1,082.7 per square mile (418.0/km^{2}). The racial makeup of the city was 89.4% White, 6.4% African American, 0.2% Native American, 0.9% Asian, 0.1% Pacific Islander, 0.3% from other races, and 2.8% from two or more races. Hispanic or Latino people of any race were 1.2% of the population.

There were 9,223 households, of which 25.9% had children under the age of 18 living with them, 34.0% were married couples living together, 15.1% had a female householder with no husband present, 4.9% had a male householder with no wife present, and 46.0% were non-families. 38.9% of all households were made up of individuals, and 18.1% had someone living alone who was 65 years of age or older. The average household size was 2.19 and the average family size was 2.89.

The median age in the city was 41.4 years. 20.9% of residents were under the age of 18; 10.2% were between the ages of 18 and 24; 23.1% were from 25 to 44; 26.2% were from 45 to 64; and 19.6% were 65 years of age or older. The gender makeup of the city was 47.0% male and 53.0% female.

=== 2000 census ===
The median household income was $25,142, and the median family income was $34,500. Males had a median income of $29,484 versus $20,004 for females. The per capita income for the city was $15,813. About 15.3% of families and 19.8% of the population were below the poverty line, including 29.4% of those under age 18 and 10.3% of those age 65 or over. The Cumberland, MD-WV Metropolitan Statistical Area ranked 305th out of 318 metropolitan areas in per capita income.

== Economy ==
The top employers in Cumberland are as follows.

Employer	Employees (2021)	Employees (2012)
Western Maryland Regional Medical	2,200	2,290
Frostburg State University	1,005	NR
CSX Transportation	635	1,396
Western Correctional Institution	588	NR
North Branch Correctional Institution	574	NR
WebstaurantStore	438	NR
Conduent	380	NR
Rocky Gap Casino Resort	337	NR
Aspira/ReserveAmerica	325	NR
Columbia Gas of Maryland	NR	900
Allegany College of Maryland	NR	559
Friends Aware	NR	227
CareFirst BlueCross BlueShield of Maryland	NR	180
Human Resources Development Commission	NR	160
YMCA–Riverside	NR	151
PharmaCare	NR	150
CBIZ	NR	125

== Arts and culture ==
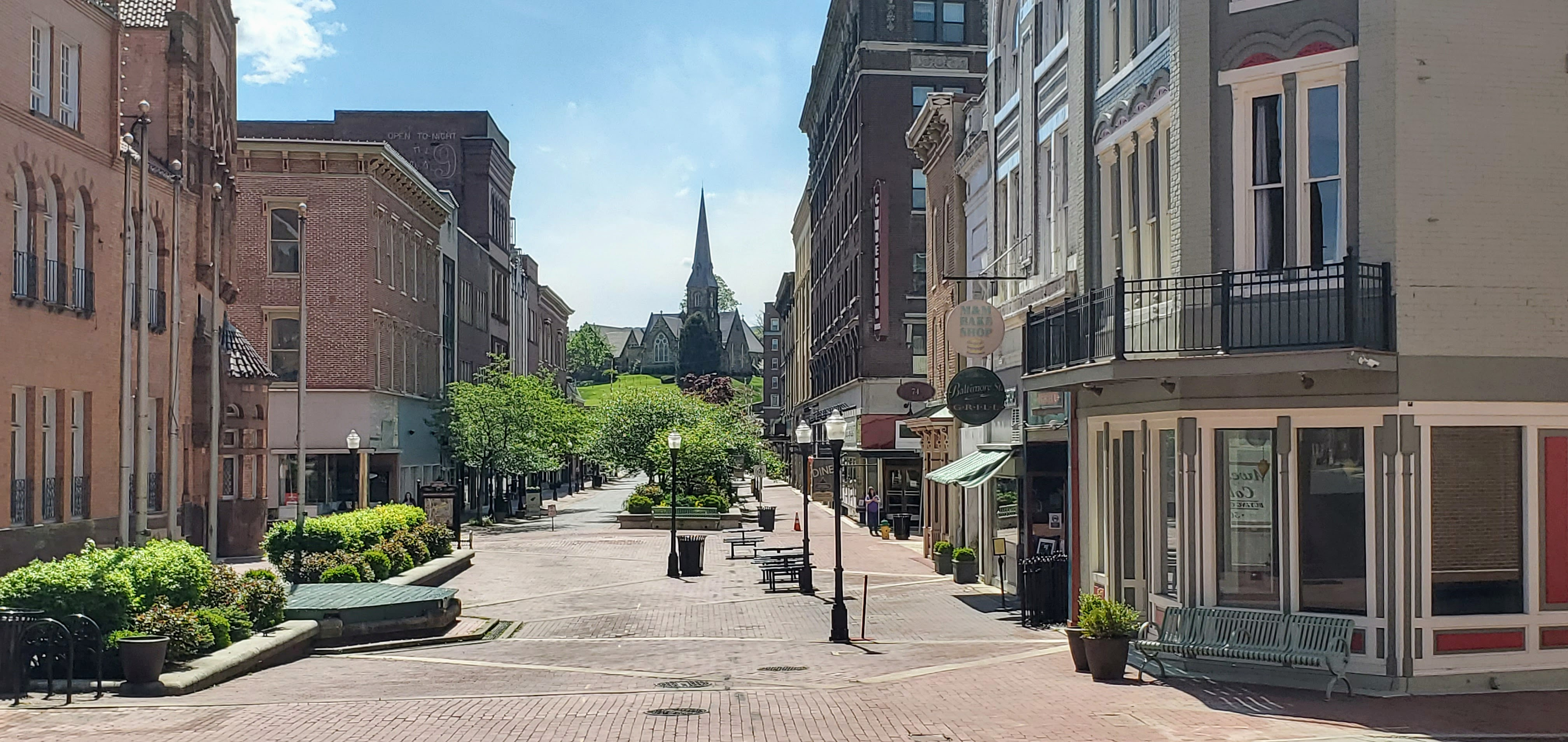
Downtown Cumberland, Maryland

=== Attractions ===
==== Western Maryland Railway Station ====
Located at the Western Maryland Railway Station is the Western Maryland Scenic Railroad.

==== Arts and entertainment district ====
Located in Cumberland's arts and entertainment district is Saville Gallery, the Allegany Museum, the Cumberland Theatre, the Arts at Canal Place Cooperative Gallery, the New Embassy Theatre, the Cumberland Music Academy, MettleArts Studio and Foundry, the Arteco Gallery and Institute for Creative Enterprise, Windsor Hall, the Gilchrist Museum of the Arts, the Gordon-Roberts House, the Graphicus Atelier print-making studio, and a variety of retail and specialty stores. Seasonal events include the Cumberland Comes Alive music series, Saturday Arts Walks, and the annual Mountain Maryland Artists' Studio Tour.

==== Canal Place Heritage Area ====
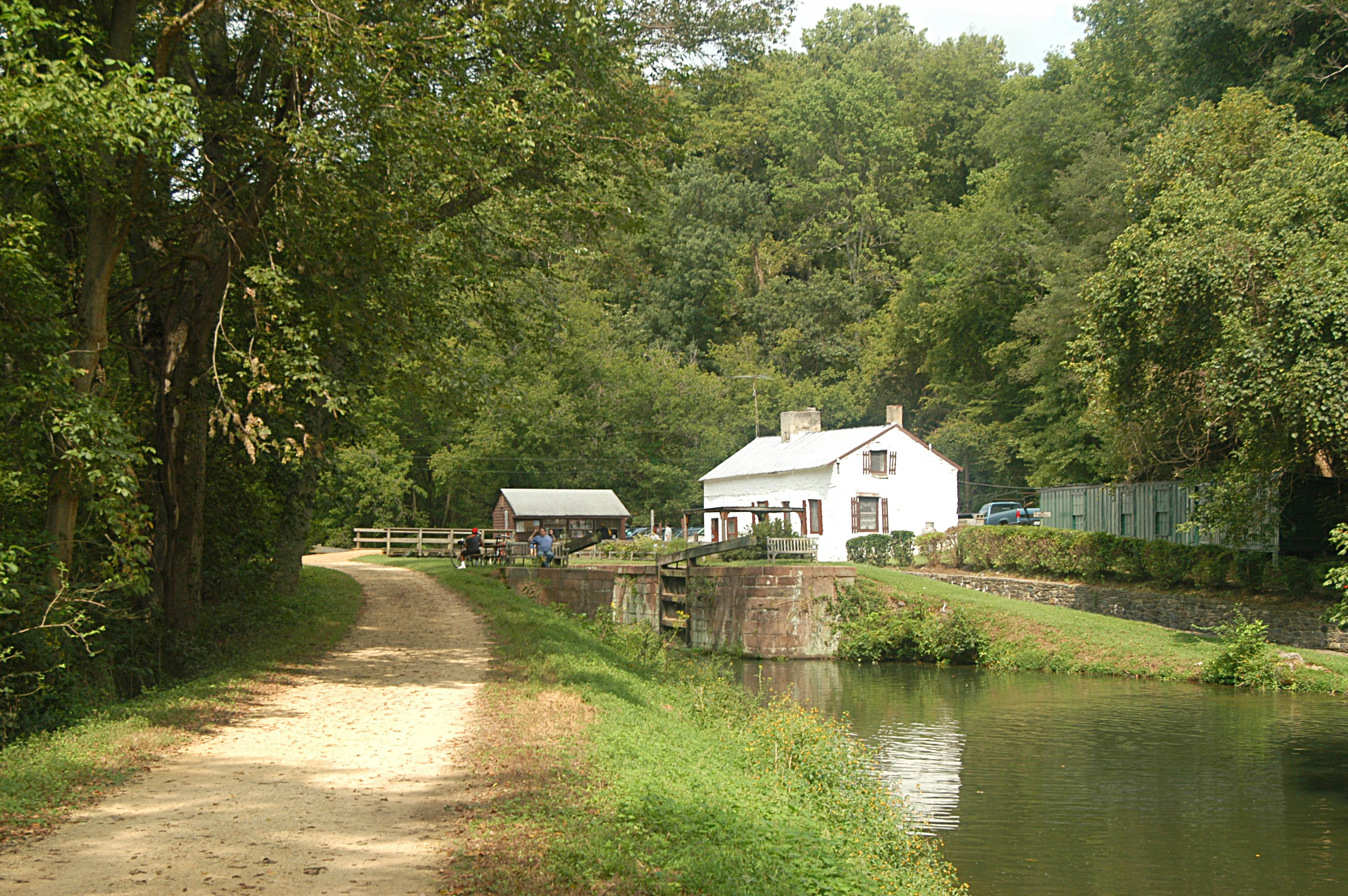
Chesapeake and Ohio Canal at Swain's Lock

The Chesapeake and Ohio Canal National Historical Park is located at Canal Place, the western terminus of the Chesapeake and Ohio Canal, and intersection of the railroad, canal, and Allegheny Highlands Trail of Maryland.

==== Allegany Museum ====
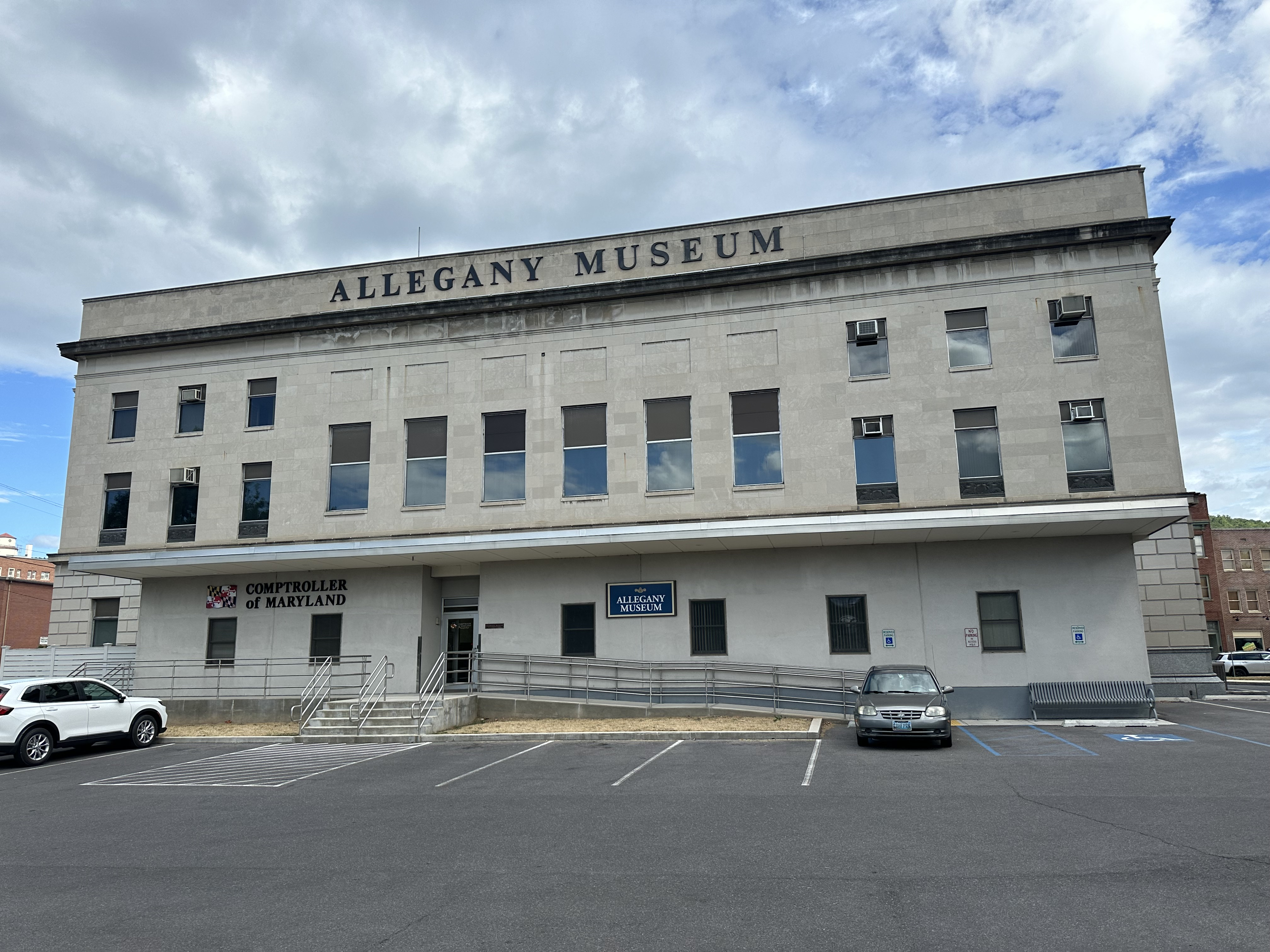
Allegany Museum

Allegany Museum exhibits include local prehistoric life, the Cumberland glassware industry, Kelly Springfield Tire Company, MeadWestvaco, the Cumberland brewing industry, and folk art on the building's second floor.

==== The Narrows and Lovers Leap ====
The Narrows is a compact notched valley that Wills Creek has carved into Wills Mountain. Inventor Frederick John Bahr bought Wills Mountain and built his log cabin on top.

The National Road (U.S. Route 40) and a number of railroad lines pass through this steep, narrow, and rocky river valley on the edge of Cumberland. On the northeast side of Wills Mountain, sits a rocky outcropping known as Lover's Leap. The name comes from a Native American Romeo and Juliet legend. The tale tells how a jilted lover met his end by jumping off this ledge. Today, the rocks high above the water provide extensive views of the Allegheny Mountains. Lover's Leap has been frequently romanticized by postcard pictures of this valley, including those taken by George Steward in 1950 and published in the 1953 book U.S. 40.

Lover's Leap is 1,652 feet (504 m) above sea level and made up of oddly squared projections of rock, from its top, all the way down to the National Highway (U.S. Rte. 40) below. The city of Cumberland and the neighboring states of Pennsylvania and West Virginia may be seen from this point.

=== Other attractions ===
- Constitution Park
- Cumberland Theatre Company, located on N. Johnson St., offering year-round performances
- Gene Mason Sports Complex
- New Embassy Theater

=== Nearby attractions and points of interest ===
- The Thrasher Carriage Museum, in Frostburg, Maryland, has one of the nation's top collections of horse-drawn vehicles, representing every walk of life, from the milkman to the wealthy. Pleasure vehicles, funeral wagons, sleighs, carts, and more are on display in the renovated 19th-century warehouse. Housed in a renovated warehouse opposite the steam train depot in Frostburg, this museum houses an extensive collection of late 19th- and early 20th-century horse-drawn carriages, featuring more than 50 vehicles from the collection of the late James R. Thrasher. Highlights include the inaugural coach used by Teddy Roosevelt, several Vanderbilt sleighs, elaborately decorated funeral wagons, formal closed vehicles, surreys, and open sleighs.
- The Paw Paw Tunnel is one of the world's longest canal tunnels and was one of the greatest engineering feats of its day.
- The Sideling Hill road cut is a 340-foot (100 m) deep road cut where Interstate 68 cuts through Sideling Hill. It is notable as an impressive man-made mountain pass, visible from miles away and one of the best rock exposures in Maryland and indeed in the entire northeastern United States. Almost 810 feet (250 m) of strata in a tightly folded syncline are exposed in this road cut.
- Dan's Mountain State Park

=== Notable landmarks ===
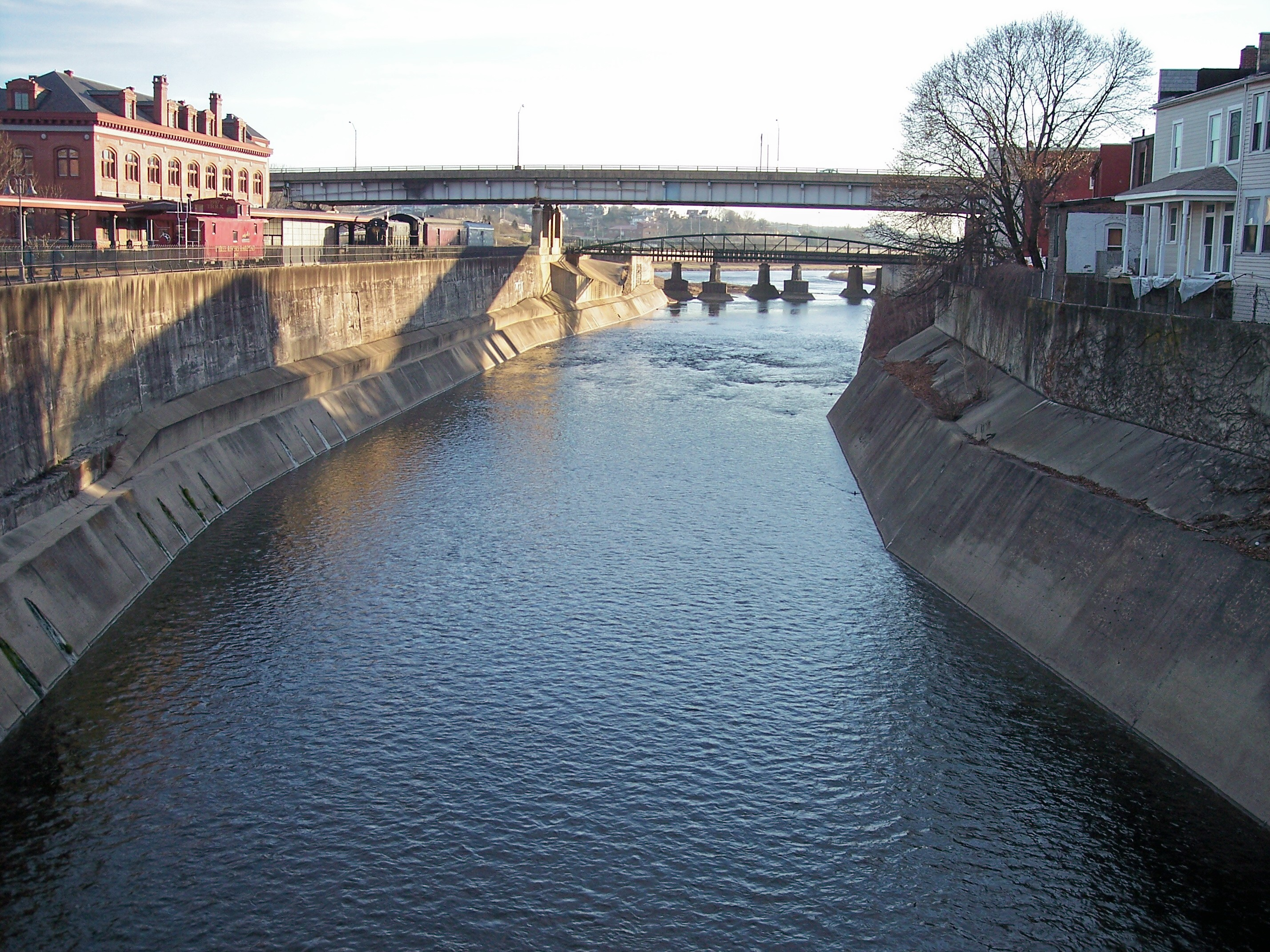
Wills Creek

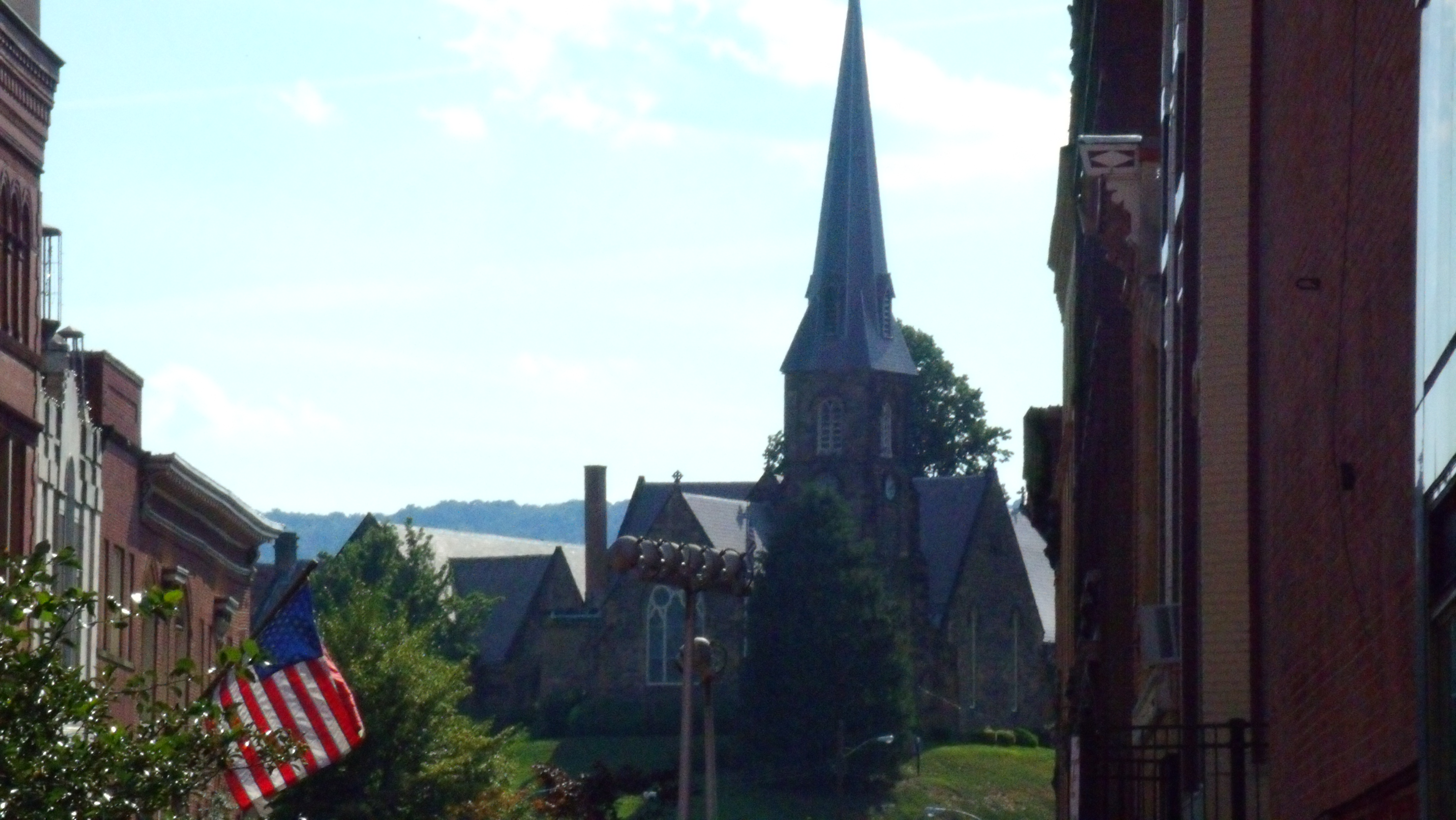
Downtown Cumberland

Some of Cumberland's most architecturally significant homes are located in the Washington Street Historic District. Considered the elite residential area when the city was at its economic peak, Washington Street was home to the region's leading citizens including the president of the C&O Canal. Significant public buildings include the Allegany County Courthouse, Allegany County Library, and Emmanuel Episcopal Church, located on the site of Fort Cumberland. It features Gothic Revival architecture with three large Tiffany windows, fort tunnels, and ammunition magazine cellars.

The 1850 Emmanuel Episcopal Church, standing at the eastern end of the Washington Street Historic District, is one of Maryland's most outstanding examples of early Gothic Revival architecture. The Allegany County Courthouse dominates the city's skyline. It was designed in 1893 by local architect Wright Butler. The Queen City Hotel was built by the B&O during the 1870s. The battle to preserve it was lost when the building was demolished in 1972. Temple B'er Chayim's 1865 Gothic Revival building is one of the oldest surviving synagogue buildings in the United States.

Also of note are the Western Maryland Scenic Railroad, the Chesapeake and Ohio Canal National Historical Park Terminus at Canal Place, the Chesapeake and Ohio Canal National Historical Park, the Allegheny Highlands Trail of Maryland, the Cumberland Masonic Temple, the Allegany Arts Council, Rocky Gap State Park, Cumberland Narrows along Wills Creek, on Alternate U.S. 40.

== Government ==
Cumberland's has Council–manager government composed of an elected mayor, four elected city council members, and an appointed city administrator. Cumberland's mayor, as of 2025, is Ray Morriss, who was elected in 2018 after defeating two-term incumbent Brian Grim. The city council members are Eugene T. Frazier, Richard J. "Rock" Cioni, Brian R.Lepley, and James Furstenberg, since 2018. The city council holds public meetings twice per month.

In fiscal year 2021, the city government recognized $46.4 million in revenue, and it incurred $42.2 million of expenses. During that period, the city government employed 234 people.

In the Maryland Senate, Cumberland is represented by Republican Mike McKay of District 1. In the Maryland House of Delegates, the entirety of the city of Cumberland, plus much of northwestern Allegany County, is represented by Republican and House Minority Leader Jason Buckel of District 1B.

Cumberland is located in Maryland's 6th congressional district, and is represented in the House of Representatives by Democrat April McClain Delaney, and is represented by Maryland's two Senators, Democrats Chris Van Hollen and Angela Alsobrooks.

In 2025, the city began offering a relocation program that provides up to $20,000 to attract new residents, with $10,000 in cash and a matching $10,000 for home renovations or down payments.

== Education ==
In 1864 the state legislature provided funds, and a structure for obtaining local funds from taxes and private donations for the purpose of funding schools for Negroes. The first public school for African-Americans in Cumberland operated in a colored YMCA on Independence Street, and was named the Mary Hoye school. In 1923 a new school for blacks was built on Frederick Street. In 1941 an election was held of students and faculty, and the school was renamed George Washington Carver School. In addition to serving the local population, many black people from surrounding areas in West Virginia sent their children to Carver because of the inadequate local facilities. The schools were integrated in 1955, when 54 African American children attended the white schools. In 1956, 3 black students became the first to graduate from Allegany County's newly integrated schools.

The offices of Allegany County Public Schools are located in Cumberland. Two public high schools serving grades 9-12 are located in the city: Allegany High School, located on Seton Drive atop Haystack Mountain, and Fort Hill High School, located on Greenway Avenue in the eastern part of the city. These schools are fed into by two middle schools, serving grades 6-8, also located in the city. Due to zoning, students attending Braddock Middle School, located on Holland Street on the city's North End, will generally attend Allegany, while students attending Washington Middle School, located on Massachusetts Avenue in the southeastern corner of the city, will generally attend Fort Hill. Public elementary schools serving students from pre-kindergarten through 5th grade located in the city of Cumberland include John Humbird Elementary, South Penn Elementary, and West Side Elementary. Some students residing in the North End of Cumberland may attend Northeast Elementary School, which sits just outside city limits in the neighborhood of Bowmans Addition.

Cumberland is home to two parochial schools. Bishop Walsh School is a K-12 Catholic school, located atop Haystack Mountain. The school is under the jurisdiction of the Archdiocese of Baltimore, and is partially run by the School Sisters of Notre Dame. Lighthouse Christian Academy is a K-12 Christian school, co-located with the Central Assembly of God church on Bedford Street on the north edge of the city's limits.

Approximately 39,000 people hold library cards in Allegany County, with libraries such as Washington Street Library and Lavale Public Library and several others.

== Media ==
Cumberland has several media outlets; most carry some form of satellite programming. WCBC-AM and WFRB-FM have some local news content, but do not have reporters collecting it. The closest public radio station is WFWM, at Frostburg, Maryland. Allegany Magazine is a recent media addition. The Cumberland Times-News is the area's daily newspaper.

== Infrastructure ==
=== Utilities ===
Water and sewer service is supplied by the City of Cumberland. The municipal watershed is located to the north within the Commonwealth of Pennsylvania. Water is drawn from two lakes on city land, Gordon and Koon. Electricity service is supplied by the Potomac Edison Company, which is a unit of FirstEnergy, while natural gas service is supplied by Columbia Gas of Maryland. There was once a working oil well that pumped crude oil from a location near the Fruit Bowl in the Cumberland Narrows. Hospitals include UPMC Western Maryland and Thomas B. Finan Center.

=== Transportation ===
==== Aviation ====
The Greater Cumberland Regional Airport (Airport-ID: CBE) provides local air transportation to the Cumberland area, located in Wiley Ford, West Virginia, to the south of the Potomac River. Mexico Farms Airport (Airport-ID: 1W3) is also in Cumberland.

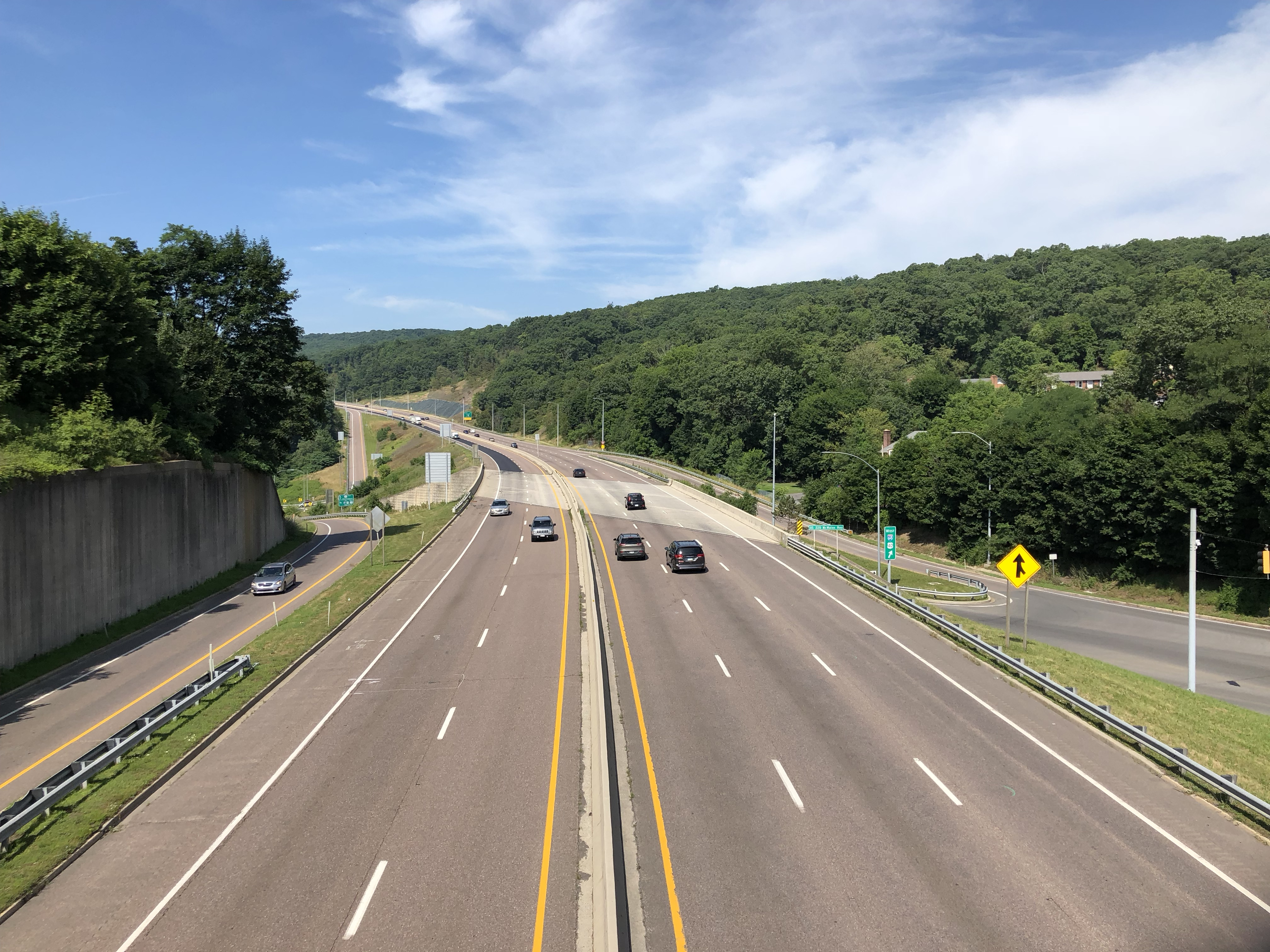
I-68/US 40 at its southwestern junction with US 220 in Cumberland

==== Roads and highways ====
Several primary highways serve Cumberland. The most prominent of these is Interstate 68, which runs concurrent with U.S. Route 40 through the city. I-68 and US 40 head eastward to Hancock, where they junction with Interstate 70 and U.S. Route 522. To the west, I-68 and US 40 separate in Keysers Ridge, with I-68 continuing west to Morgantown, West Virginia and a junction with Interstate 79. US 40 heads northwestward into southern Pennsylvania.

U.S. Route 220 also passes through Cumberland, mostly concurrent with I-68 and US 40. However, near the city limits on either end of its route through the city, US 220 diverges north and south from I-68 and US 40. To the north, US 220 heads for Bedford, Pennsylvania, while southwards, it reaches Keyser.

Other significant roads serving Cumberland include U.S. Route 40 Alternate, Maryland Route 51, Maryland Route 61, Maryland Route 639 and Maryland Route 807.

==== Public transportation ====
Amtrak, the national passenger rail system, provides intercity service to Cumberland via the Floridian, which runs between Miami, Florida, and Chicago Union Station. The Cumberland Amtrak station is located downtown at Queen City Drive and East Harrison Street. BayRunner Shuttle operates intercity service to Baltimore.

The primary local public transportation in the City of Cumberland is bus service provided by Allegany County Transit. This service consists of five scheduled routes that reach most areas of the city and provide access to most public facilities.

Potomac Valley Transit bus routes 105 and 205 serve the city. 105 serves Country Club Mall. 205 serves Roses Department Store.

The Western Maryland Scenic Railroad operates steam and diesel excursion trains from the town to Frostburg and back.

== In popular culture ==
The webcomic The Adventures of Dr. McNinja by Christopher Hastings is set in part in a fictionalized version of Cumberland.

Cumberland is briefly mentioned in the novel Blood Meridian by Cormac McCarthy.

== Sister cities ==
- Tapa, Lääne-Viru County, Estonia
- Viljandi, Estonia

== See also ==
- Federal Correctional Institution, Cumberland
