= Toll house (disambiguation) =

A toll house is a building or facility where a toll is collected on a toll road, canal, or bridge.

Toll house or tollhouse may also refer to:

== Individual toll houses ==
- The Round House, Stanton Drew, Somerset, UK
- La Vale Tollgate House, Maryland, US
- Petersburg Tollhouse, Addison, Pennsylvania, US
- Searights Tollhouse, National Road, near Uniontown, Pennsylvania, US
- Toll House (Burke, Vermont), toll house for the Burke Mountain Road, Vermont, US

== Other places ==
- Tollhouse, California, town in the western Sierra Nevada of California, US
- Toll House Inn, restaurant in Whitman, Massachusetts, US, where the chocolate chip cookie is claimed to have been invented
- Tollhouse Road, part of which shares California State Route 168, US

== Other uses ==
- Aerial toll house, a controversial belief in Eastern Orthodoxy
- Toll House cookies, brand of chocolate-chip cookie, named for the Inn

== See also ==
- Tollbooth (disambiguation)
