= Roundhouse =

Roundhouse may refer to:

== Building types ==
- Roundhouse (dwelling), a house with circular walls
  - Atlantic roundhouse, a type of Iron Age stone building in Scotland
- Roundhouse (windmill), the substructure of a windmill
- Railway roundhouse, a circular shed for locomotives
- Roundhouse, or gin gang, an extension to a threshing barn

== Specific structures ==
=== Australia ===
- Round House (Western Australia), an historic structure originally used as a jail in Fremantle, Western Australia
- Broadmeadow roundhouse, a former railway roundhouse in Broadmeadow, New South Wales
- Goulburn roundhouse, a former railway roundhouse in Goulburn, New South Wales
- Henty House, also called the Round House, a heritage-listed house in Melbourne, Victoria
- Valley Heights roundhouse, a former railway roundhouse in Valley Heights, New South Wales
- The Roundhouse, an entertainment venue at the University of New South Wales in Sydney, New South Wales

=== United Kingdom ===
- Roundhouse (venue), a UK live music venue and former railway roundhouse in Chalk Farm, London
- Horton Rounds, a Grade II listed house in Northamptonshire, England, sometimes referred to as the Round House
- St Giles's Roundhouse, a prison in London, England
- That Roundhouse, a private eco-dwelling within the Pembrokeshire Coast National Park in Wales
- The Round House (Havering), a Georgian villa in outer London
- The Round House, Stanton Drew, a former toll house in Somerset
- Round House (London Zoo), a 1933 gorilla house in the Modernist style

=== United States ===
- Round House (Barnstable, Massachusetts), 1930, a three-story wood frame round house
- Round House (Connecticut), a rotating residence designed by Richard Foster
- Round House (Somerville, Massachusetts)
- Roundhouse Railroad Museum, now the Georgia State Railroad Museum, in Savannah, Georgia
- Round House (Los Angeles) or Garden of Paradise, an 1847 adobe landmark
- Charles Koch Arena, Wichita, Kansas, nicknamed the Roundhouse
- McKenzie Arena, Chattanooga, Tennessee, nicknamed the Roundhouse
- The New Mexico State Capitol, Santa Fe, commonly known as the Roundhouse
- The former Philadelphia Police Department headquarters, Pennsylvania, known as the Roundhouse

=== Elsewhere ===
- Esquimalt and Nanaimo Railway Roundhouse, Canada
- The Round Houses in Moscow, Russia
- Round House (Nunspeet, Netherlands)

== Arts and entertainment ==
- Roundhouse (album), 1990, by Tar
- Roundhouse (periodical), an Australian rail transport magazine
- Roundhouse (TV series), a Nickelodeon 1990s variety show
- Round House Theatre, a non-profit theater production company in Maryland
- The Round House (novel), 2011, by Louise Erdrich
- Roundhouse Recording Studios, in London

== Other uses ==
- Round House, an alternate term for a United States Armed Forces DEFCON 3 alert
- Roundhouse punch, in boxing
- Roundhouse Hotel (public services), an addiction services facility in Boston, Massachusetts

== See also ==
- African round hut
