= Wable-Augustine Tavern =

- U.S. National Register of Historic Places
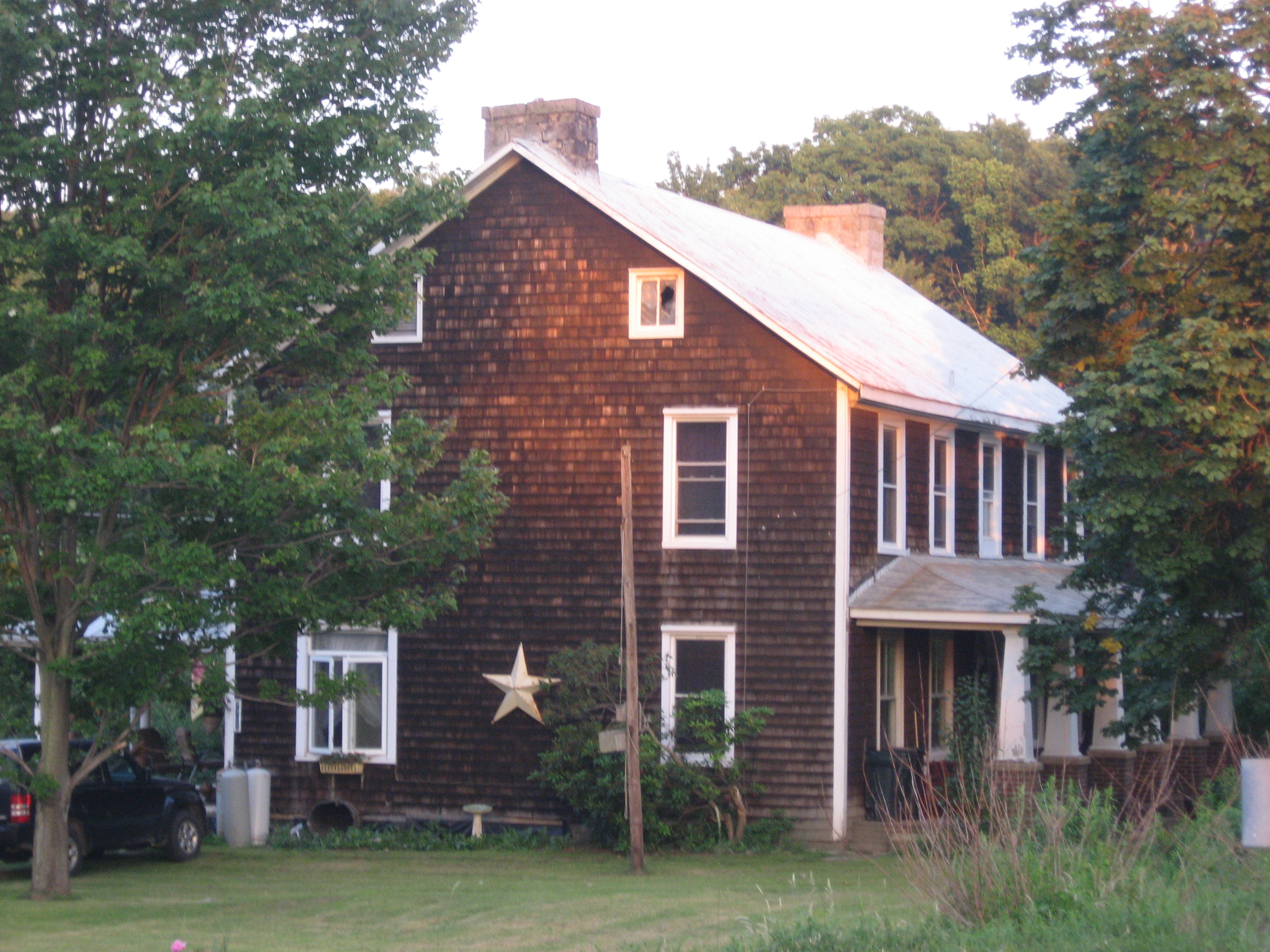
- View from the north

- Location within Pennsylvania Location within the United States
- Location: U.S. Route 40, approximately 1 mile (1.6 km) east of Addison, near Addison, Pennsylvania
- Coordinates: 39°44′3″N 79°19′10″W
- Area: less than one acre
- Built: c. 1820
- Architectural style: Federal
- MPS: National Road in Pennsylvania MPS
- NRHP reference No.: 95001353
- Added to NRHP: November 27, 1995

The Wable-Augustine Tavern is an historic inn and tavern that is located near Addison in Addison Township in Somerset County, Pennsylvania, United States.

It was listed on the National Register of Historic Places in 1995.

== History and architectural features ==
Built circa 1820, this historic structure is a two-and-one-half-story, five-bay, Federal-period, frame building. It sits on a rubblestone foundation and features interior stone gable end chimneys. The house operated as an inn and tavern during the National Road boom period, from the 1820s to the 1850s.
