= Old National Pike Milestones =

- U.S. National Register of Historic Places
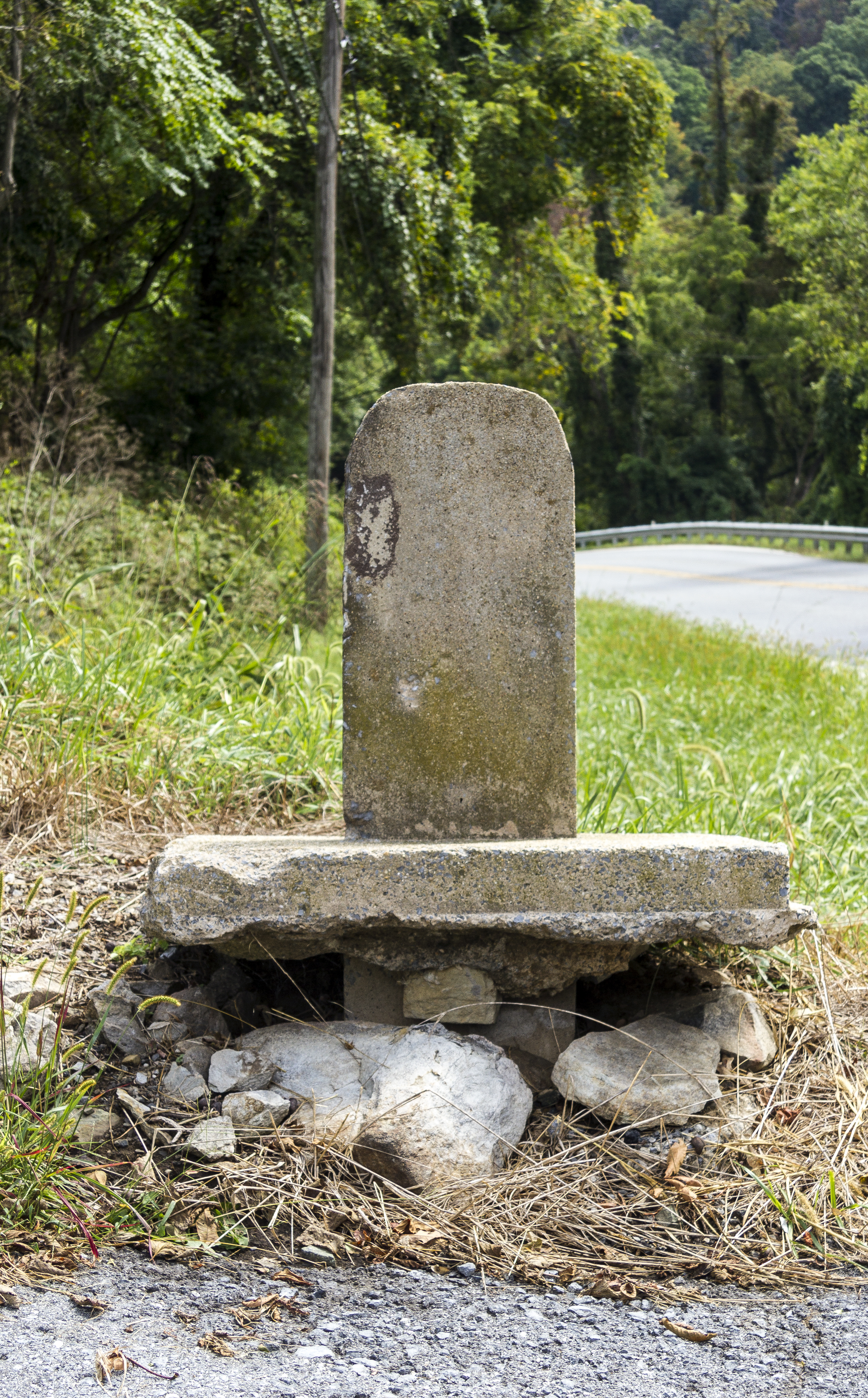
- Old National Pike Milestone at Dahlgren Road, September 2012

- Location within Maryland Location within the United States
- Location: MD 44 and MD 165, US 40, US 40 Alt, and US 40 Scenic, near Baltimore, Maryland
- Coordinates: 39°25′13″N 77°16′1″W
- Area: 0.1 acres (0.040 ha)
- Built: 1806
- NRHP reference No.: 75002107
- Added to NRHP: November 27, 1975

The Old National Pike Milestones marked each mile of the old National Road in Maryland, an eastern coastal state of the United States, from its dominating city of Baltimore to major towns of western Maryland, as Frederick, and between it and Hagerstown, to Hancock, through to Cumberland in the western panhandle of the state in the foothills of the Appalachian Mountains. The surviving stones have been included in the National Register of Historic Places, maintained by the National Park Service of the U.S. Department of the Interior, and may be seen along the route variously designated as U.S. Route 40, Maryland Route 144, Alternate U.S. Route 40, and several other roads that trace the path of the original Old National Pike.

From Baltimore to Cumberland, the road was surveyed and laid out with construction in several phases over different periods of time by several turnpike companies, chartered by the General Assembly of Maryland beginning in 1808. Earlier in 1806, the United States Congress with the approval of third President Thomas Jefferson, authorized the surveying and further construction of a national road to continue on from Cumberland on the upstream of the Potomac River further to the west across additional mountainous ranges in the Allegheny Mountains to the newly admitted State of Ohio (admitted 1803 as the seventeenth state). Later the congressional action was amended to direct the road to the state boundaries on the Ohio River and it eventually landed at Wheeling, West Virginia. In later decades, the road was extended west across Ohio, Indiana and into the Illinois Country, to eventually terminate by the 1840s in Vandalia, the territorial capital of Illinois, just east of the Mississippi River, and northeast of the newly emergent, frontier river port metropolis of St. Louis of the Missouri Territory and the former Louisiana Purchase of 1803 to the west.

The Old Pike milestones in Maryland are about 30 inches tall, twelve inches wide and eight inches deep, with rounded tops and the inscription XX miles to B, referring to the distance to Baltimore, the road's terminus. The composition of the stones varies, with the first 39 milestones of Baltimore gneiss from the area of Ellicott City. Stones from Frederick to Boonsboro are quartzite from the area of the Monocacy River. A unique white limestone with a distinctive inscription was employed from Boonsboro to Hagerstown, while west of Hagerstown the stones are gray limestone.

Sixty-nine stones still remained on the Old National Pike at the time the stones were nominated to the National Register.
