= Tollbooth (disambiguation) =

A tollbooth is a place where tolls for road usage are collected on toll roads.

Tollbooth may also refer to:

== Places ==
- Tollbooth Gallery, Tacoma, Washington, United States

== Films ==
- Tollbooth (film), a 1994 film directed by Salomé Breziner
- The Tollbooth, a 2004 coming-of-age film
- Toll Booth (film), a 2010 Turkish drama film

== Other uses ==
- Tollbooth (G.I. Joe), a fictional character in the G.I. Joe universe

== See also ==
- Tolbooth (disambiguation)
- Phantom Tollbooth (disambiguation)
- Toll house (disambiguation)
- Toll station (disambiguation)
- Toll houses of the United Kingdom
  - Tollgate metro station
