= Tolbooth (disambiguation) =

A tolbooth is a traditional Scottish 'town hall' for the administration of burghs, usually providing a council meeting chamber, a court house and a jail.

Tolbooth may also refer to:

- Tholsel, an ancient term for a town administrative house and gated toll house in Ireland. Similar to the English term tolsey
- Stonehaven Tolbooth, a museum and restaurant in Stonehaven, Scotland

== See also ==
- Tollbooth (disambiguation)
