= Addison Township, Pennsylvania =

Township in Pennsylvania, US

- Township
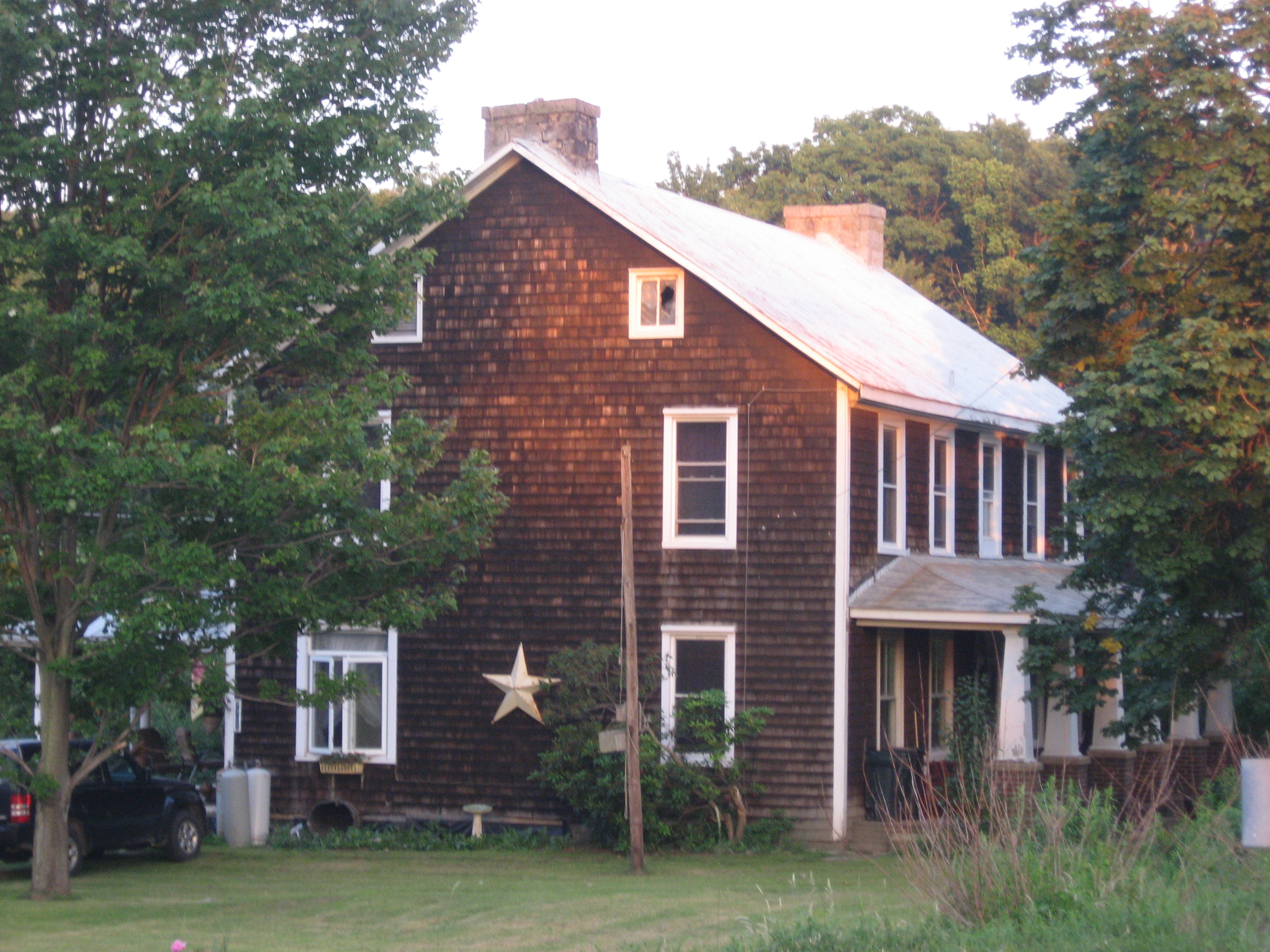
- The Wable-Augustine Tavern, a historic site in the township

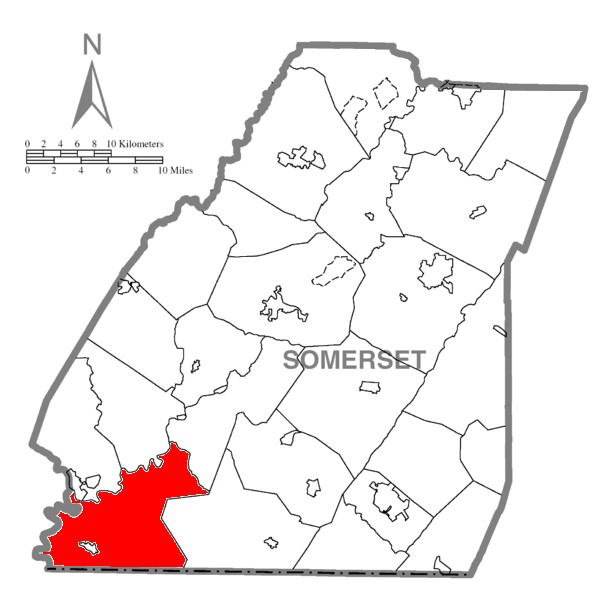
- Map of Somerset County, Pennsylvania Highlighting Addison Township

- Map of Somerset County, Pennsylvania
- Country: United States
- State: Pennsylvania
- County: Somerset
- Settled: 1764
- Incorporated: 1800

Area
  - Total: 63.20 sq mi (163.69 km^{2})
  - Land: 61.39 sq mi (159.01 km^{2})
  - Water: 1.80 sq mi (4.67 km^{2})

Population (2020)
  - Total: 932 ▼
  - Estimate (2022): 932
  - Density: 15.3/sq mi (5.89/km^{2})
- Time zone: UTC-5 (Eastern (EST))
  - Summer (DST): UTC-4 (EDT)
- FIPS code: 42-111-00404

Addison Township is a township in Somerset County, Pennsylvania, United States. The population was 932 at the 2020 census. It is part of the Johnstown, Pennsylvania, Metropolitan Statistical Area. The township is named for Alexander Addison, the first president judge (the chief judge within a U.S. judicial district) overseeing Somerset County.

== History ==
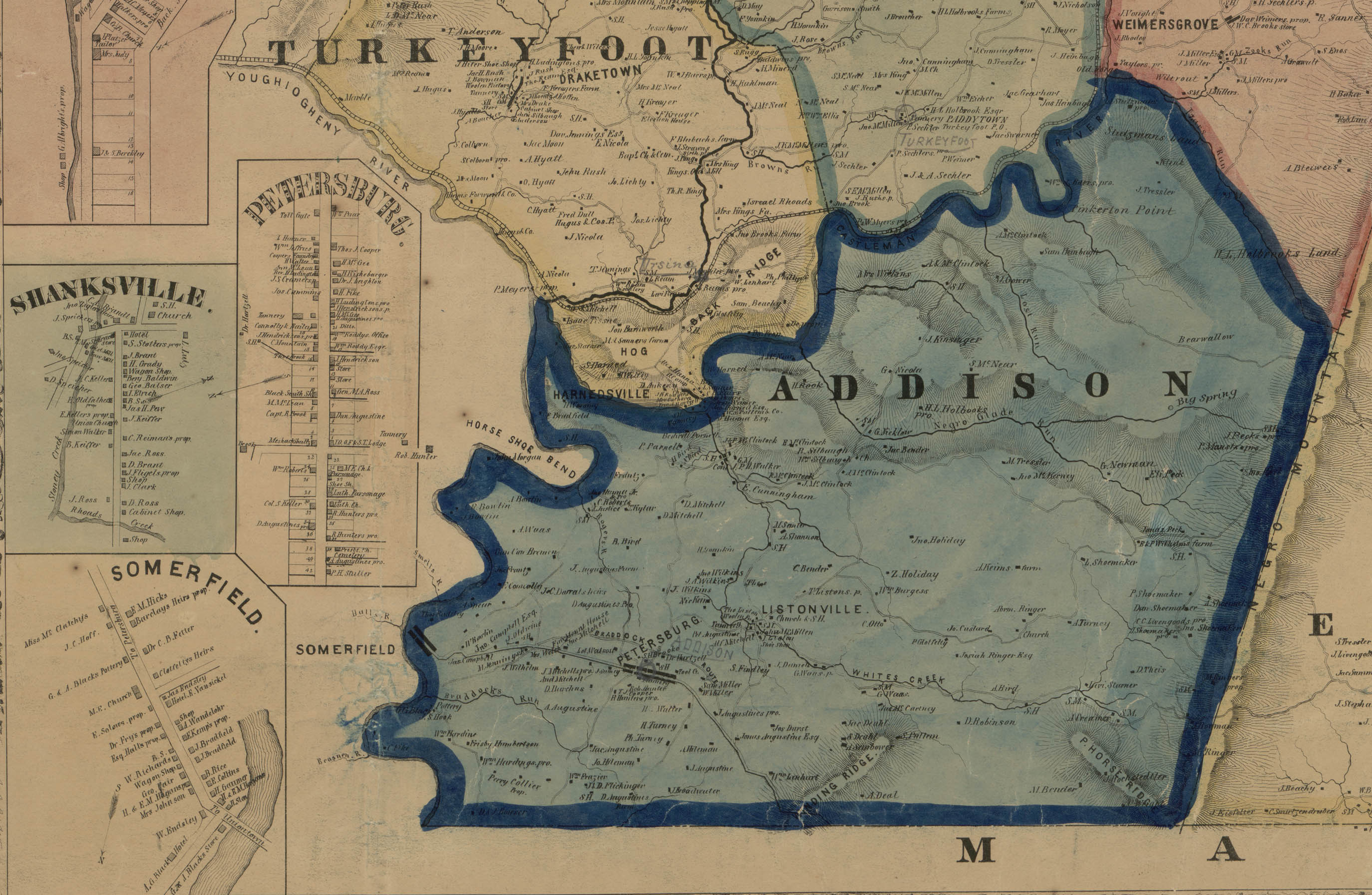
Addison Township, Somerset County, Pennsylvania, 1860

Major General Edward Braddock's Expedition of 1755 passed through the southwestern portion of the area that became Addison Township. The township was organized in 1800. Somerfield was laid out on the western edge of the township about 1816 by Philip D. Smyth, but the town was abandoned and covered over by the Youghiogheny River Lake in the 1940s. The Wable-Augustine Tavern was added to the National Register of Historic Places in 1995.

== Geography ==
According to the United States Census Bureau, the township has a total area of 63.4 square miles (164 km^{2}), of which 61.7 square miles (160 km^{2}) is land and 1.7 square miles (4.4 km^{2}) (2.74%) is water. It surrounds the borough of Addison, which is located in the southwestern section of the township. Addison Township is bordered by Elk Lick Township to the east, Black Township to the northeast, Upper Turkeyfoot and Lower Turkeyfoot Townships to the northwest, the Youghiogheny River Lake to the west, and Maryland to the south. U.S. Route 40 passes through the southwestern corner of Addison Township, crossing over the Youghiogheny River Lake from Fayette County in the west, passing through the borough of Addison, and continuing south into Maryland.

== Demographics ==
Historical population
Census	Pop.	Note	%±
2000	1,019		—
2010	974		−4.4%
2020	932		−4.3%
2022 (est.)	925		−0.8%
U.S. Decennial Census

At the 2000 census there were 1,019 people, 435 households, and 301 families living in the township. The population density was 16.5 people per square mile (6.4/km^{2}). There were 964 housing units at an average density of 15.6/sq mi (6.0/km^{2}). The racial makeup of the township was 99.71% White, 0.10% Native American, 0.10% Asian, 0.10% from other races. Hispanic or Latino of any race were 0.20%.

Of the 435 households 23.7% had children under the age of 18 living with them, 59.3% were married couples living together, 6.0% had a female householder with no husband present, and 30.6% were non-families. 27.4% of households were one person and 14.7% were one person aged 65 or older. The average household size was 2.33 and the average family size was 2.78.

The age distribution was 19.9% under the age of 18, 5.7% from 18 to 24, 23.9% from 25 to 44, 28.7% from 45 to 64, and 21.8% 65 or older. The median age was 45 years. For every 100 females there were 105.9 males.

For every 100 females age 18 and over, there were 106.6 males.

The median household income was $29,792, and the median family income was $33,654. Males had a median income of $28,750 versus $19,688 for females. The per capita income for the township was $16,889.

About 11.1% of families and 14.3% of the population were below the poverty line, including 13.5% of those under age 18 and 18.8% of those age 65 or over.
