= Toll station =

A toll station may refer to:

- A toll house or toll booth on a turnpike or toll highway
- In historical landline telephony, a non-dialable toll point as a manual telephone in an isolated rural location with no local exchange or local calling area

== See also ==
- Tollbooth (disambiguation)
