= Lafayette, Madison County, Ohio =

Lafayette, Ohio
- Census-designated place
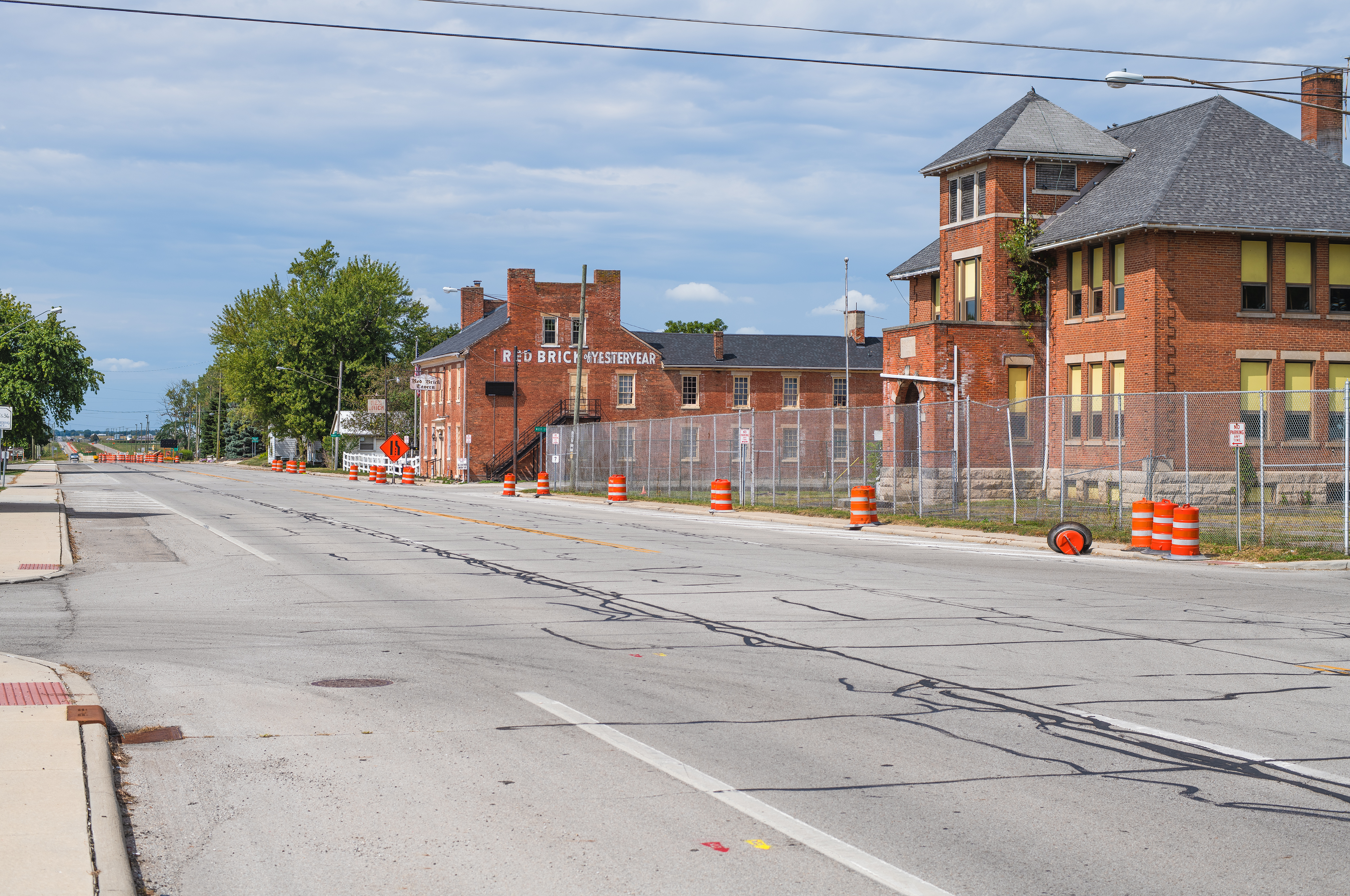
- Looking westbound on U.S. Route 40 in Lafayette

- Location within Ohio Location within the United States
- Coordinates: 39°56′27″N 83°24′20″W
- Country: United States
- State: Ohio
- County: Madison
- Township: Deer Creek

Area
  - Total: 1.05 sq mi (2.7 km^{2})
  - Land: 1.05 sq mi (2.7 km^{2})
  - Water: 0.0 sq mi (0 km^{2})
- Elevation: 1,014 ft (309 m)

Population (2020)
  - Total: 206
  - Density: 196/sq mi (75.7/km^{2})
- Time zone: UTC-5 (Eastern (EST))
  - Summer (DST): UTC-4 (EDT)
- ZIP code: 43140 (London)
- Area code: 740
- GNIS feature ID: 2628913
- FIPS code: 39-41146

Lafayette is an unincorporated community and census-designated place in the center of Deer Creek Township, Madison County, Ohio, United States. It is located along U.S. Route 40, just west of its intersection with U.S. Route 42. The population of Lafayette was 206 at the 2020 census.

== History ==
=== Lawrenceville ===
Lawrenceville (also known regionally as "Limerick") was laid out in 1816 by Thomas Gwynne, on land he owned 1.5 miles (2.4 km) northwest of where Lafayette is located today. In 1816, Angus Ross opened Lawrenceville's first and only tavern. The Lawrenceville post office was established on July 2, 1825. In 1836-7, the National Road was completed through the township, missing Lawrenceville, and the town immediately began to die. By 1915, the original community was nothing more than pasture land, with no signs left to indicate there was ever a community.

=== Lafayette ===
Lafayette was laid out on October 1, 1834, by William Minter, and named in honor of Gilbert du Motier, Marquis de Lafayette. On December 31, 1836, the Lawrenceville post office was moved to Lafayette and took the new settlement's name, with John Minter as the first postmaster. As of 1875, the community contained one drug store, one dry goods and grocery store, and one blacksmith shop. The post office was discontinued on December 31, 1905, with mail service going through the London branch. As of 1915, the community contained three general stores and one blacksmith shop.

Lafayette is home to the Red Brick Tavern, one of 11 properties on the National Register of Historic Places listings in Madison County, Ohio.

== Geography ==
Lafayette is in central Madison County, 4 miles (6 km) northeast of London, the county seat, and 21 miles (34 km) west of the center of Columbus, the state capital. U.S. Route 40, the former National Road, runs through the center of Lafayette, leading east to Columbus and west the same distance to Springfield. U.S. Route 42 runs along the southeast edge of Lafayette, leading southwest to London and northeast 14 miles (23 km) to Plain City.

According to the U.S. Census Bureau, the Lafayette CDP has an area of 1.05 square miles (2.72 km^{2}), all land. Deer Creek, a southeast-flowing tributary of the Scioto River, runs along the western edge of the community.

== Demographics ==
Historical population
| Census | Pop. | Note | %± |
|---|---|---|---|
| 2010 | 202 | | — |
| 2020 | 206 | | 2.0% |

The population of Lafayette was 160 in 1875 and 75 in 1915. At the 2010 U.S. census it was 202.
