= Petersburg Tollhouse =

Historic tollhouse in Pennsylvania, United States

- U.S. National Register of Historic Places
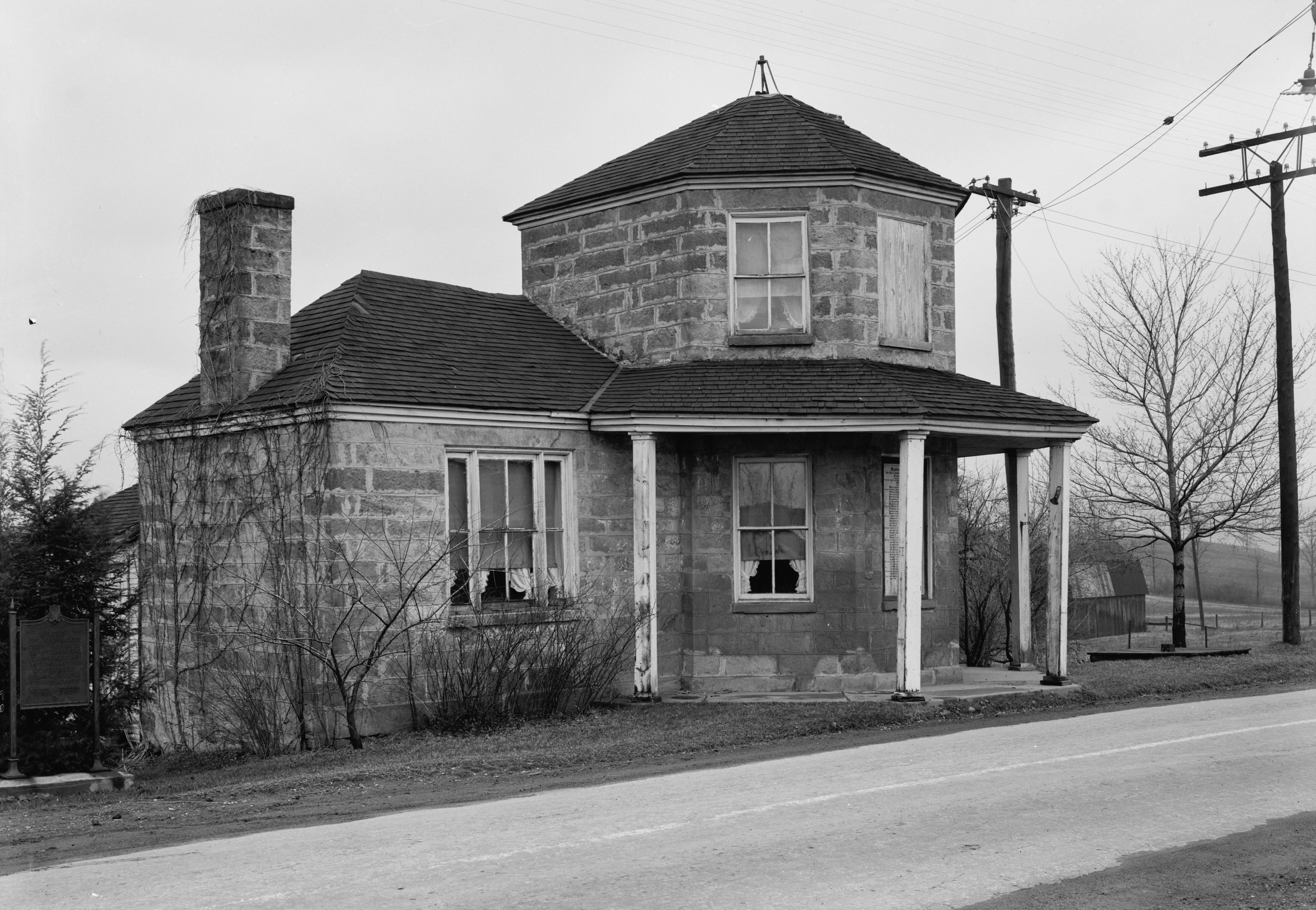
- The Tollhouse (side view), taken from across the National Road in 1933

- Location within Pennsylvania Location within the United States
- Location: Off U.S. 40, Addison, Pennsylvania
- Coordinates: 39°44′47″N 79°20′6″W
- Area: 0.1 acres (0.040 ha)
- Built: 1835
- NRHP reference No.: 79002346
- Added to NRHP: March 20, 1979

The Petersburg Tollhouse was the first tollhouse that travelers encountered while on the National Road heading west into Pennsylvania. The tollhouse is located in the village of Addison, Pennsylvania, United States. When it was constructed in 1835, Addison was then known as "Petersburg".

The tollhouse was listed on the National Register of Historic Places in 1979.

== History and notable features ==
The Old Route 40 now sits atop the National Pike at this tollhouse. The Petersburg tollhouse is one of three surviving tollhouses for the National Pike; the remaining ones are the LaVale tollhouse located between Cumberland and Frostburg, Maryland and the Searight's tollhouse located just west of Uniontown on Route 40. Though the Historic American Buildings Survey states the Tollhouse was built circa 1812–1814, the National Register of Historic Places nomination form states the Tollhouse was built circa 1835.

The toll house is owned by Great Crossings Chapter of the National Society Daughters of the American Revolution, and is open to visitors by appointment.

== See also ==
- National Register of Historic Places listings in Somerset County, Pennsylvania
