= Phantom Tollbooth (disambiguation) =

Phantom Tollbooth may refer to:

- The Phantom Tollbooth, a children's book written by Norton Juster
- The Phantom Tollbooth (film), a 1970 film adaptation of the novel
- Phantom Tollbooth (band), an American post-punk band

== See also ==
- Tollbooth (disambiguation)
