= National Road =

Early American highway

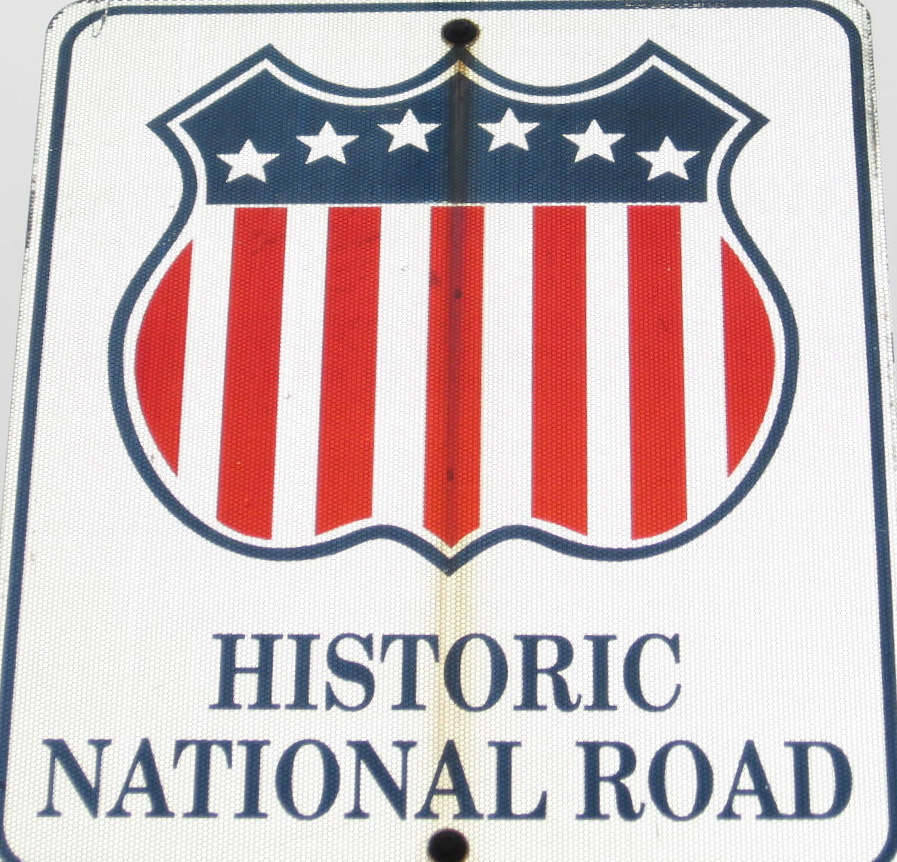
National Road

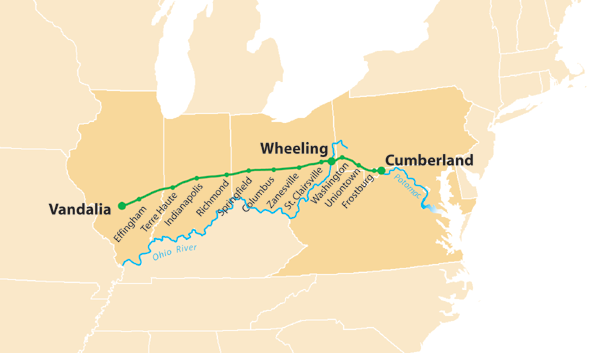

Route information
- Existed: 1811–present

Major junctions
- East end: Cumberland, Maryland
- West end: Vandalia, Illinois

Location
- Country: United States
- States: Maryland, Virginia, Ohio, Indiana, Illinois

Highway system
- Scenic Byways; National; National Forest; BLM; NPS

The National Road—formerly the Cumberland Road and later celebrated as "Main Street of America"—was the United States' first great federally financed highway and a proving ground for national‑scale internal improvements.

Originating at the head of navigation on the Potomac River in Cumberland, Maryland, the 4-rod (66 ft; 20 m) wide engineered turnpike was authorized on March 29, 1806, when President Thomas Jefferson signed "An Act to regulate the laying out and making a road from Cumberland … to the State of Ohio". Surveyors ran a 131-mile (211 km) alignment over the Allegheny Mountains to Wheeling, Virginia, on the Ohio River by 1818, building a stone‑surfaced, cambered roadway, masonry bridges, culverts, and cast‑iron mileposts that set standards for antebellum turnpikes.

Between 1825 and 1838, Congress approved successive appropriations that pushed the highway westward across Ohio, Indiana, and into Illinois. Construction gangs reached Zanesville in 1833, Columbus in 1834, the eastern outskirts of Indianapolis in 1836, Terre Haute in 1838, and the then‑capital of Vandalia, Illinois—591 mi (951 km) from Cumberland—by 1839, when federal contracts ceased.

From 1806 to 1838, Congress appropriated about $6.8 million for surveys, right‑of‑way acquisition, grading, stone surfacing, and masonry—an unprecedented federal outlay for transportation infrastructure. The project triggered widespread debates over the constitutional scope of "internal improvements".

The operation and maintenance of completed segments were transferred to the states in stages—Maryland (1833), Pennsylvania (1836), Virginia (now West Virginia) (1838), Ohio (1849), Indiana (1849), and Illinois (1856). Traffic declined with the rise of canals and railroads, but many portions were rebuilt in concrete or brick during the 1910s–1930s and incorporated into U.S. Route 40.

In the 20th century, with the advent of the automobile, the National Road was connected with other historic routes to California under the title, National Old Trails Road. Today, much of the alignment is followed by U.S. Route 40 (US 40), with various portions bearing the Alternate U.S. Route 40 (Alt. US 40) designation, or various state-road numbers (such as Maryland Route 144 for several sections between Baltimore and Cumberland). Scholars regard the National Road as a foundational step toward the modern Interstate Highway System. Today, Interstate 70 closely follows the National Road for most of its length.

In 1976, the American Society of Civil Engineers designated the National Road as a National Historic Civil Engineering Landmark. In 2002, the entire road, including extensions east to Baltimore and west to St. Louis, was designated the Historic National Road, an All-American Road. The surviving corridor, which includes historic tollhouses, stone‑arch and iron bridges, and intact macadam sections, is now listed on the National Register of Historic Places.

== History ==
=== Braddock Road ===
The Braddock Road had been opened by the Ohio Company in 1751 between Fort Cumberland, the limit of navigation on the upper Potomac River, and the French military station at Fort Duquesne at the forks of the Ohio River, (at the confluence of the Allegheny and Monongahela Rivers), an important trading and military point where the city of Pittsburgh now stands. It received its name during the colonial-era French and Indian War of 1753–1763 (also known as the Seven Years' War in Europe), when it was constructed by British General Edward Braddock, who was accompanied by Colonel George Washington of the Virginia militia regiment in the ill-fated July 1755 Braddock expedition, an attempt to assault the French-held Fort Duquesne.

=== Cumberland Road ===
Cumberland Road Act of 1806
- Other short titles: National Road Act
- Long title: An Act to regulate the laying out and making a road from Cumberland, in the state of Maryland, to the state of Ohio
- Nicknames: The National Road Bill
- Enacted by: the 9th United States Congress
- Effective: March 29, 1806

Citations
- Statutes at Large: 2 Stat. 357

Legislative history
- Introduced in the Senate by Uriah Tracy (F‑CT) on December 19, 1805; Committee consideration by Senate Committee on the Ohio Road Fund; Passed the Senate on December 27, 1805; Passed the House of Representatives on March 24, 1806 (66–38); Signed into law by President Thomas Jefferson on March 29, 1806

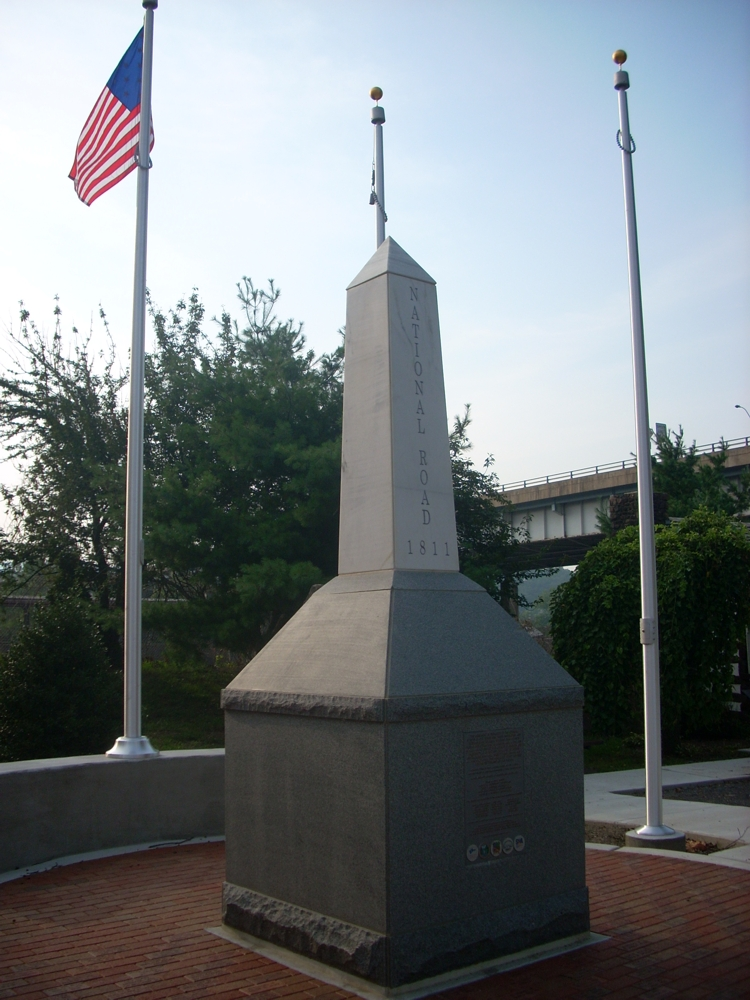
Marker at the start of the Cumberland National Road

Construction of the Cumberland Road (which later became part of the longer National Road) was authorized on March 29, 1806, by Congress. The new Cumberland Road would replace the wagon and foot paths of the Braddock Road for travel between the Potomac and Ohio Rivers, following roughly the same alignment until just east of Uniontown, Pennsylvania. From there, where the Braddock Road turned north towards Pittsburgh, the new National Road/Cumberland Road continued west to Wheeling, Virginia (now West Virginia), also on the Ohio River.

The contract for the construction of the first section was awarded to Henry McKinley on May 8, 1811, and construction began later that year, with the road reaching Wheeling on August 1, 1818. For more than 100 years, a simple granite stone was the only marker of the road's beginning in Cumberland, Maryland. In June 2012, a monument and plaza were built in that town's Riverside Park, next to the historic original starting point.

Beyond the National Road's eastern terminus at Cumberland and toward the Atlantic coast, a series of private toll roads and turnpikes were constructed, connecting the National Road (also known as the Old National Pike) with Baltimore, then the third-largest city in the country, and a major maritime port on Chesapeake Bay. Completed in 1824, these feeder routes formed what is referred to as an eastern extension of the federal National Road.

=== Westward extension ===
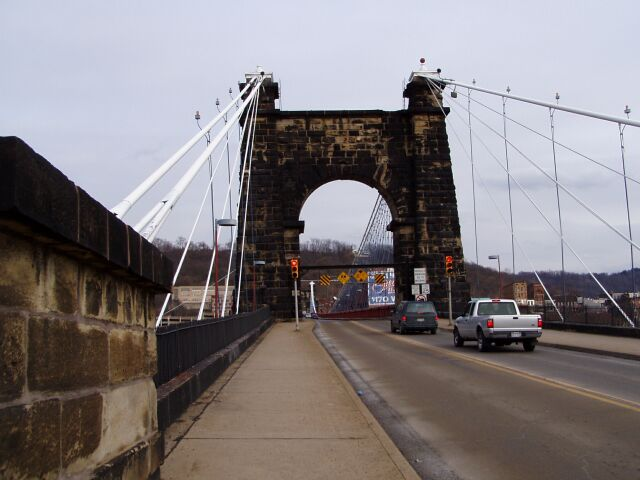
The Wheeling Suspension Bridge across the Ohio River was completed in 1849 and was still in use by local traffic until its closure on September 24, 2019. The bridge is now limited to pedestrians only.

On May 15, 1820, Congress authorized an extension of the road to St. Louis, on the Mississippi River, and on March 3, 1825, across the Mississippi and to Jefferson City, Missouri. Work on the extension between Wheeling and Zanesville, Ohio, used the pre-existing Zane's Trace of Ebenezer Zane, and was completed in 1833 to the new state capital of Columbus, Ohio, and in 1838 to the college town of Springfield, Ohio.

In 1849, a bridge was completed to carry the National Road across the Ohio River at Wheeling. The Wheeling Suspension Bridge, designed by Charles Ellet Jr., was at the time the world's longest bridge span at 1,010 feet (310 m) from tower to tower.

=== Transfer to states ===
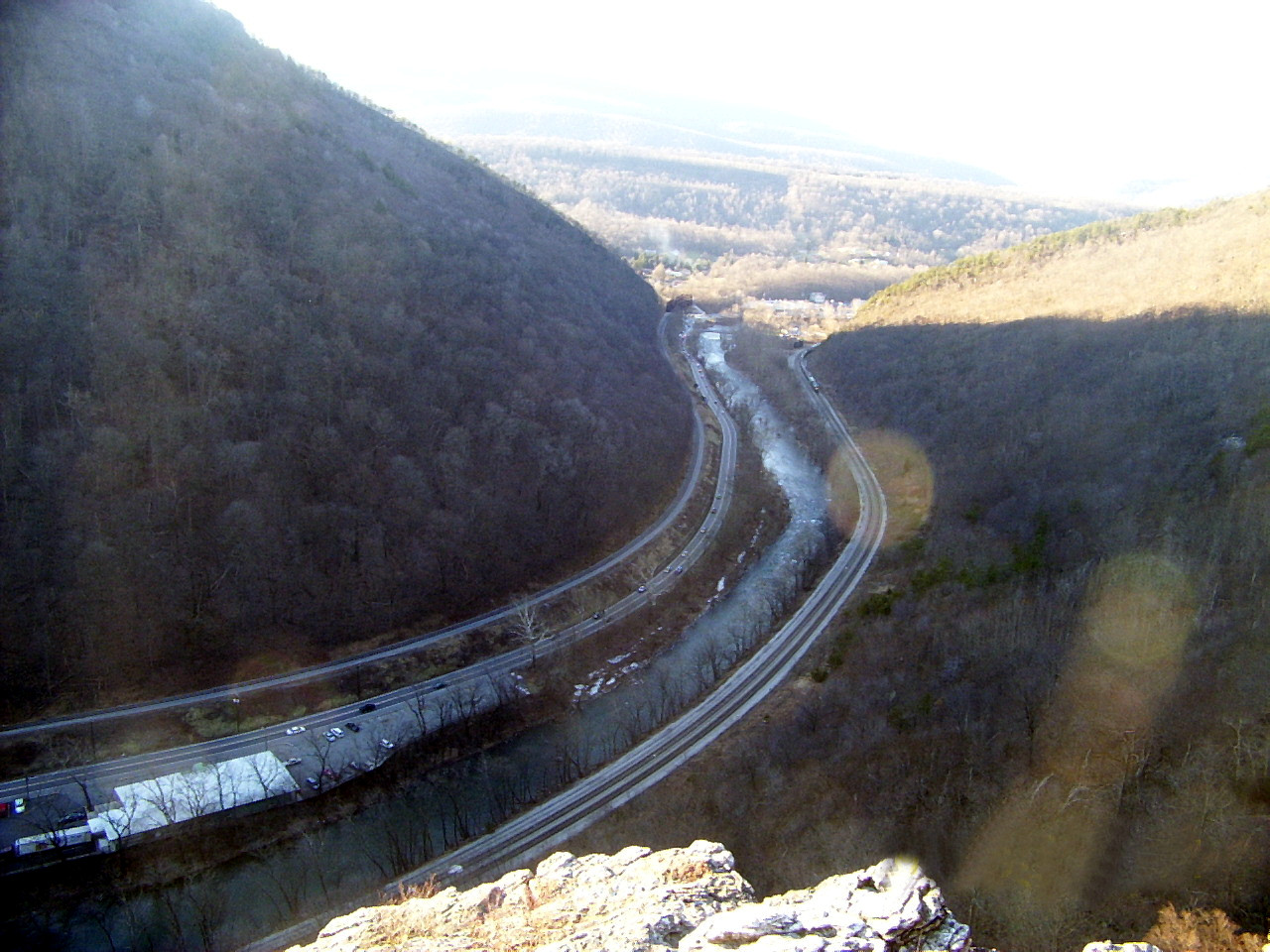
The Cumberland Narrows west of Cumberland, part of the realigned routing

Maintenance costs on the Cumberland Road were becoming more than Congress was willing to bear. In agreements with Maryland, Virginia, and Pennsylvania, the road was to be reconstructed and resurfaced. The section that ran over Haystack Mountain, just west of Cumberland, was abandoned and a new road was built through the Cumberland Narrows.

On April 1, 1835, the section from Wheeling to Cumberland was transferred to Maryland, Pennsylvania, and Virginia (now West Virginia). The last congressional appropriation was made May 25, 1838, and in 1840, Congress voted against completing the unfinished portion of the road, with the deciding vote being cast by Henry Clay. By that time, railroads were beginning to compete for long-distance transportation. The Baltimore and Ohio Railroad was being built west from Baltimore to Cumberland, mostly along the Potomac River, which was a more direct route than the National Road across the Allegheny Plateau of West Virginia (then Virginia) to Wheeling. Construction of the National Road stopped in 1839. Portions of the road through Indiana and Illinois remained unpaved or otherwise rudimentary and were transferred to the states.

Federal construction of the road stopped at Vandalia, Illinois, which at that time was the state's capital. Illinois officials decided not to continue construction without the federal funds because two state roads from Vandalia to the St. Louis area, today's US 40 and Illinois Route 140 (known then as the Alton Road), already existed.

=== Subsequent events ===
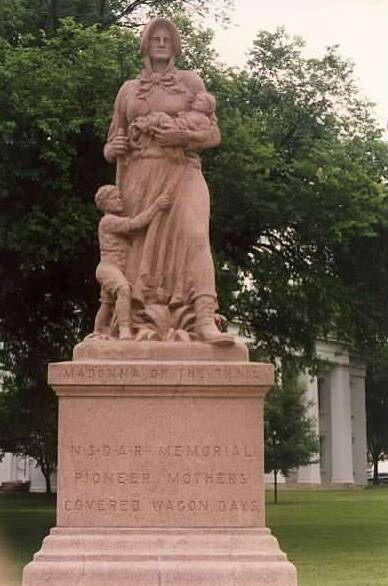
Madonna of the Trail monument along the Old National Road in Vandalia, Illinois

In 1912, the National Road was chosen to become part of the National Old Trails Road, which would extend further east to New York City and west to Los Angeles, California. Five Madonna of the Trail monuments, donated by the Daughters of the American Revolution, were erected along the National Road section; others were erected further west.

In 1927, the National Road was designated as the eastern part of US 40, which still generally follows the National Road's alignment with occasional bypasses, realignments, and newer bridges. The mostly parallel Interstate 70 (I-70) now provides a faster route for through travel without the many sharp curves, steep grades, and narrow bridges of US 40 and other segments of the National Road. Heading west from Hancock in western Maryland, I-70 takes a more northerly path to connect with and follow the Pennsylvania Turnpike (also designated as I-76) across the mountains between Breezewood and New Stanton, where I-70 turns west to rejoin the National Road's route (and US 40) near Washington, Pennsylvania.

The more recently constructed I-68 parallels the old road from Hancock through Cumberland west to Keyser's Ridge, Maryland, where the National Road and US 40 turn northwest into Pennsylvania, but I-68 continues directly west to meet I-79 near Morgantown, West Virginia. The portion of I-68 in Maryland is designated as the National Freeway.

=== Historical structures ===
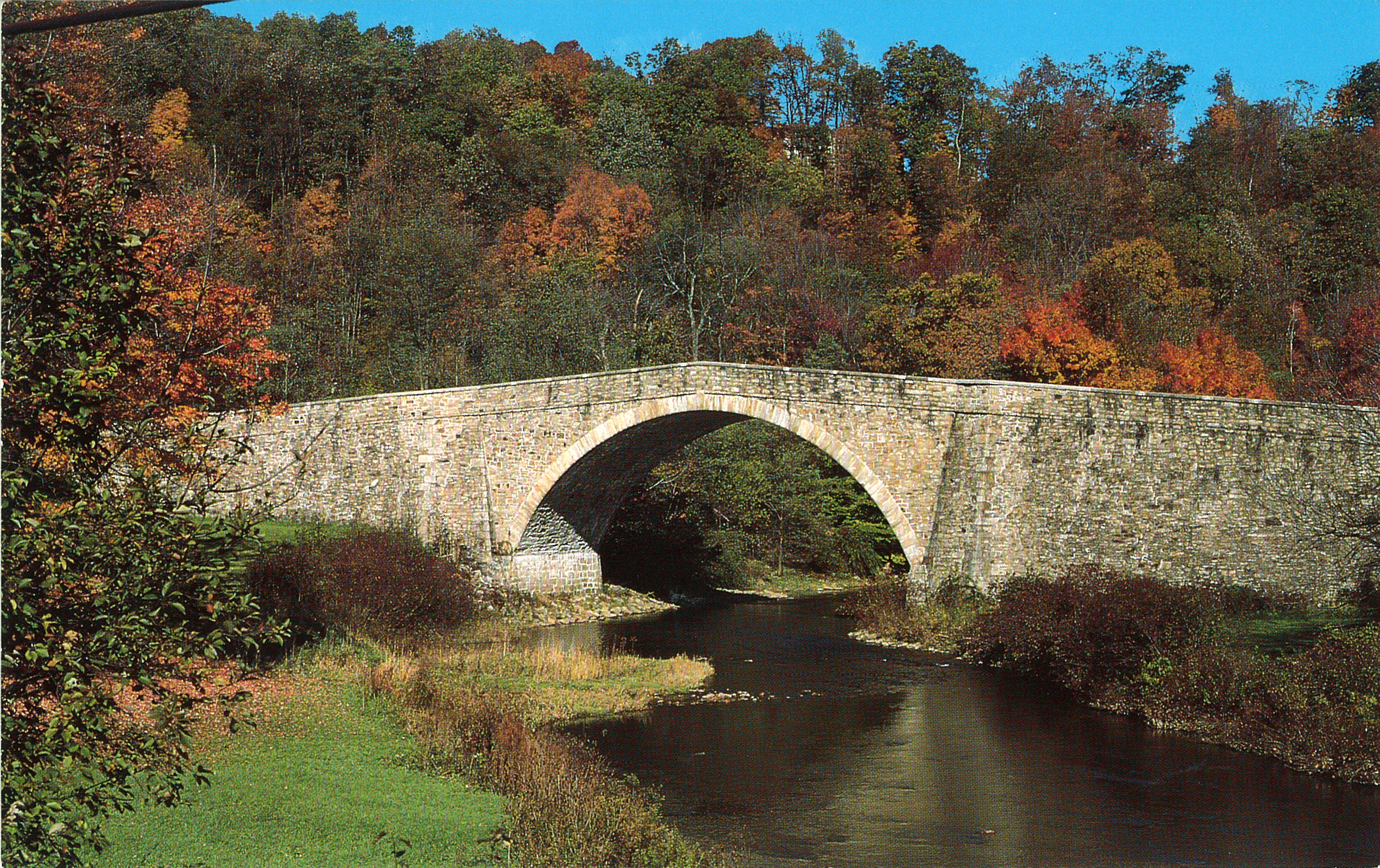
The Casselman River Bridge in western Maryland, completed in 1814

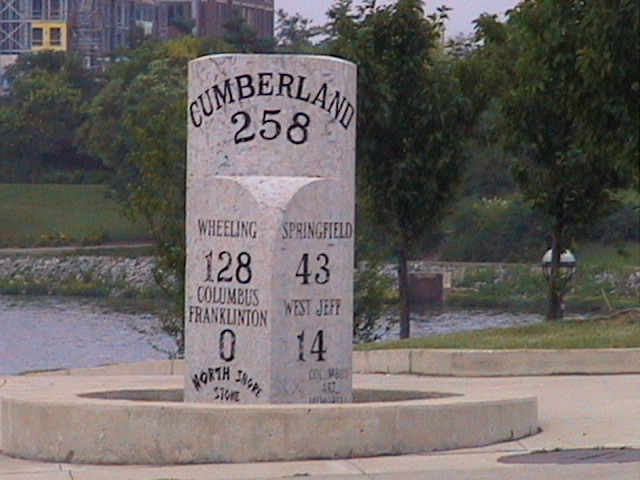
Mile marker along the National Road in Columbus, Ohio

Many of the National Road's original stone arch bridges also remain on former alignments, including:

- Casselman River Bridge near Grantsville, Maryland – Built in 1813–1814 to carry the road across the Casselman River, it was the longest single-span stone arch bridge in America at the time.
- Great Crossings Bridge near Confluence, Pennsylvania—built in 1818 to carry the road over the Youghiogheny River—the bridge, and the adjacent town of Somerfield, Pennsylvania (which was razed) are under the waters of Youghiogheny River Lake (though still visible at times of extremely low water levels).

Another remaining National Road bridge is the Wheeling Suspension Bridge at Wheeling, West Virginia. Opened in 1849 to carry the road over the Ohio River, it was the largest suspension bridge in the world until 1851, and until 2019 was the oldest vehicular suspension bridge in the United States still in use, although it has since been closed to vehicular traffic due to repeated overweight vehicles ignoring the weight limits and damaging the bridge. A newer bridge now carries the realigned US 40 and I-70 across the river nearby.

Three of the road's original toll houses are preserved:

- La Vale Tollgate House, in La Vale, Maryland
- Petersburg Tollhouse, in Addison, Pennsylvania
- Searights Tollhouse, near Uniontown, Pennsylvania

Additionally, several Old National Pike Milestones—some well-maintained, others deteriorating, and yet others represented by modern replacements—remain intact along the route.

== Route description ==
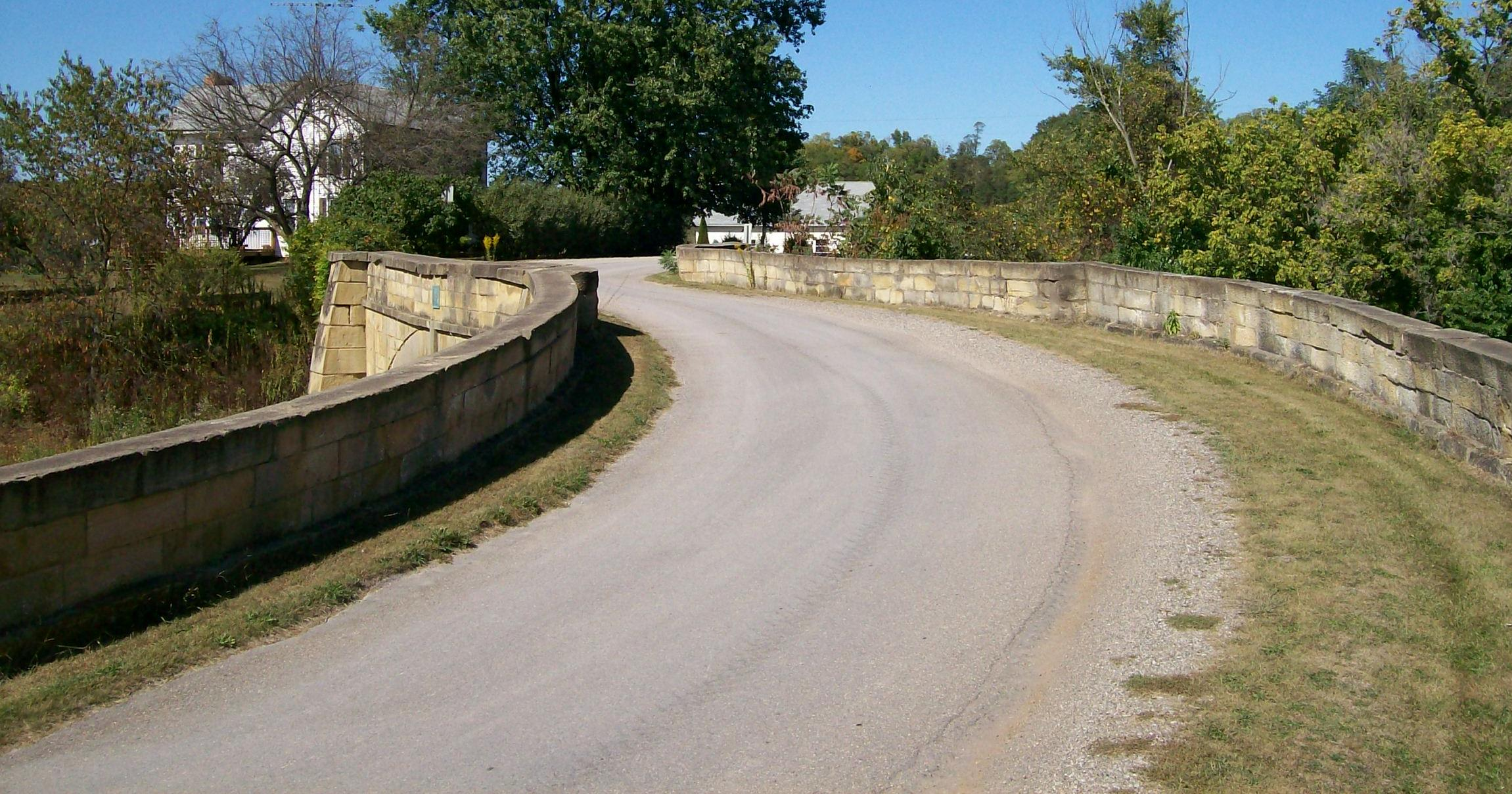
The S Bridge on the National Road east of Old Washington, Ohio

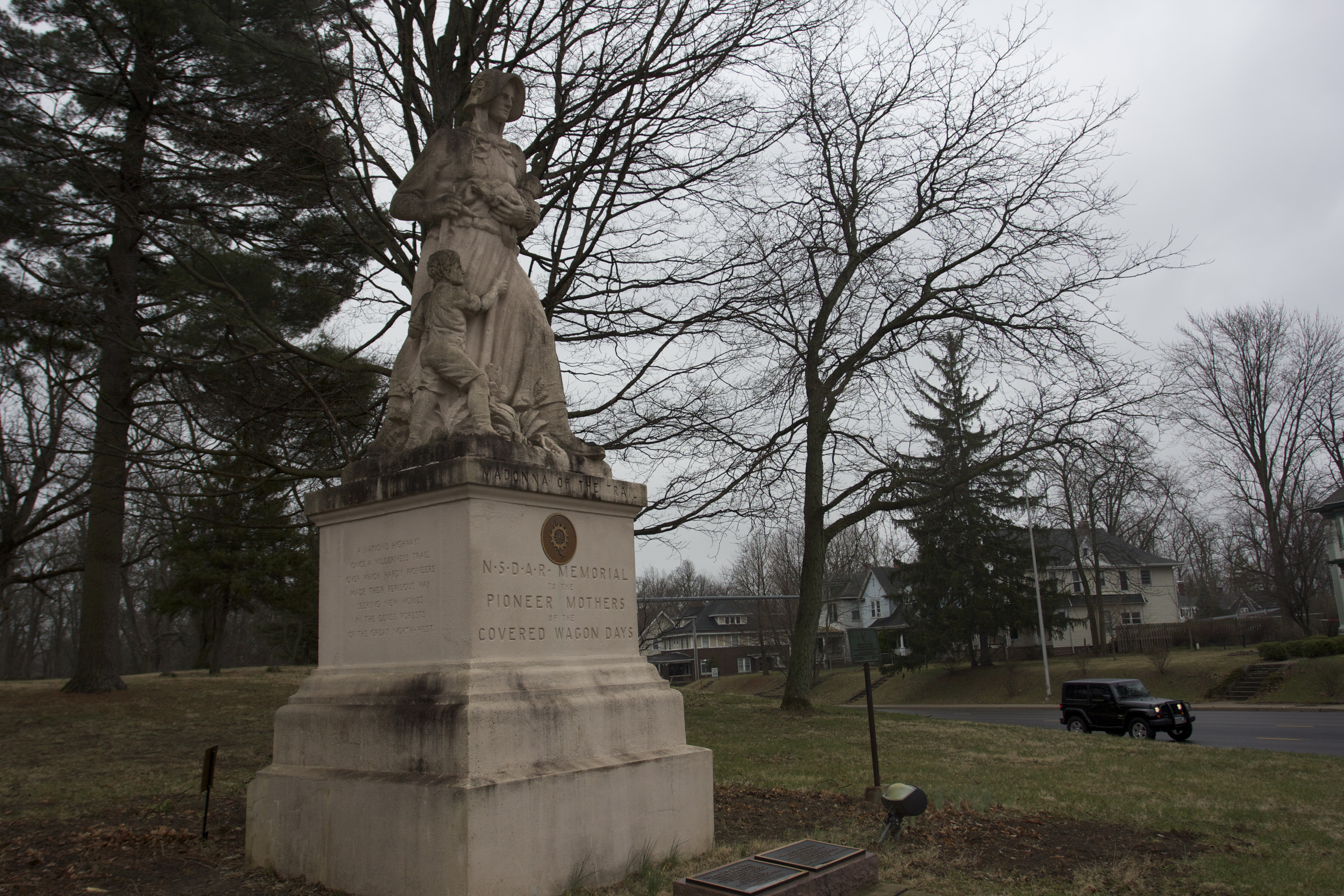
Madonna of the Trail in Richmond, Indiana, with the National Road in the background

In general, the road climbed westwards along the Amerindian trail known as Chief Nemacolin's Path, once followed and improved by a young George Washington, then also followed by the Braddock Expedition. Using the Cumberland Narrows, its first phase of construction crossed the Allegheny Mountains entered southwestern Pennsylvania, reaching the Allegheny Plateau in Somerset County, Pennsylvania. There, travelers could turn off to Pittsburgh or continue west through Uniontown and reach navigable water, the Monongahela River, at Brownsville, Pennsylvania, which was by then a major outfitting center and riverboat-building emporium. Many settlers boarded boats there to travel down the Ohio and up the Missouri, or elsewhere on the Mississippi watershed.

By 1818, travelers could press on, still following Chief Nemacolin's trail across the ford, or taking a ferry to West Brownsville, moving through Washington County, Pennsylvania, and passing into Wheeling, Virginia (now West Virginia), 45 miles (72 km) away on the Ohio River. Subsequent efforts pushed the road across the states of Ohio and Indiana and into the Illinois Territory. The western terminus of the National Road at its greatest extent was at the Kaskaskia River in Vandalia, Illinois, near the intersection of modern US 51 and US 40.

Today, travelers driving east from Vandalia travel along modern US 40 through south-central Illinois. The National Road continued into Indiana along modern US 40, passing through the cities of Terre Haute and Indianapolis. Within Indianapolis, the National Road used the original alignment of US 40 along West and East Washington Street (modern US 40 is now routed along I-465). East of Indianapolis, the road went through the city of Richmond before entering Ohio, where the road continued along modern US 40 and passed through the northern suburbs of Dayton, Springfield, and Columbus.

West of Zanesville, Ohio, despite US 40's predominantly following the original route, many segments of the original road can still be found. Between Old Washington and Morristown, the original roadbed has been overlaid by I-70. The road then continued east across the Ohio River into Wheeling in West Virginia, the original western end of the National Road when it was first paved. After running 15 miles (24 km) in West Virginia, the National Road then entered Pennsylvania.

The road cut across southwestern Pennsylvania, heading southeast for about 90 miles (140 km) before entering Maryland. East of Keyser's Ridge, the road used modern Alt US 40 to the city of Cumberland (modern US 40 is now routed along I-68). Cumberland was the original eastern terminus of the road.

In the mid-19th century, a turnpike extension to Baltimore was approved—along what is now Maryland Route 144 from Cumberland to Hancock, US 40 from Hancock to Hagerstown, Alternate US 40 from Hagerstown to Frederick, and Maryland Route 144 from Frederick to Baltimore. The approval process was a hotly debated subject because of the removal of the original macadam construction that made this road famous.

The road's route between Baltimore and Cumberland continues to use the name National Pike or Baltimore National Pike and as Main Street in Ohio today, with various portions now signed as US 40, Alt. US 40, or Maryland Route 144. A spur between Frederick, Maryland, and Georgetown (Washington, D.C.), now Maryland Route 355, bears various local names, but is sometimes referred to as the Washington National Pike; it is now paralleled by I-270 between the Capital Beltway (I-495) and Frederick.

== Millionaires' Row ==
Nicknamed the "Main Street of America", the road's presence in towns on its route and effective access to surrounding towns attracted wealthy residents to build their houses along the road in towns such as in Richmond, Indiana, and Springfield, Ohio, creating Millionaires' Rows.

== Historic designations ==
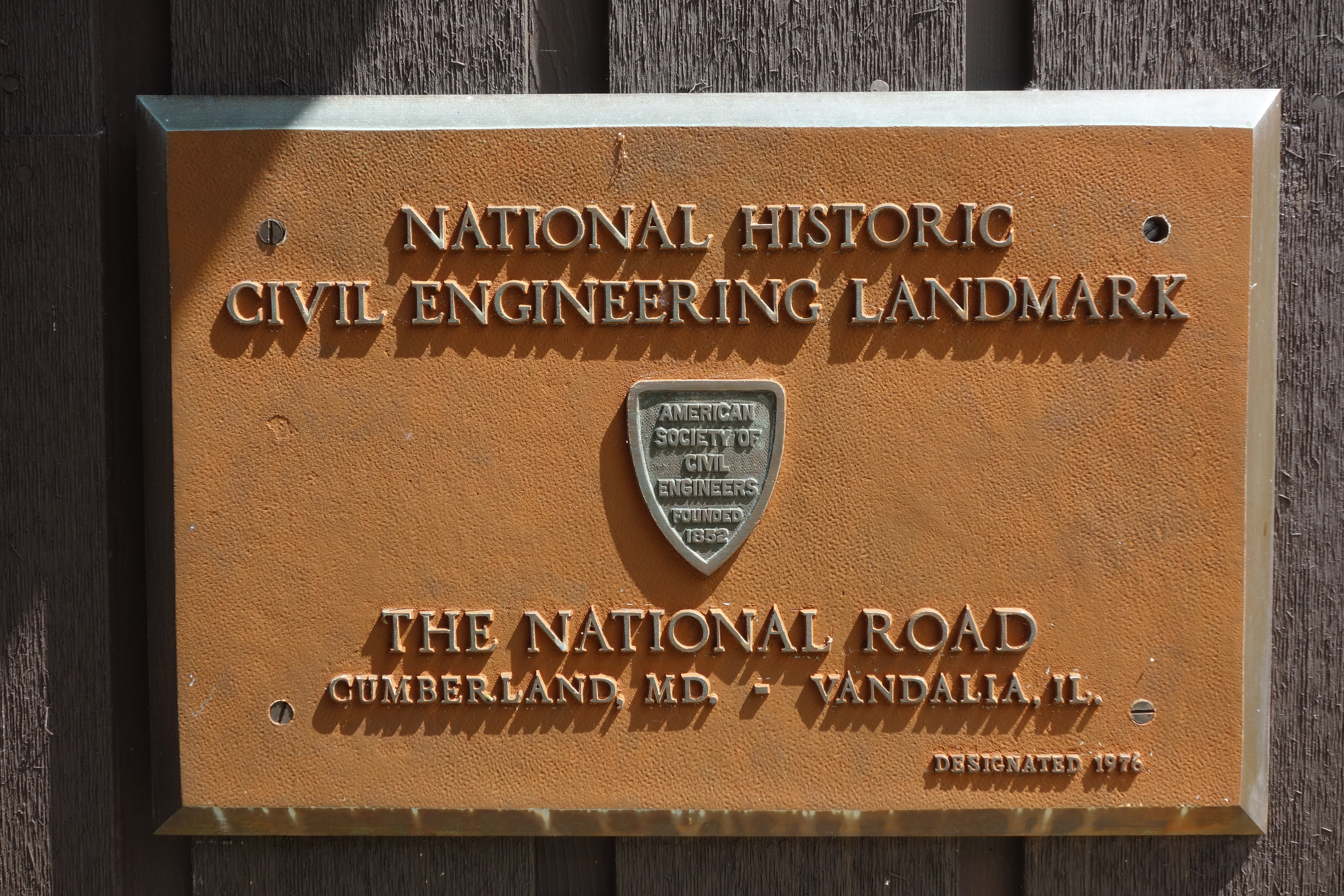
Plaque marking National Historic Civil Engineering Landmark designation

In 1976, the American Society of Civil Engineers designated the National Road as a National Historic Civil Engineering Landmark.

There are several structures associated with the National Road that are listed on the National Register of Historic Places. Some are listed below.

=== Maryland ===
- Sixty-nine milestones in Maryland on Maryland Route 144 and Maryland Route 165, U.S. Route 40, U.S. Route 40 Alternate, and U.S. Route 40 Scenic
- Inns on the National Road in Cumberland, Maryland, and Grantsville, Maryland
- Casselman River Bridge near Grantsville, Maryland

=== Pennsylvania ===
The Pennsylvania Historical and Museum Commission has installed five historical markers noting the historic importance of the road: one in Somerset County on August 10, 1947, one in Washington County on April 1, 1949, and three in Fayette County on October 12, 1948, October 12, 1948, and May 19, 1996.

- Petersburg Tollhouse in Addison, Pennsylvania
- Mount Washington Tavern adjacent to the Fort Necessity National Battlefield in Wharton Township, Pennsylvania
- Searights Tollhouse, National Road, in Uniontown, Pennsylvania
- Dunlap's Creek Bridge, near Brownsville, Pennsylvania, the first cast iron arch bridge in the United States. Completed in 1839, it was designed by Richard Delafield and built by the United States Army Corps of Engineers. Still in use, the bridge is also a National Historic Civil Engineering Landmark.
- Claysville S Bridge in Washington County, Pennsylvania, near Claysville, Pennsylvania

=== West Virginia ===
- Mile markers 8, 9, 10, 11, 13, and 14 in West Virginia
- National Road Corridor Historic District in Wheeling, West Virginia
- Wheeling Suspension Bridge in Wheeling, West Virginia

=== Ohio ===
- Various S bridges: One in New Concord, one near Old Washington, and one in Blaine
- Peacock Road in Cambridge, Ohio
- The Red Brick Tavern in Lafayette, Madison County, Ohio, built in 1837

=== Indiana ===
- Hudleston Farmhouse Inn in Mount Auburn, Indiana
- James Whitcomb Riley House in Greenfield, Indiana

=== Illinois ===
- Old Stone Arch, National Road, near Marshall, Illinois

== Gallery ==
National Road

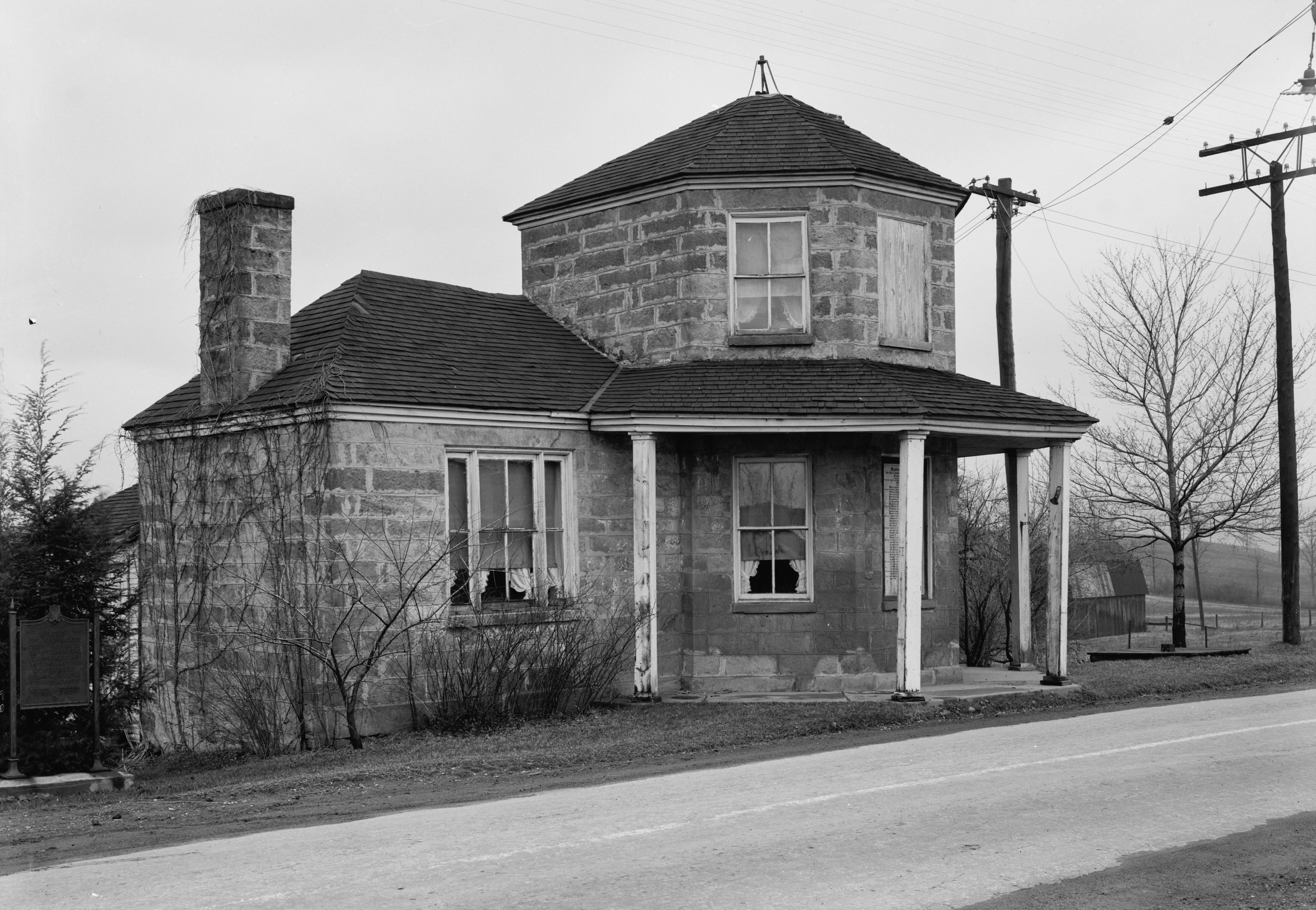
Petersburg Tollhouse, National Road, Addison, Pennsylvania

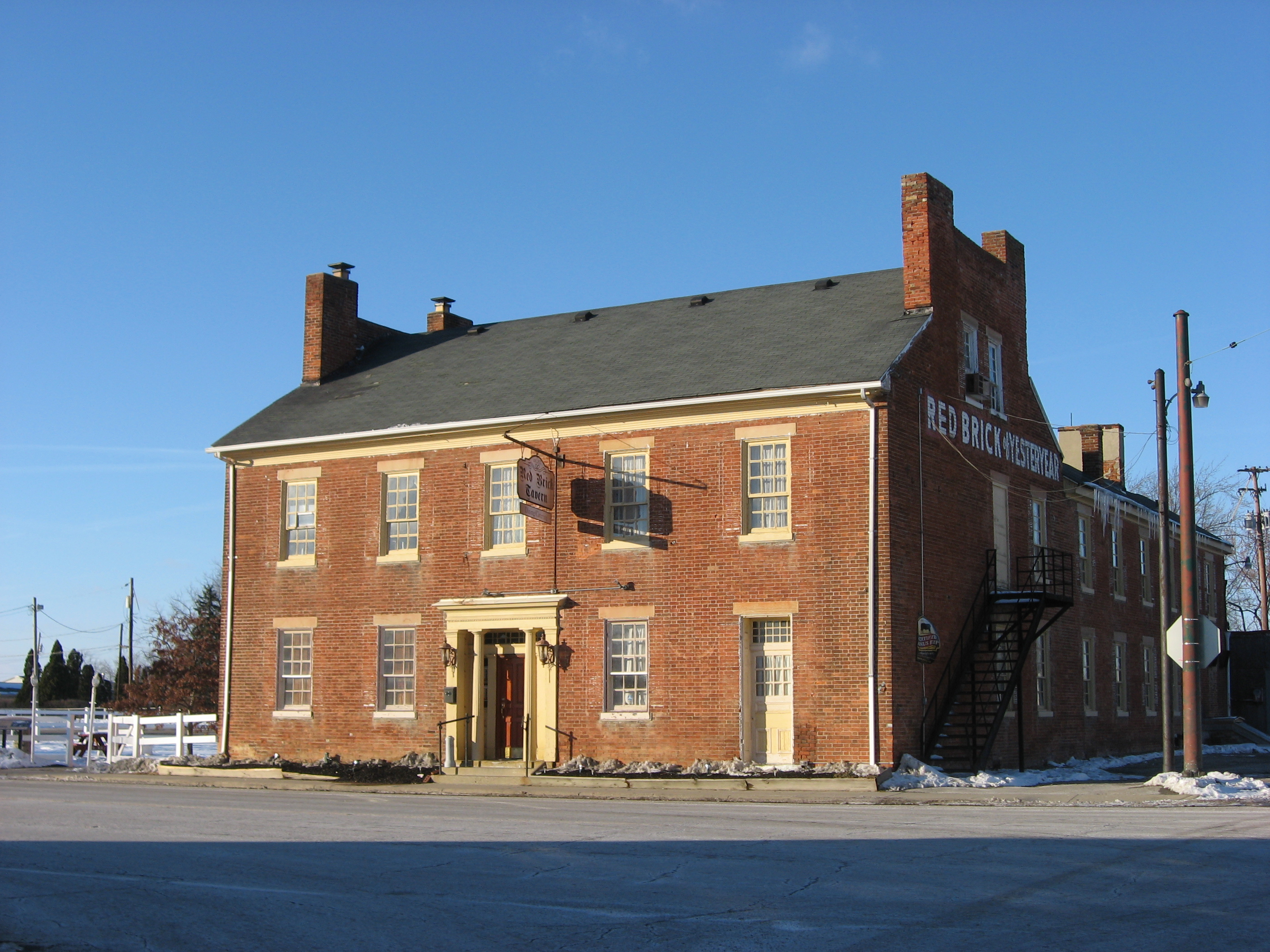
Red Brick Tavern, National Road, Lafayette, Ohio

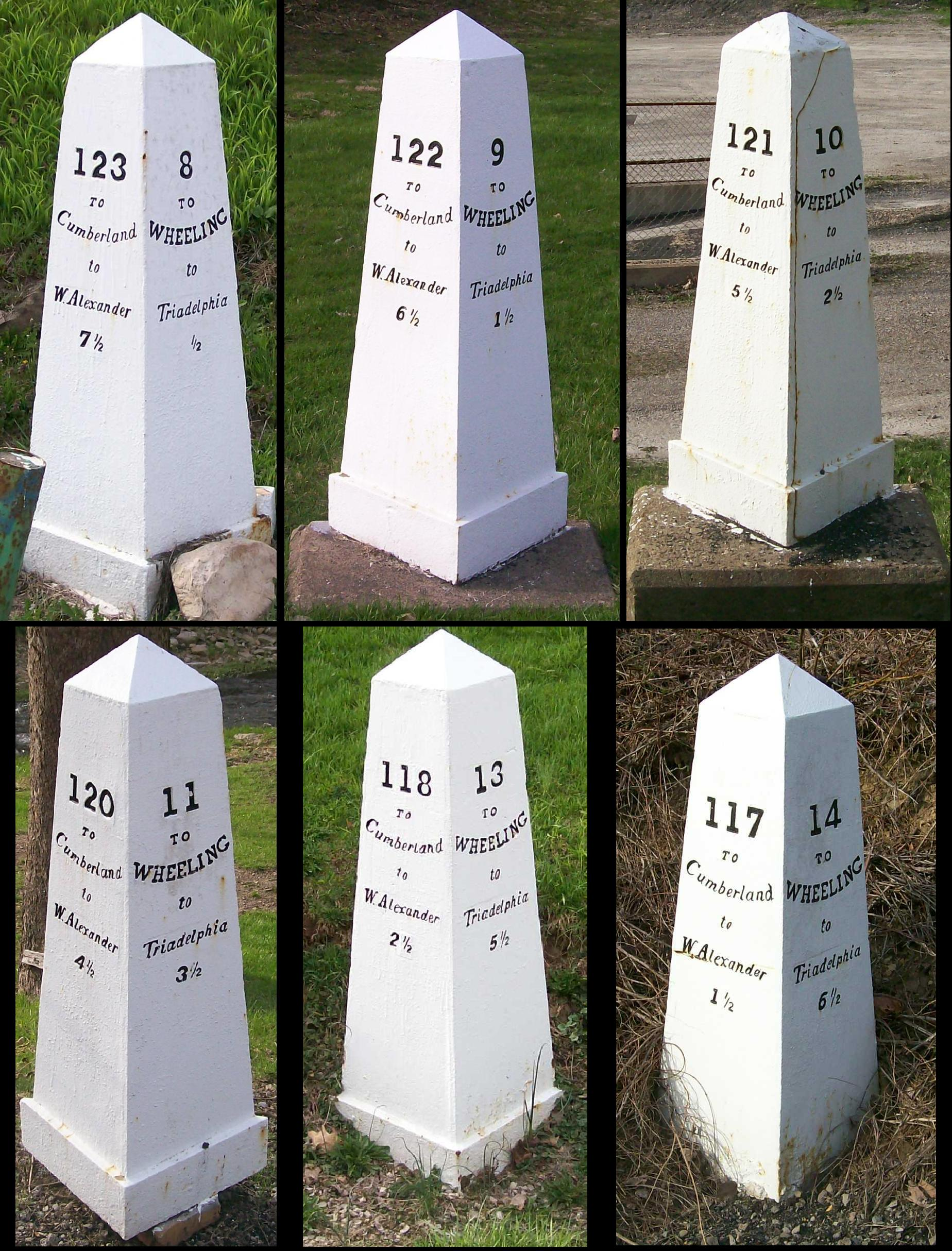
Mile markers, West Virginia

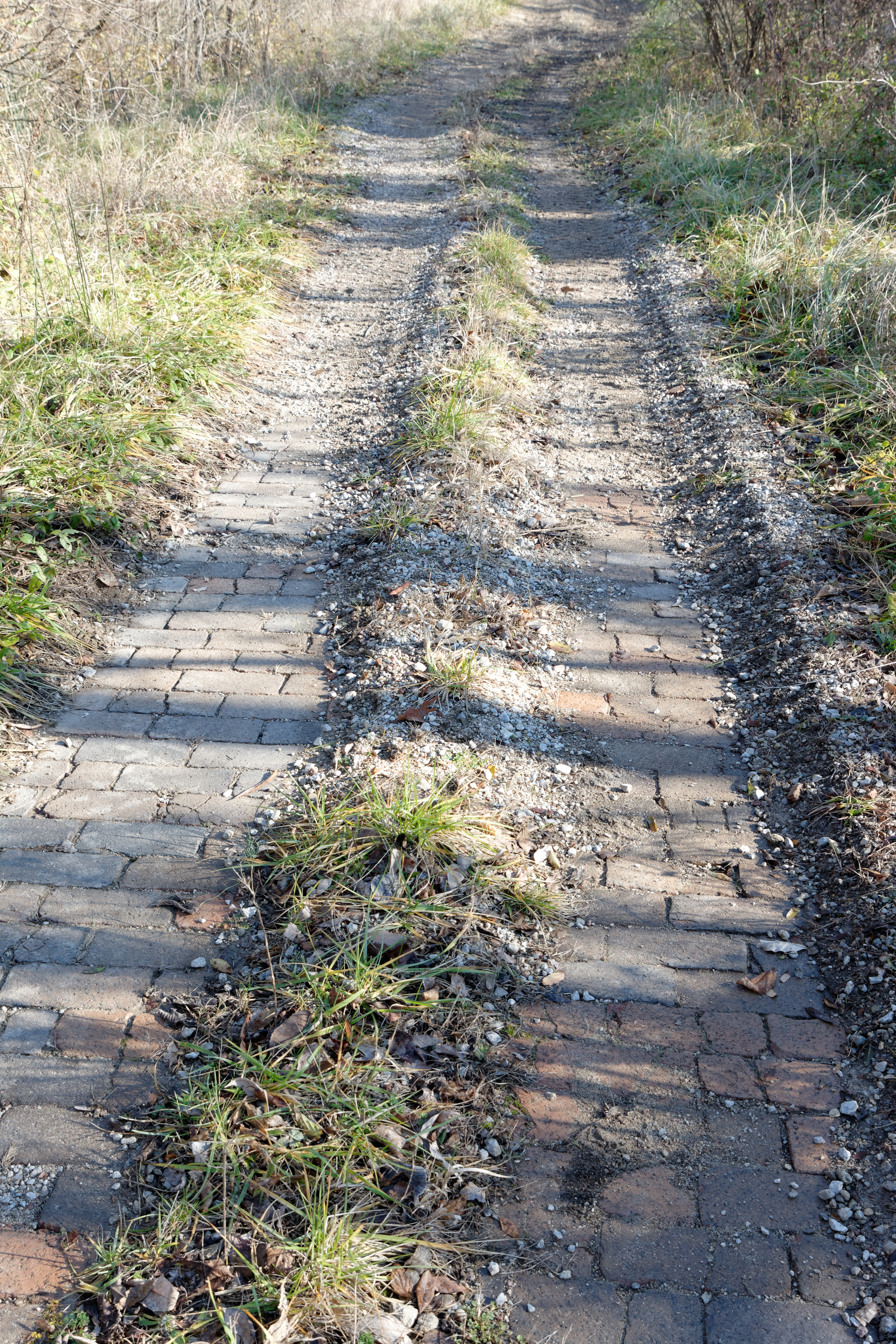
Abandoned section at Clark Center, Illinois

== See also ==
- National Old Trails Road (Ocean-to-Ocean Highway)
