= Addison, Pennsylvania =

Borough in Pennsylvania, US

- Borough
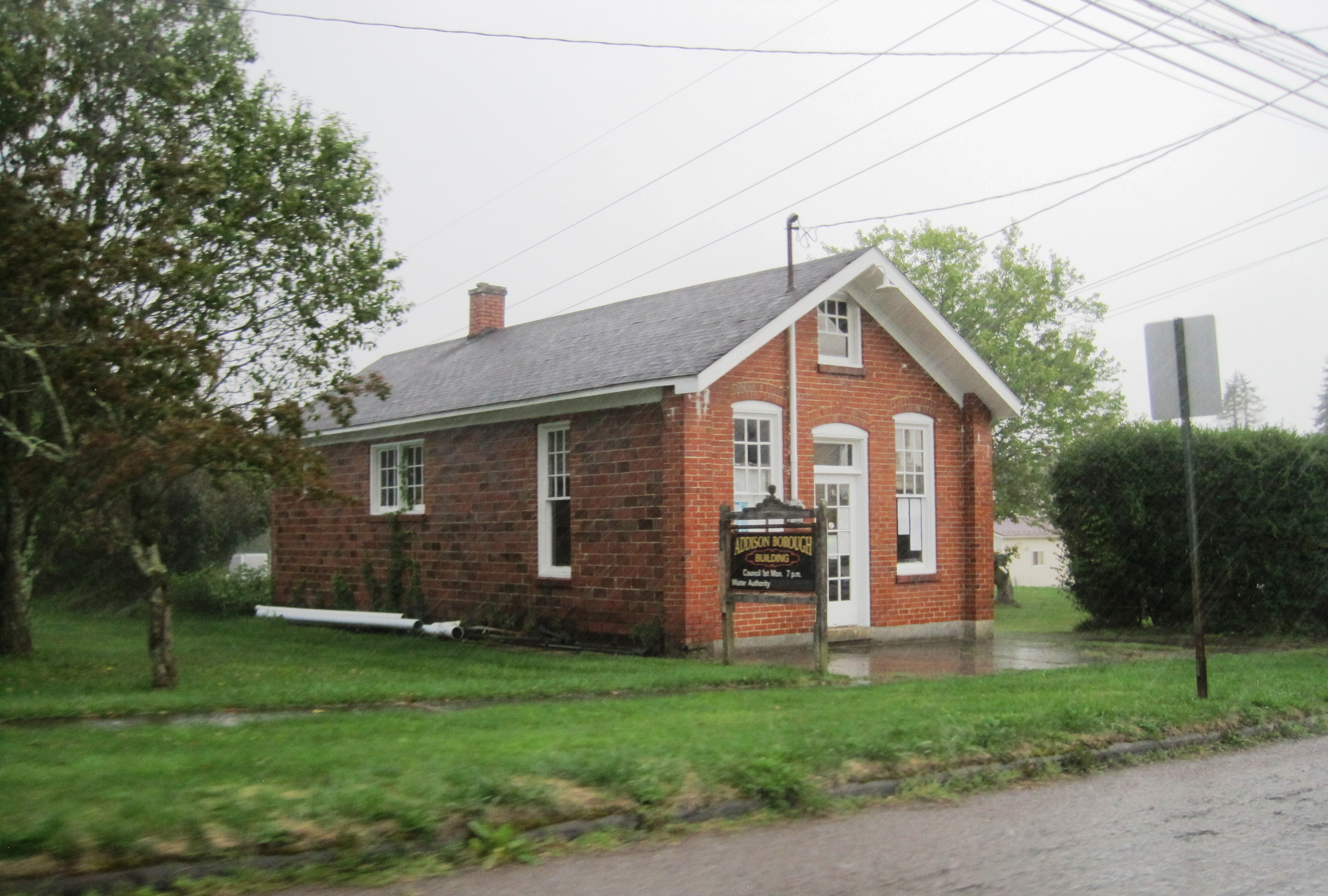
- Borough hall

- Location of Addison in Somerset County, Pennsylvania.

- Location within Pennsylvania and location of Pennsylvania within USA
- Coordinates: 39°44′43″N 79°19′59″W
- Country: United States
- State: Pennsylvania
- County: Somerset County
- Settled: 1798
- Incorporated: February 28, 1912

Area
  - Total: 0.54 sq mi (1.41 km^{2})
  - Land: 0.54 sq mi (1.41 km^{2})
  - Water: 0 sq mi (0.00 km^{2})

Population (2020)
  - Total: 166
  - Density: 305.4/sq mi (117.91/km^{2})
- Time zone: UTC-5 (EST)
  - Summer (DST): UTC-4 (EDT)
- FIPS code: 42-00396

Addison is a borough in Somerset County, Pennsylvania, United States. It is part of the Johnstown, Pennsylvania, Metropolitan Statistical Area. The population was 165 at the 2020 census.

== History ==
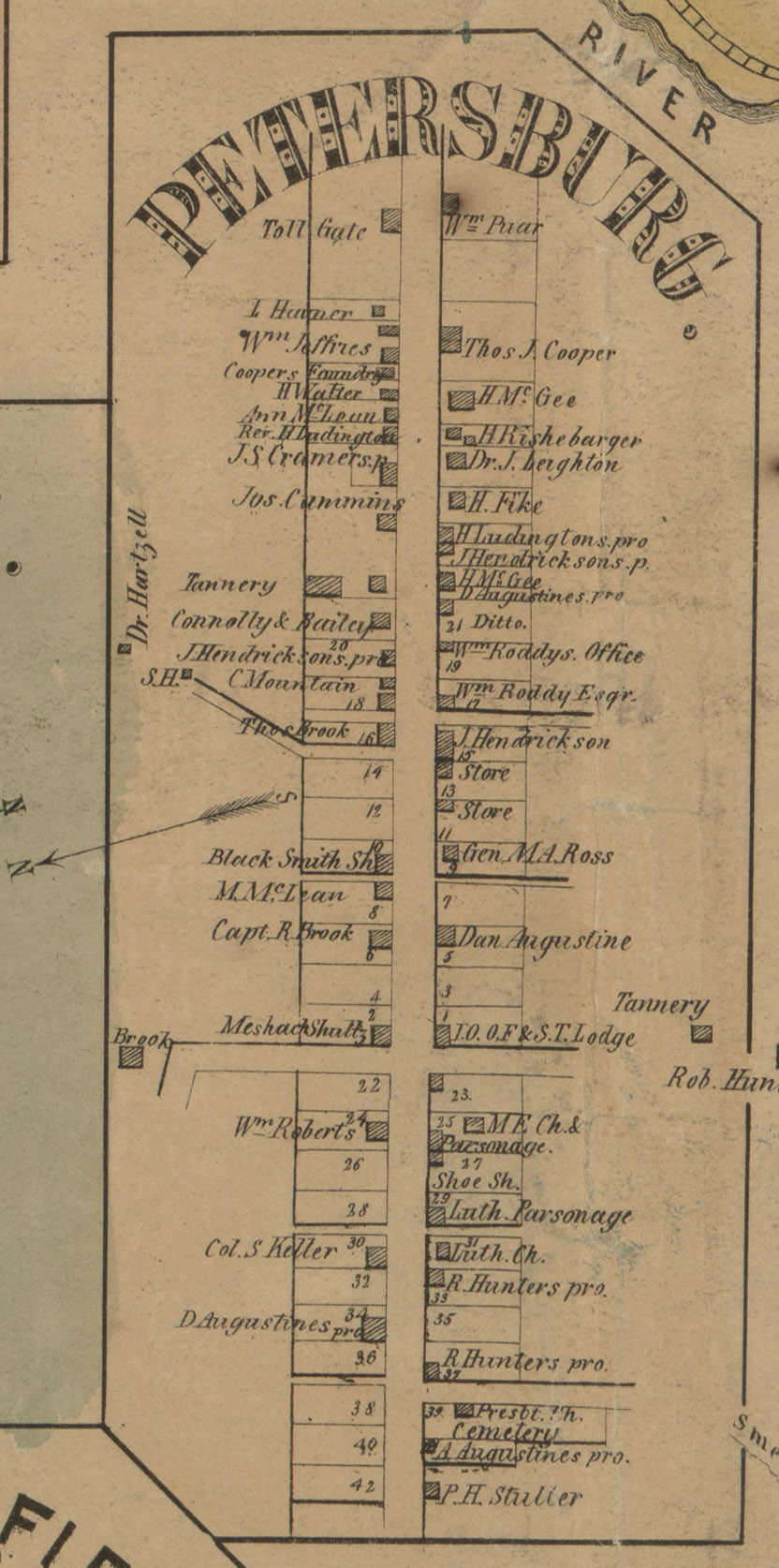
Petersburg, Somerset County, PA, 1860 (note orientation of map: east at top)

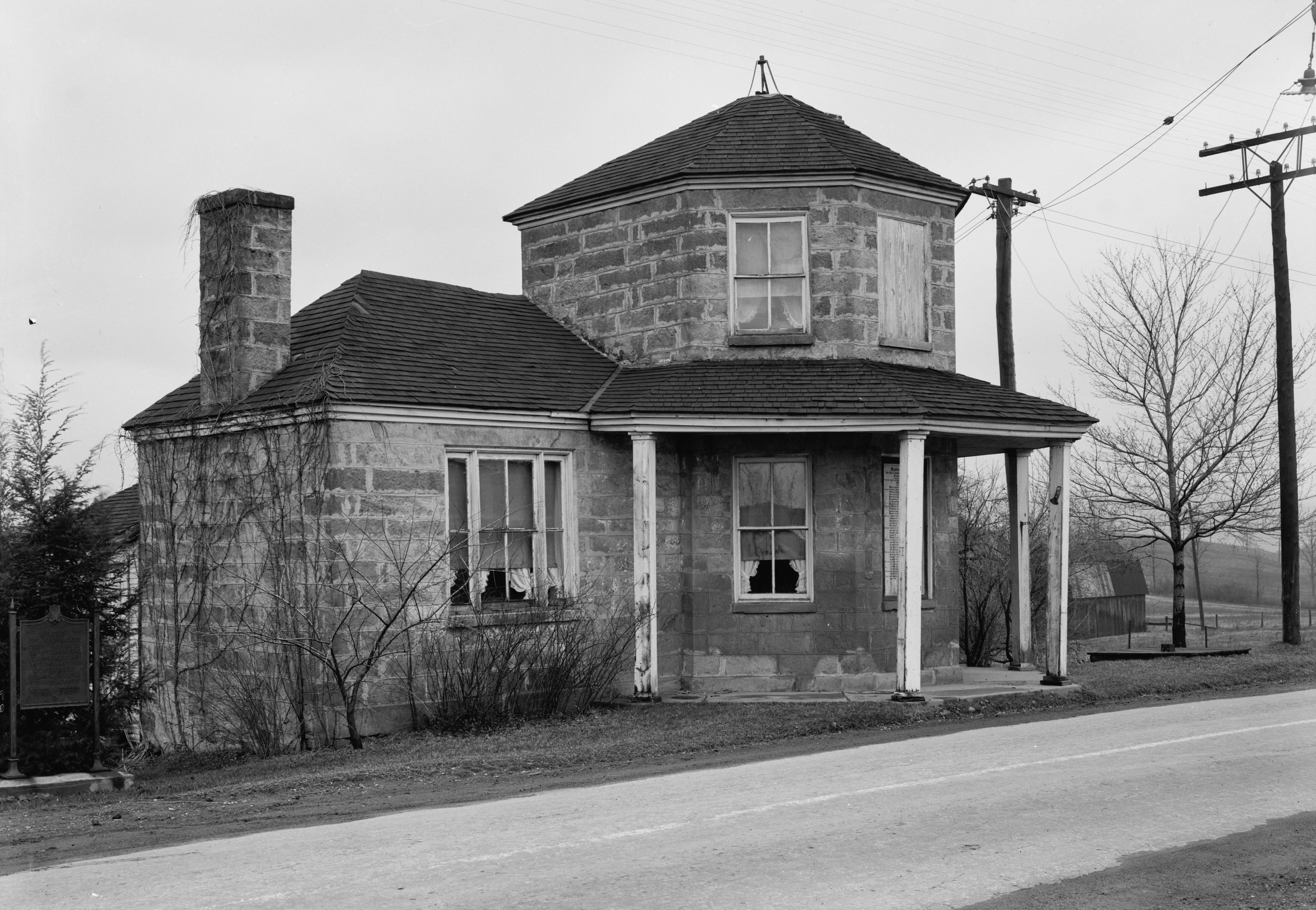
The Petersburg Tollhouse, on the National Road in Addison, Pennsylvania

Peter Augustine laid out the town of Petersburg, which later became Addison, in 1818. Henry Stuller built the first house here in 1820, the same year in which John Brown built a tavern. A schoolhouse was constructed about 1832, and a foundry was begun by Thomas & Nathan Cooper in 1844.

== Geography ==
Addison is located at 39°44′43″N 79°19′59″W (39.7472, -79.3331), about 30 miles (48 km) west-northwest of Cumberland, Maryland and about 30 miles (48 km) east-northeast of Morgantown, West Virginia. According to the United States Census Bureau, the borough has a total area of 0.6 square miles (1.6 km^{2}), all land. It is surrounded by Addison Township.

Addison was served by the National Road (now US 40). The Petersburg Tollhouse, one of several toll houses on that road, is now listed on the National Register of Historic Places.

== Demographics ==
Historical population
Census	Pop.	Note	%±
1920	190		—
1930	184		−3.2%
1940	199		8.2%
1950	237		19.1%
1960	222		−6.3%
1970	370		66.7%
1980	259		−30.0%
1990	212		−18.1%
2000	214		0.9%
2010	207		−3.3%
2020	166		−19.8%
2021 (est.)	178	▲	7.2%

At the 2000 census there were 214 people, 87 households, and 54 families residing in the borough. The population density was 380.4 inhabitants per square mile (146.9/km^{2}). There were 96 housing units at an average density of 170.6 per square mile (65.9/km^{2}). The racial makeup of the borough was 100.00% White. Of the 87 households, 26.4% had children under the age of 18 living with them, 57.5% were married couples living together, 4.6% had a female householder with no husband present, and 36.8% were non-families. 34.5% of households were one person, and 20.7% were one person aged 65 or older. The average household size was 2.34 and the average family size was 3.04.

In the borough the population was spread out, with 19.2% under the age of 18, 11.7% from 18 to 24, 27.1% from 25 to 44, 21.5% from 45 to 64, and 20.6% 65 or older. The median age was 42 years. For every 100 females there were 96.3 males. For every 100 females age 18 and over, there were 90.1 males.

The median household income was $25,833 and the median family income was $34,250. Males had a median income of $28,750 versus $22,917 for females. The per capita income for the borough was $14,963. About 5.1% of families and 13.9% of the population were below the poverty line, including 6.1% of those under the age of eighteen and 25.4% of those sixty five or over.
