= Searights Tollhouse, National Road =

Historic tollhouse in Pennsylvania, United States

- U.S. National Register of Historic Places
- U.S. National Historic Landmark
- Pennsylvania state historical marker
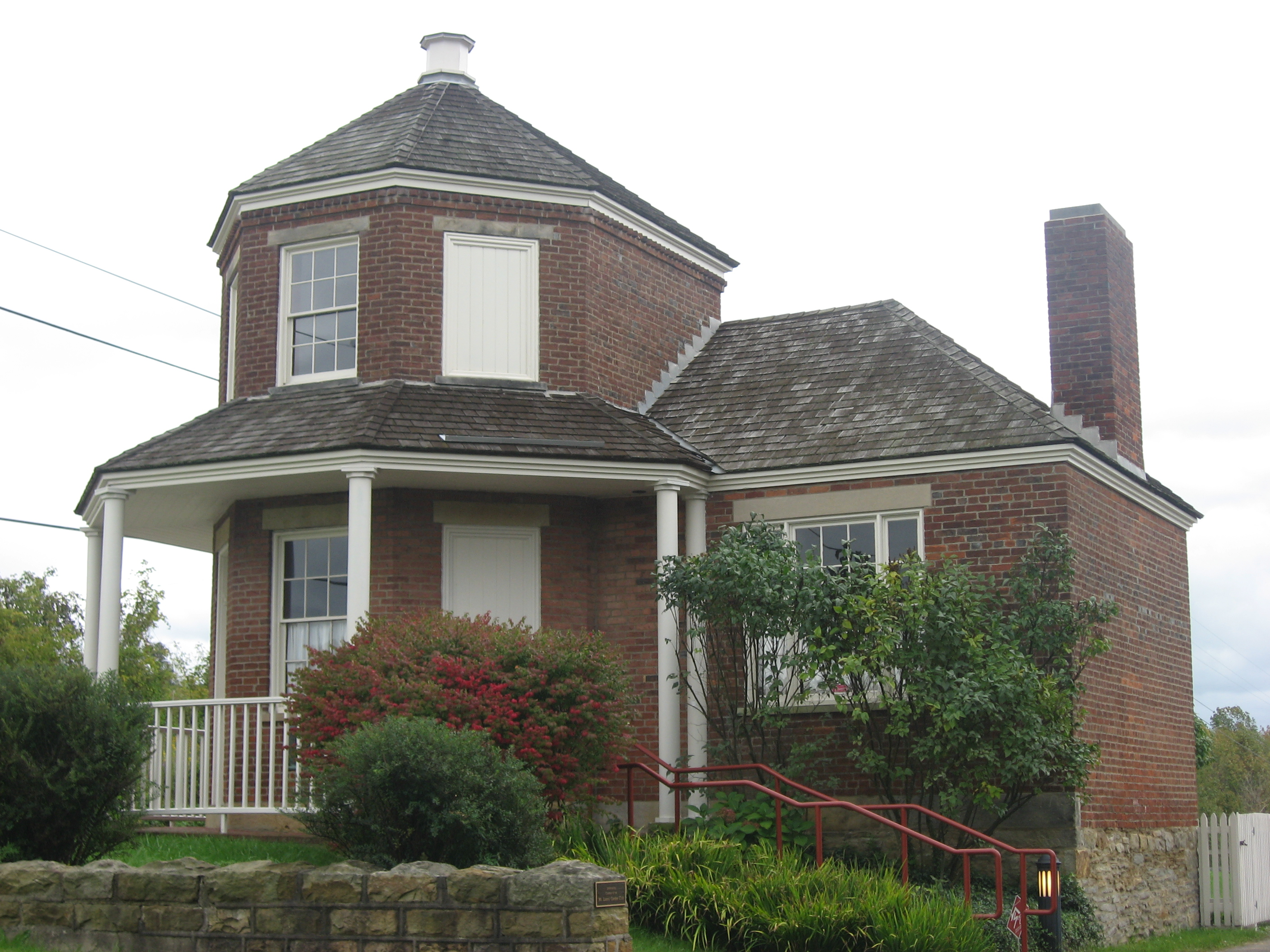
- Western side of the tollhouse

- Location within Pennsylvania Location within the United States
- Nearest city: Uniontown, Pennsylvania
- Coordinates: 39°56′49.8″N 79°47′40.4″W
- Area: less than one acre
- Built: 1835
- NRHP reference No.: 66000665

Significant dates
- Added to NRHP: October 15, 1966
- Designated NHL: January 29, 1964
- Designated PHMC: n/a

The Searights Tollhouse of the National Road is a historic toll house on US 40, the former route of the historic National Road, north of Uniontown, Pennsylvania. Built in 1835, it is one of two surviving tollhouses (out of six) built by the state of Pennsylvania to collect tolls along the portion of the road that passed through that state. It has been restored by the state and is now maintained by the local historical society. It was declared a National Historic Landmark in 1964.

Surviving family members of William Searight relocated into Pittsburgh.

== Description and history ==
The Searights Tollhouse is located about 5 miles (8.0 km) northwest of Uniontown, and stands on the west side of US 40 north of its junction with Dearth Road. It is a brick building whose most prominent feature is a two-story octagonal tower about 20 feet (6.1 m) tall, capped by an octagonal roof and small octagonal cap. A single-story porch extends around about three-quarters of the tower, and there are two single-story single-room wings extending to the north and west. The building was designed so that the tollkeeper had good views of the road in both directions, and was originally fitted with a swinging gate that would block the road.

The portion of the National Road that passes through Pennsylvania was built between 1811 and 1818, and was one of the first public works projects of the federal government. The road greatly improved travel times between the Cumberland, Maryland, and Wheeling, West Virginia, and the Pennsylvania stretch in particular benefited from economic development along its route. In 1835 the federal government turned control over the road to the state. In order to maintain the roadway, the state instituted tolls, building six tollhouses along its route. This one was built near the tavern of William Searight, the state commissioner in charge of the roadway. Tolls were collected on the road until the 1870s, after which the tollhouse was abandoned. It was restored by the state, and now stands as a historic marker along the road.

== See also ==
- Petersburg Tollhouse, Pennsylvania's other surviving National Road tollhouse
- List of National Historic Landmarks in Pennsylvania
- National Register of Historic Places listings in Fayette County, Pennsylvania
