= Round House (Barnstable, Massachusetts) =

Historic house in Massachusetts, United States

- U.S. National Register of Historic Places
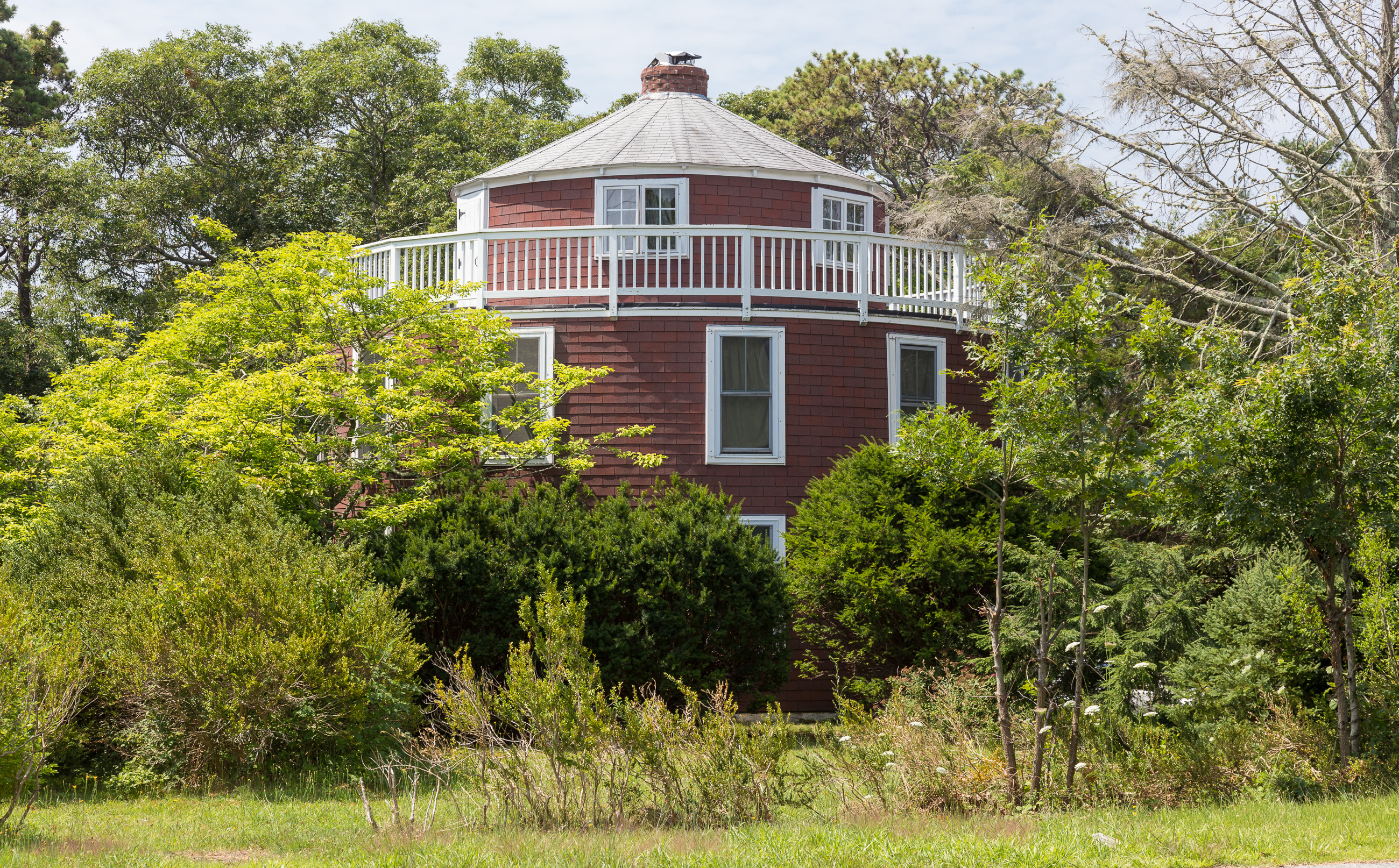

- Location within Cape Cod Location within Massachusetts Location within the United States
- Location: Barnstable, Massachusetts
- Coordinates: 41°39′23″N 70°19′46″W
- Area: 1.24 acres (0.50 ha)
- Built: 1930
- Architect: William Jr. Boyne
- MPS: Barnstable MRA
- NRHP reference No.: 87000282
- Added to NRHP: March 13, 1987

The Round House is a historic house located at 971 West Main Street in the Centerville village of Barnstable, Massachusetts.

== Description and history ==
The three-story wood-frame round house was built in 1930 by William Boyne, and is the only known round house in Barnstable. The building has two full stories, which are topped by a flat roof and an enlarged cupola section with truncated conical roof. A circular brick chimney rises through the center of the house.

The house was listed on the National Register of Historic Places on March 13, 1987.

== See also ==
- National Register of Historic Places listings in Barnstable County, Massachusetts
