= The Round Houses in Moscow =

Residential building complex in Russia

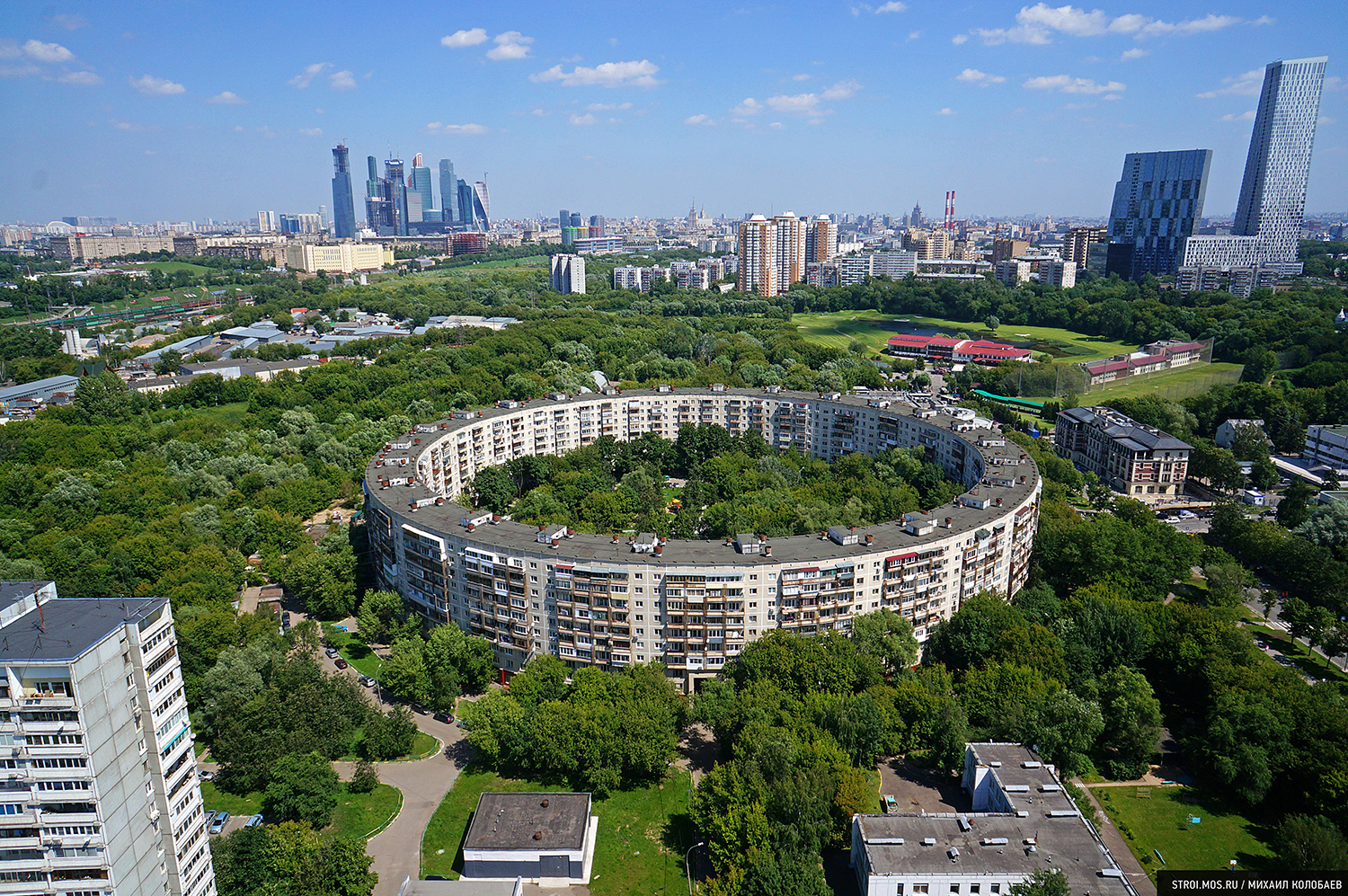
The Round house at Dovzhenko Street, 2018.

The Round Houses are two nine-floor residential buildings built circularly, in Western Moscow in 1970, according to a project by architect Yevgeny Stamo and engineer Aleksandr Markelov. They are located at 55°43′21″N 37°30′49″E and 55°42′26″N 37°28′14″E. They were built in a design very different from the regular panel block houses of the era.

The diameter of the structure is 155 meters (around 500 feet). It has 26 entrances, 913 apartments and six big archways to enter the courtyard. The first floor of the building contained pharmacies, shops, hair salons, a laundry and tailor shop, a children's club, and even a library. The isolated courtyard has its own park, with playgrounds for kids and feels like it is a long way away from the busy town. The rooms here are not rectangular but more like trapezoids, which makes it harder to place furniture. Also the courtyard has bad acoustics – a small noise echoes a lot, it bounces from the walls making it noisy at night if something is happening in the courtyard.

== History ==
The two younger architects, Stamo and Markelov wanted to design their own housing project to diversify from the typical Soviet planned architecture. The main communist architectural authority and the Moscow Mosproject-1 institute let them step out from the standard solutions and make a round building.

In 1972, the construction of the first round building in Nezhinskaya Street was completed. It made a big impression on the people of Moscow and of all the USSR, and for a long time there was an urban legend that the houses were built for the Moscow Olympics and that a whole block of such buildings was designed in the shape of the Olympic rings. According to Sergei Tekchenko, former head of the Genplan Institute of Moscow, this version was distributed in the press for no reason: first, round houses seized too much land, and secondly, they turned out to be less cost-effective than standard buildings.

The costs increased due to the need for constant monitoring of a single project, in addition, such houses required monolithic additions, which increased the cost of the construction and the duration of its construction. The real idea of the project was to try to restore the "old Soviet residential yard", to add attractiveness to the typical built-up areas and to provide the residents the necessary infrastructures within walking distance. Thus, the first floor of the building was reserved for facilities such as shops, pharmacies and a library. This first building contains 913 apartments and 26 entrances.

In 1979, a second house was built on Dovzhenko Street with 26 entrances again, but with 936 apartments. It was built near the Mosfilm Studios, the Houses has often appeared in Soviet films and the best apartments were given away to the actors of the cinema and theater.

After a few years, the disadvantages of this form of building became apparent: strong winds constantly blowing inside the yard, abnormally high sound pollution, a significant portion of the apartments did not meet the required insolation standards. Repairs in the apartments are difficult to make due to the trapezoidal shape of the rooms and often residents and guests have difficulty finding the right entrances.

As a result, after the construction of the house on Dovzhenko Street was completed, no such buildings were built. Despite all the weaknesses of the project, after about half a century, architectural scholars call it a project that preceded its time and paralleled it to the modern Apple Park in California. Former Moscow Chief Architect Mikhail Posokhin praised Stamo's contribution to the urban landscape and placed him alongside architects such as Vasily Bazhenov and Alexey Shchusev who also contributed to Moscow's urban landscape.

== Gallery ==
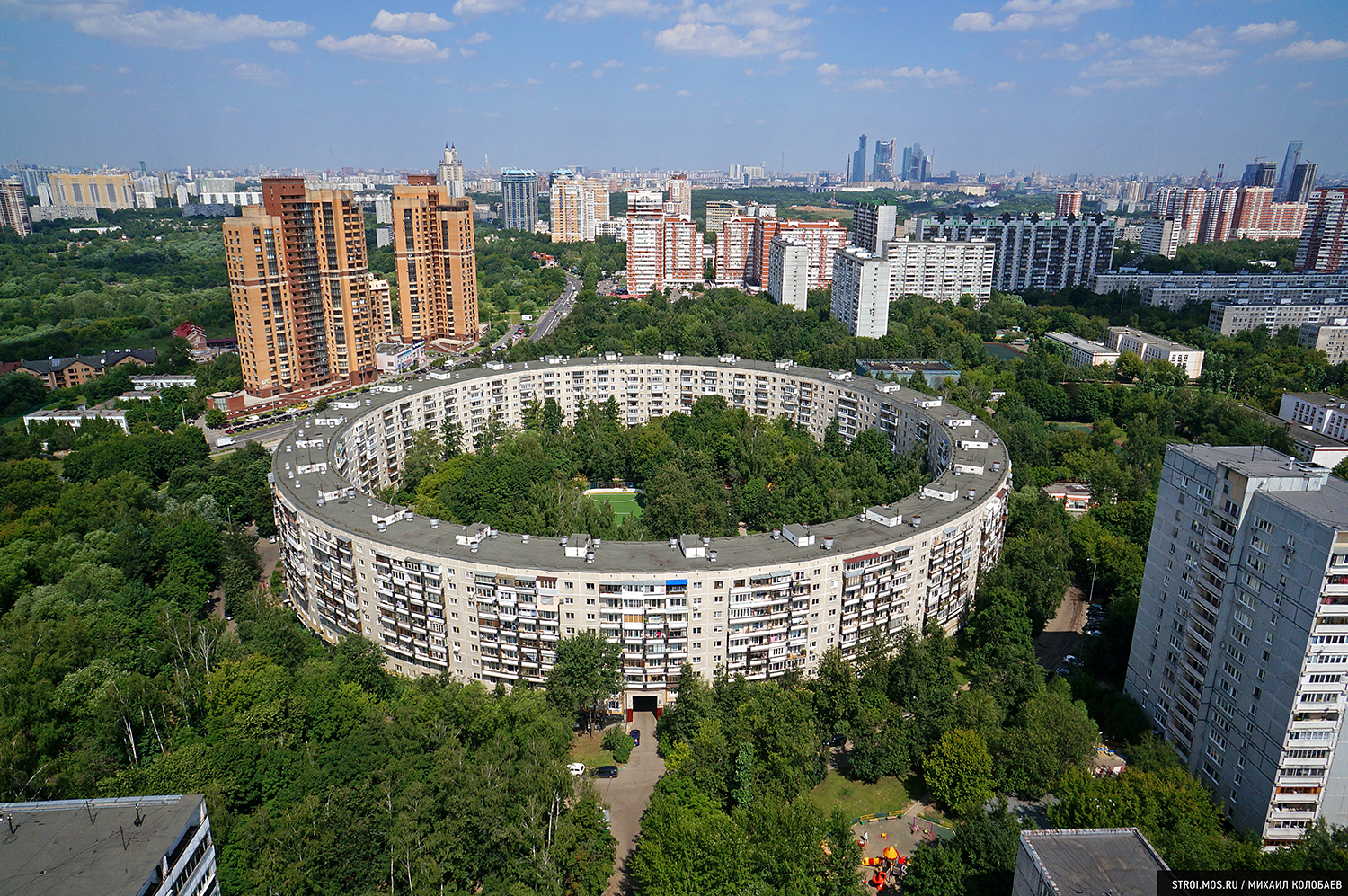
Round House in Nezhinskaya Street, 2018

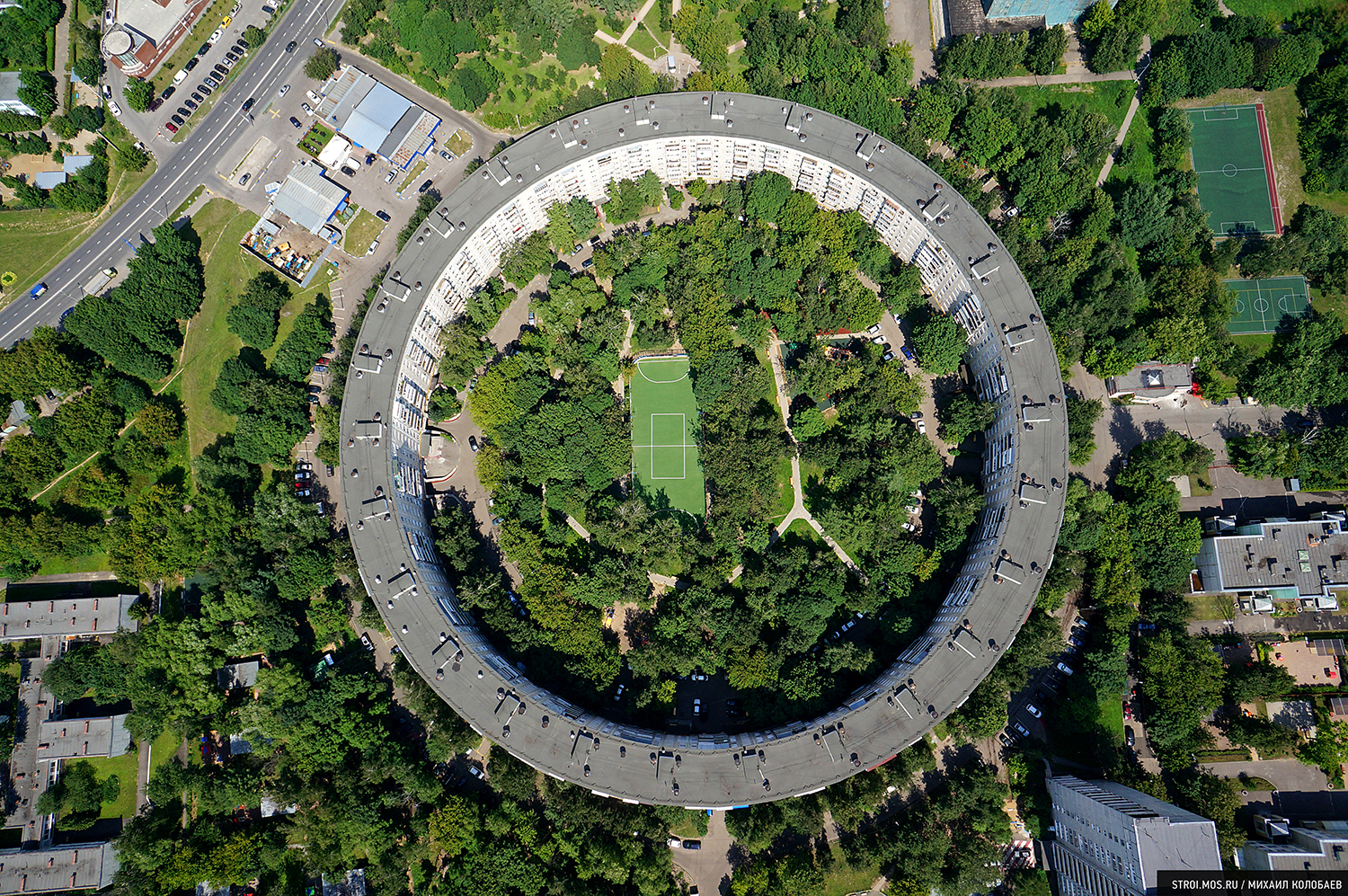
2018

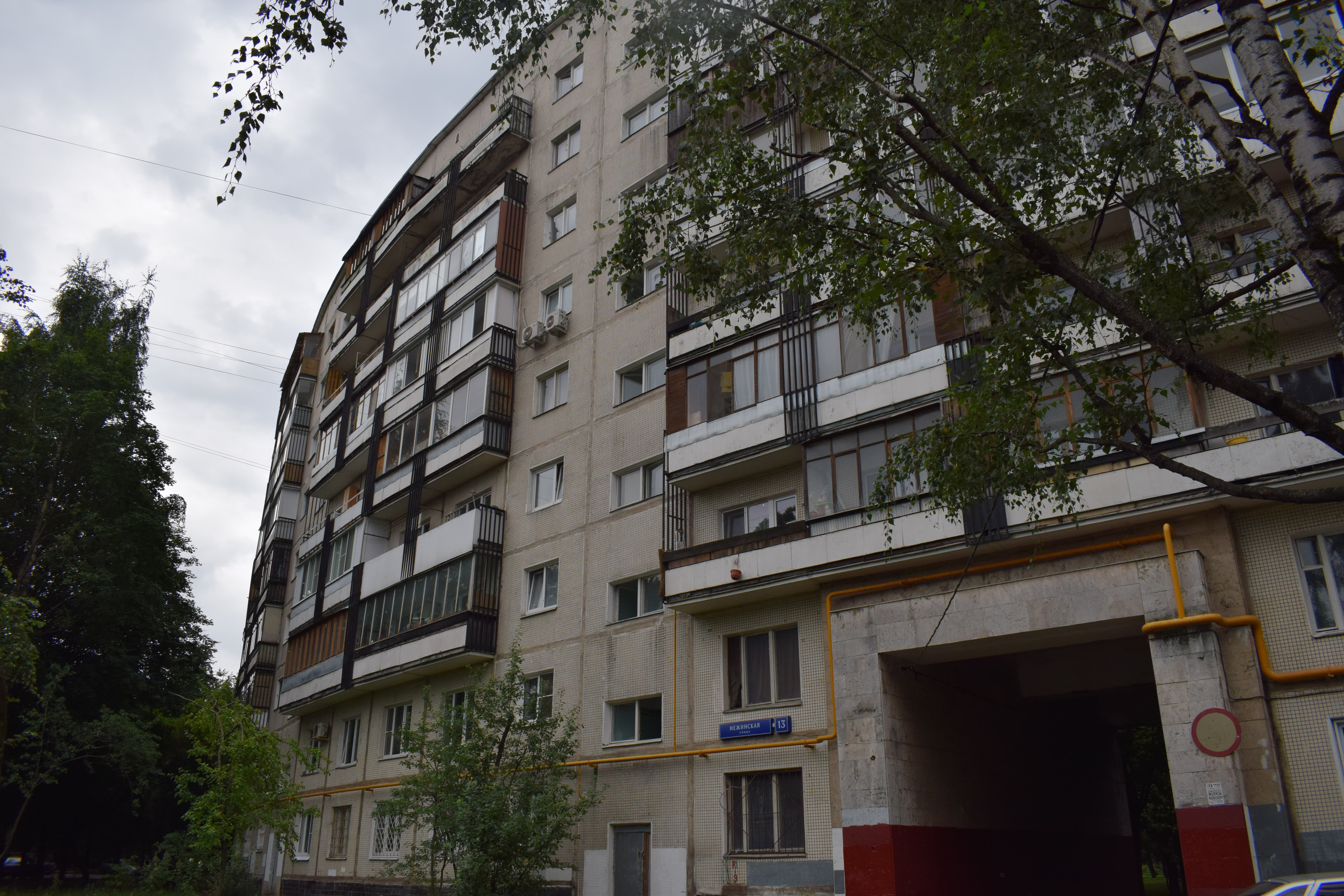
2017

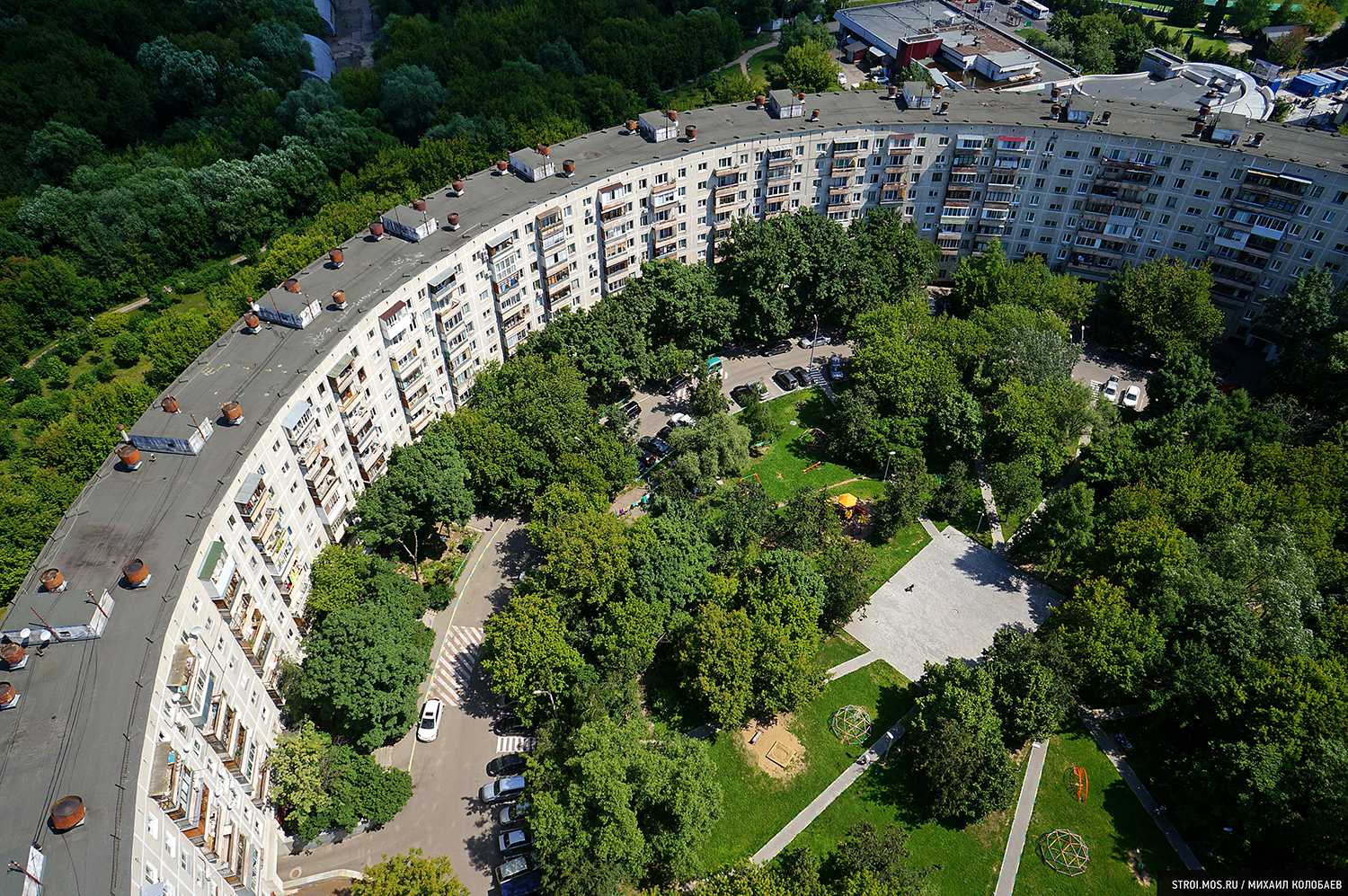
2018

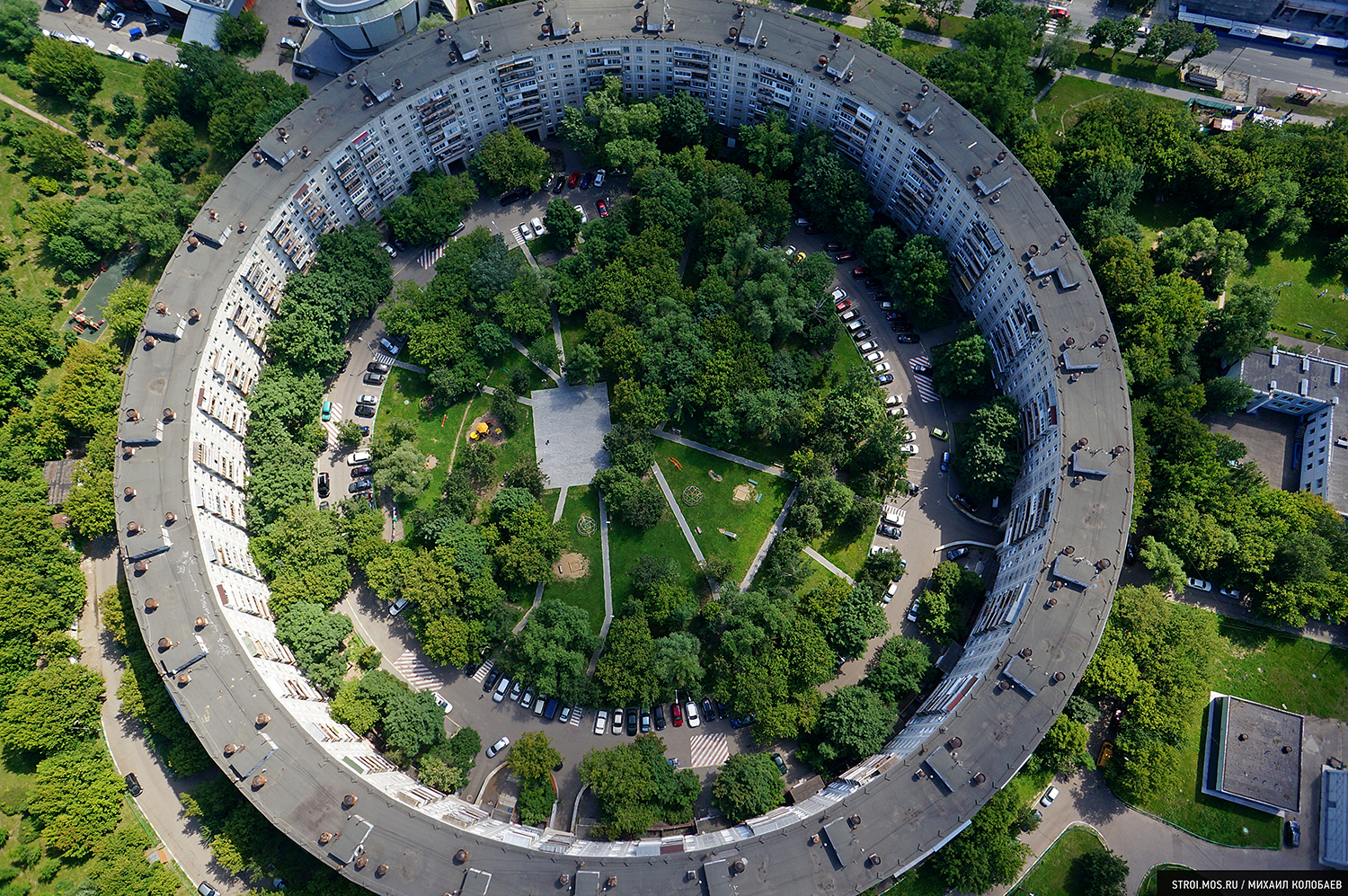
2018
