= La Vale Tollgate House =

Historic tollhouse in Maryland, United States

- U.S. National Register of Historic Places
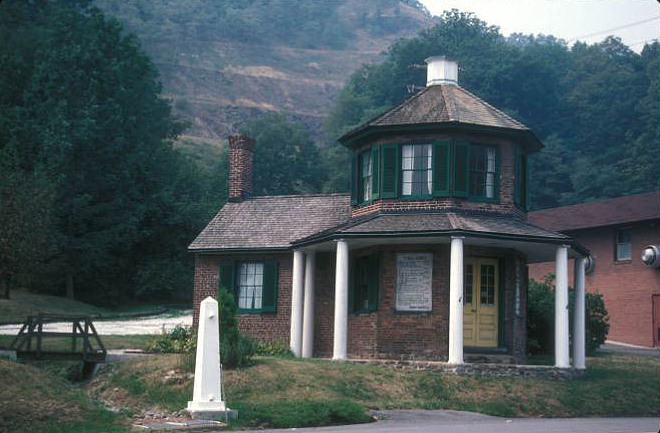

- Location within Maryland Location within the United States
- Location: 14302 National Hwy., US 40; La Vale, Maryland
- Coordinates: 39°38′15″N 78°51′6″W
- Area: 1.4 acres (0.57 ha)
- Built: 1835
- NRHP reference No.: 71000363
- Added to NRHP: January 25, 1971

La Vale Tollgate House is a historic toll house in La Vale, Allegany County, Maryland, United States. It is a two-story brick structure built in 1835–1836, with seven sides—a basic polygon plan. A one-story Tuscan-columned porch extends around the five outer sides of the polygonal portion. On top is a non-functional reconstructed cupola. The building served as a toll house on the Cumberland or National Road and was the first such structure to be erected.

La Vale Tollgate House was listed on the National Register of Historic Places in 1971.
