= The Round House, Stanton Drew =

Round House
- Toll House
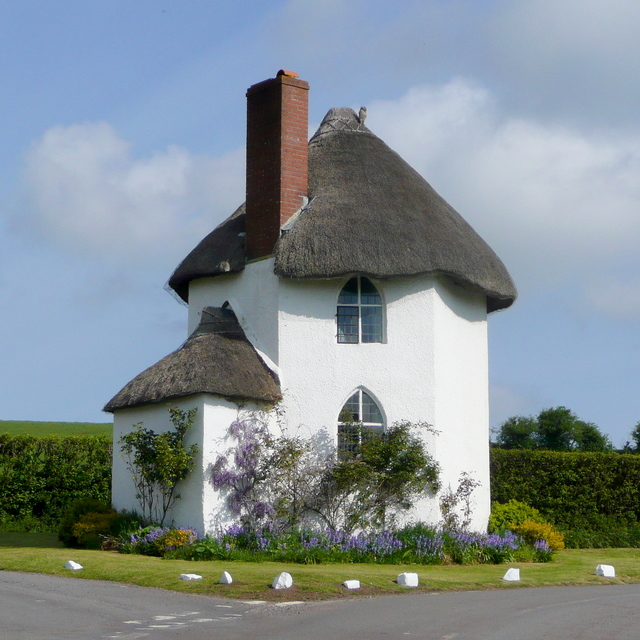

- Location within Somerset
- 51°22′13″N 2°34′52″W
- Location: Stanton Drew, Somerset, England

History
- Built: 18th century

Listed Building – Grade II
- Designated: 4 December 1986
- Reference no.: 1136251

The Round House (also known as The Toll House) at Stanton Drew in the English county of Somerset was built in the 18th century. It has been designated as a Grade II listed building.

The two-storey thatched building is hexagonal in plan. It is on the road between Chew Magna and Pensford and close to the bridge over the River Chew.

It was built around 1793 by the West Harptree Turnpike Trust and served as a toll house when turnpikes were in use. A pouch hung on a hook over the door was used by coach drivers to pay the toll.

In the 1850s it was home to the Burridge family who acted as the toll collectors until the Turnpike Trust was abolished in 1876. From 1896 to the 1940s was lived in by Frederick Rich. It was still occupied in 2012.

On the ground floor are a kitchen and shower room, and there is a bedroom on the first floor. The total living space is 24 square meters.
