= Maryland Route 49 =

State highway in Allegany County, Maryland, US, known as Braddock Rd

Maryland Route 49
- Braddock Road
- Maryland Route 49 highlighted in red

Route information
- Maintained by MDSHA and City of Cumberland
- Length: 1.02 mi (1.64 km) Officially referenced length; signed length is 2.7 miles (4.3 km)
- Existed: 1927–present

Major junctions
- West end: MD 658 in La Vale
- East end: Greene Street in Cumberland

Location
- Country: United States
- State: Maryland
- Counties: Allegany

Highway system
- Maryland highway system; Interstate; US; State; Scenic Byways
← MD 47	→ US 50

Maryland Route 49 (MD 49) is a state highway located in Allegany County in the U.S. state of Maryland. Known as Braddock Road, the state highway runs 2.7 miles (4.3 km) from MD 658 in La Vale east to Greene Street in Cumberland. MD 49 is maintained by the Maryland State Highway Administration (MDSHA) for 1.02 miles (1.64 km) on the west side of Haystack Mountain. The 1.7-mile (2.7 km) eastern segment, which is maintained by the city of Cumberland, is not recognized as part of the state highway by MDSHA but is signed as MD 49. Braddock Road was cleared as a military trail in the 1750s and was part of the National Road in the early 19th century. The modern MD 49 was constructed in the 1920s. The state highway originally extended west to MD 53 just south of U.S. Route 40 (US 40), but the highway was physically truncated by the construction of Interstate 68 (I-68) in the early 1970s. The eastern part of MD 49 was transferred to Cumberland in the early 1990s.

== Route description ==
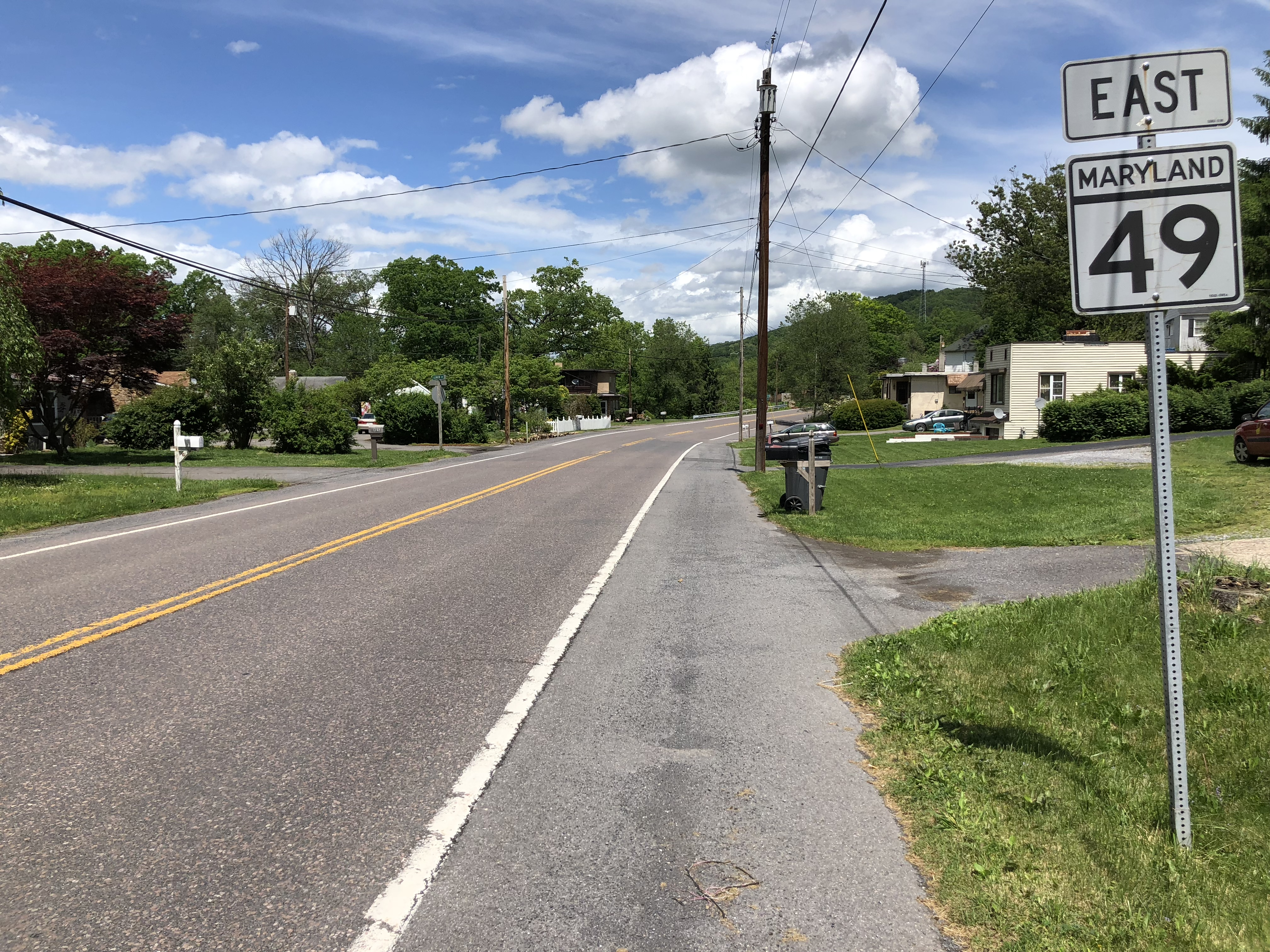
View east from the west end of MD 49 at MD 658 in La Vale

MD 49 begins as the east leg of an intersection with MD 658 (Vocke Road/Campground Road) in La Vale. Vocke Road, the south leg of the intersection, leads to an entrance ramp to I-68 east. Campground Road, the north leg, leads to an entrance ramp to I-68 west via US 40 Alternate. The west leg of the intersection is an exit ramp from Exit 40 of westbound I-68. MD 49 heads east as a two-lane undivided road through a residential area, then enters a forested area and begins to ascend Haystack Mountain. The state highway officially ends at Sunset Drive just before the top of the climb, where the highway enters the city of Cumberland. However, the highway continues to be signed as MD 49.

MD 49 remains level until the descent of Haystack Mountain starts just before the intersection with Seton Drive, which leads to Bishop Walsh School and the site of Sacred Heart Hospital, which closed in 2009. The south leg of the intersection is an exit ramp from Exit 41 of westbound I-68. East of Seton Drive, MD 49 enters another residential area. At the bottom of the hill, the highway meets its eastern terminus at a five-way intersection, known as The Dingle, with north–south Fayette Street and Greene Street, the old alignment of US 220 that the highway meets at an oblique angle.

== History ==
Braddock Road is the modern descendant of the original military trail cleared by the forces of Edward Braddock in 1755 as part of his unsuccessful campaign to capture Fort Duquesne. The Braddock Road was repurposed in 1811 as the original route of the National Road over Haystack Mountain. The National Road was moved to the longer but less steep route through the Cumberland Narrows in 1833. The Braddock Road was considered to have begun at its intersection with Greene Street, a junction that became known as The Dingle, named for a residential neighborhood bounded by Greene Street and Braddock Road originally built as a gated community for Celanese executives starting in 1913.

Modern MD 49 was paved from Greene Street to Seton Drive in 1923 and from there to La Vale by 1930. The state highway originally continued west from its present terminus to an intersection with MD 53 just south of MD 53's intersection with US 40. MD 49 was rolled back to its present western terminus in 1972 concurrent with the construction of I-68, which cut off two segments of the original alignment. Those two sections are now parts of MD 949. MD 49 was removed from state maintenance between Greene Street and Seton Drive around 1989. The section between Seton Drive and Sunset Drive was returned to local maintenance around 1993, concurrent with the expansion of Cumberland city limits in the area.

== Junction list ==
The entire route is in Allegany County.

Location	mi	km	Destinations	Notes
La Vale	0.00	0.00	MD 658 (Vocke Road/Campground Road) to I-68 / US 40 – La Vale	Western terminus; west leg of intersection is Exit 40 ramp from I-68 west
La Vale	1.02	1.64	Sunset Drive	Official eastern terminus according to MDSHA
Cumberland	1.7	2.7	Seton Drive north	South leg of intersection is Exit 41 ramp from I-68 west
Cumberland	2.7	4.3	Greene Street / Fayette Street	Signed eastern terminus; Greene Street is old alignment of US 220
1.000 mi = 1.609 km; 1.000 km = 0.621 mi
