= Maryland Route 53 =

State highway in Allegany County, Maryland, US, known as Winchester Rd

Maryland Route 53
- Winchester Road
- Maryland Route 53 highlighted in red

Route information
- Maintained by MDSHA
- Length: 3.33 mi (5.36 km)
- Existed: 1927–present

Major junctions
- South end: US 220 in Cresaptown
- MD 658 in La Vale; I-68 / US 40 in La Vale
- North end: US 40 Alt. in La Vale

Location
- Country: United States
- State: Maryland
- Counties: Allegany

Highway system
- Maryland highway system; Interstate; US; State; Scenic Byways
| ← MD 51 | → MD 54 |

Maryland Route 53 (MD 53) is a state highway in the U.S. state of Maryland. Known as Winchester Road, the state highway runs 3.33 miles (5.36 km) from U.S. Route 220 (US 220) in Cresaptown north to US 40 Alternate in La Vale. MD 53 is the northernmost part of the Winchester Road, a colonial era road between Cumberland and Winchester, Virginia. The modern MD 53 was constructed in the mid-1920s and updated in the 1950s.

== Route description ==
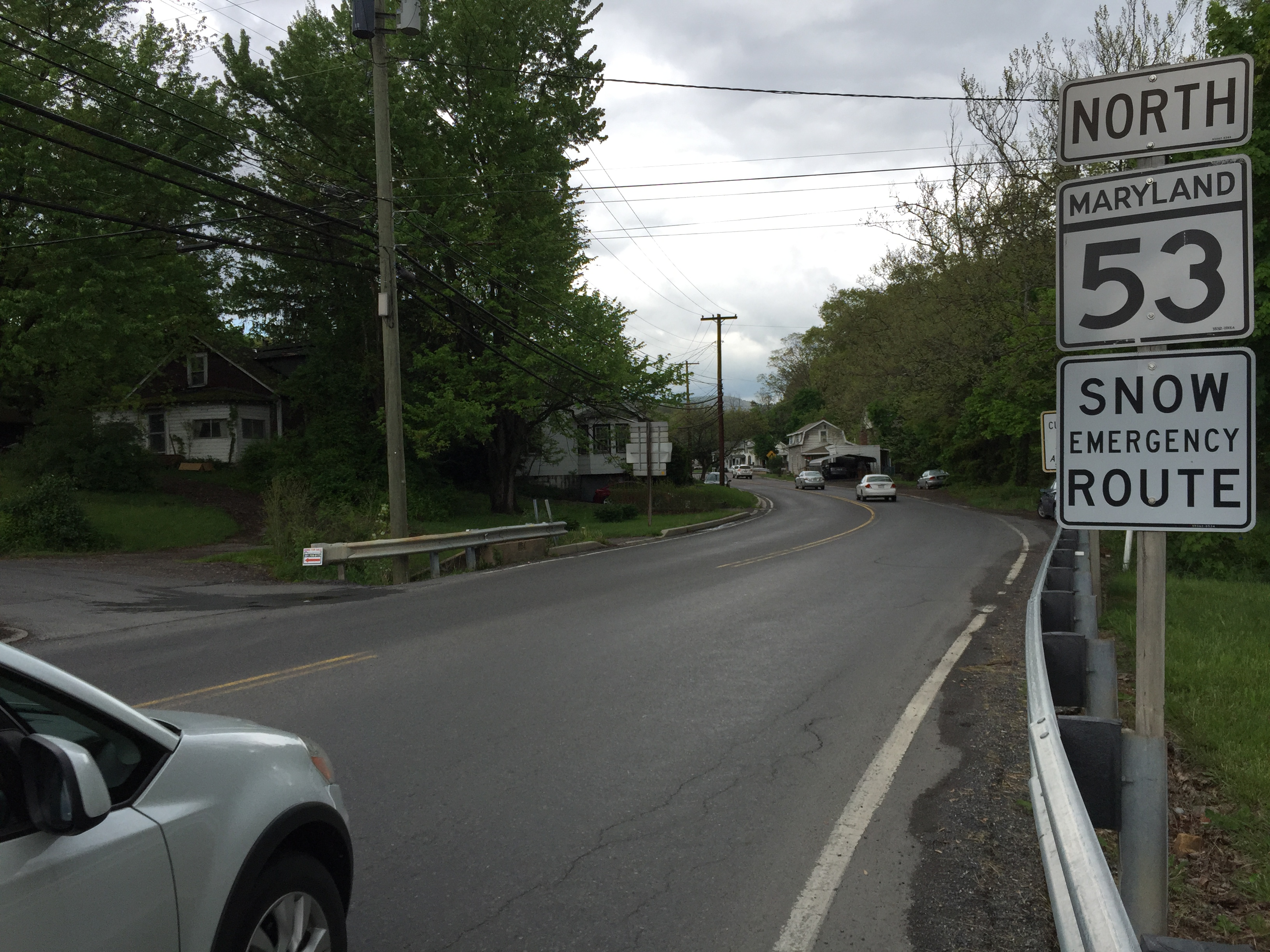
View north along MD 53 in Cresaptown

MD 53 begins at an intersection with US 220 (McMullen Highway) in Cresaptown. Winchester Road continues south as a county-maintained highway toward Pinto. MD 53 begins as a one-way street headed southbound. The state highway becomes two-way at its intersection with Brant Road, which joins the one-way street southbound. MD 53 receives northbound traffic from US 220 via MD 636 (Warrior Drive). Southbound traffic approaching the intersection of MD 53 and MD 636 may use either state highway to access both directions of US 220. MD 53 continues north from MD 636 as a two-lane undivided road that crosses Warrior Run. MD 53 continues north along the western flank of Haystack Mountain, crossing Winchester Run a few times and intersecting both ends of MD 951 (Vine Street), the old alignment of MD 53. The state highway expands to a four-lane divided highway as it passes to the west of Country Club Mall. After an intersection with MD 658 (Vocke Road), MD 53 turns northwest and passes under Interstate 68 (I-68, National Freeway), with the only direct access an entrance to eastbound I-68. The state highway then meets its northern terminus at an intersection with US 40 Alternate in La Vale. Access to westbound I-68 is provided a short distance to the east on US 40 Alternate.

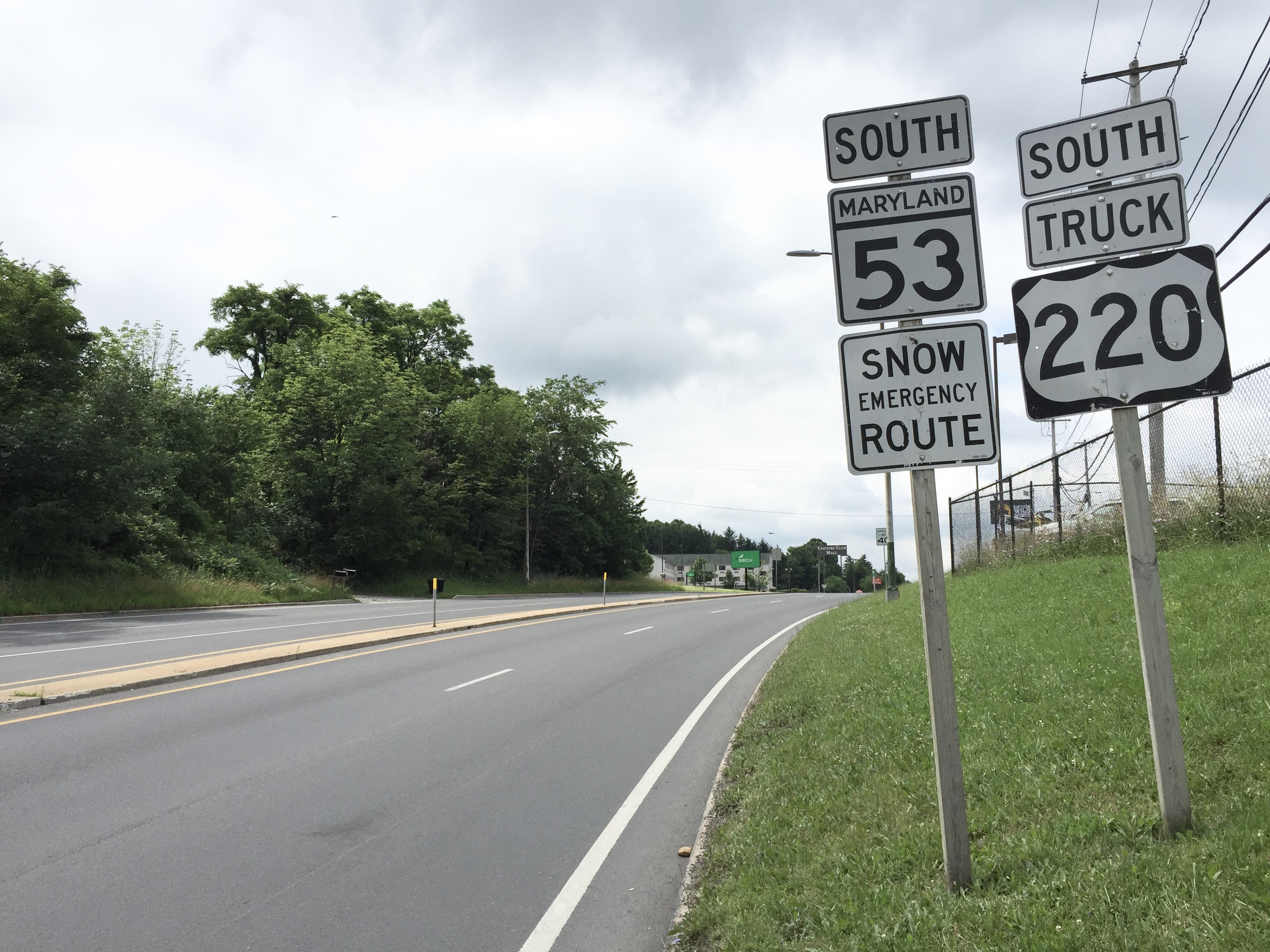
View south along MD 53 and US 220 Truck at MD 658 in Winchester

MD 53 is part of US 220 Truck, which provides access from I-68 west of La Vale to southbound US 220 for trucks due to a truck prohibition on the eastbound exit ramp for I-68's interchange with US 220. The state highway is part of the main National Highway System from US 220 to I-68; in addition, the portion from I-68 to US 40 Alternate is a National Highway System principal arterial.

== History ==
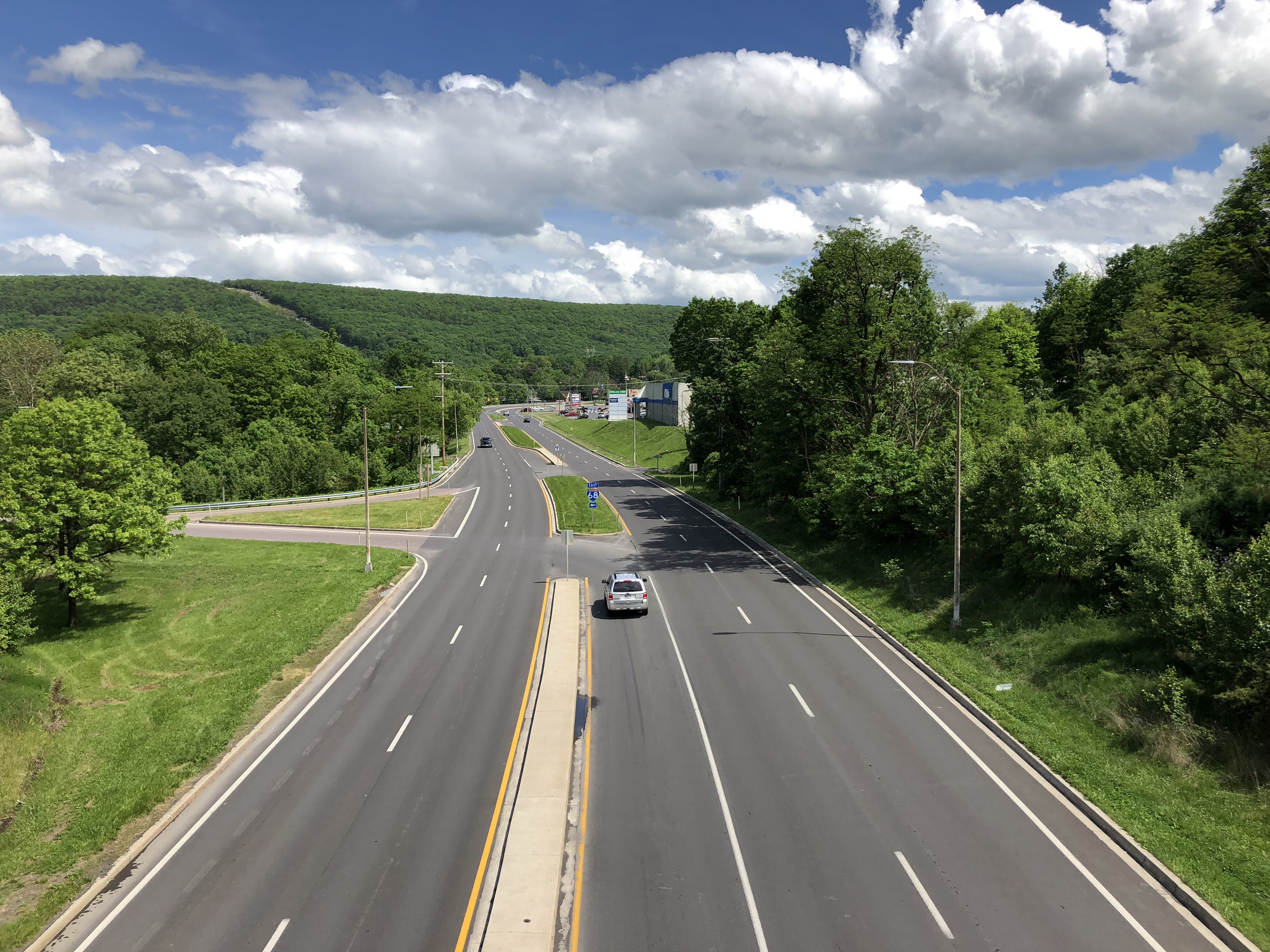
MD 53 southbound viewed from I-68/US 40 in Winchester

The Winchester Road was first laid out in the 18th century as the route from Cumberland to Winchester, Virginia. The route headed south from near the present intersection of US 40 Alternate and MD 53 to Cresaptown, continued south to a crossing of the Potomac River at Pinto, crossed Knobly Mountain to reach the path of West Virginia Route 28, which it followed to Romney, then followed the path of US 50 east to Winchester. Winchester Road south of Cresaptown was never a state highway, but it was upgraded as a military access road to the United States Army's Allegany Ordnance Plant (now the Allegany Ballistics Laboratory) in West Virginia on the opposite side of the Potomac River from Pinto during World War II. The county highway remained the primary access point to the laboratory from Maryland until the construction of MD 956 in 1967.

The modern MD 53 was constructed between 1924 and 1926. MD 53 was rebuilt between 1953 and 1956, bypassing the alignment that is now MD 951. It is not clear when the southernmost portion of MD 53 became one-way southbound. MD 53 was expanded to a divided highway from just south of MD 658 north to US 40 Alternate in 1972 in conjunction with the construction of I-68 through La Vale.

== Junction list ==
The entire route is in Allegany County.

| Location | mi | km | Destinations | Notes |
|---|---|---|---|---|
| Cresaptown | 0.00 | 0.00 | US 220 (McMullen Highway) – Cumberland, McCoole | Southern terminus; southern end of one-way street southbound |
| Cresaptown | 0.09 | 0.14 | Brant Road west | Northern end of one-way street southbound; southbound entrance only |
| Cresaptown | 0.21 | 0.34 | MD 636 east (Warrior Drive) | Western terminus of MD 636; northbound traffic from US 220 joins from MD 636 |
| La Vale | 2.70 | 4.35 | MD 658 north (Vocke Road) – La Vale | Southern terminus of MD 658; US 220 Truck joins southbound from MD 658 |
| La Vale | 3.14 | 5.05 | I-68 east / US 40 east (National Freeway) – Cumberland, Hancock | Entrance to eastbound I-68 only |
| La Vale | 3.33 | 5.36 | US 40 Alt. (National Pike) to I-68 west / US 40 west (National Freeway) – La Vale, Frostburg | Northern terminus |
1.000 mi = 1.609 km; 1.000 km = 0.621 mi: Concurrency terminus; Incomplete access
