= U.S. Route 220 in Maryland =

Highway in Maryland

U.S. Route 220
- US 220 highlighted in red

Route information
- Maintained by MDSHA
- Length: 27.30 mi (43.94 km)
- Existed: 1926–present

Major junctions
- South end: US 220 at West Virginia border in McCoole
- MD 135 in McCoole; MD 956 in Pinto; MD 53 in Cresaptown; I-68 / US 40 in Cumberland; MD 51 in Cumberland; US 40 Alt. in Cumberland; I-68 / US 40 / MD 144 in Cumberland
- North end: US 220 at Pennsylvania border in Dickens

Location
- Country: United States
- State: Maryland
- Counties: Allegany

Highway system
- United States Numbered Highway System; List; Special; Divided; Maryland highway system; Interstate; US; State; Scenic Byways
← MD 219	→ MD 221

U.S. Route 220 (US 220) is a part of the U.S. Highway System that runs from Rockingham, North Carolina, to South Waverly, Pennsylvania. In Maryland, the federal highway runs 27.30 miles (43.94 km) from the West Virginia state line at the North Branch Potomac River in McCoole north to the Pennsylvania state line in Dickens. Known as McMullen Highway for much of its length in Maryland, US 220 is the primary north–south route in central Allegany County, connecting Cumberland with its southern suburbs and Keyser, West Virginia, to the south and Bedford, Pennsylvania, to the north. The federal highway is part of the National Highway System between the West Virginia state line and Maryland Route 53 (MD 53) in Cresaptown and between Interstate 68 (I-68), with which it is concurrent through Cumberland, and the Pennsylvania state line.

The road to Bedford was paved within the city of Cumberland by 1910 and constructed north to Pennsylvania in the 1910s. This highway comprised the southernmost portion of US 220 when the U.S. Highway System was established in 1927. McMullen Highway was constructed starting from Cumberland and finishing in McCoole in the 1920s. When that highway was completed around 1930, US 220 was extended south into West Virginia. Both the northern and southern portions of the federal highway were reconstructed in the 1940s and 1950s, including a new bridge over the North Branch Potomac River. US 220 was rerouted within Cumberland multiple times before being placed on I-68 in the early 1980s to bypass downtown Cumberland. The bypass of Bedford Road between I-68 and the Pennsylvania state line opened in 2000. A new bridge over the North Branch Potomac River was completed in 2013. In addition, relocation of the highway from I-68 south into West Virginia is under consideration.

== Route description ==
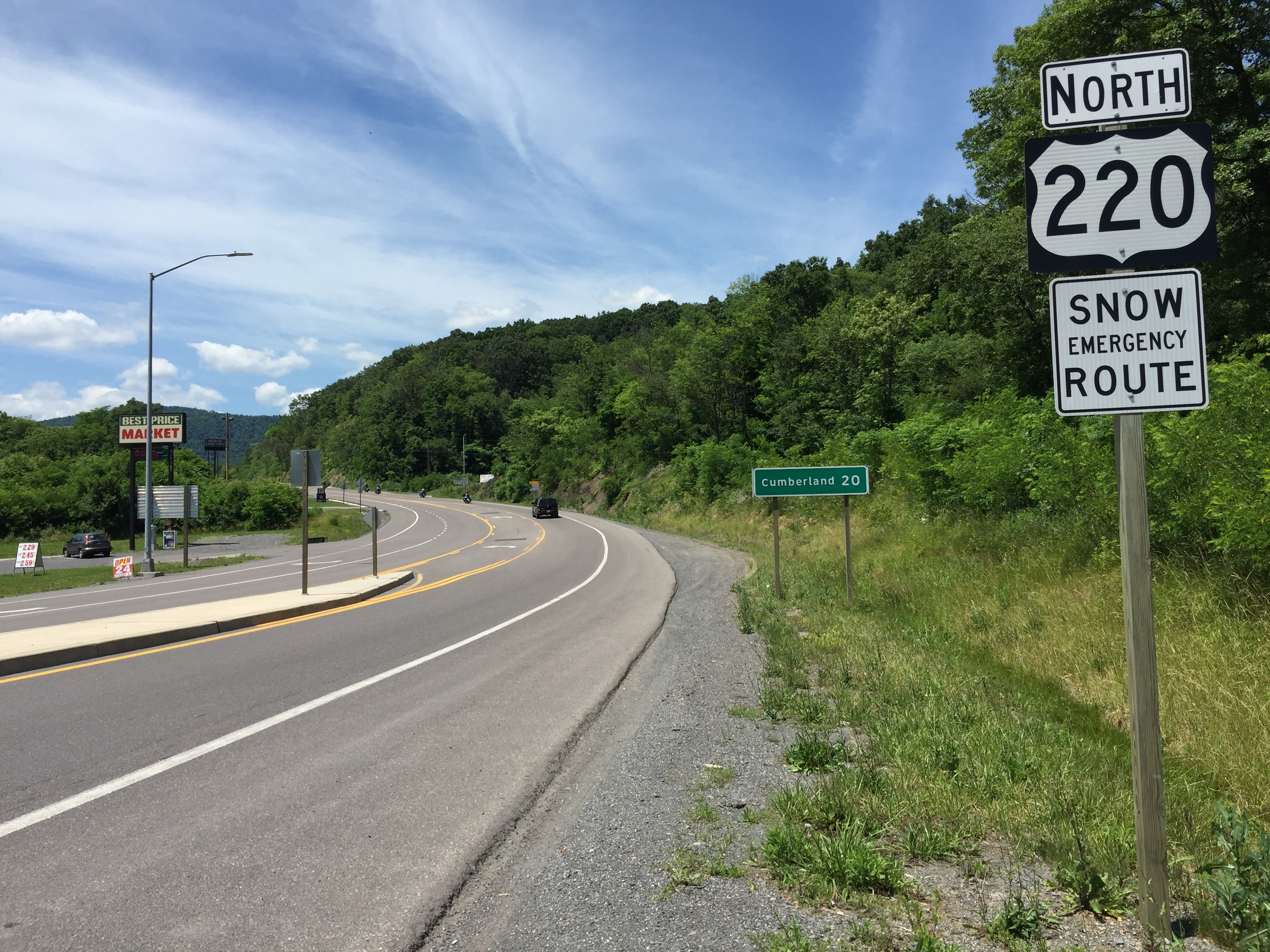
US 220 northbound entering Maryland

US 220 enters Maryland in southwestern Allegany County, crossing the North Branch Potomac River and its own old alignment on a bridge from Keyser to McCoole. The highway meets the eastern terminus of MD 135 (Paxton Street) before gaining a climbing lane and ascending a hill. US 220 crosses over its old alignment again, then meets the old alignment, unsigned MD 135A, at the top of the hill. The federal highway turns northeast as McMullen Highway, a two-lane undivided road paralleling the North Branch Potomac River north to Cumberland. The highway passes through the hamlet of Dawson, where it passes a curve of its old alignment designated MD 830A and closely parallels CSX's Mountain Subdivision. US 220 splits away from the railroad tracks to follow the valley of Deep Hollow Creek between Fort Hill immediately to the east and Dans Mountain further to the west. After passing through the hamlet of Danville, the federal highway passes into the valley of Mill Run. After passing another curve of old alignment designated MD 830B, US 220 leaves Fort Hill and Mill Run behind.

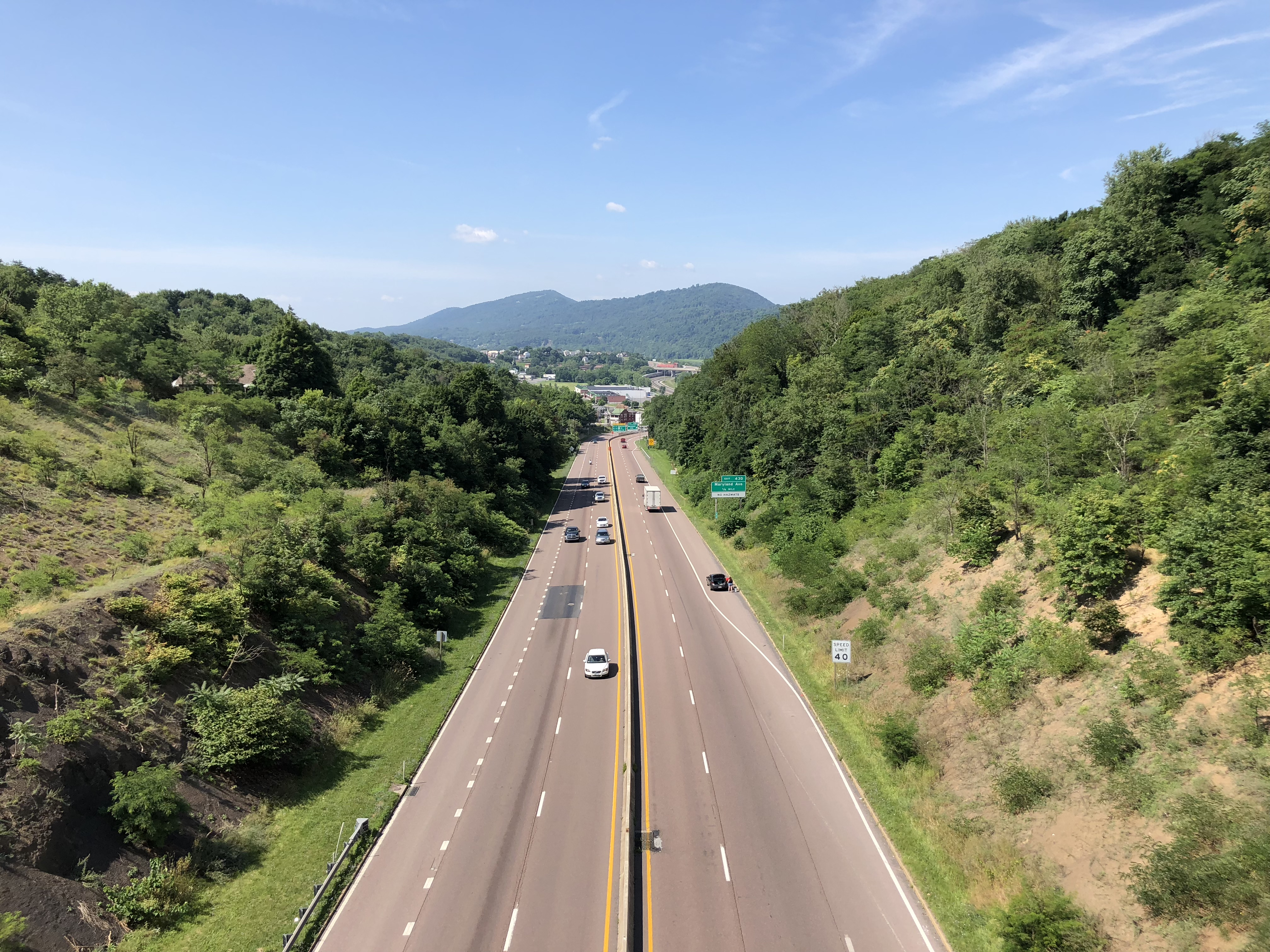
View southwest along I-68/US 40/US 220 in Cumberland

US 220 passes through the villages of Rawlings and Bier before intersecting the western end of MD 956 (Patriot Parkway) near Pinto. Beyond MD 956, US 220 enters a more densely populated area, passing through the community of Bel Air. The federal highway enters Cresaptown, where US 220 intersects MD 53 (Winchester Road), which is also the southern terminus of US 220 Truck. Access to northbound MD 53 is provided by unsigned MD 636 (Warrior Drive) shortly after.

After crossing Warrior Run, Haystack Mountain flanks US 220 to the west as the federal highway passes through Amcelle, the former site of the Celanese chemical plant that is now the location of the North Branch Correctional Institution. The federal highway curves through Potomac Park, home of the Allegany County Fairgrounds. After passing the Upper Potomac Industrial Park, US 220 parallels CSX's Mountain Subdivision again before entering the city of Cumberland, where the highway is municipally-maintained. Shortly after, US 220 passes east of a park and ride lot before it meets I-68 and US 40 (National Freeway) at Exit 42. Trucks and buses are prohibited from using the ramp in the diamond interchange from eastbound I-68 to southbound US 220; those vehicles must follow US 220 Truck instead. Greene Street, the old alignment of US 220, continues north from the interchange as a municipal street toward downtown Cumberland.

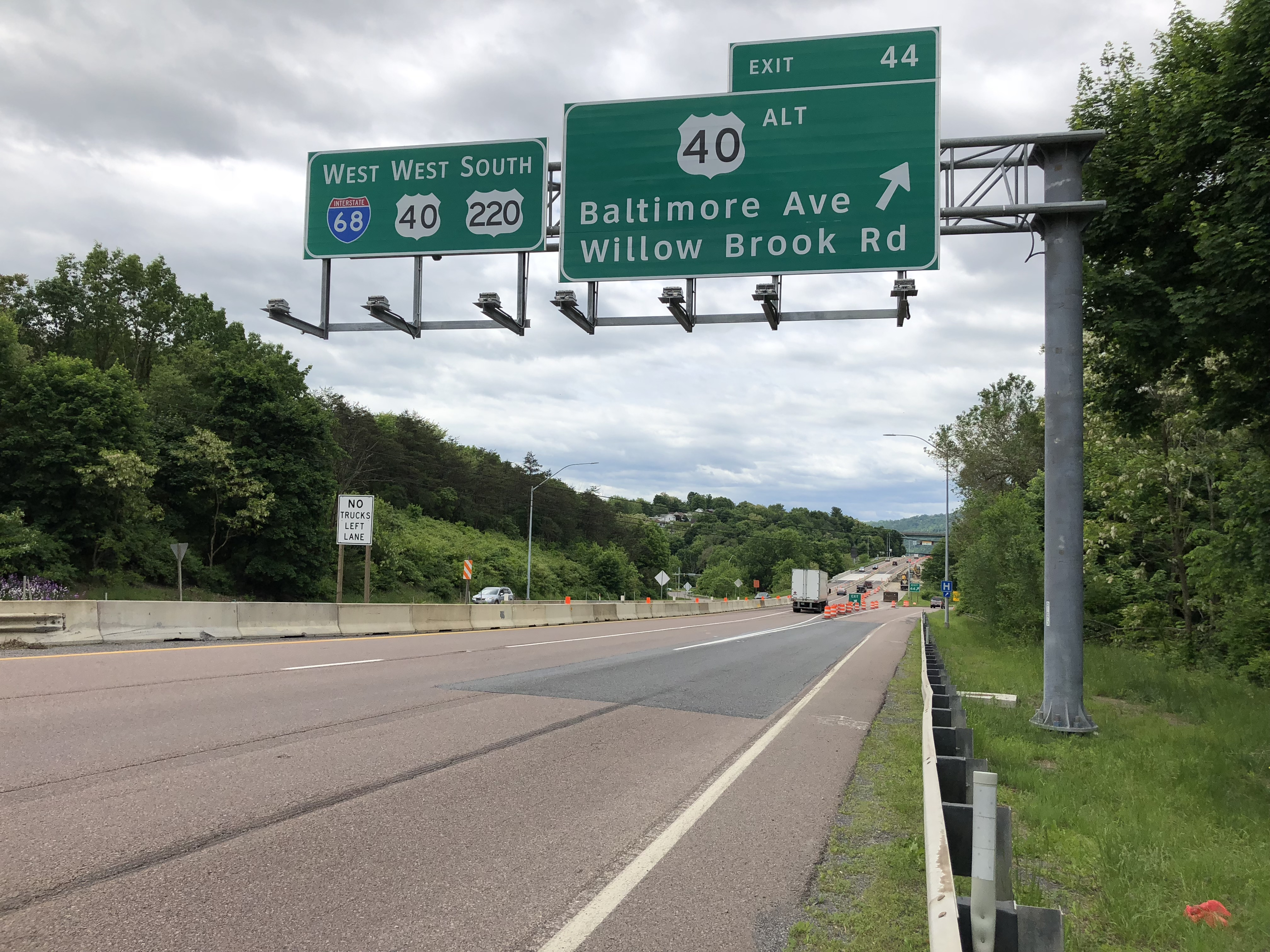
I-68/US 40/US 220 concurrency in Cumberland

US 220 becomes concurrent with eastbound I-68 and US 40 on a four-lane freeway, passing through downtown Cumberland on a narrow, curvaceous viaduct where the highway meets the northern end of MD 51 and the east end of US 40 Alt. at interchanges. After passing through the eastern part of the city, US 220 exits the freeway at Exit 46 onto MD 144 (Ali Ghan Road), which it follows east a short distance before turning north over I-68 onto a two-lane limited access highway with a speed limit of 55 mph (89 km/h). MD 144, the old alignment of US 40, continues east toward Rocky Gap State Park. The southbound direction of US 220 joins westbound I-68 via a long ramp on a sweeping curve. After crossing Evitts Creek, Mason Road, and Bealls Mill Road, the federal highway reaches the intersection with MD 807 (Bedford Road) and MD 807E (Smouses Mill Road) in Dickens, the former being the old alignment of US 220. US 220 turns northeast, passing MD 807D (Pine Ridge Road) and MD 807C before crossing the Pennsylvania state line, where the route continues north as Bedford Valley Road toward Bedford.

== History ==
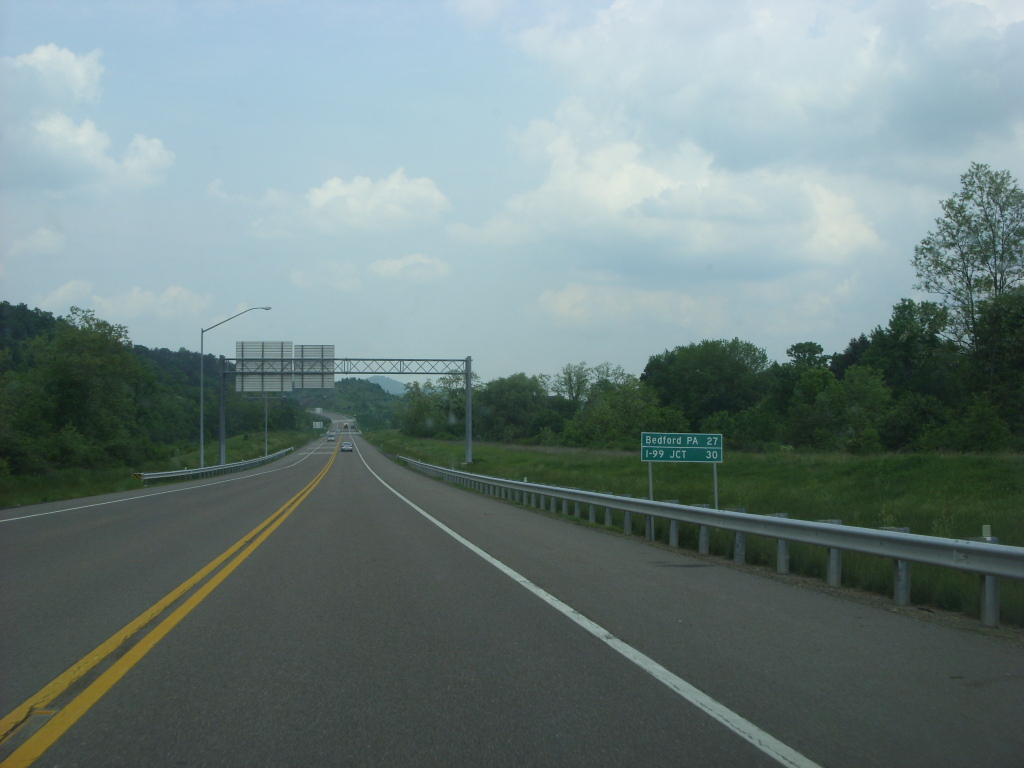
US 220 northbound past the split from I-68/US 40 in Cumberland

Bedford Street was paved in the city of Cumberland from downtown to Naves Cross Road by 1910. Bedford Road was paved between Naves Cross Road and roughly the present intersection of US 220 and Bedford Road by 1915, with the final segment to the Pennsylvania state line completed shortly thereafter. When the U.S. Highway System was organized in 1926, Bedford Road and Bedford Street were designated the southernmost portion of US 220. The first section of McMullen Highway—named for Hugh A. McMullen, an Allegany County miner, merchant, and banker who was Comptroller of Maryland from 1916 to 1920—was completed between Cumberland and Cresaptown in 1920. The highway was extended to Rawlings by 1927 and to Dawson in 1928. McMullen Highway was completed to McCoole by 1930. The US 220 designation was extended south of Cumberland into West Virginia at the same time. Within Cumberland, US 220 followed Greene Street north and east to Wills Creek. The federal highway crossed Wills Creek via Baltimore Street, which the highway followed east to Henderson Avenue. US 220 was concurrent with US 40 on Henderson Avenue before turning northeast onto Bedford Street. In McCoole, US 220 followed a twisty route down to the North Branch Potomac River. The federal highway followed what is today MD 135A to MD 135, then turned east on the present MD 135 and past the present bridge to Parkland Drive, where the highway crossed the river on a bridge in line with Main Street in Keyser.

The first round of improvements to US 220 began around 1936 when the highway was widened from McMullen to Amcelle. The widened highway was extended south through Cresaptown by 1938 and to McCoole by 1942, making all of McMullen Highway at least 20 feet (6.1 m) wide. A second round of widening occurred during World War II as a military access project; the highway was expanded to at least 24 feet (7.3 m) in width from Cumberland to Pinto to improve access to the many wartime manufacturing centers along the highway, including the Allegany Ordnance Plant in West Virginia across the Potomac River from Pinto.

Improvements to US 220 continued after the war. Bedford Road was rebuilt between 1946 and 1950. McMullen Highway from Cumberland to Cresaptown was widened a third time in a project completed in 1950. The present bridge between McCoole and Keyser was completed in 1951, with the approach road on the Maryland side completed in 1952. Reconstruction of US 220 between Cresaptown and Rawlings occurred between 1952 and 1954. The final segment of McMullen Highway to be rebuilt, from Rawlings to McCoole, was completed in 1956.

The first rerouting of US 220 within Cumberland occurred in 1956, when Frederick Street was reconstructed and became the northbound direction of a one-way pair in conjunction with Bedford Street. By 1964, the federal highway followed Mechanic Street north to the Frederick/Bedford pair instead of Henderson Avenue. In 1977, a viaduct was completed to carry US 220 over the railroad tracks and US 40 ALT. US 220 was moved off of surface streets in downtown Cumberland when the highway was placed on the Cumberland Thruway (now I-68) between McMullen Highway and Naves Cross Road in 1982. The highway used Naves Cross Road to reconnect with Bedford Road, which was designated MD 807 between Naves Cross Road and the Cumberland city line. In 2000, the two-lane, limited-access bypass of Bedford Road was completed northeast of Cumberland; MD 807 was extended north along the bypassed part of Bedford Road. The portion of US 220 between the southern city limit of Cumberland and I-68 was transferred from municipal maintenance to state maintenance in 2010.

The 1951 bridge over the North Branch Potomac River between McCoole and Keyser was replaced between 2010 and 2013. The new bridge was constructed immediately east of the original, which was demolished after the new bridge was completed.

== Future ==
A study is underway concerning upgrading or relocating US 220 between I-68 and the North Branch Potomac River. The proposed routing would involve MD 53 between I-68 and Cresaptown, and is part of a larger study of a highway to connect Cumberland with Corridor H near Scherr, West Virginia.

== Junction list ==
The entire route is in Allegany County.

Location	mi	km	Exit	Destinations	Notes
McCoole	0.00	0.00		US 220 south (Mineral Street) – Keyser	West Virginia state line at North Branch Potomac River; southern terminus of US 220 in Maryland
McCoole	0.42	0.68		MD 135 (Paxton Street) – Westernport, Oakland	Officially MD 135B
McCoole	1.30	2.09		To MD 135	Unsigned MD 135A; old alignment of US 220
Pinto	11.73	18.88		MD 956 east (Patriot Parkway) – Rocket Center, WV	Western terminus of MD 956
Cresaptown	13.98	22.50		Winchester Road south – Pinto	Southbound MD 53 and US 220 Truck end at this intersection; no access to northbound MD 53
Cresaptown	14.28	22.98		MD 636 west (Warrior Drive) to MD 53 north (Winchester Road) – La Vale	Eastern terminus of MD 636
Cumberland	18.81	30.27	42	I-68 west / US 40 west (National Freeway) / Greene Street north – Frostburg, Morgantown	South end of concurrency with I-68 / US 40; US 220 uses I-68 exit numbers; Greene Street is old alignment of US 220
Cumberland	20.08	32.32	43A	Johnson Street – Ridgeley, WV	Eastbound exit and entrance
Cumberland	20.08	32.32	43A	Beall Street – Ridgeley, WV	No eastbound exit
Cumberland	20.37	32.78	43B	MD 51 (Industrial Boulevard) – Greater Cumberland Regional Airport	Western terminus of MD 51
Cumberland	20.39	32.81	43C	Downtown Cumberland	
Cumberland	20.71	33.33	43D	Maryland Avenue	
Cumberland	21.34	34.34	44	US 40 Alt. west (Baltimore Avenue) / MD 639 south (Willowbrook Road)	Eastern terminus of US 40 Alt.
Cumberland	22.26	35.82	45	MD 952 (Hillcrest Drive)	
Cumberland	22.96	36.95	46	MD 144 (Naves Cross Road)	Westbound exit and entrance
Cumberland	23.53	37.87	47	I-68 east (National Freeway) / US 40 east / MD 144 (Ali Ghan Road) – Hancock, Hagerstown	North end of concurrency with I-68 / US 40; signed as Exit 46 on eastbound I-68
Dickens	26.67	42.92		MD 807 south (Bedford Road) / Smouses Mill Road east – Cumberland	Northern terminus of MD 807; MD 807 is old alignment of US 220; Smouses Mill Road is unsigned MD 807E
Dickens	27.30	43.94		US 220 north (Bedford Valley Road) – Bedford	Pennsylvania state line; northern terminus of US 220 in Maryland
1.000 mi = 1.609 km; 1.000 km = 0.621 mi: Concurrency terminus; Incomplete access

== See also ==
U.S. Route 220
Previous state: West Virginia	Maryland	Next state: Pennsylvania
