= U.S. Route 40 Alternate (Keysers Ridge–Cumberland, Maryland) =

Highway in Garrett and Allegany counties in Maryland

U.S. Route 40 Alternate
- Alt. US 40 highlighted in red

Route information
- Auxiliary route of US 40
- Maintained by MDSHA
- Length: 31.80 mi (51.18 km)
- Existed: Early 1980s–present
- Tourist routes: Historic National Road; Mountain Maryland Scenic Byway

Major junctions
- West end: US 40 in Keysers Ridge
- MD 495 in Grantsville; US 219 Bus. near Grantsville; MD 36 in Frostburg
- East end: I-68 / US 40 / US 220 in Cumberland

Location
- Country: United States
- State: Maryland
- Counties: Garrett, Allegany

Highway system
- United States Numbered Highway System; List; Special; Divided; Maryland highway system; Interstate; US; State; Scenic Byways

U.S. Route 40 Alternate (Alt US 40) is the U.S. Highway designation for a former segment of U.S. Route 40 (US 40) through Garrett and Allegany counties in Maryland. The highway begins at US 40 near exit 14 on Interstate 68 (I-68) and runs 31.80 miles (51.18 km) eastward to Cumberland, where it ends at exit 44 on I-68. Alt US 40 is maintained by the Maryland State Highway Administration (MDSHA).

The highway is known as National Pike because it follows the original alignment of the historic National Road. As a result, there are many historic sites along Alt US 40, including the Casselman Bridge in Grantsville and the last remaining National Road toll gate house in Maryland, located in LaVale.

When the National Freeway was built in western Maryland paralleling the old National Road, parts of US 40 were bypassed. The part of the bypassed road between Keyser's Ridge and Cumberland became Alt US 40, and other bypassed sections east of Cumberland became Maryland Route 144 (MD 144) and U.S. Route 40 Scenic. Although Alt US 40 has diminished in importance from its original status as the National Road with the construction of I-68, it remains an important route for local traffic and serves as the Main Streets of Grantsville and Frostburg.

== Route description ==
Alt US 40 runs from Keyser's Ridge to Cumberland, following part of the route of the National Road through some of Maryland's most mountainous terrain in Garrett and Allegany counties. The highway is a part of the National Highway System as a principal arterial from the eastern junction with MD 36 in Frostburg to the intersection of Mechanic Street and Henderson Avenue in Cumberland.

=== Garrett County ===
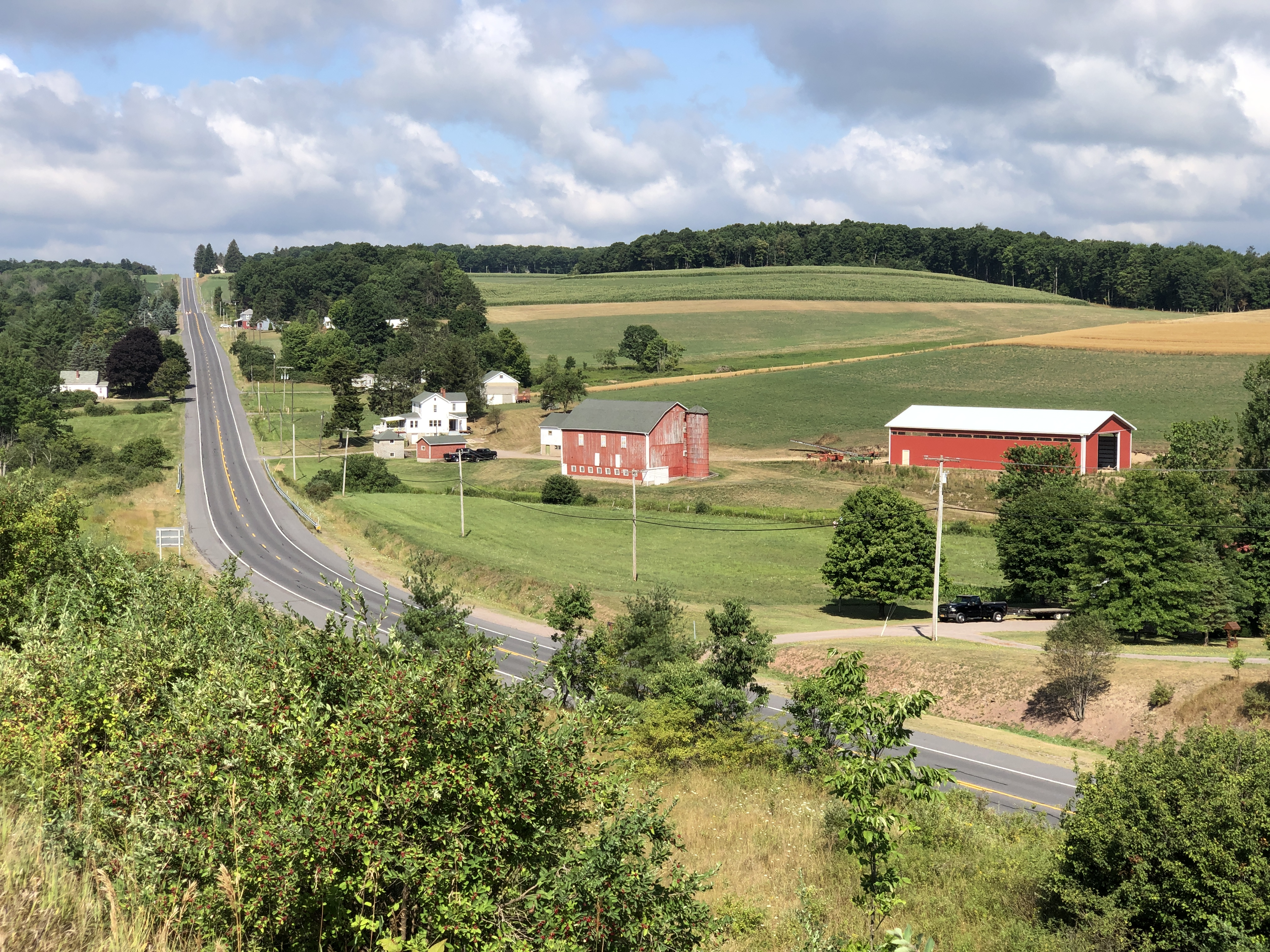
US 40 Alt westbound just west of MD 546 near Finzel

Alt US 40 branches from US 40 near exit 14 on I-68 at Keysers Ridge. It runs parallel to I-68 through northern Garrett County as a two-lane road with truck lanes on some uphill sections. The annual average daily traffic (AADT)—that is, the number of cars that use the road per day, averaged over the course of one year—is 1,831 at the western end of Alt US 40. For comparison, the parallel section of I-68 has an AADT of 14,271. Alt US 40 passes through some of the most mountainous terrain in Maryland. The route runs perpendicular to the mountain ridges in Garrett County, and as a result much of the section of the road in Garrett County runs uphill or downhill. The first mountain encountered by the highway east of Keysers Ridge is Negro Mountain. The road passes over the mountain at an elevation of 3,075 feet (937 m), which is the highest point on Alt US 40, and was also the highest point along the National Road. East of Negro Mountain, the highway enters Grantsville, where traffic increases, with the AADT increasing to 3,711, the highest traffic density on Alt US 40 in Garrett County. In Grantsville, Alt US 40 meets MD 669, which connects with Pennsylvania Route 669 toward Salisbury, Pennsylvania. A short distance east of this intersection, the highway meets MD 495, which junctions with I-68 and continues southward toward Oakland. East of Grantsville, Alt US 40 passes over the Casselman River on a steel bridge built in 1933. Downstream from this bridge is the Casselman River Bridge State Park, centered on the stone arch bridge which originally carried the National Road over the Casselman River.

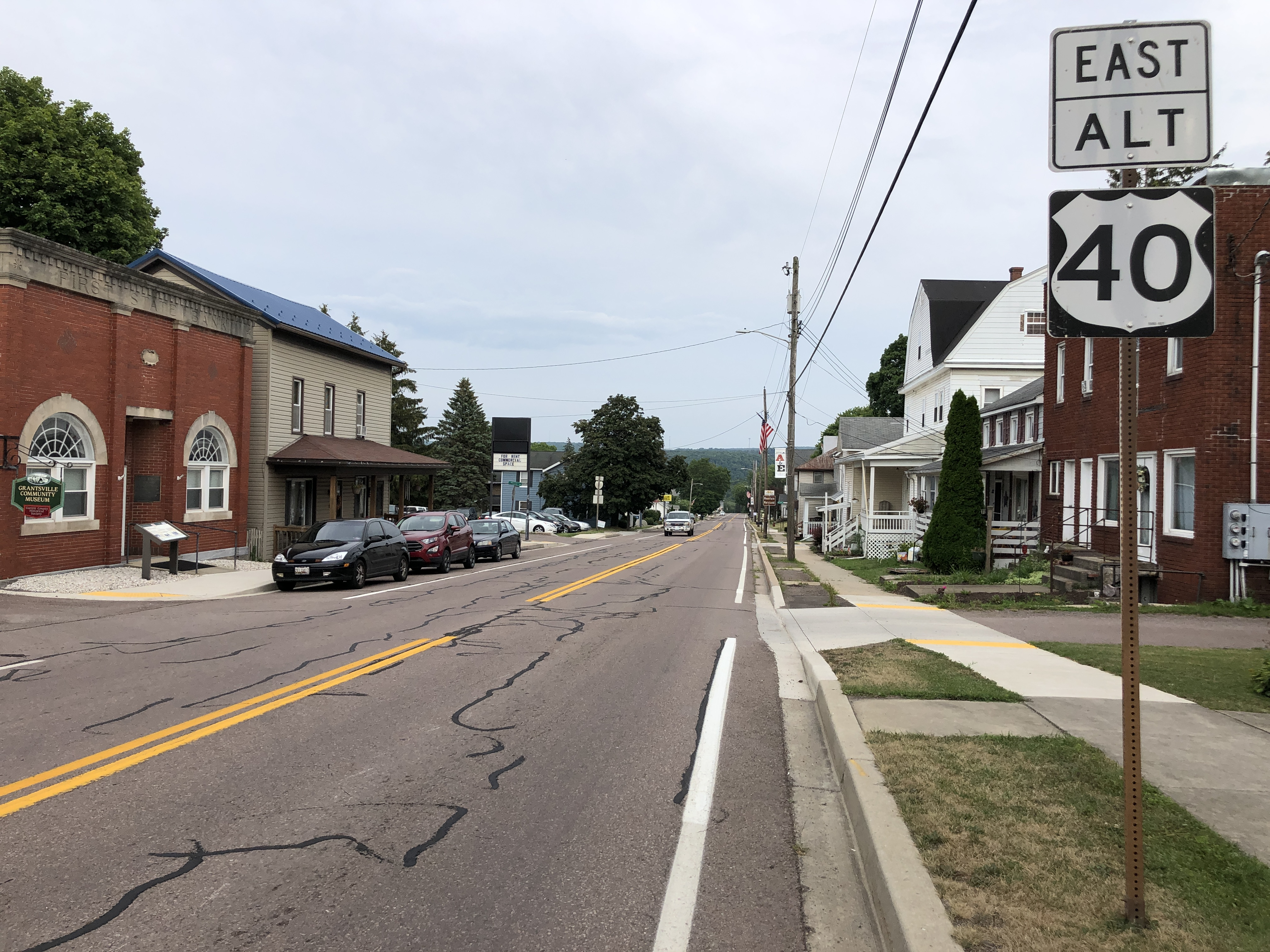
US 40 Alt eastbound past MD 495 in Grantsville

Continuing eastward from Grantsville, Alt US 40 intersects US 219 Bus. a short distance north of exit 22 on I-68, before passing under the US 219 freeway. East of this intersection, traffic decreases, with an AADT of 1,681, the lowest traffic density along the entire route. The US 219 Bus. intersection is at the top of a hill known as Chestnut Ridge.

East of Chestnut Ridge, the highway passes over Meadow Mountain at a height of 2,789 feet (850 m). In eastern Garrett County, traffic on the route gradually increases to an AADT of 2,232. Alt US 40 passes under MD 546, which runs north from I-68, through Finzel, to the Pennsylvania border. Although Alt US 40 does not directly intersect MD 546, it is connected to MD 546 by way of access road MD 546F, and also by MD 946, which intersects Alt US 40 near the top of Little Savage Mountain. Just east, the route crosses the larger Big Savage Mountain at an elevation of 2,847 feet (868 m) before entering Allegany County.

=== Allegany County ===
After continuing into Allegany County, Alt US 40 descends Savage Mountain into Frostburg, where it passes through the town as Main Street. Main Street in Frostburg has the highest traffic density on the route, with an AADT of 15,022. For comparison, the parallel section of I-68 between exits 33 and 34 has an AADT of 20,931. In west Frostburg, the highway intersects MD 36, which then follows the same road as Alt US 40 for about a mile, separating from Alt US 40 in east Frostburg. In central Frostburg, Main Street intersects MD 936, an old alignment of MD 36. Continuing eastward from Frostburg, traffic density decreases, to an AADT of 13,585 at the MD 55 intersection, staying between 13,000 and 15,000 for the remainder of the highway. Alt US 40 passes through Eckhart Mines, where it intersects MD 638, which connects with MD 36 north of Frostburg. In the eastern part of Eckhart Mines, the highway intersects MD 743, which is an old alignment of US 40 which was bypassed by the roadway which became Alt US 40.

Alt US 40 passing through the Narrows in Cumberland

East of Eckhart Mines, Alt US 40 passes through Clarysville, where it intersects MD 55. It is near Clarysville that the terrain followed by Alt US 40 changes: from Clarysville westward to the summit of Savage Mountain, the road runs uphill, while east of Clarysville, the road follows valleys, first following the valley around Braddock Run to Cumberland, and then following the valley around Wills Creek into Cumberland. Near the MD 55 intersection is a stone arch bridge which was initially built in 1812 and rebuilt in the 1830s, and carried the National Road over Braddock Run, a tributary to Wills Creek. East of Clarysville, the highway passes through a gap carved by Braddock Run between Piney Mountain and Dan's Mountain. I-68, having been built later, is located on the hillside above Alt US 40, on the Dan's Mountain side of the gap. Alt US 40 then descends Red Hill into LaVale. At the bottom of Red Hill is the La Vale toll gate house. Built in 1836, tolls were collected there until the early 1900s, and it is the last original National Road toll gate house standing in Maryland. In LaVale, the route intersects MD 53, which serves as a truck bypass for US 220 to Cresaptown. Alt US 40 interchanges with westbound I-68 at exit 39, but eastbound access is only available via MD 53 and MD 658, which intersects Alt US 40 east of the exit 39 interchange. The highway expands to a four-lane road near its intersection with MD 53, then narrows to a two-lane road near its intersection with MD 658. East of the intersection with MD 658, Alt US 40 turns northward, passing through LaVale toward the Narrows, bypassing Haystack Mountain to the north, as opposed to I-68, which passes directly over Haystack Mountain, paralleling Braddock Road (MD 49).

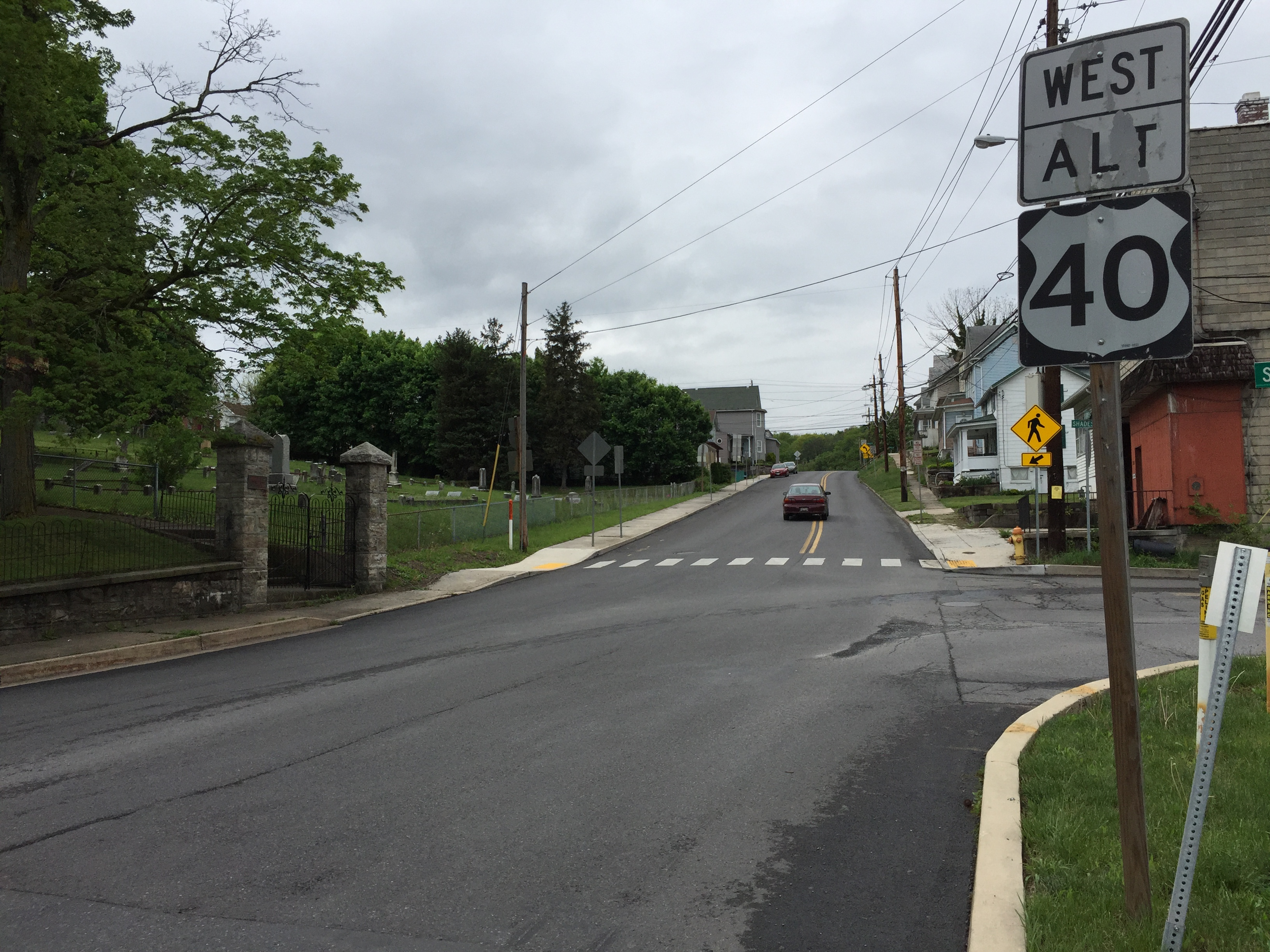
View west from the east end of US 40 Alt. at I-68/US 40/US 220 in Cumberland

Northeast of LaVale, Alt US 40 intersects MD 36 at the northern terminus of MD 36. Alt US 40 then passes through the Narrows, a gap between Haystack Mountain and Wills Mountain carved by Wills Creek, into Cumberland, where it follows Henderson Avenue and Baltimore Avenue to exit 44 on I-68, where Alt US 40 ends. The roadway continues eastward as MD 639.

== History ==
The roadway which became Alt US 40 in Garrett and Allegany counties is, with some realignments, the route followed by the National Road through western Maryland. Various historic sites associated with the National Road can be found along Alt US 40, including a toll-gate house (La Vale Tollgate House) and mile-marker in LaVale. The toll-gate house in LaVale is the last remaining toll-gate house on the National Road in Maryland. Several historic bridges from the National Road, since bypassed by newer bridges, are still present along the route of Alt US 40, including the Casselman Bridge over the Casselman River in Grantsville and a bridge in Clarysville.

=== Braddock Road and the National Road ===
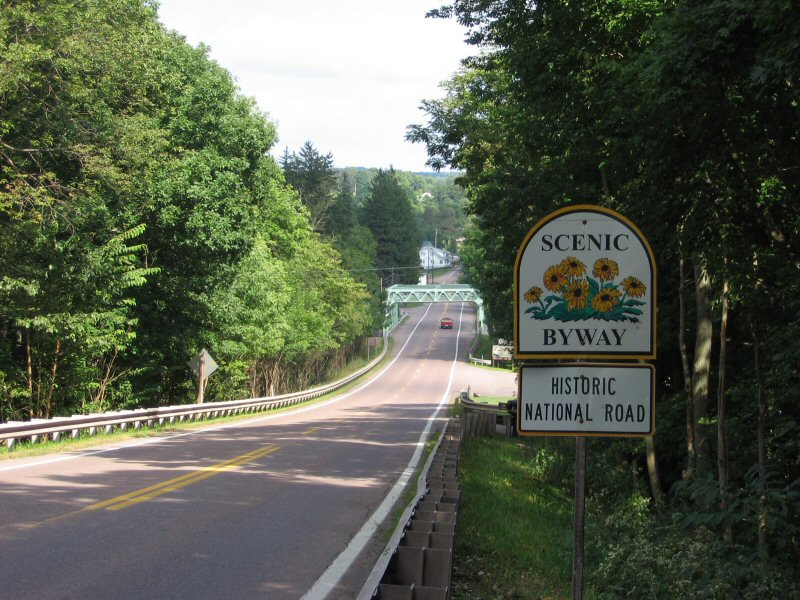
Alt US 40 in Garrett County

In 1755, during the French and Indian War, British troops under the command of General Edward Braddock completed the arduous task of building a road westward from Fort Cumberland. They largely followed an Indian trail known as Nemacolin's Path, expanding it to a 12-foot-wide (3.7 m) road using only hand tools. The road construction was part of the Braddock Expedition, which was the British campaign to seize Fort Duquesne from the French and Indian forces. Although the military expedition was a failure, the road continued to be used afterwards. However, with little maintenance being done on the road, it decayed over time until by the early nineteenth century little remained of the road. The route followed by Alt US 40 today is very similar to the route followed by Braddock's Road, with the exceptions of various realignments that have been done to the road over the years. For example, Braddock's Road crossed directly over Haystack Mountain west of Cumberland rather than following the Cumberland Narrows as later roads did.

The National Road, the first road funded by the U.S. federal government, was authorized by the United States Congress in 1806, and ran from Cumberland, Maryland, to Vandalia, Illinois. Construction started in 1811, and by 1837 the road reached Vandalia. Many sites from the National Road remain along Alt US 40, in particular the LaVale toll gate house, built in 1836. Following the completion of the National Road in 1837, the federal government ceded the road to the states to operate as a toll road, and toll gate houses such as the one in LaVale were built along its path in preparation for the transfer. Tolls continued to be collected along the National Road at the LaVale toll house until the late nineteenth century. The LaVale toll house is the first of its kind to be built along the National Road, and it is the last standing toll house along the National Road in Maryland. The LaVale toll house was listed on the National Register of Historic Places in 1977.

=== Realignments ===
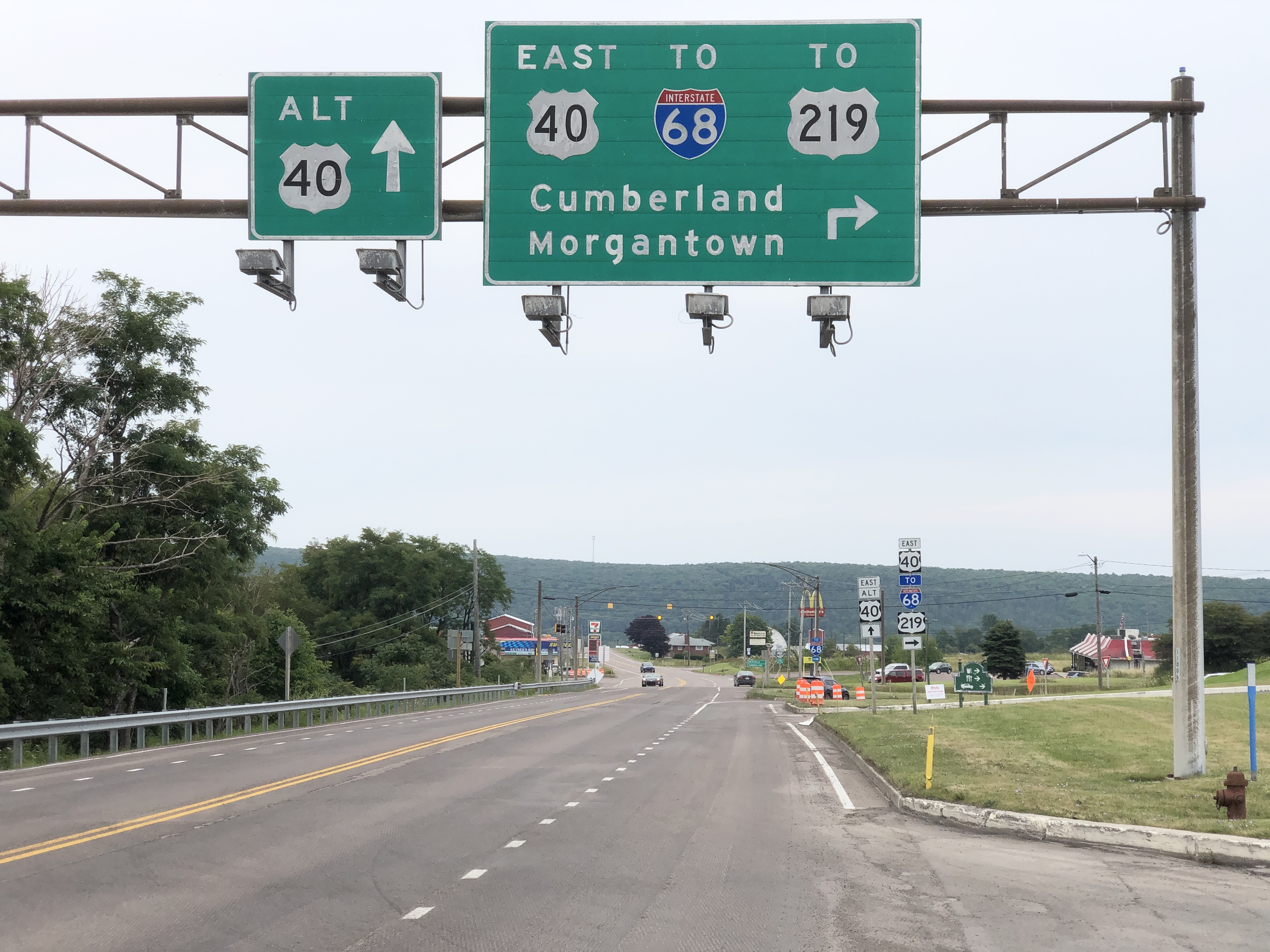
The western end of US 40 Alt at US 40 in Keysers Ridge

Multiple realignments of the road that is now Alt US 40 have occurred since it was originally built as the National Road. Most such realignments are minor, such as to bypass an old bridge, but some have significantly affected the path of the road. One such realignment occurred in 1834, when a new route for the National Road was built through the Cumberland Narrows. The previous route had followed the Braddock Road, a route which is now followed by MD 49. The route following Braddock Road passed over Haystack Mountain and was much steeper than the newer route through the Narrows. The route through the Narrows allowed the road to bypass this steep mountain ascent. The stone arch bridge built across Will's Creek for the new alignment remained in service until 1932, when a new bridge which is the present bridge across Will's Creek replaced it. The old bridge was torn down during the construction of the Will's Creek flood control system in the 1950s.

Another realignment of Alt US 40 occurred in Eckhart Mines, where in 1969 the road, then designated as US 40, was realigned to the north, bypassing the section of the highway through Eckhart Mines, which has a lower speed limit and sharp curves. The speed limit on the old alignment is 25 miles per hour (40 km/h), and the new alignment has a speed limit of 50 miles per hour (80 km/h) along most of the bypass. The new alignment intersects the old alignment, designated as MD 743, on the east end between MD 638 and MD 55. The west end of the old alignment meets MD 36 just south of its intersection with Alt US 40. MD 638, which prior to the realignment ended at US 40, was not truncated, and thus ends at MD 743.

=== Historic bridges ===
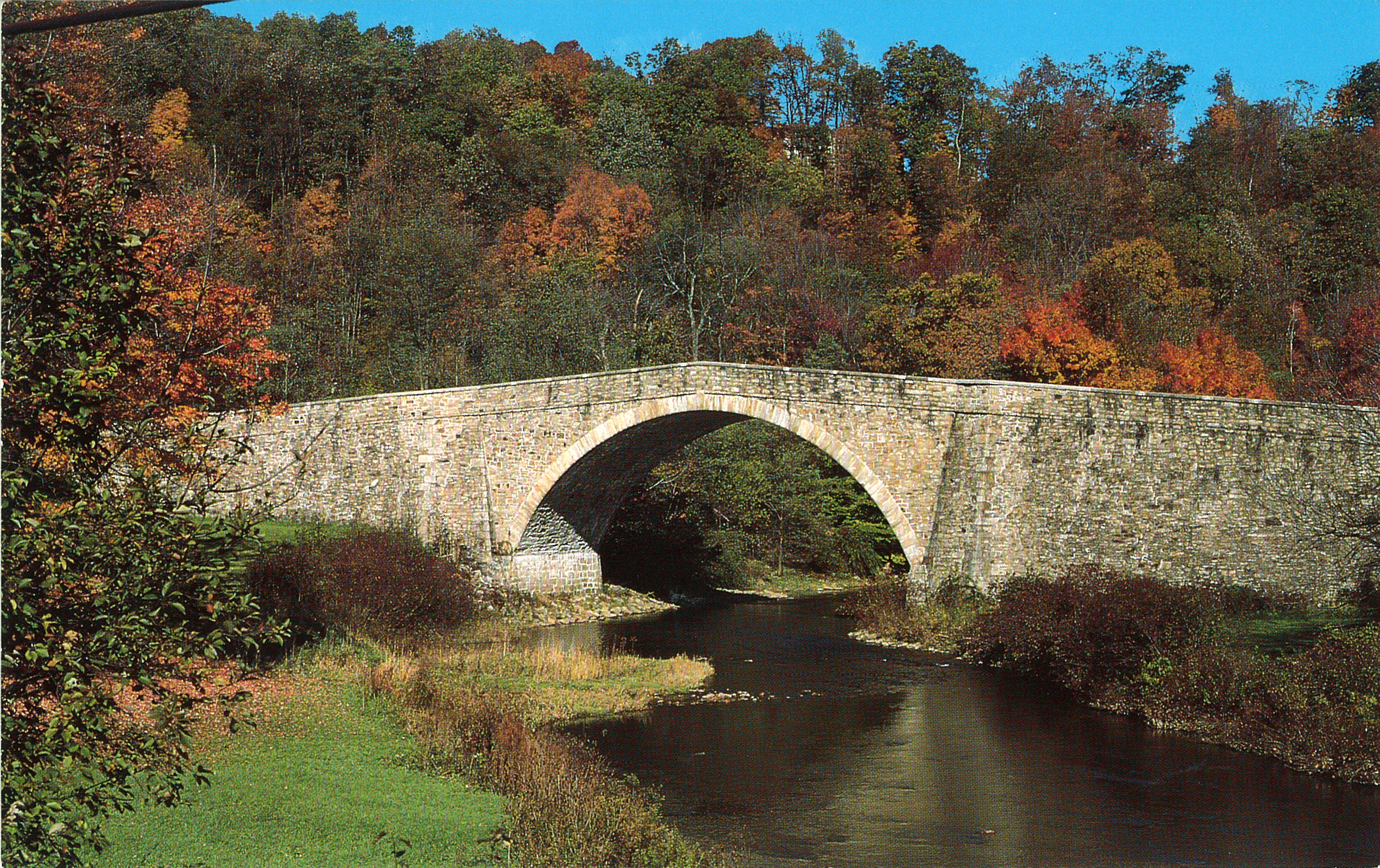
The Casselman River Bridge as it appeared in 1979

There are several historic bridges along the National Road that are still present near the current route of Alt US 40. Among them are the Casselman River bridge in Grantsville, and the bridge over Braddock Run, a tributary of Wills Creek, in Clarysville. The original National Road bridge over the Casselman River was a stone arch bridge constructed in 1813. The 80-foot (24 m) span was built to be the largest bridge of its type in the United States at the time, and during its construction it was believed that the bridge could not stand on its own. The bridge was constructed in this manner in the hopes that the Chesapeake and Ohio Canal would eventually pass under it, though construction on the canal was stopped at Cumberland in 1850. When US 40 was first designated in 1925, it crossed the Casselman River on the original stone bridge. In 1933, a new steel bridge was constructed to replace the National Road bridge, and it is this bridge that Alt US 40 now follows. The original bridge was declared a National Historic Landmark in 1964, and is now part of the Casselman River Bridge State Park.

Another historic bridge stands in Clarysville, near the intersection of Alt US 40 and MD 55. This bridge, which crosses Braddock Run, was built in 1812, with later work being done in 1843. The stone arch bridge, located just south of the current alignment of Alt US 40, was restored in 1976.

=== Origins of Alt US 40 ===
Prior to the construction of I-68, US 40 followed the route currently designated as U.S. Route 40 Alternate. The first segment of what would become I-68 was built in Cumberland in the mid-1960s. The freeway, first designated as US 48, was extended westward through the 1970s, reaching West Virginia in 1976. The portions of US 40 that were bypassed between Cumberland and Keysers Ridge became U.S. Route 40 Alternate, which first appeared on MDSHA maps in the early 1980s. At this time, US 40 was realigned to follow the US 48 freeway, sharing the freeway with US 48. In 1991 the freeway was completed from Hancock to Morgantown, West Virginia. The US 48 designation was retired, and on August 2, 1991, the freeway became I-68.

== Junction list ==
| County | Location | mi | km | Destinations | Notes |
|---|---|---|---|---|---|
| Garrett | Keyser's Ridge | 0.00 | 0.00 | US 40 (National Pike) to I-68 / US 219 – Uniontown, PA, Accident, Deep Creek Lake, Oakland | Western terminus of US 40 Alt. |
| Garrett | Grantsville | 5.30 | 8.53 | MD 669 north (Springs Road) – Springs, PA, Salisbury, PA | |
| Garrett | Grantsville | 5.59 | 9.00 | MD 495 south (South Yoder Street) to I-68 – Oakland | |
| Garrett | Grantsville | 8.71 | 14.02 | US 219 Bus. to I-68 / US 40 – Meyersdale, PA, Somerset, PA | |
| Garrett | Finzel | 16.22 | 26.10 | MD 946 north (Finzel Road) | |
| Allegany | Frostburg | 19.66 | 31.64 | MD 36 north (Mount Savage Road) | West end of MD 36 overlap |
| Allegany | Frostburg | 20.13 | 32.40 | MD 936 south (Grant Street, Old Upper Georges Creek Road) – Midland | |
| Allegany | Frostburg | 20.73 | 33.36 | MD 36 south (Upper Georges Creek Road) to I-68 | East end of MD 36 overlap |
| Allegany | Eckhart Mines | 21.59 | 34.75 | MD 638 (Parkersburg Road) – Mount Savage | |
| Allegany | Eckhart Mines | 21.86 | 35.18 | MD 743 west (Old National Pike) | |
| Allegany | Clarysville | 22.40 | 36.05 | MD 55 south (Vale Summit Road) – Vale Summit, Midland | |
| Allegany | LaVale | 24.80 | 39.91 | MD 53 south to I-68 east | |
| Allegany | LaVale | 25.15 | 40.48 | I-68 west / US 40 west (National Freeway) – Frostburg | I-68 Exit 39 |
| Allegany | LaVale | 25.64 | 41.26 | MD 658 south (Vocke Road) to I-68 east | |
| Allegany | Cumberland | 28.82 | 46.38 | MD 36 south (Mount Savage Road) – Mount Savage | |
| Allegany | Cumberland | 31.80 | 51.18 | I-68 / US 40 / US 220 (National Freeway) – Frostburg, Hagerstown | Eastern terminus of US 40 Alt, I-68 Exit 44 |
1.000 mi = 1.609 km; 1.000 km = 0.621 mi: Concurrency terminus
