= Bowling Green, Maryland =

- Census-designated place
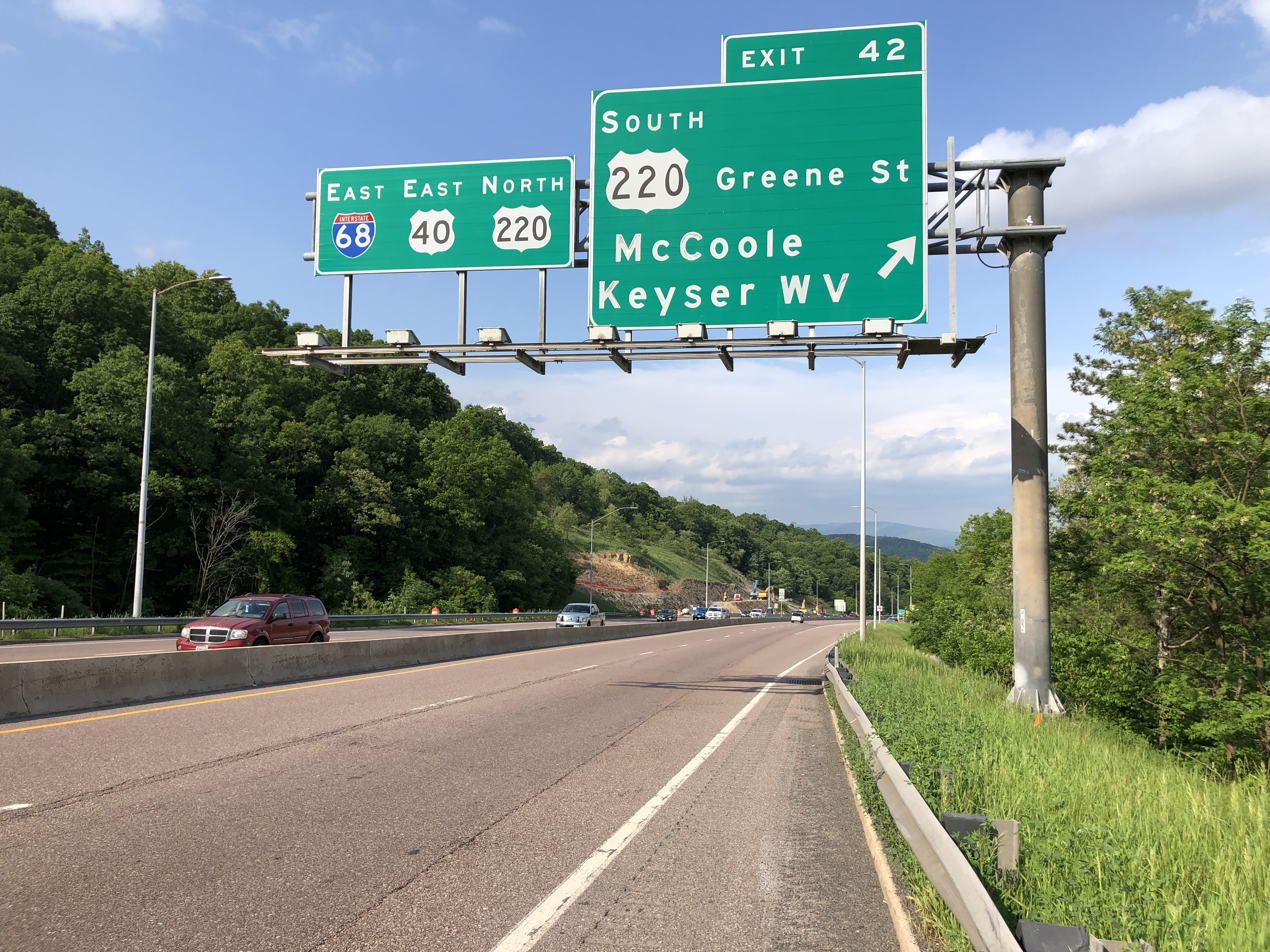
- I-68/US 40 in Bowling Green

- Location within the State of Maryland Bowling Green, Maryland (the United States)
- Coordinates: 39°37′25″N 78°48′22″W
- Country: United States
- State: Maryland
- County: Allegany

Area
  - Total: 0.97 sq mi (2.50 km^{2})
  - Land: 0.97 sq mi (2.50 km^{2})
  - Water: 0 sq mi (0.00 km^{2})
- Elevation: 666 ft (203 m)

Population (2020)
  - Total: 1,018
  - Density: 1,056.4/sq mi (407.87/km^{2})
- Time zone: UTC−5 (Eastern (EST))
  - Summer (DST): UTC−4 (EDT)
- ZIP code: 21502
- Area codes: 240 and 301
- FIPS code: 24-08850
- GNIS feature ID: 2583587

Bowling Green is an unincorporated community and census-designated place (CDP) in Allegany County, Maryland, United States. As of the 2010 census it had a population of 1,077.

It is located along U.S. Route 220 (McMullen Highway), directly southwest of the city of Cumberland and includes the former community of Roberts. The CDP of Potomac Park borders Bowling Green to the south, the Potomac River is to the east and Haystack Mountain is to the west. For many years, the community was mostly farmland but was later divided into building lots by the Buchanan, Roberts and Long families. CSX Transportation railroad tracks skirt the community along the river; in earlier years, a predecessor maintained the Roberts train station, which has since been closed.

The Upper Potomac Industrial Park is located in the northern part of the community, close to Cumberland.

== Demographics ==
Historical population
Census	Pop.	Note	%±
2010	1,077		—
2020	1,018		−5.5%
U.S. Decennial Census
