= Mountain Ridge High School (Maryland) =

Location
- 100 Dr. Nancy S. Grasmick Lane; Frostburg, Maryland 21532; United States; 39°38′57″N 78°54′50″W

Information
- Type: Public Secondary school
- Established: 2007
- Status: Open
- School board: Allegany County Board of Education
- School district: Allegany County Public Schools
- Oversight: Maryland State Department of Education
- Superintendent: Jeffrey S. Blank
- Principal: Kendra Kenney
- Grades: 9–12
- Enrollment: 734 (2024)
- Colors: Red, Black, White, & Gold
- Mascot: Miner
- Nickname: MRHS, Ridge
- Team name: Mountain Ridge Miners
- USNWR ranking: 6,397
- Feeder schools: Georges Creek Elementary, Westernport Elementary, Beall Elementary, Frost Elementary, Mount Savage Middle. Westmar Middle
- Website: Mountain Ridge High School website

Mountain Ridge High School is a public high school located in the city of Frostburg in Allegany County, Maryland, United States. Serving over 1000 students from the greater Georges Creek Valley region, Mountain Ridge High School is part of the Allegany County Public Schools. The school's mascot is the "miner" and its colors are black, red, gold, and white.

== History ==
Prior to the schools establishment in 2007, the students of the greater Georges Creek Valley were served by Westmar High School in Lonaconing, Maryland and Beall High School in Frostburg, Maryland.

Westmar High School was located in Lonaconing, Maryland, and enrolled more than 400 students from the Georges Creek Valley and the region surrounding U.S. Route 220 between Danville and McCoole. The school mascot was the wildcat and its colors were red and gray. Westmar High School was created after the consolidation of Valley High School (of Lonaconing) and Bruce High School (of Westernport). Bruce closed in 1986, its students transferring to Valley High School while Bruce became a middle school. During the 1989-1990 school year, controversy erupted surrounding the school's name which remained the same following the consolidation, and was renamed Westmar High School to better signify a united Valley and Bruce in late 1989. Subsequently, Bruce Middle School became Westmar Middle School. In the fall of 2007, Westmar Middle relocated from its Westernport location to the Westmar High School building in Lonaconing following the closure of Westmar High earlier in 2007.

Valley High School was established in 1953 as a result of the consolidation of Central High School (of Lonaconing) and Barton High School (of Barton). Central High School was located in front of the Iron Furnace in Lonaconing. Its doors opened in the fall of 1896 and was the first official high school in the Lonaconing area. Barton High School was located on Latrobe St. Valley High School's mascot was the Black Knight, and the school colors were black and silver.

Bruce High School was the first official high school in Westernport. Bruce High opened in 1893 and closed 1986. It was first located on Hammond Street prior to 1900, then moved to Church Street where Westernport Elementary School is now. In 1957, Bruce moved to a new location on Philos Avenue. In 1986, Bruce High closed and the building became the new Bruce Middle School. In 1989, Bruce Middle became Westmar Middle. In 2007, Westmar Middle relocated to Lonaconing, vacating the former Bruce building. Bruce was named after Oliver Herman Bruce, principal of Westernport schools from 1875 until 1920. The school colors were Blue & White and the mascot was the Bulldog.

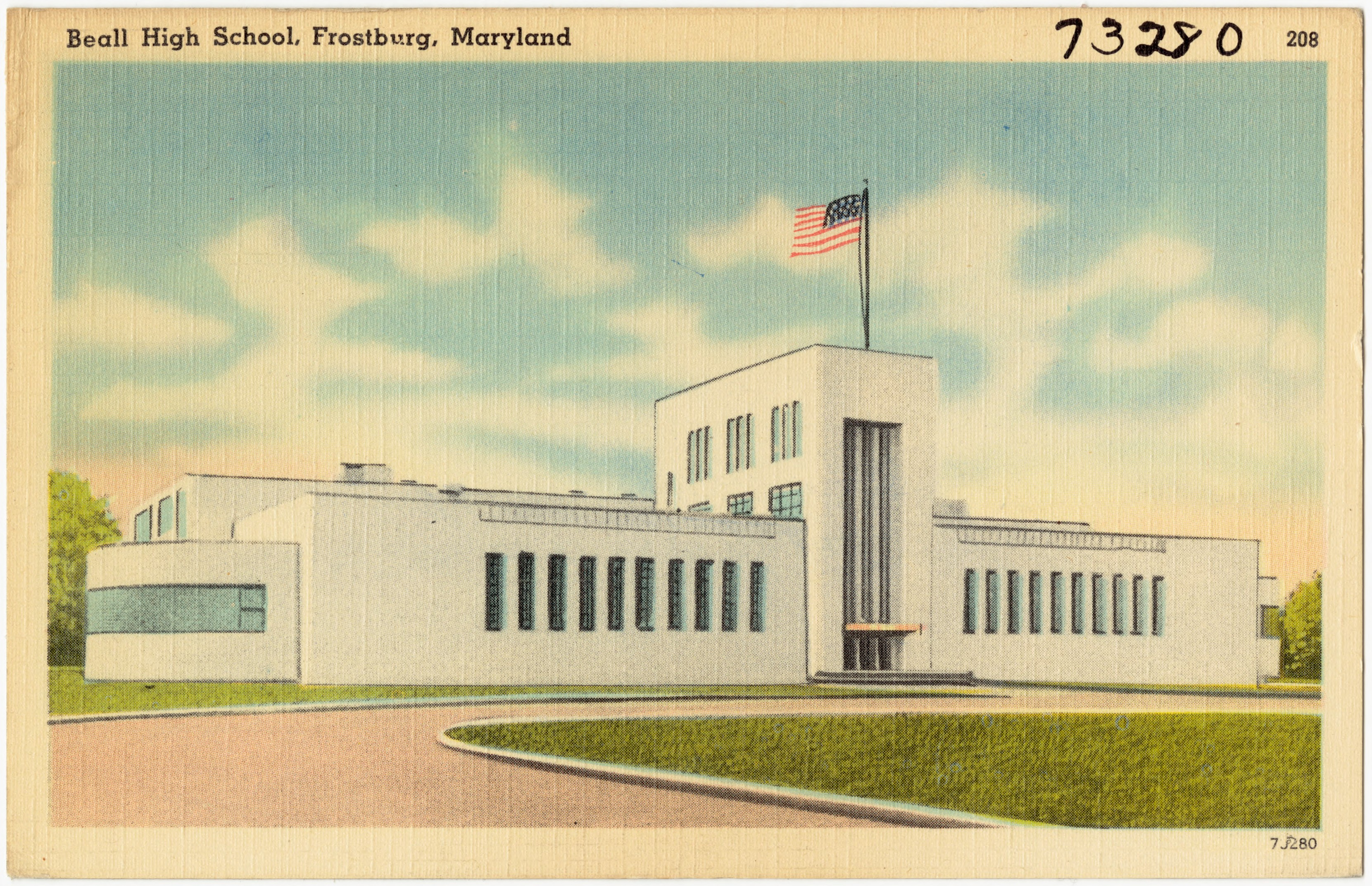
Postcard of Beall High School, c. 1930–1945.

Beall High School was established in the mid-1890s as the first high school of Frostburg. The first Beall High School was located at the corner of Loo Street (now College Avenue) and Broadway, where Beall Elementary School stands today. The first graduating class consisted of six female graduates in 1897. The original building was renovated in 1910, and expanded in 1930. By the late 1930s, the Frostburg community was in dire need of a much larger, newer facility. In 1939, ground was broken for a new Beall High School, located at 331 E. Main Street, in an area locally known as the "Eckhart Flat." The newer building is the one that most graduates and citizens of Frostburg are familiar with. It was considered an architectural wonder of its time with its Art Deco styling.

In 2000, Beall consolidated with Mount Savage High School which is currently occupied by Mount Savage (K-8) School. The elementary school section of Mount Savage (K-5) houses students from the Mt. Savage region only. The middle school section (6-8) houses students from both Frostburg and Mt. Savage (all students living in the former Beall High school district). In 2007, Beall High School closed and the student body consolidated with that of Westmar High into the newly built Mountain Ridge High School, constructed at the site of the former Beall High School Stadium. In the fall of 2007, Beall was demolished in order to make way for athletic fields for Mountain Ridge.

The school mascot was the Mountaineer and the school colors were blue and gold.

== Student demographics ==
As of 2026, the student population of Mountain Ridge High School is 743, with a student-to-teacher ratio of 17:1 and a total of 45 teachers in the building. The school is predominantly white, with a total of 12 Hispanic students, 9 Black students, 10 Asian students, 1 American Indian/Alaskan Native student, 1 Native Hawaiian/Pacific Islander student, and 29 students of two or more races.

== State championships ==
Girls Soccer

- Steve Malone Sportsmanship Award 2010

Boys Soccer:

- Class 1A 2010, 2011, 2019
- Steve Malone Sportsmanship Award 2010

Baseball

- Class 1A 2012

Softball

- Class 1A 2012, 2013

Tennis

- Class 1A Mixed Doubles 2019

Girls Track & Field

- Class 1A 4x800 Meter Relay 2013

=== Fall sports ===
Football, Boys' Soccer, Girls' Soccer, Cross Country, Golf, Unified Tennis, Volleyball

=== Winter sports ===
Boys' Basketball, Girls' Basketball, Wrestling, Bowling, Unified Bocce Ball

=== Spring sports ===
Baseball, Softball, Track & Field, Tennis, Unified Track
