= Danville, Maryland =

Danville, Maryland may refer to:

- Danville, Allegany County, Maryland, an unincorporated community in Allegany County
- Danville, Prince George's County, Maryland, an unincorporated community in Prince George's County
