= Inns on the National Road =

Historic district in Maryland, United States

- U.S. National Register of Historic Places
- U.S. Historic district
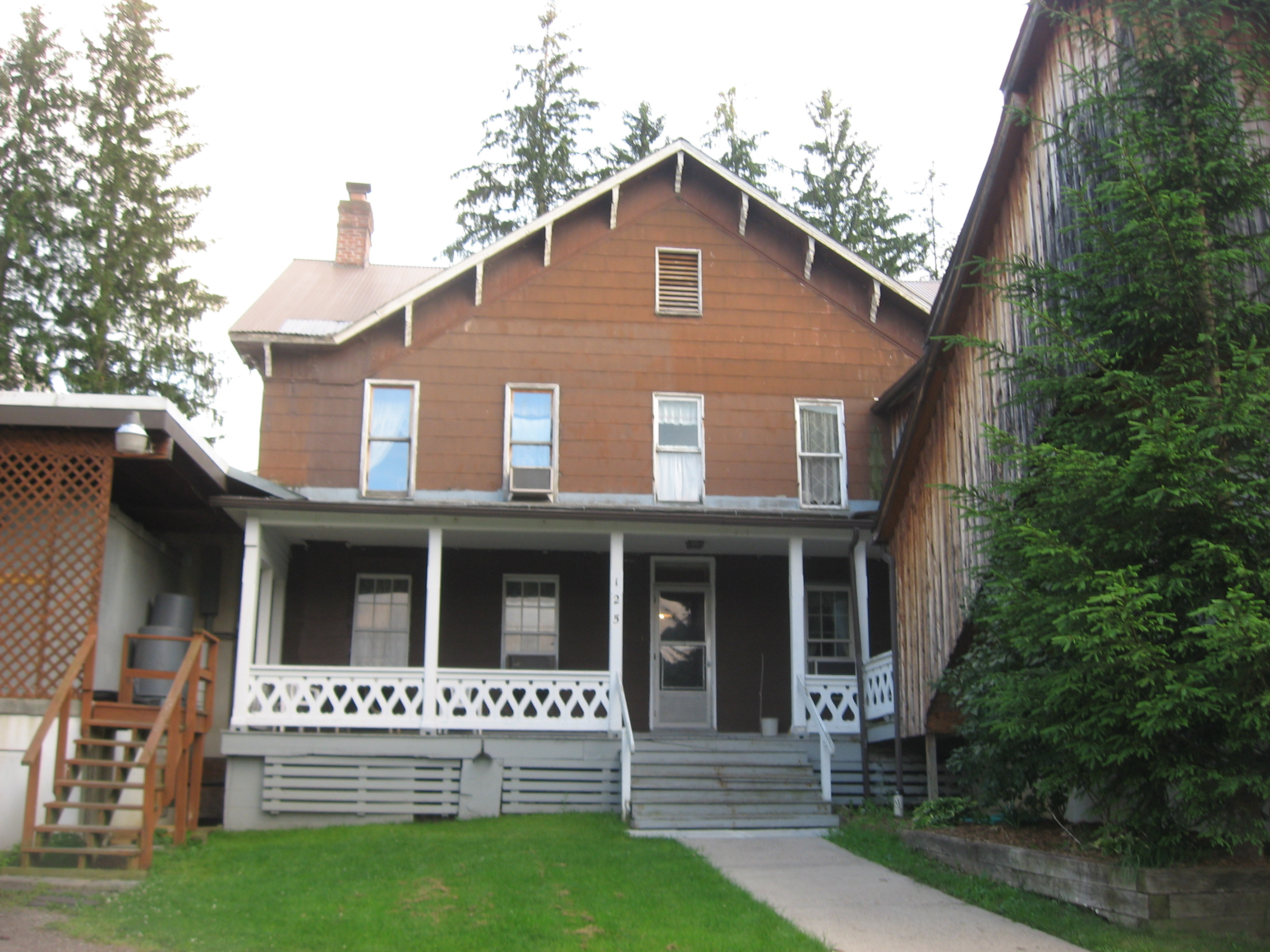
- Penn Alps

- Location within Maryland Location within the United States
- Location: E and W of Cumberland on U.S. 40 from Flintstone to Grantsville (also in Garrett County), Grantsville, Maryland
- Nearest city: Cumberland, Maryland
- Coordinates: 39°40′49″N 78°52′12″W
- Area: 5.5 acres (2.2 ha)
- Architectural style: Greek Revival, Italianate
- NRHP reference No.: 76000976
- Added to NRHP: December 22, 1976

The Inns on the National Road is a national historic district near Cumberland, Allegany County, Maryland. It originally consisted of 11 Maryland inns on the National Road and located in Allegany and Garrett counties. Those that remain stand as the physical remains of the almost-legendary hospitality offered on this well-traveled route to the west.

It was listed on the National Register of Historic Places in 1976.

== Allegany County ==
- Clarysville Inn site: The Clarysville Inn stood along the old section of the National Road, U.S. Route 40, to the south of the present road at Clarysville. It was a 2 1/2-story brick structure with flush double chimneys at the gable ends, a symmetrical facade, and 6/6 sash windows. After 1936, the original porch with a balustrade was replaced by semi-circular Tuscan-columned porch which extended the length of the central three bays and also contained an upper-level balustrade. Supposedly built around 1807 by a wealthy mid-western landowner, the Inn was initially used as a tavern along the old turnpike. The inn was used as a hospital during the American Civil War and then used as a restaurant before it was destroyed by fire on March 10, 1999. Once owned by family and Cas Taylor the inn was sold between 1970s and 1995 to an unknown buyer.
- Colonial Manor: Colonial Manor, or Turkey Flight Manor, is on the south side of present U.S. Route 40, north of old Route 40 in the Naves Crossroad area at the intersection of U.S. Route 220. It is a 2 1/2-story, mid-19th-century classically influenced brick structure. It was altered in the 1940s when Route 40 was relocated to the north of the house. The building served as a hospital after the American Civil War battle at nearby Falch's Mill in 1864.
- Early Frame House: Early Frame House is located on U.S. Route 40 at Pleasant Grove on the slope of a hill several feet above the National Pike. It is a 2 1/2-story, mid-19th-century frame structure with a tin-covered gable roof.
- Five Mile House: Five Mile House is one mile west of Four Mile House and five miles west of Cumberland, on U.S. Route 40 at La Vale. It is two and a half stories high and five bays in width, with a large cross gable.
- Flintstone Hotel: Flintstone Hotel, also called the Piper Hotel, is located on U.S. Route 40 at Flintstone. It is a large 2 1/2-story classically influenced brick structure the early to mid-19th century. It is said to have been built originally about 1807 for John Davis (a large landowner) as a private residence. Well-known visitors to the hotel are believed to include the Marquis de Lafayette (1824), Henry Clay, and Theodore Roosevelt.
- Four Mile House: Four Mile House is one mile east of Five Mile House and four miles west of Cumberland, on U.S. Route 40 at La Vale. It is a 2 1/2-story, mid-19th-century brick structure of Greek Revival influence. An Ionic-columned porch with a turned balustrade stretches across at the first floor level. It was built about 1840 for Samuel Eckles and rebuilt after a fire in the late 1950s or early 1960s destroyed the second floor rooms.
- Six Mile House: Six Mile House is located six miles east of Cumberland, on the Baltimore Turnpike, also known as the National Road and later renamed U.S. Route 40. It is a 2 1/2-story brick structure built during the 1830s–1840s.
- Stone House: Stone House is on an abandoned section of U.S. Route 40 at Pleasant Valley, about two miles west of Flintstone. It is the shell of an early-19th-century, 2 1/2-story stone structure with a gable roof. It was supposedly built about 1819 as a tavern for Jonas Street.

== Garrett County ==
- Casselman (Hotel): Casselman (Hotel) is located on U.S. Route 40 at Grantsville. It is a 2 1/2-story, Greek Revival brick structure, built about 1842. It was built for Solomon Sterner to serve travelers on the National Road.
- National Hotel (demolished): The National Hotel was on U.S. Route 40 at Maryland Route 495, Grantsville. It was a 3 1/2-story, 19th-century hip-roofed frame structure built about 1842. It was built for Henry Fuller, an innkeeper from Salisbury, Pennsylvania, on the site of the Lehman House, an earlier hostelry. It has been demolished.
- Penn Alps, Main Building: Penn Alps, Main Building, stands between present U.S. 40 and old U.S. 40, east of Grantsville. It was built in the early 19th century as a log house, then enlarged to two and a half stories, and "modernized" in the Italianate style in the late 19th century. It was converted for commercial use with major renovations and additions in the 20th century.

- Tomlinson Inn and the Little Meadows
- U.S. National Register of Historic Places
- U.S. Historic district
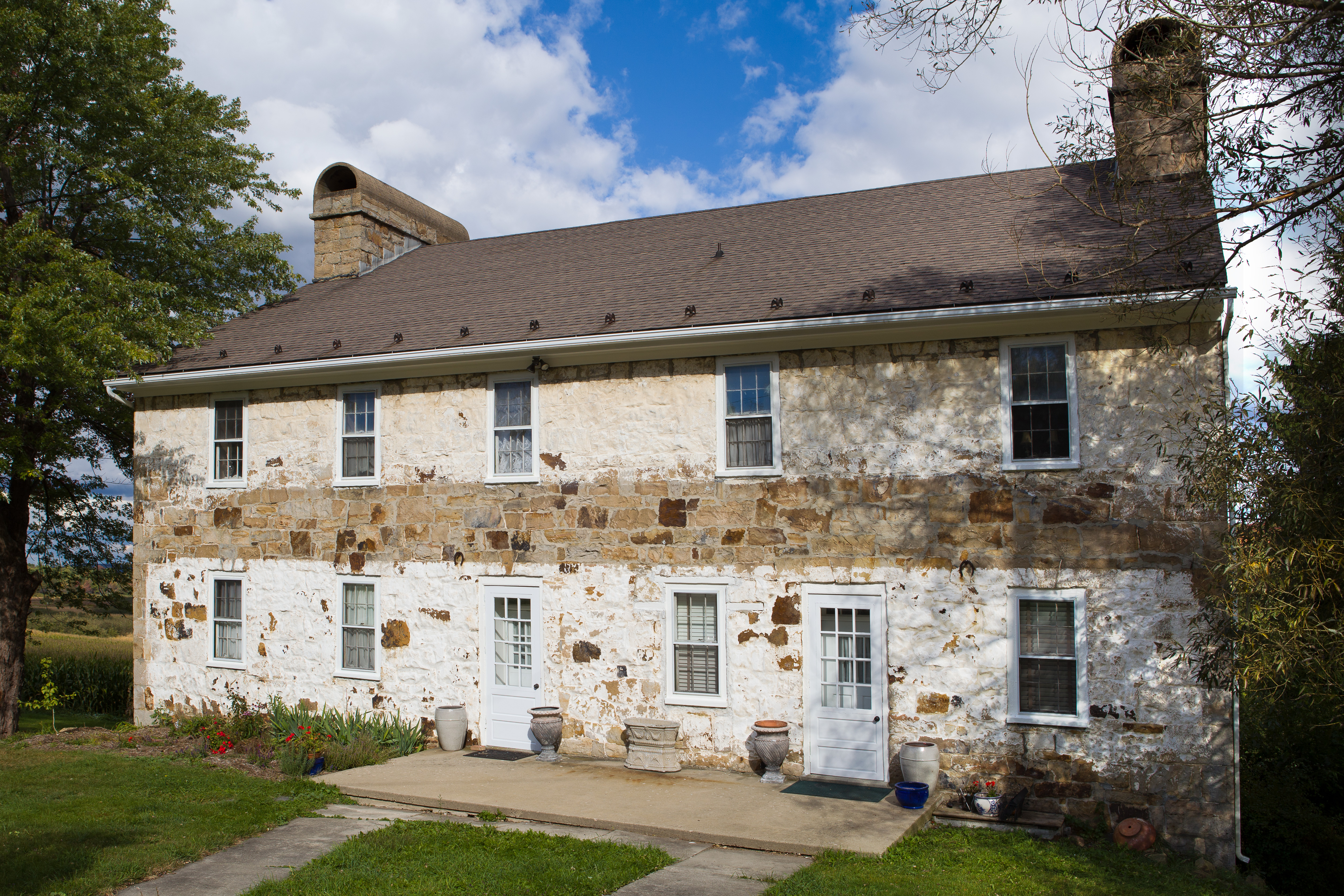
- Tomlinson Inn

- Location within Maryland Location within the United States
- Nearest city: Grantsville, Maryland
- Coordinates: 39°41′54″N 79°5′10″W
- Area: 897 acres (363 ha)
- Built: 1818
- NRHP reference No.: 73000920
- Added to NRHP: September 20, 1973

- Tomlinson Inn and The Little Meadows: Tomlinson Inn and The Little Meadows is located on U.S. Route 40 at Grantsville. It is a large, rectangular, stone structure built on a hillside. It was constructed about 1818 and has two full stories plus an attic and basement. It was one of the earliest hostelries on the National Road, built by Jesse Tomlinson. In 1845, President James K. Polk stopped on the way to his inauguration.

It was listed on the National Register of Historic Places in 1973.
