= Allegany County Public Schools =

School district in Maryland, U.S.

Location
- 108 Washington St Cumberland, Maryland, 21502; United States

District information
- Type: Public
- Motto: Great Teaching. Great Learning. Every Student. Every Day.
- Grades: Pre-K-12
- County Superintendent: Jeffrey S. Blank
- School board: Chrystal Bender, President; Robert “Bob” Farrell, Vice President; Debra Frank, Board Member; Tammy Fraley, Board Member; Dr. David A. Bohn, Board Member; Brooklyne Noel, Student Board Member

Other information
- Website: acpsmd.org

Allegany County Public Schools is a public school district serving Allegany County, Maryland, United States.

It is the school district for the entire county.

== High schools ==
- Allegany High School, Cumberland
- Fort Hill High School, Cumberland
- Mountain Ridge High School, Frostburg

== Middle schools ==
- Braddock Middle School, Cumberland
- Mount Savage Middle School, Mount Savage
- Washington Middle School, Cumberland
- Westmar Middle School, Lonaconing

== Elementary schools ==
- Beall Elementary School, Frostburg
- Bel Air Elementary School, Cumberland
- Cash Valley Elementary School, LaVale
- Cresaptown Elementary School, Cresaptown
- Flintstone Elementary School, Flintstone
- Frost Elementary School, Frostburg
- George's Creek Elementary School, Lonaconing
- John Humbird Elementary School, Cumberland
- Mount Savage Elementary School, Mount Savage
- Northeast Elementary School, Cumberland
- Parkside Elementary School, LaVale
- South Penn Elementary School, Cumberland
- West Side Elementary School, Cumberland
- Westernport Elementary School, Westernport

== Vocational schools ==
- Center for Career and Technical Education, Cresaptown

== Other schools ==
- Eckhart Alternative School, Eckhart Mines
