= LaVale, Maryland =

- Census-designated place
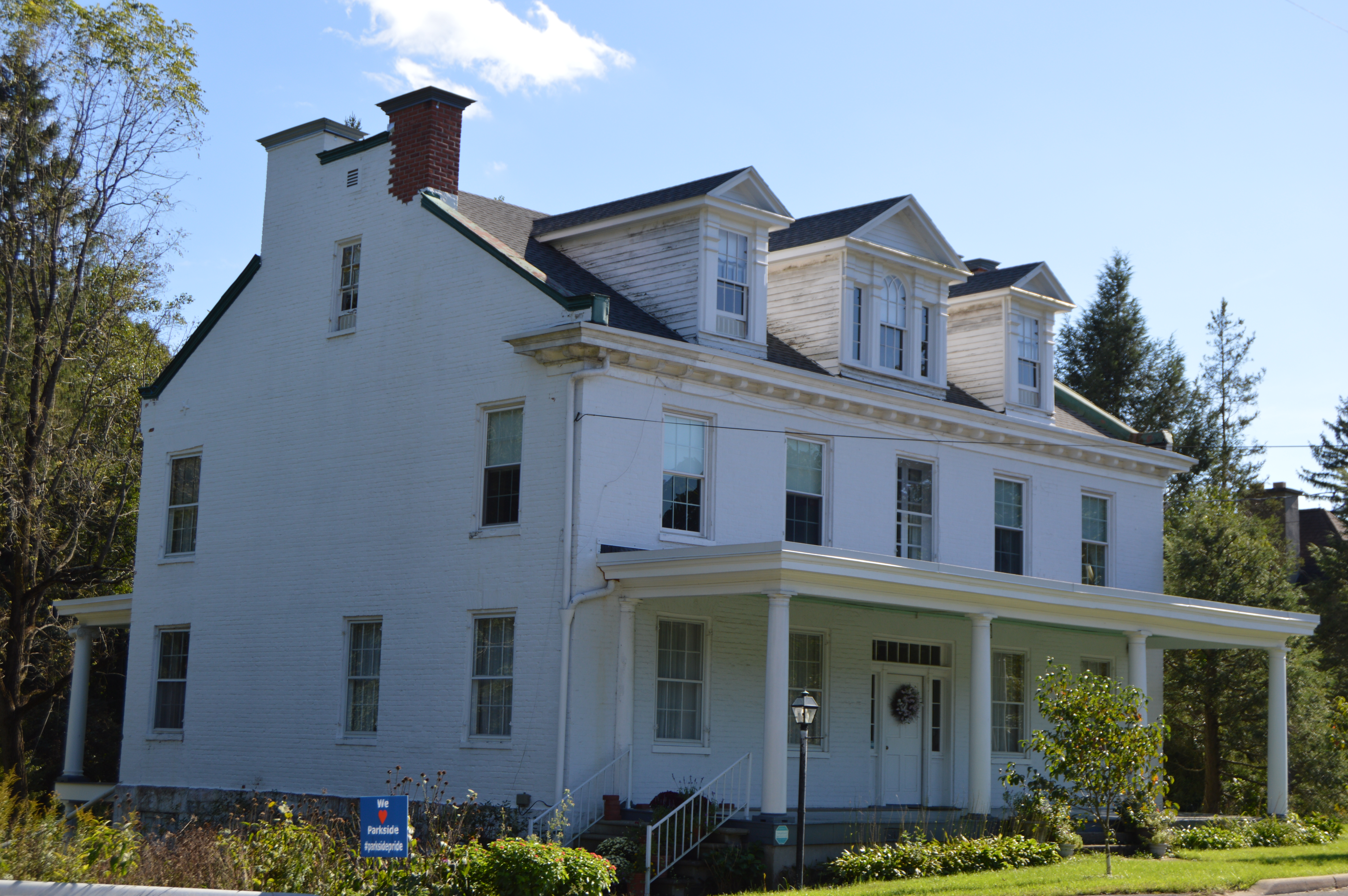
- Four Mile House (c. 1840), one of the inns on the National Road

- Location of LaVale, Maryland
- Coordinates: 39°39′17″N 78°48′46″W
- Country: United States
- State: Maryland
- County: Allegany

Area
  - Total: 9.12 sq mi (23.61 km^{2})
  - Land: 9.11 sq mi (23.60 km^{2})
  - Water: 0.0039 sq mi (0.01 km^{2})
- Elevation: 784 ft (239 m)

Population (2020)
  - Total: 4,201
  - Density: 461.0/sq mi (177.99/km^{2})
- Time zone: UTC−5 (Eastern (EST))
  - Summer (DST): UTC−4 (EDT)
- ZIP codes: 21502, 21504
- Area codes: 301, 240
- FIPS code: 24-46075
- GNIS feature ID: 0590618

LaVale is a census-designated place (CDP) in Allegany County, Maryland, United States. It is part of the Cumberland, MD-WV Metropolitan Statistical Area. The population was 4,201 as of the 2020 census.

== Geography ==
LaVale is located at 39°39′17″N 78°48′46″W, in the shadow of Haystack Mountain. To the east is Cumberland, accessible via the Cumberland Narrows, a water gap between Haystack Mountain to the south and Wills Mountain to the north. To the west is Piney Mountain and Frostburg. LaVale is located along the National Road, one of the original highways built in the United States which carried early American settlers west of the Appalachian Mountains. LaVale is a business center that contains the largest concentration of retail and the only indoor shopping mall, Country Club Mall, in the Cumberland Metropolitan area.

The LaVale Tollgate House was listed on the National Register of Historic Places in 1971.

According to the United States Census Bureau, the CDP has a total area of 2.7 square miles (6.9 km^{2}), all land.

== Demographics ==
Historical population
Census	Pop.	Note	%±
2020	4,201		—
U.S. Decennial Census

As of the census of 2000, there were 4,613 people, 1,924 households, and 1,377 families residing in the CDP. The population density was 567.9 inhabitants per square mile (219.3/km^{2}). There were 2,045 housing units at an average density of 251.8 per square mile (97.2/km^{2}). The racial makeup of the CDP was 97.59% White, 0.65% African American, 0.04% Native American, 1.02% Asian, 0.02% Pacific Islander, 0.13% from other races, and 0.54% from two or more races. Hispanic or Latino of any race were 0.48% of the population.

There were 1,924 households, out of which 26.7% had children under the age of 18 living with them, 61.7% were married couples living together, 7.6% had a female householder with no husband present, and 28.4% were non-families. 25.1% of all households were made up of individuals, and 14.2% had someone living alone who was 65 years of age or older. The average household size was 2.38 and the average family size was 2.82.

In the CDP, the population was spread out, with 20.6% under the age of 18, 7.0% from 18 to 24, 24.3% from 25 to 44, 27.6% from 45 to 64, and 20.6% who were 65 years of age or older. The median age was 44 years. For every 100 females, there were 94.6 males. For every 100 females age 18 and over, there were 89.0 males.

The median income for a household in the CDP was $42,911, and the median income for a family was $48,494. Males had a median income of $33,125 versus $23,179 for females. The per capita income for the CDP was $20,989. About 4.8% of families and 7.3% of the population were below the poverty line, including 4.9% of those under age 18 and 5.1% of those age 65 or over.

== Library ==
The LaVale Public Library is part of the Allegany Country Library System. The first public library in LaVale opened on April 18, 1953. The current building opened on September 28, 1975. The library temporarily closed for major renovations in 2020, and reopened on September 22, 2022. At over 18,000 square feet, nearly double the original size, the newly renovated and expanded library houses the largest collection of materials in the Allegany County Library System, and is home to large conference spaces, group study areas, an open-air patio that doubles as an outdoor classroom, and a "library of things," where patrons can borrow from a selection of everyday household items.

== Major roads ==
- Interstate 68
- US Alternate Route 40
- Maryland Route 49
- Maryland Route 53

== Schools ==
LaVale is served by the Allegany County Public Schools district. Students in LaVale are zoned for the following schools:

- Parkside Elementary School
- Cash Valley Elementary School
- Braddock Middle School (in Cumberland)
- Allegany High School (in Cumberland)
