= Potomac Park, Maryland =

- Census-designated place
- Location within the State of Maryland Potomac Park, Maryland (the United States)
- Coordinates: 39°36′45″N 78°48′30″W
- Country: United States
- State: Maryland
- County: Allegany

Area
  - Total: 0.39 sq mi (1.00 km^{2})
  - Land: 0.39 sq mi (1.00 km^{2})
  - Water: 0 sq mi (0.00 km^{2})
- Elevation: 738 ft (225 m)

Population (2020)
  - Total: 821
  - Density: 2,128.7/sq mi (821.91/km^{2})
- Time zone: UTC−5 (Eastern (EST))
  - Summer (DST): UTC−4 (EDT)
- ZIP code: 21502
- Area codes: 240 and 301
- FIPS code: 24-63425
- GNIS feature ID: 2583675

Potomac Park (/pəˈtoʊmək/) is an unincorporated subdivision and census-designated place (CDP) located on the North Branch Potomac River in Allegany County, Maryland, United States. As of the 2010 census, it had a population of 2,530. Potomac Park lies along U.S. Route 220 (McMullen Highway) between Cresaptown and Cumberland. The CDP of Bowling Green is immediately to the north on Route 220.

Within the boundaries of the community are the Allegany County Fairgrounds and the Western Correctional Institution.

== Demographics ==
Historical population
Census	Pop.	Note	%±
2020	821		—
U.S. Decennial Census
