= Dawson, Maryland =

- Census-designated place
- Location within the State of Maryland Dawson (the United States)
- Coordinates: 39°28′37″N 78°56′44″W
- Country: United States
- State: Maryland
- County: Allegany

Area
  - Total: 0.68 sq mi (1.76 km^{2})
  - Land: 0.61 sq mi (1.59 km^{2})
  - Water: 0.066 sq mi (0.17 km^{2})
- Elevation: 787 ft (240 m)

Population (2020)
  - Total: 100
  - Density: 162.8/sq mi (62.87/km^{2})
- Time zone: UTC-5 (Eastern (EST))
  - Summer (DST): UTC-4 (EDT)
- FIPS code: 24-21925
- GNIS feature ID: 2583606

Dawson is an unincorporated community and census-designated place (CDP) in Allegany County, Maryland, United States. As of the 2010 census it had a population of 103.

Dawson is on U.S. Route 220, 3 miles (5 km) northeast of Keyser, West Virginia, and 17 miles (27 km) southwest of Cumberland. It is situated along the northwest bank of the North Branch Potomac River, which forms the Maryland–West Virginia border.

== Demographics ==
Historical population
Census	Pop.	Note	%±
2020	100		—
U.S. Decennial Census
