= Bel Air, Allegany County, Maryland =

Bel Air
- Census-designated place
- Location within the State of Maryland
- Coordinates: 39°34′58″N 78°51′49″W
- Country: United States
- State: Maryland
- County: Allegany

Area
  - Total: 0.69 sq mi (1.78 km^{2})
  - Land: 0.69 sq mi (1.78 km^{2})
  - Water: 0 sq mi (0.00 km^{2})
- Elevation: 860 ft (260 m)

Population (2020)
  - Total: 1,689
  - Density: 2,459.3/sq mi (949.56/km^{2})
- Time zone: UTC−5 (Eastern (EST))
  - Summer (DST): UTC−4 (EDT)
- ZIP codes: 21502
- FIPS code: 24-05525
- GNIS feature ID: 2583580

Bel Air is a census-designated place (CDP) located in Allegany County, Maryland, United States. As of the 2010 census it had a population of 1,258. It is surrounded by the Cresaptown CDP and prior to 2010 was listed by the Census Bureau as part of the Cresaptown-Bel Air CDP. Bel Air is part of the Cumberland, MD-WV Metropolitan Statistical Area.

== Demographics ==
Historical population
Census	Pop.	Note	%±
2020	1,689		—
U.S. Decennial Census
