= Cresaptown-Bel Air, Maryland =

Unincorporated community in Maryland, United States

- Former census-designated place
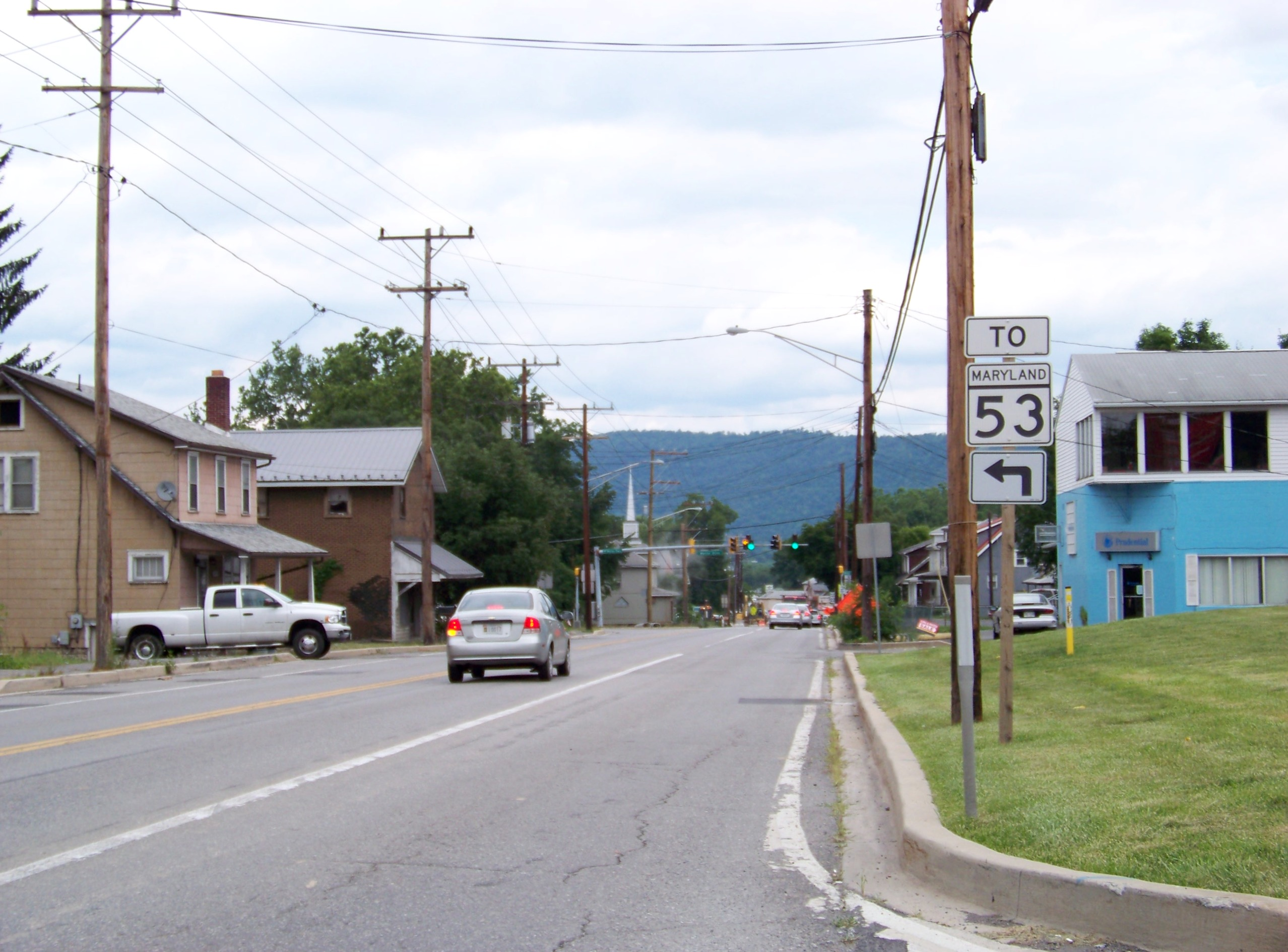

- Location of Cresaptown-Bel Air, Maryland
- Coordinates: 39°35′14″N 78°50′33″W
- Country: United States
- State: Maryland
- County: Allegany

Area
  - Total: 7.5 sq mi (19.3 km^{2})
  - Land: 7.5 sq mi (19.3 km^{2})
  - Water: 0 sq mi (0.0 km^{2})

Population (2000)
  - Total: 5,884
  - Density: 790/sq mi (305.1/km^{2})
- Time zone: UTC−5 (Eastern (EST))
  - Summer (DST): UTC−4 (EDT)
- FIPS code: 24-20530

Cresaptown-Bel Air was a census-designated place in Allegany County, Maryland, United States. The population was 5,884 at the 2000 census. For the 2010 census, the area was separated into two CDPs, Cresaptown and Bel Air.

Cresaptown-Bel Air is part of the Cumberland metropolitan area.

== Geography ==
Cresaptown-Bel Air is located at 39°35′14″N 78°50′33″W (39.587355, −78.842582).

According to the United States Census Bureau, the CDP had a total area of 7.4 square miles (19 km^{2}), all of it land.

== Demographics ==
At the 2000 census, there were 5,884 people, 1,765 households, and 1,251 families residing in the CDP. The population density was 790.1 inhabitants per square mile (305.1/km^{2}). There were 1,876 housing units at an average density of 251.9 per square mile (97.3/km^{2}). The racial makeup of the CDP was 78.21% White, 20.73% African American, 0.05% Native American, 0.51% Asian, 0.14% from other races, and 0.36% from two or more races. Hispanic or Latino of any race were 0.44% of the population.

There were 1,765 households, out of which 31.7% had children under the age of 18 living with them, 58.8% were married couples living together, 9.1% had a female householder with no husband present, and 29.1% were non-families. 24.9% of all households were made up of individuals, and 12.0% had someone living alone who was 65 years of age or older. The average household size was 2.41 and the average family size was 2.88.

In the CDP, the population was spread out, with 17.1% under the age of 18, 7.4% from 18 to 24, 39.9% from 25 to 44, 22.9% from 45 to 64, and 12.7% who were 65 years of age or older. The median age was 38 years. For every 100 females, there were 164.3 males. For every 100 females age 18 and over, there were 176.5 males.

The median income for a household in the CDP was $40,693, and the median income for a family was $46,563. Males had a median income of $39,397 versus $22,170 for females. The per capita income for the CDP was $20,279. About 4.0% of families and 6.5% of the population were below the poverty line, including 7.8% of those under age 18 and 5.5% of those age 65 or over.
