= Bier, Maryland =

- Census-designated place
- Location within the State of Maryland Bier (the United States)
- Coordinates: 39°33′02″N 78°52′23″W
- Country: United States
- State: Maryland
- County: Allegany

Area
  - Total: 1.46 sq mi (3.78 km^{2})
  - Land: 1.46 sq mi (3.77 km^{2})
  - Water: 0.0039 sq mi (0.01 km^{2})
- Elevation: 774 ft (236 m)

Population (2020)
  - Total: 186
  - Density: 127.7/sq mi (49.29/km^{2})
- Time zone: UTC−5 (Eastern (EST))
  - Summer (DST): UTC−4 (EDT)
- FIPS code: 24-07285
- GNIS feature ID: 2583582

Bier is an unincorporated community and census-designated place (CDP) in Allegany County, Maryland, United States. As of the 2010 census, it had a population of 173.

It is located along U.S. Route 220, 10 miles (16 km) southwest of Cumberland and 10 miles (16 km) northeast of Keyser, West Virginia.

== Demographics ==
Historical population
Census	Pop.	Note	%±
2020	186		—
U.S. Decennial Census
