= Danville, Allegany County, Maryland =

Danville, Maryland
- Census-designated place
- Location within the State of Maryland Danville (the United States)
- Coordinates: 39°30′45″N 78°55′06″W
- Country: United States
- State: Maryland
- County: Allegany

Area
  - Total: 1.14 sq mi (2.96 km^{2})
  - Land: 1.14 sq mi (2.96 km^{2})
  - Water: 0 sq mi (0.00 km^{2})
- Elevation: 1,024 ft (312 m)

Population (2020)
  - Total: 224
  - Density: 196.1/sq mi (75.72/km^{2})
- Time zone: UTC−5 (Eastern (EST))
  - Summer (DST): UTC−4 (EDT)
- FIPS code: 24-21675
- GNIS feature ID: 2583604

Danville is an unincorporated community and census-designated place (CDP) in Allegany County, Maryland, United States. As of the 2010 census it had a population of 271.

Danville is located along U.S. Route 220, 14 miles (23 km) southwest of Cumberland, and 6 miles (10 km) northeast of Keyser, West Virginia. The community lies in a valley bounded by 2,800-foot (850 m) Dans Mountain to the northwest and 1,500-foot (460 m) Fort Hill to the southeast.

== Demographics ==
Historical population
Census	Pop.	Note	%±
2020	224		—
U.S. Decennial Census
