= Pinto, Maryland =

Unincorporated community in Maryland, United States

- Unincorporated community
- Location within the State of Maryland Pinto (the United States)
- Coordinates: 39°34′11″N 78°50′21″W
- Country: United States
- State: Maryland
- County: Allegany
- Elevation: 791 ft (241 m)
- Time zone: UTC-5 (Eastern (EST))
  - Summer (DST): UTC-4 (EDT)
- ZIP code: 21556
- Area codes: 301 and 240
- GNIS feature ID: 586571

Pinto is an unincorporated community along the North Branch Potomac River in Allegany County, Maryland, United States across from Rocket Center, West Virginia. While the town was first known as Potomac, its post office is referred to as Pinto because there already exists a Potomac, Maryland. Pinto is located south of Cresaptown on Winchester Road.

Pinto once had a sizable apple orchard industry.
