= McCoole, Maryland =

- Census-designated place
- Location within the State of Maryland McCoole (the United States)
- Coordinates: 39°27′12″N 78°58′23″W
- Country: United States
- State: Maryland
- County: Allegany

Area
  - Total: 1.41 sq mi (3.64 km^{2})
  - Land: 1.41 sq mi (3.64 km^{2})
  - Water: 0 sq mi (0.00 km^{2})
- Elevation: 981 ft (299 m)

Population (2020)
  - Total: 449
  - Density: 319.7/sq mi (123.43/km^{2})
- Time zone: UTC−5 (Eastern (EST))
  - Summer (DST): UTC−4 (EDT)
- ZIP code: 21562
- FIPS code: 24-49325
- GNIS feature ID: 2583651

McCoole is an unincorporated community and census-designated place (CDP) in Allegany County, Maryland, United States. As of the 2010 census it had a population of 511.

McCoole is located at the intersection of U.S. Route 220 and the east end of Maryland Route 135. It lies directly across the North Branch Potomac River from Keyser, West Virginia. McCoole had its own post office in operation from 1903 to 1910.

== Demographics ==
Historical population
Census	Pop.	Note	%±
2020	449		—
U.S. Decennial Census
