= Cumberland Narrows =

Water gap in Maryland, United States

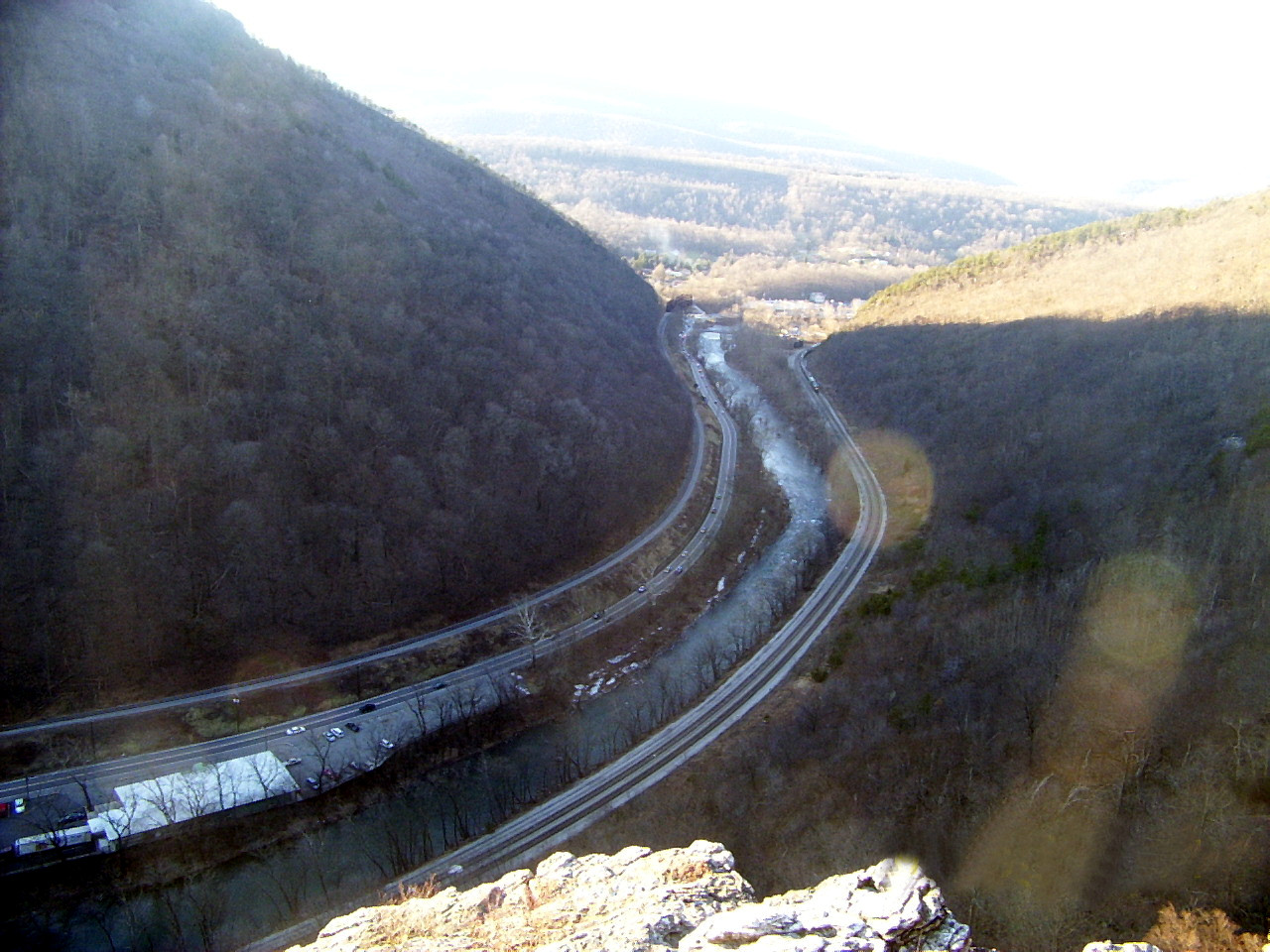
- The Cumberland Narrows west of Cumberland, Maryland, along Wills Creek, with Haystack Mountain on the left and Wills Mountain on the right. The Western Maryland Scenic Railroad (left), Alternate U.S. 40, the Old National Road (center, left of the creek), and the CSX Railroad (right) can be seen in the foreground.
- Interactive map of Cumberland Narrows
- Elevation: 620 feet (190 m)
- Traversed by: U.S. Route 40, the National Road

Third Approach
- Location: Allegany County, Maryland, U.S.
- Range: Ridge-and-Valley Appalachians
- Coordinates: 39°40′05″N 78°47′07″W
- Topo map: USGS Cumberland

The Cumberland Narrows (or simply The Narrows) is a water gap in western Maryland in the United States, just west of Cumberland. Wills Creek cuts through the central ridge of the Wills Mountain Anticline at a low elevation here between Wills Mountain to the north and Haystack Mountain to the south. Cliffs and talus of the two mountains' Tuscarora quartzite caprock are prominent within the Narrows. A prominent rocky outcropping at the south end of Wills Mountain in the Cumberland Narrows is known as Lover's Leap.

The geological features of the Narrows provide Cumberland a western backdrop of the two mountains with a narrow gap between them.

== Geography ==
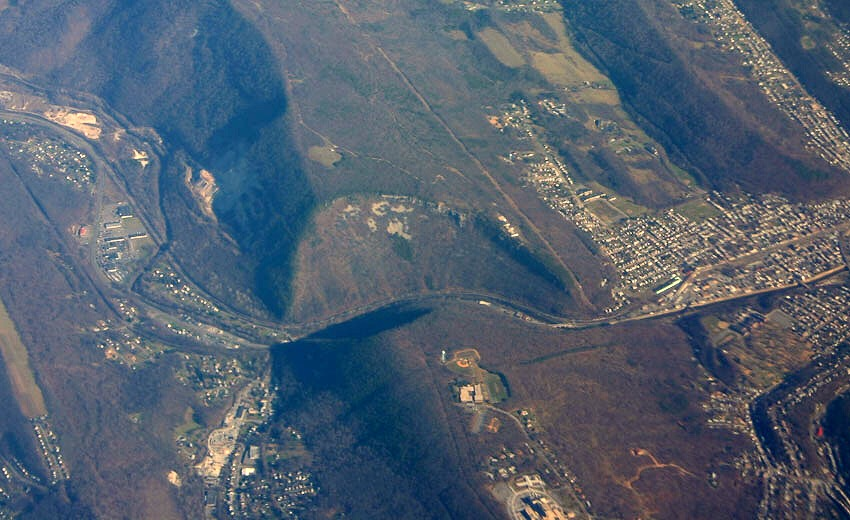
An oblique air photo of the Cumberland Narrows, facing northeast, December 2006

The Cumberland Narrows serves as a western gateway from Cumberland to the Appalachian Plateau and the Ohio River Valley beyond. Nemacolin's Path, which later became Old National Road and is now Alternate U.S. 40, passes through the Narrows, along with the former Baltimore and Ohio Railroad's main line between Baltimore/Washington and Pittsburgh, now part of the CSX system, and a former line of the Western Maryland Railway, now used by the steam- and diesel-powered excursion trains of the Western Maryland Scenic Railroad and the Great Allegheny Passage bike trail.

=== Lover's Leap ===
The rocky outcropping known as Lover's Leap is on Wills Mountain on the northeast side of the Cumberland Narrows. Lover's leap is 1,652 feet (504 m) above sea level and made up of oddly squared projections of rock, extending from its top all the way down to the National Highway (Alternate U.S. 40) below.

Today, these rocks high above Wills Creek provide one of the most popular views in the Allegheny Mountains, with Cumberland, the highway, and two railroads nearby below and the surrounding states of Pennsylvania and West Virginia in the distance.

== Industry ==
The 46-room Wills Mountain Inn, a turn-of-the-20th-Century hotel and resort with a view of the Narrows, was located on the northern side of Wills Mountain until it burned-down on August 6, 1930.

The Artmor Plastics Corporation was located on the Wills Mountain (northern) side of the Narrows in a former World War II textile factory. Artmor made household items such as plastic dishes and table tops. Following the closure of Artmor Plastics, the factory housed a museum chronicling the life of Arthur Morgan, Artmor's founder, as well as his rich art and history collection. After the death of Arthur Morgan, the building fell into disuse and disrepair and was the victim of frequent vandalism.

Local officials attempted to purchase the property with State funds to add it to Wills Mountain State Park. However, they were unable to come to terms with Artmor's remaining shareholders. On November 11, 2015, the southern half of the former factory building was gutted by a fire set by a local youth. The loss was estimated to be $750,000.
