= Haystack Mountain (Maryland) =

Mountain in western Maryland, United States

Highest point
- Elevation: 1,706 ft (520 m)
- Prominence: 640 feet (200 m)
- Coordinates: 39°37′48″N 78°49′14″W

Geography
- Location: Allegany / Garrett counties, Maryland, U.S.
- Parent range: Allegheny Mountains, part of the Ridge-and-Valley Appalachians
- Topo map: USGS Cumberland

Climbing
- Easiest route: Drive

Haystack Mountain is a mountain ridge in the Ridge and Valley region of the Appalachian Mountains, located in western Maryland just west of the city of Cumberland. The mountain forms the southern wall of the Cumberland Narrows.

== Geography ==
Haystack Mountain rises just north of Cresaptown to the southwest of Cumberland and runs in a northeastward direction, achieving a height of 1,706 feet (520 m) before falling to a 1,200 feet (370 m) gap through which Interstate 68 passes. On the other side of the gap the mountain continues, noticeably lower in elevation, achieving a height of 1,480 feet (450 m) at its northern tip before falling precipitously into the Cumberland Narrows. Across the Narrows is Wills Mountain. Geologically, the two mountains are equivalent.

== History ==
The original route for the National Road ascended over Haystack Mountain, through the gap which I-68 now traverses, following an American Indian pathways known as Nemacolin's Path. This path was chosen by General Braddock during the French and Indian War, and was later used as part of the National Road. Remnants of the road can still be viewed today. This road was used by thousands of travelers who struggled to safely climb the mountain with their possessions stowed in creaky wagons. Travelers faced even greater dangers descending Haystack Mountain, due to its steeper grade, near present-day Sunset Drive. The road continued toward today's LaVale Plaza and ascended to the Clarysville Inn, an important wagon stand and stage house between LaVale, Maryland and Frostburg, Maryland. The National Highway (modern day U.S. Route 40) was later routed around Haystack Mountain through the Cumberland Narrows.
