= Cresaptown, Maryland =

- Census-designated place
- Location within the State of Maryland
- Coordinates: 39°35′40″N 78°50′08″W
- Country: United States
- State: Maryland
- County: Allegany

Area
  - Total: 2.76 sq mi (7.16 km^{2})
  - Land: 2.66 sq mi (6.88 km^{2})
  - Water: 0.11 sq mi (0.28 km^{2})
- Elevation: 781 ft (238 m)

Population (2020)
  - Total: 5,442
  - Density: 2,047.6/sq mi (790.58/km^{2})
- Time zone: UTC−5 (Eastern (EST))
  - Summer (DST): UTC−4 (EDT)
- ZIP code: 21502
- Area codes: 301, 240
- FIPS code: 24-20525
- GNIS feature ID: 2633177

Cresaptown is an unincorporated community and census-designated place (CDP) located in Allegany County, Maryland, United States. As of the 2010 census it had a population of 6,247. Prior to 2010 it was part of the Cresaptown-Bel Air CDP. Cresaptown's post office was established December 22, 1800. Cresaptown is located 6 miles (10 km) southwest of Cumberland.

== History ==
Prior to 1728, Cresaptown was the site of a Shawnee village along the Potomac River. The inhabitants of this region were a portion of the Shawanese tribe, a sub-division of the Algonquian group. The warriors engaged in hunting and fishing for food and furs, while their families were left at home to tend the maize and grass that grew in the rich soil of the Potomac valley. The maize was ground into corn meal and made into Shawnee cake, a popular diet of the Shawnees living in the valley.

The Shawanees in the valley lived in shelters composed of two forked posts that were driven into the ground, and on these was laid a ridge pole. Small saplings, cut to a length of about 8 feet (2.4 m), were laid against the pole, one end resting on the ground, forming a shelter similar to a V-shaped tent. This was covered with bark and skins and made tight enough to protect against rain or snow. The floors were spread with furs, which made sure for seats or beds. Emanuel Custer, father of George Armstrong Custer, was born in Cresaptown 1806, and moved to Ohio in 1845, finally settling in Michigan.

== Demographics ==
Historical population
Census	Pop.	Note	%±
2020	5,442		—
U.S. Decennial Census

=== 2020 census ===
As of the 2020 census, Cresaptown had a population of 5,442. The median age was 40.2 years. 8.6% of residents were under the age of 18 and 11.7% of residents were 65 years of age or older. For every 100 females there were 329.5 males, and for every 100 females age 18 and over there were 387.2 males age 18 and over.

98.2% of residents lived in urban areas, while 1.8% lived in rural areas.

There were 1,041 households in Cresaptown, of which 25.5% had children under the age of 18 living in them. Of all households, 48.0% were married-couple households, 13.5% were households with a male householder and no spouse or partner present, and 31.2% were households with a female householder and no spouse or partner present. About 31.0% of all households were made up of individuals and 15.9% had someone living alone who was 65 years of age or older.

There were 1,129 housing units, of which 7.8% were vacant. The homeowner vacancy rate was 1.5% and the rental vacancy rate was 7.9%.

Racial composition as of the 2020 census
Race	Number	Percent
White	2,876	52.8%
Black or African American	2,295	42.2%
American Indian and Alaska Native	20	0.4%
Asian	28	0.5%
Native Hawaiian and Other Pacific Islander	0	0.0%
Some other race	117	2.1%
Two or more races	106	1.9%
Hispanic or Latino (of any race)	135	2.5%

== Government and infrastructure ==
The Maryland Department of Corrections operates two prisons in the CDP: North Branch Correctional Institution and Western Correctional Institution. Additionally, the Allegany County Detention Center is in the CDP. North Branch is a supermax prison.

The 372nd Military Police Company, known for participating in Abu Ghraib prisoner abuse, was based here.

== Education ==
Allegany County Public Schools is the school district for the entire county, and covers the CDP.

== Nearby city ==
- Cumberland, Maryland

== See also ==
- Thomas Cresap
