= U.S. Route 40 Scenic =

Highway in Maryland

U.S. Route 40 Scenic
- Official US 40 Scenic highlighted in red; unofficial in blue

Route information
- Auxiliary route of US 40
- Maintained by MDSHA and Washington County
- Length: 9.50 mi (15.29 km) Officially referenced length; signed length is 16.1 miles (25.9 km) eastbound and 17.5 miles (28.2 km) westbound
- Existed: 1965–present
- Tourist routes: Historic National Road

Major junctions
- West end: Fifteen Mile Creek Road in Green Ridge State Forest
- I-68 / US 40 in multiple locations
- East end: MD 144 near Hancock

Location
- Country: United States
- State: Maryland
- Counties: Allegany, Washington

Highway system
- United States Numbered Highway System; List; Special; Divided; Maryland highway system; Interstate; US; State; Scenic Byways

U.S. Route 40 Scenic (US 40 Scenic) is a scenic route of US 40 in the U.S. state of Maryland. US 40 Scenic, which is known for most of its route as National Pike, is the old alignment of US 40 over Town Hill in eastern Allegany County and Sideling Hill in far western Washington County. The highway was originally constructed as part of a turnpike connecting Baltimore with the eastern end of the National Road at Cumberland in the early 19th century. The highway was paved as a modern road in the mid-1910s and designated US 40 in the late 1920s. US 40 was relocated over Sideling Hill in the early 1950s and over Town Hill in the mid-1960s. The US 40 Scenic designation was first applied to the old highway over Town Hill in 1965. Following the completion of Interstate 68 (I-68) at Sideling Hill, US 40 Scenic was extended east along old US 40's crossing of the mountain in the late 1980s. US 40 Scenic is the only scenic route in the U.S. Highway System; formerly, there was a second, US 412 Scenic in Oklahoma, but this has since been redesignated to a more conventional "Alternate" route.

The scenic route includes an officially referenced and fully state-maintained section that runs 9.50 miles (15.29 km) from Fifteen Mile Creek Road in Green Ridge State Forest near Exit 62 of I-68 and US 40 to the Washington County line within eastern Allegany County. US 40 Scenic also includes an unofficial but signed section in western Washington County that has a concurrency with I-68 and has sections maintained by the Maryland State Highway Administration and Washington County. The solely signed section runs from the official section at High Germany Road near I-68 Exit 72 just west of the Allegany–Washington county line east to MD 144 near I-68 Exit 77 west of Hancock. The signed section between Fifteen Mile Creek Road and MD 144 is 16.1 miles (25.9 km) eastbound and 17.5 miles (28.2 km) westbound. The difference in mileage is due to the westbound scenic route following Mountain Road, which is unsigned MD 903, to its entrance to I-68.

== Route description ==
US 40 Scenic begins as Fifteen Mile Creek Road on the edge of Green Ridge State Forest 0.05 miles (0.080 km) south of the eastbound ramps for Exit 62 of I-68 and US 40 (National Freeway). Fifteen Mile Creek Road continues south as an unimproved road through Green Ridge State Forest. US 40 Scenic passes over I-68 and passes by the westbound Exit 62 ramps before intersecting the eastern end of MD 144 (Old National Pike), which heads west as the local complement to the National Freeway. The scenic route continues as National Pike, crosses Fifteenmile Creek, then makes a sharp curve to the east, intersecting another section of Fifteen Mile Creek Road and beginning the short climb to the top of Green Ridge. After a short descent, the highway begins its curvy ascent of Town Hill, which has no climbing lanes. US 40 Scenic, which passes through the Billmeyer Wildlife Management Area, descends the mountain to the community of Piney Grove, where the highway intersects Orleans Road. At Mann Road, the highway turns south to cross over I-68. The scenic route turns east again at Turkey Farm Road and parallels the eastbound side of I-68 until the highway reaches High Germany Road, which is unsigned MD 948Y, in the hamlet of Bellegrove.

The referenced portion of US 40 Scenic continues east to its official terminus at Sideling Hill Creek at the Washington County line. Signed US 40 Scenic turns north onto High Germany Road and joins I-68 in a concurrency at Exit 72. The scenic route crosses Sideling Hill Creek into Washington County and begins its ascent of Sideling Hill on I-68. US 40 Scenic exits I-68 at Exit 74, a partial interchange (eastbound exit and westbound entrance) on the western slope of the mountain. Eastbound US 40 Scenic exits the freeway on a sweeping curve ramp that ends at the southern end of Mountain Road. Mountain Road is a two-lane road that heads north as a state highway, signed as US 40 Scenic west and unsigned as 0.91-mile (1.46 km) long MD 903. MD 903's northern terminus is at US 40 Scenic's ramp onto westbound I-68.

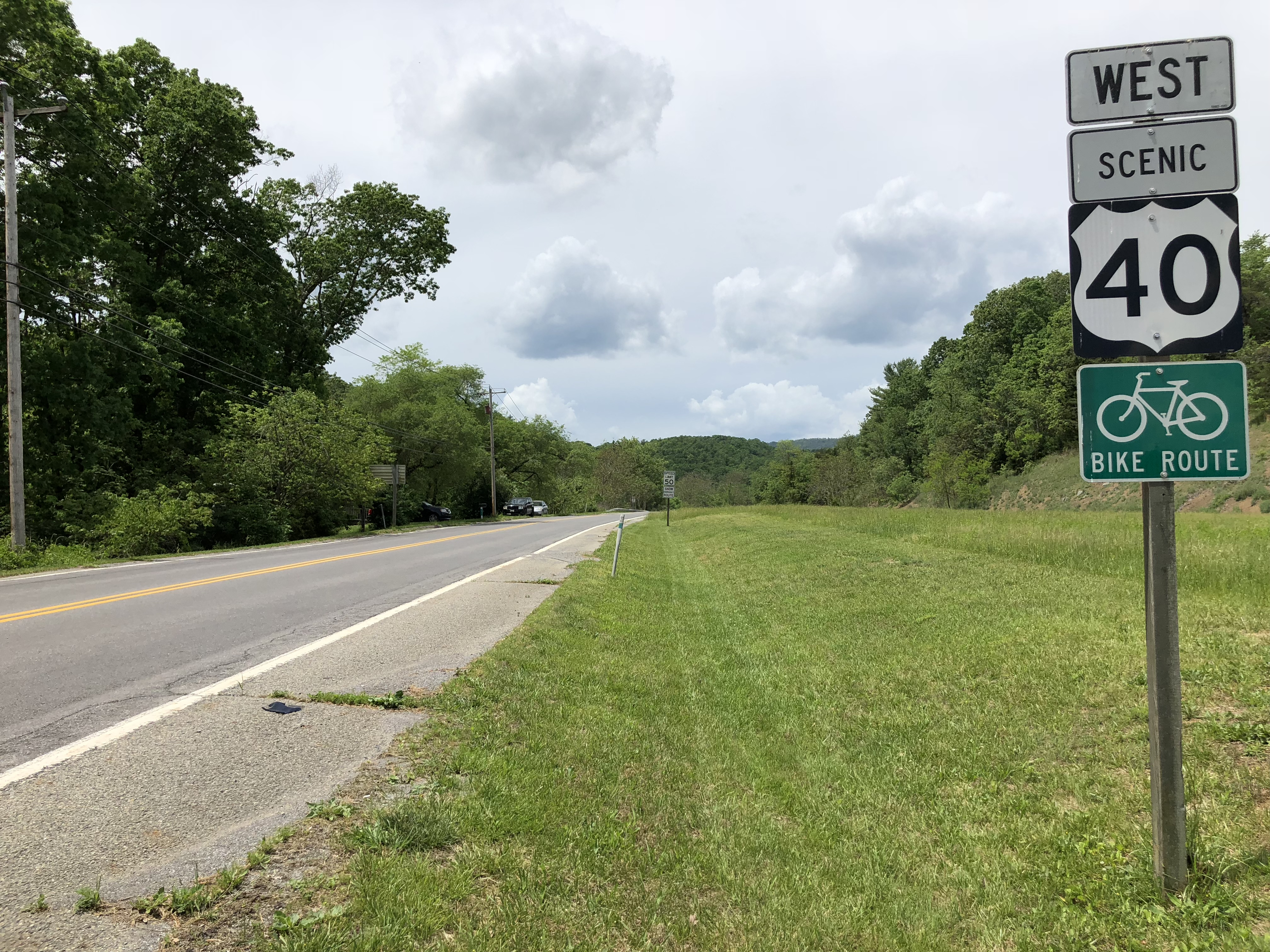
View west from the east end of the county-maintained portion of US 40 Scenic at MD 144 west of Hancock

US 40 Scenic continues south as National Pike from the junction of its two directions as a county-maintained, three-lane road, two lanes eastbound and one lane westbound, ascending Sideling Hill. During the climb, the scenic route intersects McFarland Road, the original alignment of US 40 that heads west to the official eastern terminus of US 40 Scenic. As US 40 Scenic approaches the top of Sideling Hill, the eastbound climbing lane ends. The scenic route makes a hairpin turn to the north and begins to descend the mountain, again a three-lane road but with two lanes westbound. US 40 Scenic curves to the east and then to the southeast, paralleling and gradually approaching I-68. The westbound climbing lane ends just west of the scenic route's eastern terminus at MD 144 (Western Pike) just south of I-68 Exit 77.

== History ==
US 40 Scenic is the old alignment of US 40 over Town Hill and Sideling Hill, two of the many north–south ridges of the Ridge-and-Valley Appalachians between Cumberland and Hancock that needed to be crossed first by the Baltimore and Cumberland Turnpike, then US 40, and most recently I-68. The portion of US 40 Scenic from its western terminus over Town Hill to Sideling Hill Creek follows the original alignment of the turnpike and US 40 except for deviations at both ends due to construction of the new alignments of US 40 and I-68. The Baltimore and Cumberland Turnpike and later US 40 rose abruptly from Sideling Hill Creek to climb the west flank of Sideling Hill, following what is today McFarland Road east, turning south at Hixon Road, and continuing south along the same line, now abandoned, to join the present line at the top of the mountain. On the east flank, the old road began along the current alignment, then turned east a short distance south of the present curve to the east for a steeper descent that followed Western Pike before joining the present alignment a short distance west of MD 144.

The original state road between Cumberland and Hancock was paved from Fifteen Mile Creek to Green Ridge in 1913, Green Ridge to Sideling Hill Creek in 1915, and from Sideling Hill Creek to the modern MD 144 junction in 1914. Early improvements to the state road included a new bridge over Fifteen Mile Creek in 1917, a new bridge over Sideling Hill Creek in 1925, and the modification of a nasty curve just east of the new Sideling Creek Bridge at the same time. The road became part of US 40 in 1927. The highway was widened and curves banked and modified in 1929 and 1930 as part of improvements over 47 miles (76 km) of US 40 between Cumberland and Hagerstown. Passing lanes 800 to 1,000 feet (240 to 300 m) in length were added on Sideling Hill around 1942.

Despite the improvements, Sideling Hill remained a formidable obstacle to traffic between Cumberland and Hancock until a construction project began in 1949 to build a new highway over the mountain. US 40 was relocated for 6.94 miles (11.17 km) from just west of Sideling Hill Creek east over the mountain to just west of the modern MD 144 intersection. The relocation involved a box culvert over Little Bear Creek and a high level bridge over Sideling Hill Creek. The new roadway was held to a maximum gradient of 6 percent and had a third climbing lane for 90 percent of the length of the relocation. By the time the project was completed in 1952, over 1,300,000 cubic yards (990,000 m^{3}) of earth had been excavated.

US 40 Scenic was assigned to old US 40 from Fifteen Mile Creek Road over Town Hill to the Mann Road intersection when US 40 was moved to its and I-68's present alignment over Town Hill in 1965. US 40 was expanded to a divided highway and moved to a new alignment from High Germany Road to the sweeping curve that is now Exit 74 in 1983. The section of old US 40 from the 1949–1952 Sideling Hill relocation immediately around Sideling Hill Creek was dismantled. The upgraded US 40 became a part of I-68 that passes through a cut in Sideling Hill around 1987. The old alignment over Sideling Hill was transferred to county maintenance and designated US 40 Scenic around 1989. However, US 40 Scenic temporarily followed the old McFarland Road alignment of US 40 on the west side of Sideling Hill until the completion of Exit 74 in 1991.

== Junction list ==
The entire officially referenced portion of US 40 Scenic is in a sparsely populated area of eastern Allegany County.

mi	km	Destinations	Notes
0.00	0.00	Fifteen Mile Creek Road south – Green Ridge State Forest	Western terminus
0.18	0.29	I-68 / US 40 (National Freeway) – Cumberland, Hancock	I-68 Exit 62
0.27	0.43	MD 144 west (Old National Pike) – Flintstone	Old alignment of US 40
5.77	9.29	Orleans Road south to I-68 / US 40	Unsigned MD 948Z
5.86	9.43	Orleans Road north	To PA 26
7.23	11.64	Mann Road north	US 40 Scenic turns south at this intersection
7.32	11.78	Turkey Farm Road west	US 40 Scenic turns east at this intersection
8.78	14.13	High Germany Road north to I-68 / US 40	The official and signed portions of US 40 Scenic split at this intersection.
9.50	15.29	Bridge over Sideling Hill Creek	Washington County line; official eastern terminus
1.000 mi = 1.609 km; 1.000 km = 0.621 mi
