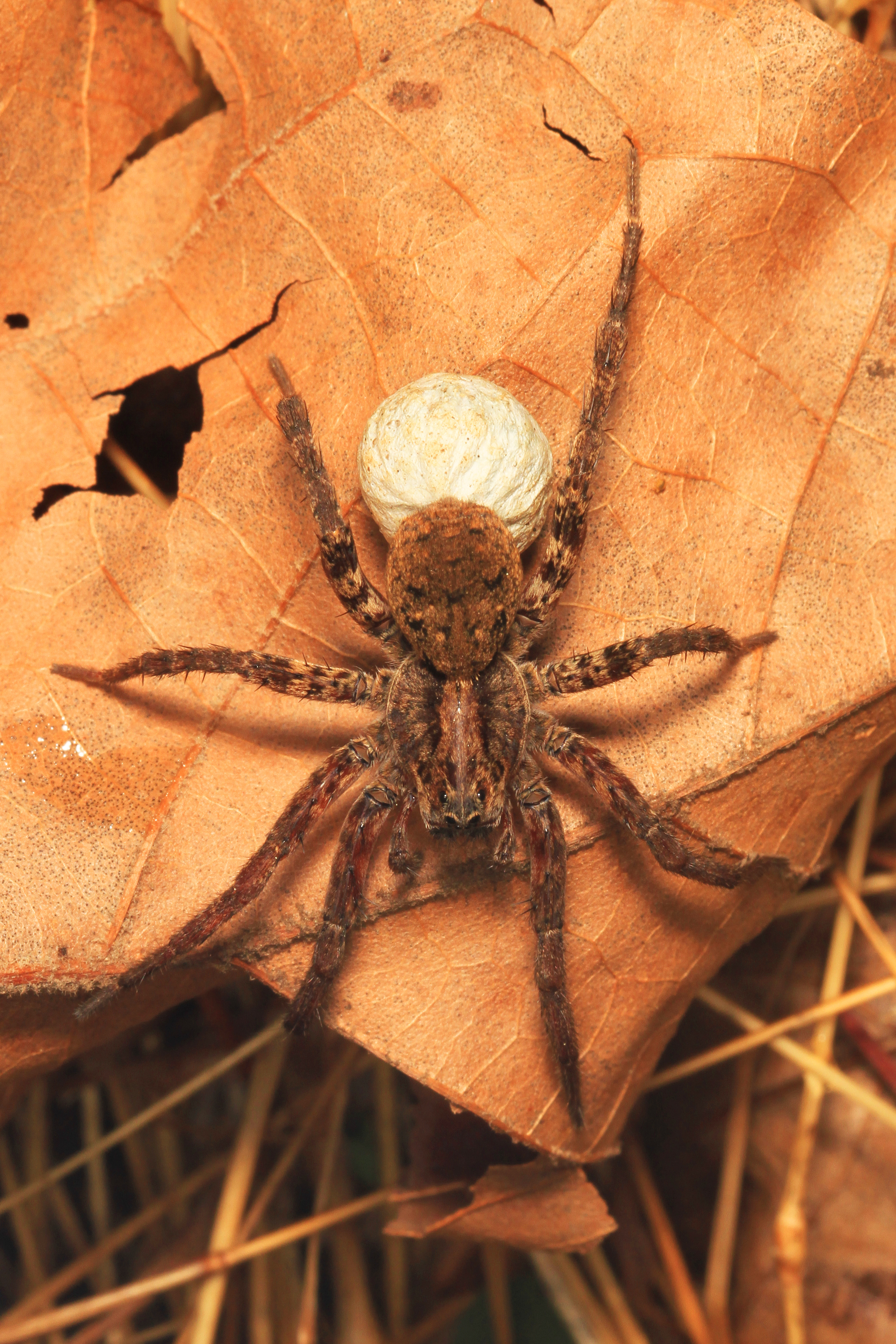
- Gladicosa gulosa from Green Ridge State Forest, Flintstone, Maryland
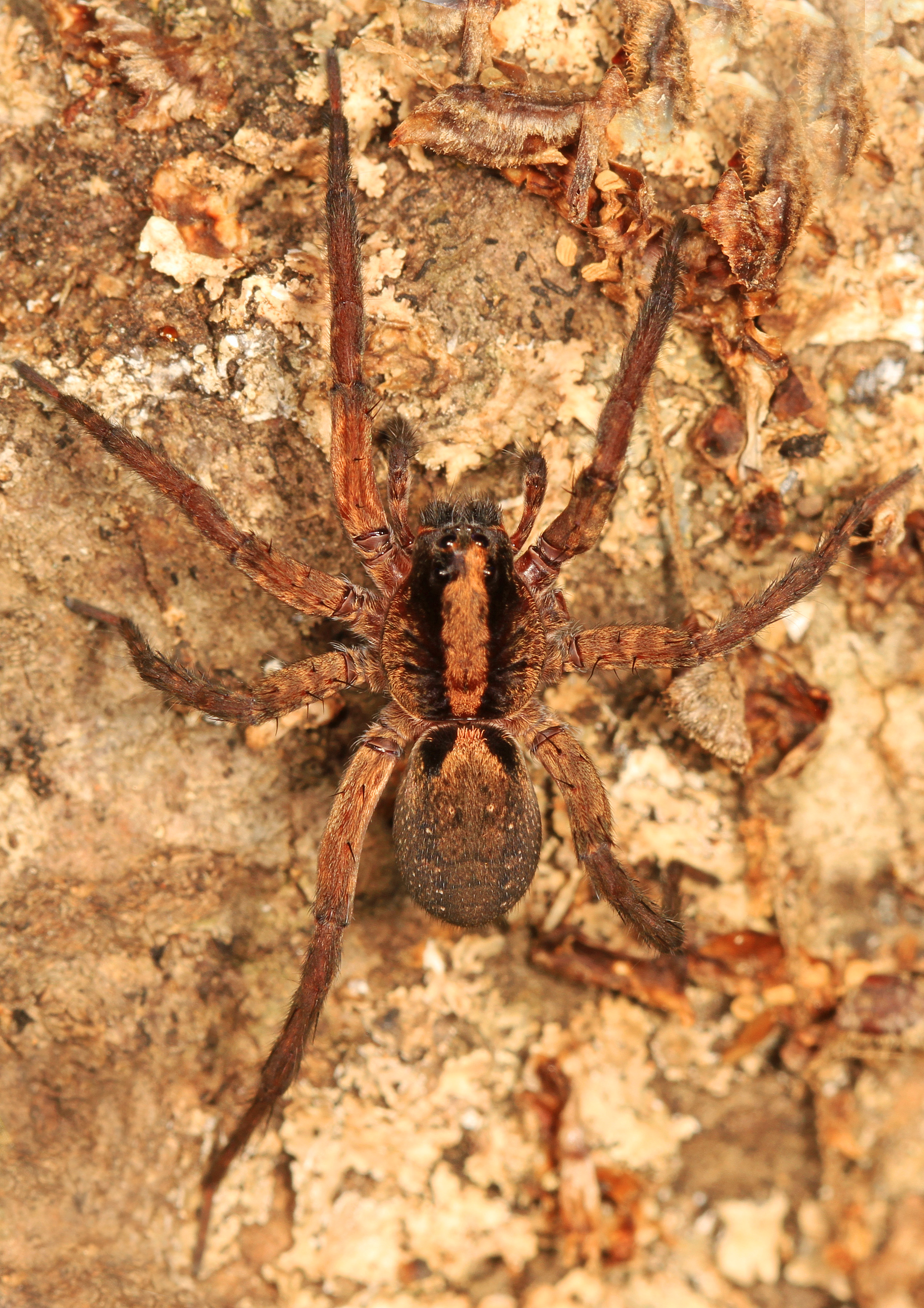
- Gladicosa gulosa near Leesville, Louisiana

Scientific classification
- Kingdom: Animalia
- Phylum: Arthropoda
- Subphylum: Chelicerata
- Class: Arachnida
- Order: Araneae
- Infraorder: Araneomorphae
- Family: Lycosidae
- Genus: Gladicosa
- Species: G. gulosa

Binomial name
- Gladicosa gulosa (Walckenaer, 1837)

Synonyms
- Lycosa gulosa Walckenaer, 1837; Leimonia gulosa (Walckenaer, 1837); Lycosa kochii Emerton, 1885; Lycosa nigraurata Montgomery, 1902; Lycosa purcelli Montgomery, 1902; Trochosa purcelli (Montgomery, 1902); Varacosa gulosa (Walckenaer, 1837)

= Gladicosa gulosa =

Species of spider

Gladicosa gulosa (the drumming sword wolf spider) is a type of wolf spider found, among other habits, in Beech-Maple forests of the US and Canada, where the spider can be found in the plant strata of ground, herb or shrub.

== Life cycle ==
This spider is nocturnal and hides during the day. It makes no web or shelter of any kind and hides under leaves in the day. The female carries its eggs in a spherical sac until they hatch, after which the spiderlings may ride on the female until able to fend for themselves.
