= Maryland Route 736 =

State highway in Maryland, United States

Maryland Route 736
- Maryland Route 736 highlighted in red

Route information
- Maintained by MDSHA
- Length: 1.58 mi (2.54 km)
- Existed: 1998–present

Major junctions
- South end: Shaft Road in Midlothian
- I-68 / US 40 near Midlothian
- North end: Park Avenue in Frostburg

Location
- Country: United States
- State: Maryland
- Counties: Allegany

Highway system
- Maryland highway system; Interstate; US; State; Scenic Byways
← MD 735	→ MD 739

Maryland Route 736 (MD 736) is an unsigned state highway in the U.S. state of Maryland. Known for much of its length as Midlothian Road, the state highway runs 1.58 miles (2.54 km) from Shaft Road in Midlothian north to Park Avenue in Frostburg in northwestern Allegany County. MD 736 connects Interstate 68 (I-68) and U.S. Route 40 (US 40) with Frostburg State University. The former county highway was relocated when its interchange with I-68 was completed in the mid-1970s. The highway was designated MD 736 in 1998. MD 736 was extended south from I-68 to Shaft Road in 2013.

== Route description ==
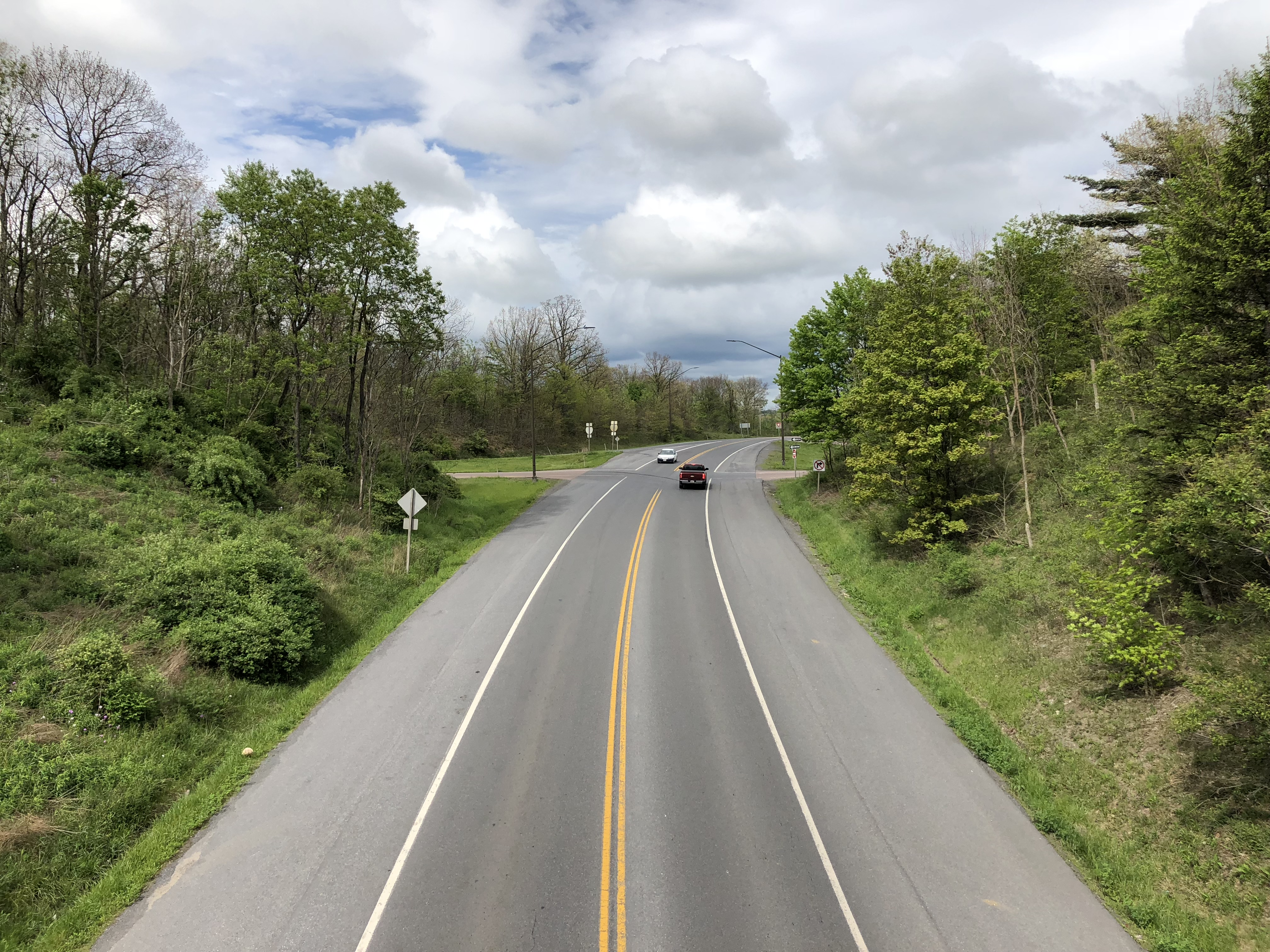
View north along MD 736 from I-68/US 40 near Midlothian

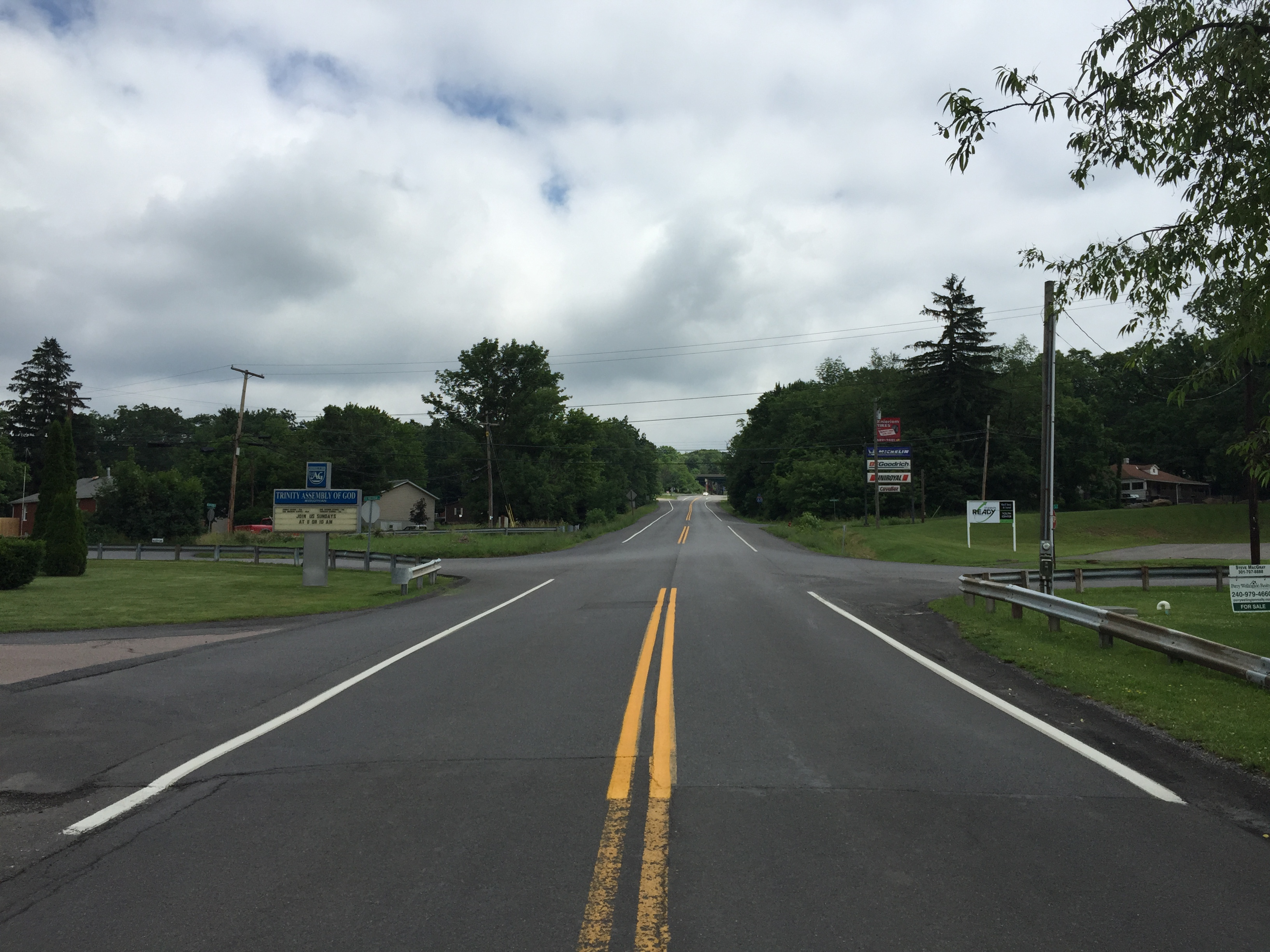
View north from the south end of MD 736 at Shaft Road in Midlothian

MD 736 begins at Shaft Road in the village of Midlothian, heading northeast as two-lane undivided Midlothian Road. Past this intersection, Old Legislative Road continues southwest as a county highway toward Midland. The route continues to a diamond interchange with I-68 and US 40 (National Freeway). Two-lane undivided MD 736 heads northeast into the city of Frostburg, becoming Braddock Road at Braddock Street, the old alignment of Midlothian Road. MD 736 passes the Appalachian Laboratory of the University of Maryland Center for Environmental Science before reaching University Drive, where the campus of Frostburg State University begins to line the southbound direction of the state highway. MD 736 crosses Sand Spring Run before reaching its northern terminus at an intersection with Park Avenue and Bowery Street. Bowery Street is one-way southbound toward the intersection while Park Avenue headed northwest is one-way westbound away from the intersection.

== History ==
Midlothian Road is a long-time link between Frostburg and Midlothian. In the early 1970s, the county highway was relocated around the highway's interchange with I-68, which was completed around 1974. MD 736 was assigned to Midlothian Road and Braddock Road in 1998. MD 736 was extended south from I-68 to Shaft Road in 2013 when it was determined that section of Midlothian Road was the responsibility of the Maryland State Highway Administration.

== Junction list ==
The entire route is in Allegany County.

Location	mi	km	Destinations	Notes
Midlothian	0.00	0.00	Shaft Road / Old Legislative Road south	Southern terminus
Midlothian	0.31	0.50	I-68 / US 40 (National Freeway) – Cumberland, Morgantown	I-68 Exit 33
Frostburg	1.58	2.54	Park Avenue	Northern terminus
1.000 mi = 1.609 km; 1.000 km = 0.621 mi
