= Midlothian, Maryland =

- Census-designated place
- Location within the State of Maryland Midlothian (the United States)
- Coordinates: 39°37′30″N 78°57′02″W
- Country: United States
- State: Maryland
- County: Allegany

Area
  - Total: 0.69 sq mi (1.80 km^{2})
  - Land: 0.69 sq mi (1.80 km^{2})
  - Water: 0 sq mi (0.00 km^{2})
- Elevation: 1,903 ft (580 m)

Population (2020)
  - Total: 352
  - Density: 507.7/sq mi (196.01/km^{2})
- Time zone: UTC−5 (Eastern (EST))
  - Summer (DST): UTC−4 (EDT)
- ZIP code: 21543
- FIPS code: 24-52525
- GNIS feature ID: 2583658

Midlothian is an unincorporated community and census-designated place (CDP) in Allegany County, Maryland, United States; at one time it was called Midlothian Junction. As of the 2010 census it had a population of 320. Its ZIP code is 21543.

Midlothian is located 2 miles (3 km) southwest of Frostburg and is adjacent to Exit 33 of Interstate 68. The community sits along the eastern base of Big Savage Mountain.

Also known as Midlothian Junction, it has a population of 320 in 2010. It was primarily settled by Scotch immigrants, and named after a region near Edinburgh.

== History ==
The village of Midlothian was the site of the Bowery iron furnaces. These were two coal-fired furnaces built in 1868 by Cumberland Coal and Iron. There was a source of carbonate iron ore on the hill to the northeast, tapped by a tram road. Limestone was available from a hill to the east. The furnaces produced pig iron, and operated from 1874 to 1880. The pig iron was shipped by rail on the C&P via a spur line off the main. The product went to Cumberland.

From Midlothian Junction, the C&P made a connection with a logging railroad. The Juniata Lumber Company established a circular sawmill in Midlothian, at the end of a 3-foot gauge line that extended 12 miles into Garrett County along Big Savage Mountain. A Class-B Climax geared engine was used to haul the logs. From the sawmill, the lumber was shipped in boxcars over the Cumberland & Pennsylvania Railroad. Twenty-five thousand board feet per day of railroad ties and dimensioned wood were produced at peak production. The sawmill facility was closed by 1913.

== Demographics ==
Historical population
Census	Pop.	Note	%±
2020	352		—
U.S. Decennial Census
