= Billmeyer Wildlife Management Area =

State Wildlife Management Area in Allegany County, Maryland

- IUCN category V (protected landscape/seascape)
- Location within Maryland
- Location: Allegany, Maryland, United States
- Coordinates: 39°40′36″N 78°25′56″W
- Operator: Maryland Department of Natural Resources
- Website: Billmeyer WMA

Billmeyer Wildlife Management Area is a Wildlife Management Area in Allegany County, Maryland adjacent to Green Ridge State Forest. Established in the 1920s for production of game birds, particularly turkeys, the 758-acre (307 ha) area is managed for general recreation and hunting pursuits. It is listed on the IUCN database as a Type V protected landscape.
