= Gladicosa pulchra =

Scientific classification
- Kingdom: Animalia
- Phylum: Arthropoda
- Subphylum: Chelicerata
- Class: Arachnida
- Order: Araneae
- Infraorder: Araneomorphae
- Family: Lycosidae
- Genus: Gladicosa
- Species: G. pulchra

Binomial name
- Gladicosa pulchra (Keyserling, 1877)

Species of spider

Gladicosa pulchra is a species of wolf spider in the family Lycosidae. Its primary geographic range includes the mid-Atlantic, southeastern, and south-central United States of America, where it can found on tree trunks and under logs or rocks.
