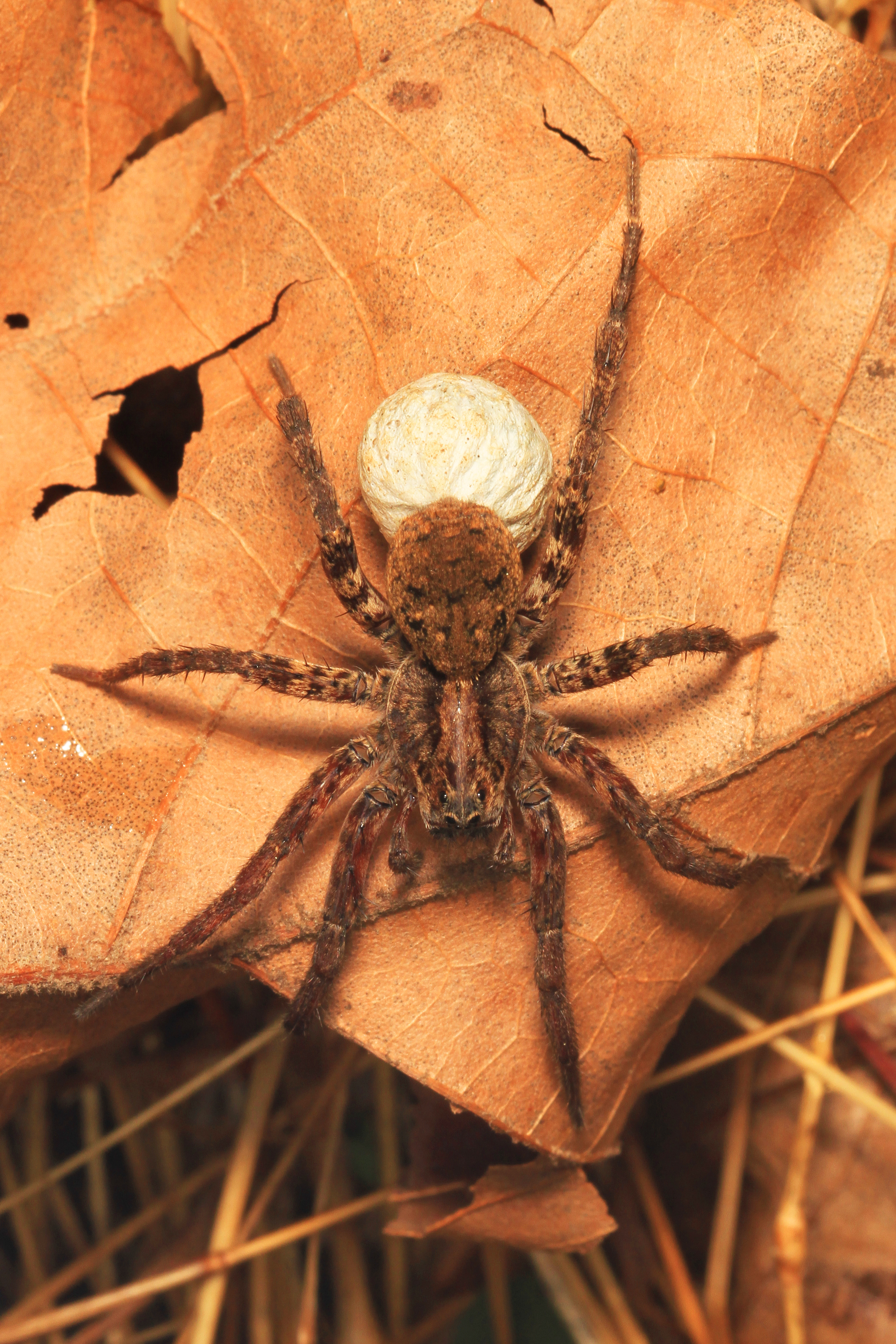
- G. gulosa

Scientific classification
- Kingdom: Animalia
- Phylum: Arthropoda
- Subphylum: Chelicerata
- Class: Arachnida
- Order: Araneae
- Infraorder: Araneomorphae
- Family: Lycosidae
- Genus: Gladicosa; Brady, 1987

= Gladicosa =

Genus of spiders

Gladicosa is a genus of wolf spiders found in the United States and Canada.

== Species ==
As of April 2016, the World Spider Catalog accepted the following species:

- Gladicosa bellamyi (Gertsch & Wallace, 1937) – USA
- Gladicosa euepigynata (Montgomery, 1904) – USA
- Gladicosa gulosa (Walckenaer, 1837) (type species) – USA, Canada
- Gladicosa huberti (Chamberlin, 1924) – USA
- Gladicosa pulchra (Keyserling, 1877) – USA
