= Hazelton, West Virginia =

- Unincorporated community
- Location within West Virginia Location within the United States
- Coordinates: 39°39′13″N 79°31′50″W
- Country: United States
- State: West Virginia
- County: Preston
- Elevation: 1,873 ft (571 m)
- Time zone: UTC-5 (Eastern (EST))
  - Summer (DST): UTC-4 (EDT)
- Area codes: 304 & 681
- GNIS feature ID: 1540100

Hazelton is an unincorporated community in Preston County, West Virginia, United States. Hazelton is located along Interstate 68, just east of Bruceton Mills.

The United States Penitentiary, Hazelton, a high-security federal prison, is located in northern Hazelton.
