= Keysers Ridge, Maryland =

Unincorporated community in Maryland, United States

- Unincorporated community
- Location within Maryland Location within the United States
- Coordinates: 39°41′37″N 79°14′53″W
- Country: United States
- State: Maryland
- County: Garrett
- Elevation: 2,894 ft (882 m)
- Time zone: UTC-5 (Eastern (EST))
  - Summer (DST): UTC-4 (EDT)
- GNIS feature ID: 585303

Keysers Ridge is an unincorporated community in northern Garrett County, Maryland, United States. Named after William Keyser, vice president of the Baltimore & Ohio Railroad at the time, it lies to the west of Grantsville on Interstate 68 and is bounded to the northwest by the Savage River State Forest. Keysers Ridge is home to one of the most important interchanges in Garrett county. This includes the junction of U.S. 219, U.S. 40, U.S. 40 ALT, and Interstate 68. It is also at this point where U.S. 219 joins and heads east with I-68 and U.S. 40 East, Before spurring off at exit 22, continuing North to Meyersdale PA.In the past, Keysers Ridge was feared by travelers on the National Road due to its very harsh weather conditions as a result of its location at the top of a ridge to the west of Negro Mountain. The most snowfall ever recorded in a single winter in Maryland was during the winter of 2009–10, when 262.5 inches of snow fell at Keysers Ridge. It is also home to a little sandys restaurant, two gas stations, and one of three McDonalds in the county.
