= Hancock, Maryland =

- Town
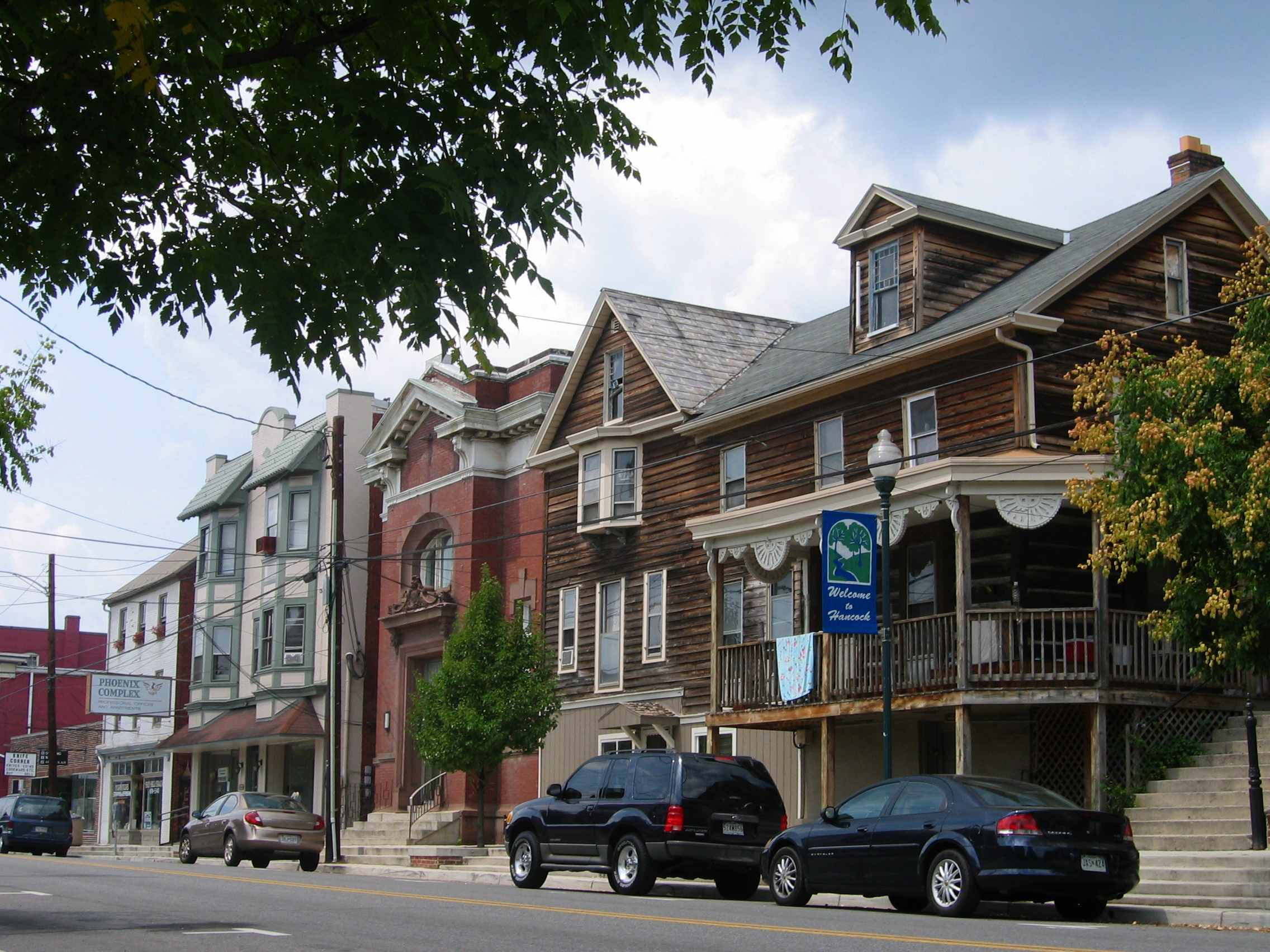
- Main Street in Hancock in 2006

- Flag Seal

- Location of Hancock in Maryland and in Washington County
- Coordinates: 39°42′23″N 78°10′32″W
- Country: United States
- State: Maryland
- County: Washington
- Incorporated: 1853

Area
  - Total: 3.00 sq mi (7.78 km^{2})
  - Land: 2.98 sq mi (7.73 km^{2})
  - Water: 0.019 sq mi (0.05 km^{2})
- Elevation: 564 ft (172 m)

Population (2020)
  - Total: 1,557
  - Density: 522/sq mi (201.5/km^{2})
- Time zone: UTC-5 (Eastern (EST))
  - Summer (DST): UTC-4 (EDT)
- ZIP code: 21750
- Area codes: 301, 240
- FIPS code: 24-36600
- GNIS feature ID: 2390229
- Website: townofhancock.org

Hancock is a town in Washington County, Maryland, United States. The population was 1,557 at the 2020 census. The Western Maryland community is notable for being located at the narrowest part of the state. The north–south distance from the Pennsylvania state line to the West Virginia state line is only 1.8 miles (2.9 km) at Hancock.

== History ==
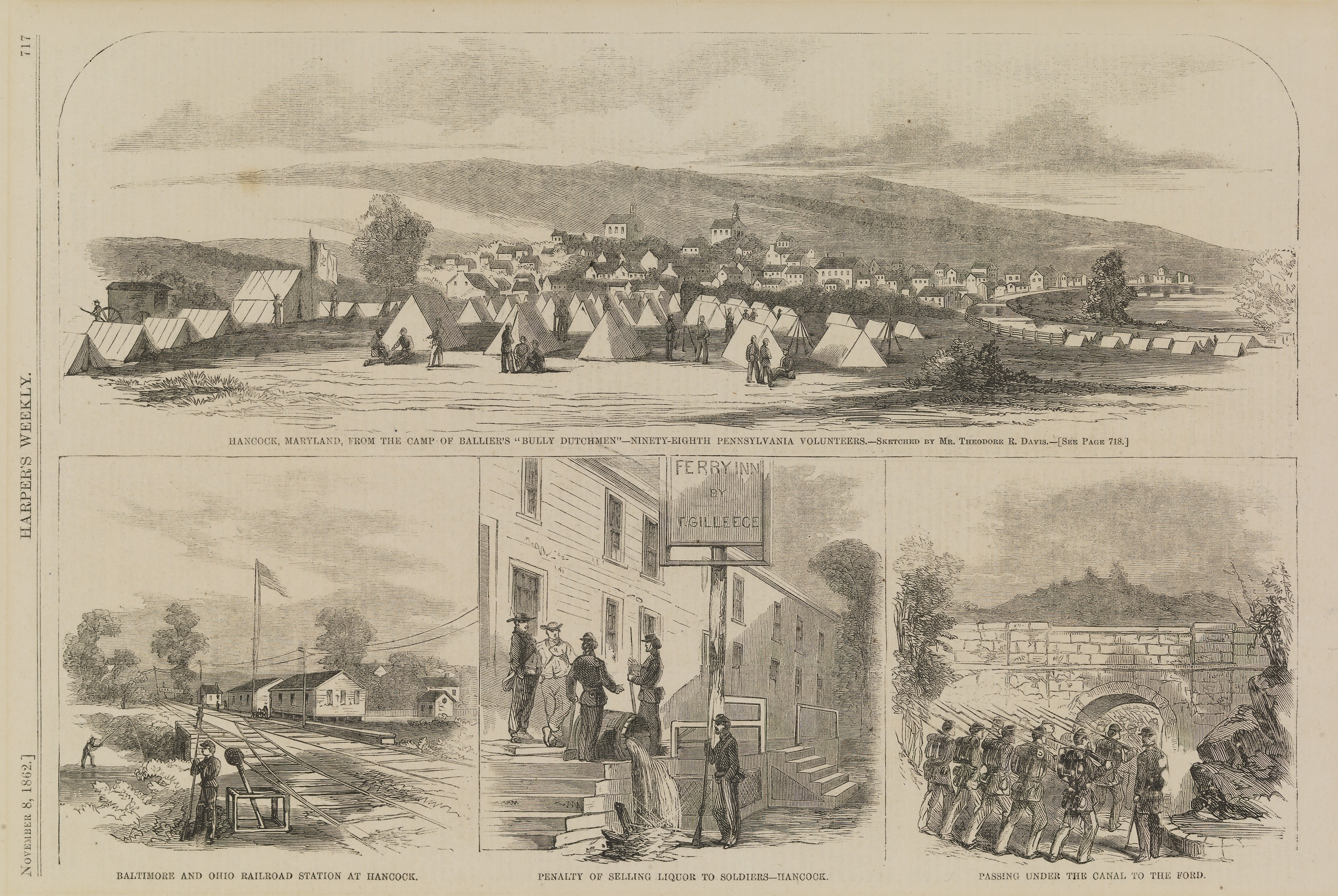
An illustration of Hancock, Maryland, in the November 8, 1862, edition of Harper's Weekly

Prior to the current name, the settlement was named "William's Town" for William McClary. The name Hancock comes from Edward Joseph Hancock, Jr., who fought alongside George Washington during the American Revolutionary War. Individuals began settling in the area of modern-day Hancock during the 1730s. During the Civil War, on January 5, 1862, General Stonewall Jackson began a siege of the town, but did not succeed due to weather conditions.

== Geography ==
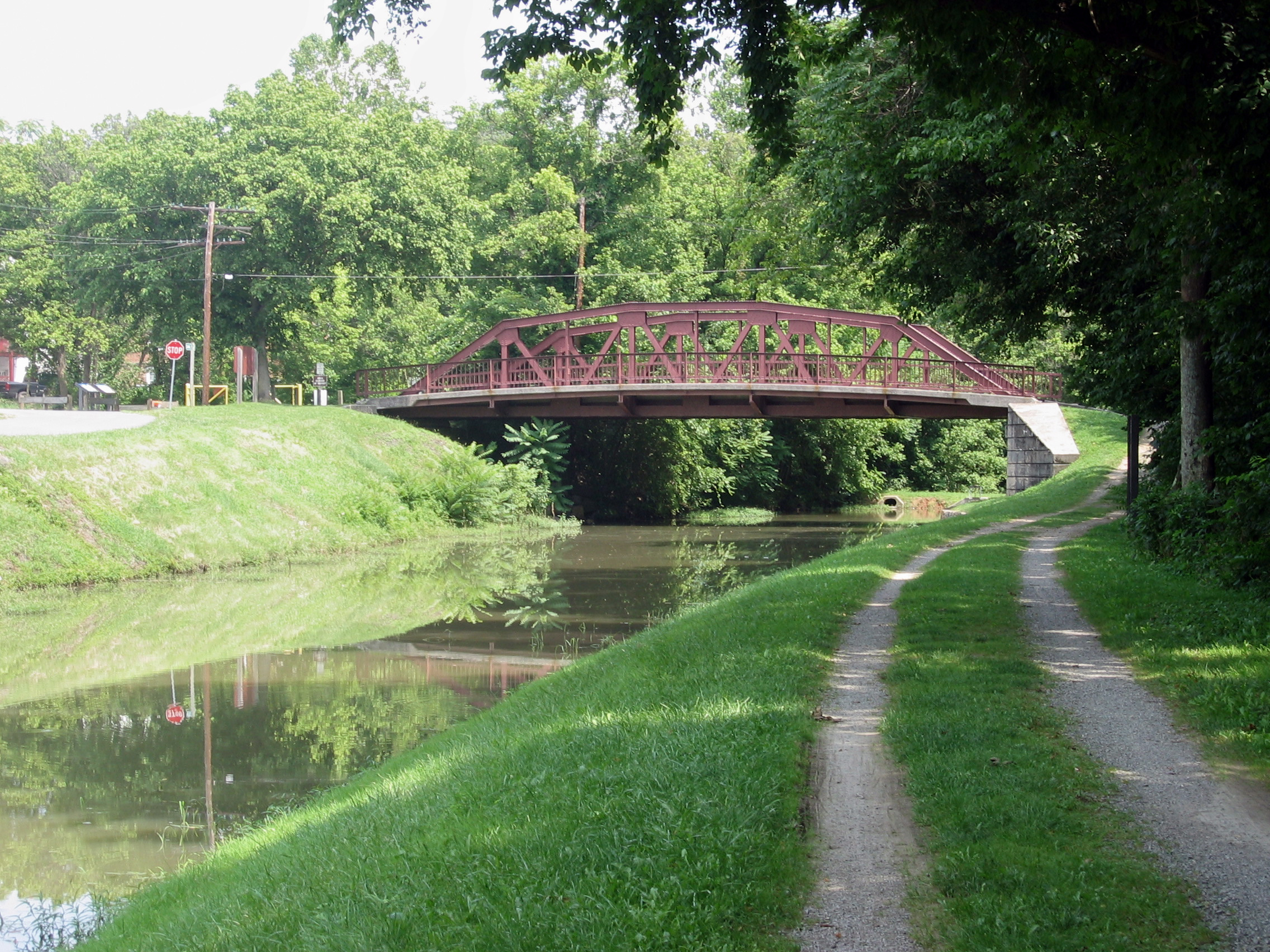
The Chesapeake and Ohio Canal

According to the United States Census Bureau, the town has a total area of 2.75 square miles (7.12 km^{2}), of which 2.73 square miles (7.07 km^{2}) is land and 0.02 square miles (0.05 km^{2}) is water.

The state of Maryland narrows to a width of less than two miles (3 km) in the Hancock area—the smallest non-vertex border-to-border distance of any U.S. state.

The Chesapeake and Ohio Canal passes through the town, and the Western Maryland Rail Trail connects Hancock with Fort Frederick State Park.

The main entrance waterways to the town's periphery are Licking Creek to the east and Sideling Hill Creek along the Washington-Allegany county line to the west.

=== Climate ===
The climate in this area is characterized by hot, humid summers and generally mild to cool winters. According to the Köppen Climate Classification system, Hancock has a humid subtropical climate, abbreviated "Cfa" on climate maps.

Climate data for Hancock, Maryland
Month	Jan	Feb	Mar	Apr	May	Jun	Jul	Aug	Sep	Oct	Nov	Dec	Year
Record high °F (°C)	76 (24)	81 (27)	93 (34)	94 (34)	100 (38)	98 (37)	105 (41)	102 (39)	103 (39)	98 (37)	86 (30)	77 (25)	105 (41)
Mean daily maximum °F (°C)	39 (4)	43 (6)	54 (12)	65 (18)	74 (23)	82 (28)	86 (30)	84 (29)	78 (26)	67 (19)	55 (13)	44 (7)	64 (18)
Mean daily minimum °F (°C)	19 (−7)	23 (−5)	30 (−1)	38 (3)	47 (8)	57 (14)	62 (17)	60 (16)	53 (12)	40 (4)	32 (0)	25 (−4)	41 (5)
Record low °F (°C)	−27 (−33)	−14 (−26)	−4 (−20)	15 (−9)	26 (−3)	33 (1)	40 (4)	33 (1)	25 (−4)	16 (−9)	8 (−13)	−19 (−28)	−27 (−33)
Average precipitation inches (mm)	2.73 (69)	2.23 (57)	3.17 (81)	3.20 (81)	4.03 (102)	3.38 (86)	3.81 (97)	3.28 (83)	3.21 (82)	3.24 (82)	3.09 (78)	2.69 (68)	38.06 (966)
Average snowfall inches (cm)	9.7 (25)	8.1 (21)	5.2 (13)	0.4 (1.0)	0 (0)	0 (0)	0 (0)	0 (0)	0 (0)	0 (0)	1.5 (3.8)	4.3 (11)	29.2 (74.8)

== Transportation ==
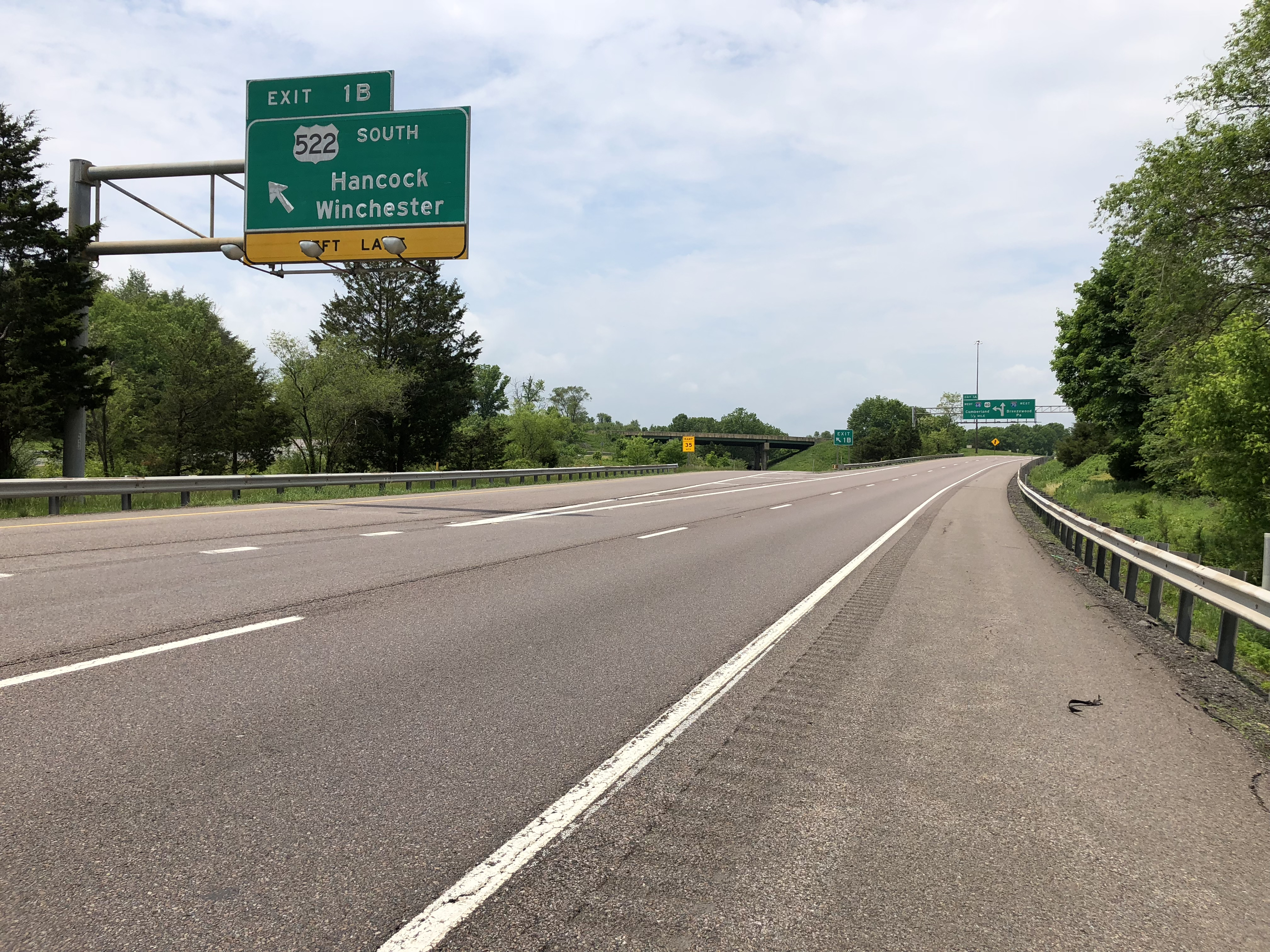
I-70/US 40 westbound at the exit for US 522 south in Hancock

=== Highways ===
The primary means of travel to and from Hancock is by road. Interstate 70 is the main highway serving the town. I-70 continues east to Baltimore and west to the southern suburbs of Pittsburgh. U.S. Route 40 runs concurrently with I-70 through the town, but just to the northwest, splits with I-70 to follow Interstate 68 westward towards Cumberland. U.S. Route 522 also traverses Hancock, heading northwest with I-70 into Pennsylvania and southward into eastern West Virginia towards Winchester, Virginia. Within the town, Maryland Route 144 serves as a local service route, following Main Street.

=== Public transport ===
Greyhound and Bay Runner Shuttle serve the town's truck plaza. Bay Runner provides shuttle service to BWI Airport.

== Demographics ==
Historical population
Census	Pop.	Note	%±
1880	931		—
1890	815		−12.5%
1900	824		1.1%
1910	893		8.4%
1920	972		8.8%
1930	947		−2.6%
1940	940		−0.7%
1950	963		2.4%
1960	2,004		108.1%
1970	1,881		−6.1%
1980	1,887		0.3%
1990	1,926		2.1%
2000	1,725		−10.4%
2010	1,545		−10.4%
2020	1,557		0.8%
U.S. Decennial Census

=== 2020 census ===
As of the 2020 census, Hancock had a population of 1,557. The median age was 42.6 years. 20.0% of residents were under the age of 18 and 21.6% of residents were 65 years of age or older. For every 100 females there were 92.7 males, and for every 100 females age 18 and over there were 92.7 males age 18 and over.

0.0% of residents lived in urban areas, while 100.0% lived in rural areas.

There were 732 households in Hancock, of which 23.9% had children under the age of 18 living in them. Of all households, 33.5% were married-couple households, 24.5% were households with a male householder and no spouse or partner present, and 32.0% were households with a female householder and no spouse or partner present. About 41.2% of all households were made up of individuals and 18.0% had someone living alone who was 65 years of age or older.

There were 839 housing units, of which 12.8% were vacant. The homeowner vacancy rate was 3.1% and the rental vacancy rate was 7.2%.

Racial composition as of the 2020 census
Race	Number	Percent
White	1,454	93.4%
Black or African American	12	0.8%
American Indian and Alaska Native	3	0.2%
Asian	11	0.7%
Native Hawaiian and Other Pacific Islander	3	0.2%
Some other race	4	0.3%
Two or more races	70	4.5%
Hispanic or Latino (of any race)	11	0.7%

=== 2010 census ===
As of the census of 2010, there were 1,545 people, 694 households, and 407 families living in the town. The population density was 565.9 inhabitants per square mile (218.5/km^{2}). There were 821 housing units at an average density of 300.7 per square mile (116.1/km^{2}). The racial makeup of the town was 97.7% White, 0.4% African American, 0.5% Native American, 0.4% Asian, and 1.0% from two or more races. Hispanic or Latino of any race were 0.5% of the population.

There were 694 households, of which 28.5% had children under the age of 18 living with them, 37.6% were married couples living together, 15.1% had a female householder with no husband present, 5.9% had a male householder with no wife present, and 41.4% were non-families. 36.7% of all households were made up of individuals, and 14.3% had someone living alone who was 65 years of age or older. The average household size was 2.23 and the average family size was 2.86.

The median age in the town was 40.7 years. 22.4% of residents were under the age of 18; 8.8% were between the ages of 18 and 24; 23.5% were from 25 to 44; 27.6% were from 45 to 64; and 17.9% were 65 years of age or older. The gender makeup of the town was 47.7% male and 52.3% female.

=== 2000 census ===
As of the census of 2000, there were 1,725 people, 735 households, and 462 families living in the town. The population density was 637.8 inhabitants per square mile (246.3/km^{2}). There were 803 housing units at an average density of 296.9 per square mile (114.6/km^{2}). The racial makeup of the town was 98.26% White, 0.35% African American, 0.35% Native American, 0.06% Asian, 0.12% Pacific Islander, 0.12% from other races, and 0.75% from two or more races. Hispanic or Latino of any race were 0.46% of the population.

There were 735 households, out of which 27.6% had children under the age of 18 living with them, 41.8% were married couples living together, 16.3% had a female householder with no husband present, and 37.1% were non-families. 31.2% of all households were made up of individuals, and 15.8% had someone living alone who was 65 years of age or older. The average household size was 2.30 and the average family size was 2.86.

In the town, the population was spread out, with 24.5% under the age of 18, 9.5% from 18 to 24, 28.2% from 25 to 44, 21.9% from 45 to 64, and 15.8% who were 65 years of age or older. The median age was 36 years. For every 100 females, there were 88.3 males. For every 100 females age 18 and over, there were 80.8 males.

The median income for a household in the town was $28,750, and the median income for a family was $32,538. Males had a median income of $25,353 versus $20,304 for females. The per capita income for the town was $13,758. About 11.6% of families and 16.8% of the population were below the poverty line, including 19.7% of those under age 18 and 13.7% of those age 65 or over.

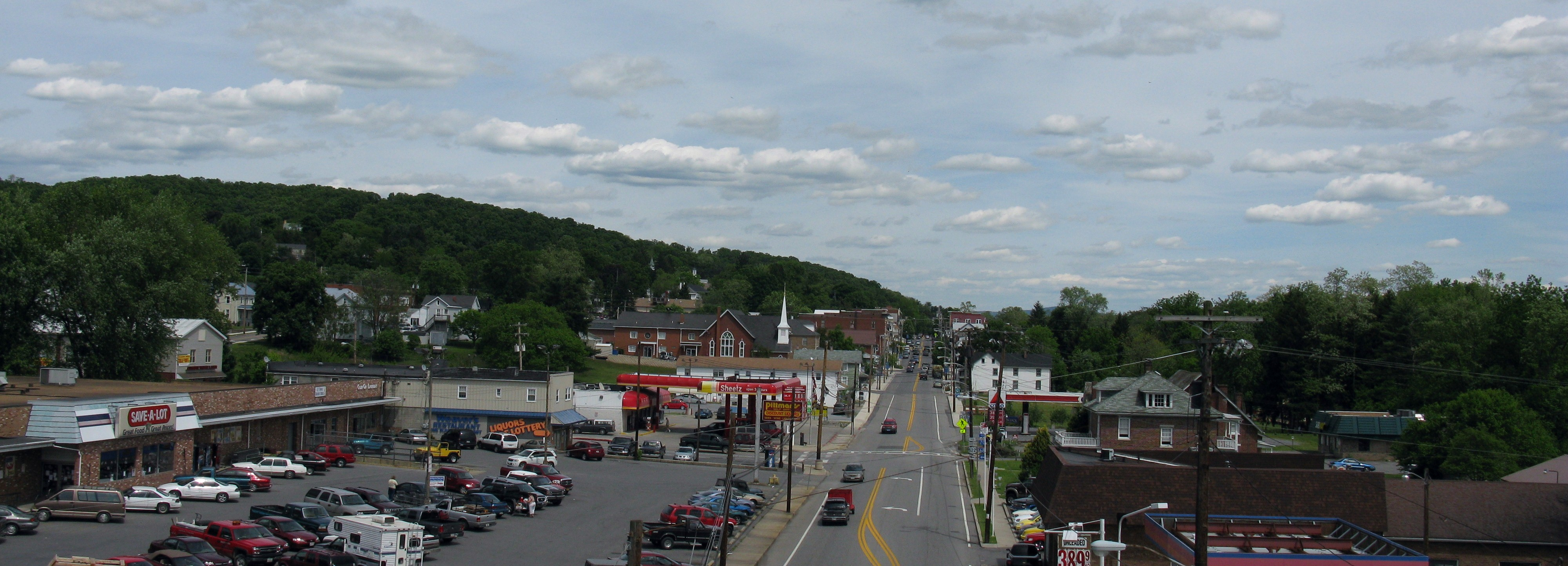
Central Hancock and Maryland Route 144 (Main Street) as seen from the U.S. Route 522 bridge.

== Government ==
The town government consists of five elected officials: a Mayor and four members of the Town Council. Council members are elected to four-year terms, while the Mayor is elected to a two-year term. Hancock is one of the smallest municipalities in the state of Maryland. As of May 2025, the current mayor is Roland E. Lanehart, Jr.

== Notable people ==
- Robert W. Brady – a Jesuit educator and president of the College of the Holy Cross and Boston College
- Ike Powers – a professional baseball player who played two seasons for the Philadelphia Athletics
- Charles H. Rowland – a Republican member of the U.S. House of Representatives from Pennsylvania
- Richard K. Sutherland – U.S. Army Lieutenant general, who served as General Douglas MacArthur's Chief of Staff during World War II
- William Dorsey Swann – first U.S. drag artist and the first American on record who pursued legal and political action to defend the LGBTQ community's right to assemble
- Ian Carey – a house music D.J. and record producer who released a string of popular songs in Europe in the 2000s

== See also ==
- Sideling Hill
