= Green Ridge State Forest =

Protected area in Maryland, United States

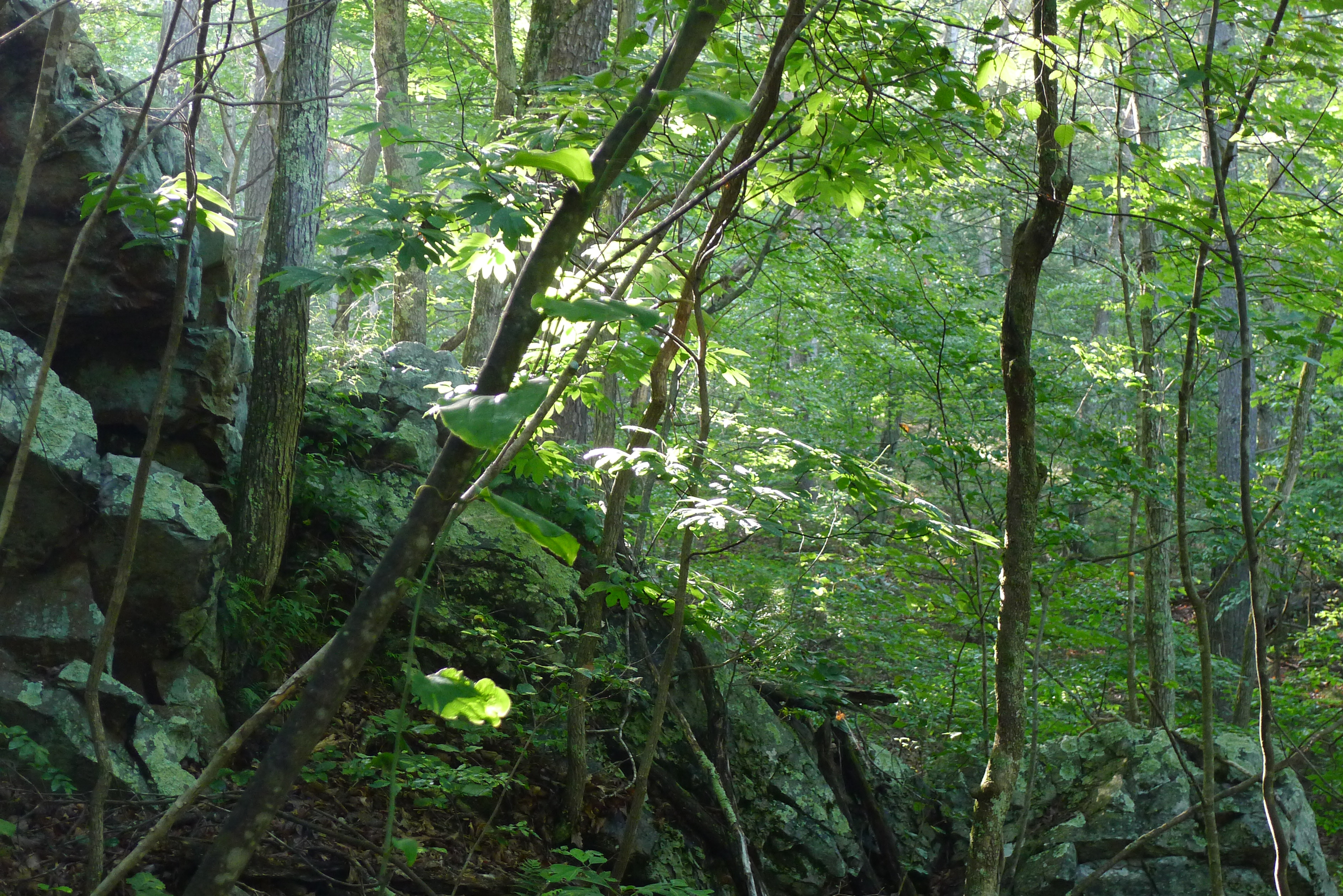

- Location within Maryland
- Location: Allegany, Maryland, United States
- Coordinates: 39°39′55″N 78°26′35″W
- Area: 46,000 acres (190 km^{2})
- Elevation: 926 ft (282 m)
- Established: 1931

Green Ridge State Forest is a state forest in Western Maryland. Approximately 46,000 acres (186 km^{2}) in size, it is situated along Green Ridge and Town Hill in eastern Allegany County.

Camping, hiking, biking, fishing, and boating are all permitted in Green Ridge State Forest. Hunting is also permitted in the forest, and is the most common use.

There are many scenic overlooks, and relaxing spots along the Potomac River. The right of way of the abandoned Western Maryland Railway weaves in and out of the Green Ridge with numerous tunnels (Stickpile and Kesslers) and several massive bridges crossing the Potomac. The Green Ridge was the site of the former Mertens Apple Orchards, which were the largest orchards in the world in 1900. Nearby Hancock, Maryland is still the largest apple-producing area of Maryland. The Chesapeake and Ohio Canal parallels the Potomac River on the southern boundary of the Green Ridge Forest while Interstate 68 is considered for all practical purposes to be the northern boundary of the forest.

== See also ==
- List of Maryland state forests
