= Sideling Hill Creek (Potomac River tributary) =

Stream in the U.S. states of Pennsylvania and Maryland

Coordinates: 39°41′0.5″N 78°19′23″W

Sideling Hill Creek is a 25.2-mile-long (40.6 km) tributary stream of the Potomac River in the U.S. states of Maryland and Pennsylvania. Sideling Hill Creek flows southward along the western flanks of Sideling Hill, from which the stream takes its name. It forms the boundary between Allegany and Washington counties in Maryland.

Sideling Hill Creek is not navigable by boat.

== See also ==
- List of Maryland rivers
- List of rivers of Pennsylvania
