= Hurricane Opal =

Category 4 Atlantic hurricane in 1995

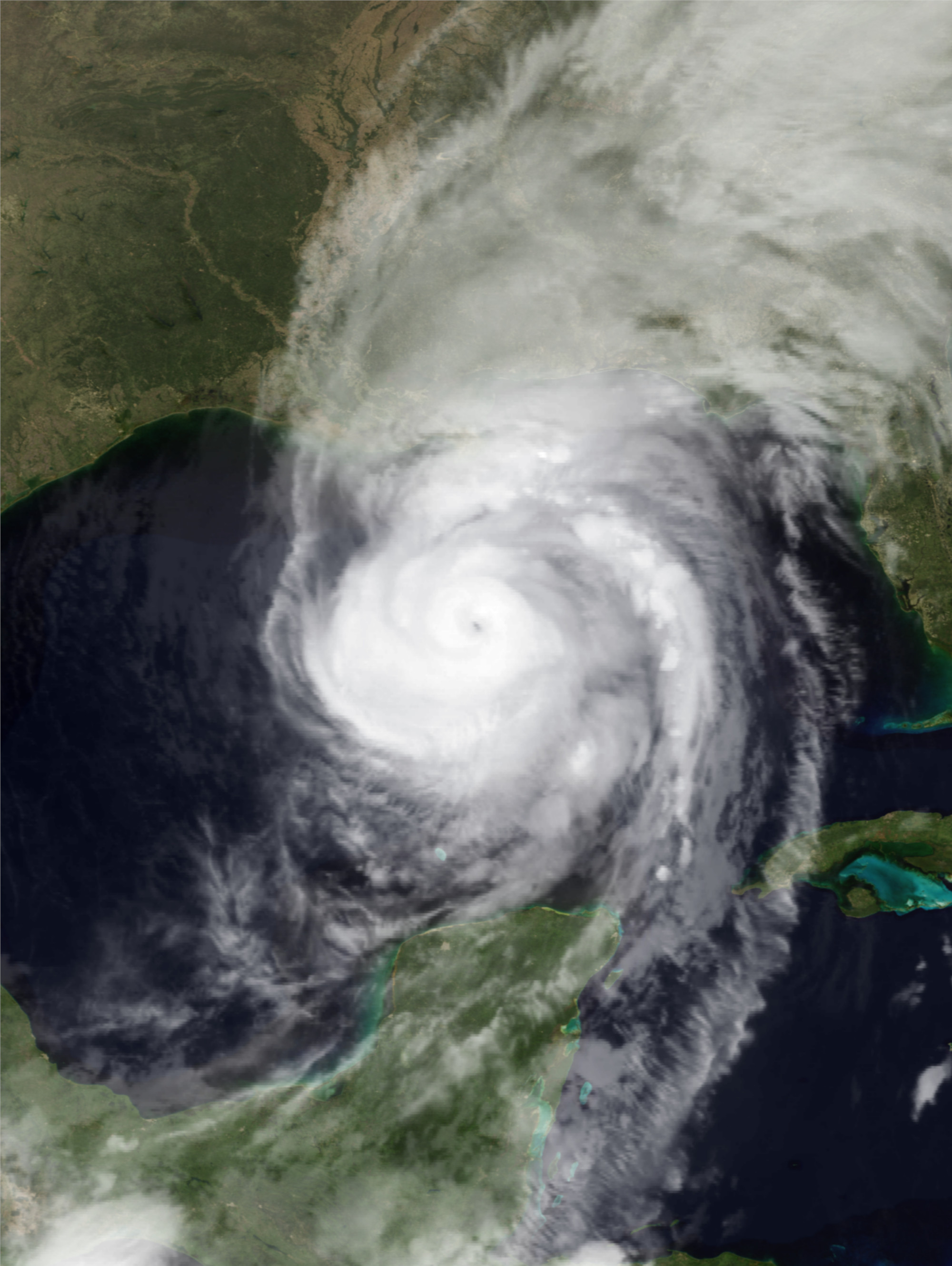
- Opal shortly before peak intensity south of Louisiana early on October 4

Meteorological history
- Formed: September 27, 1995
- Extratropical: October 5, 1995
- Dissipated: October 6, 1995

Category 4 major hurricane
- 1-minute sustained (SSHWS/NWS)
- Highest winds: 150 mph (240 km/h)
- Lowest pressure: 916 mbar (hPa); 27.05 inHg

Overall effects
- Fatalities: 63 total
- Damage: $4.7 billion (1995 USD)
- Areas affected: Guatemala; Yucatán Peninsula; U.S. Gulf Coast (particularly the Florida Panhandle); Ohio River Valley; Ontario
- IBTrACS
- Part of the 1995 Atlantic hurricane season

Hurricane Opal was a large and powerful tropical cyclone that caused severe and extensive damage along the northern Gulf Coast of the United States in October 1995. The fifteenth named storm, ninth hurricane and strongest tropical cyclone of the unusually active 1995 Atlantic hurricane season, Opal developed from the interaction of a tropical wave and a low-pressure area near the Yucatán Peninsula on September 27 as Tropical Depression Seventeen. The depression crossed the Yucatán Peninsula and intensified into a tropical storm on September 30. Opal intensified into a hurricane on October 2 after entering the Gulf of Mexico. The cyclone turned northeastward and strengthened significantly. By October 4, Opal was an intense 150 mph (240 km/h), Category 4 hurricane. With a minimum pressure of 916 millibars (916 hPa; 27.0 inHg), Hurricane Opal was the most intense Category 4 Atlantic hurricane on record. However, the cyclone abruptly weakened to a low-end Category 3 hurricane prior to making landfall on the Florida Panhandle near Pensacola later that day. The storm quickly unraveled as it moved inland and became extratropical on October 5. The remnants of Opal moved northward and dissipated over Ontario the following day.

The precursor and initial stages of Opal brought heavy rainfall and flooding to Guatemala and Mexico. In the former, flooding and landslides left about 34,000 people homeless and damage to infrastructure and agriculture. A total of 31 deaths occurred in Guatemala. In Mexico, a number of rivers overflowed in the states of Campeche and Tabasco, forcing more than 42,000 people to evacuate. The storm left hundreds of millions of dollars in damage to agriculture in Campeche alone. Nineteen people were killed in the country. In Florida, high winds and storm surge left extensive damage in the panhandle. The majority of structures were swept away or experienced some degree of damage, particularly from Wakulla County westward. In Escambia, Okaloosa, Santa Rosa and Bay counties, nearly 300 homes were destroyed and 1,000 others suffered major damage. The storm left at least $2.1 billion in damage in Florida alone. Several other states were impacted by the storm, especially Alabama, where the storm spawned many tornadoes and strong winds downed numerous trees and left about 2.6 million people without electricity. A total of 13 deaths were attributed to Opal in the United States. The hurricane overall left about $4.7 billion in damage, much of which took place in the US. Due to its destructive effects, the name Opal was retired in the spring of 1996 and replaced with Olga for the 2001 season.

== Meteorological history ==
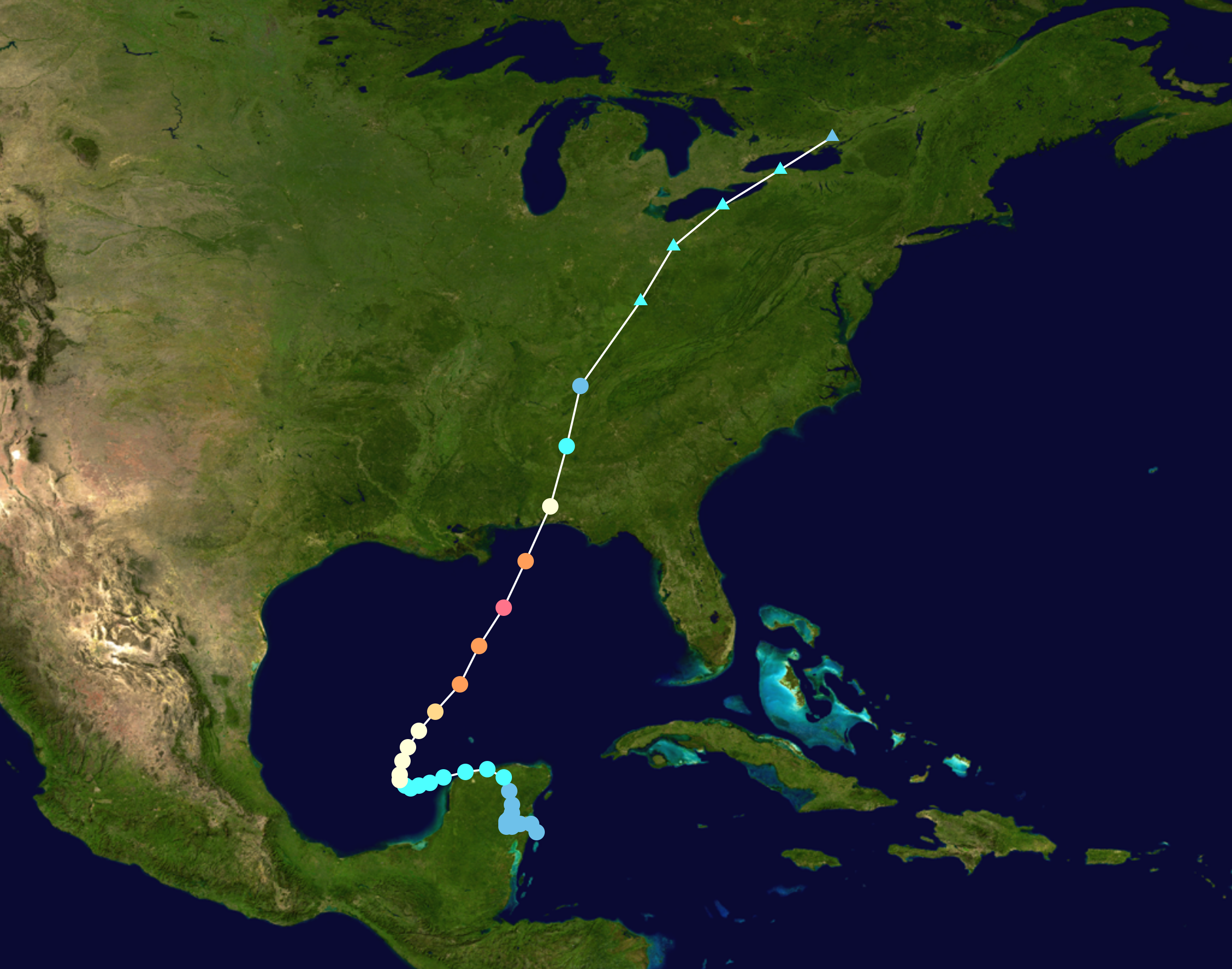
Map plotting the storm's track and intensity, according to the Saffir–Simpson scale Map key Saffir–Simpson scale Tropical depression (≤38 mph, ≤62 km/h) Tropical storm (39–73 mph, 63–118 km/h) Category 1 (74–95 mph, 119–153 km/h) Category 2 (96–110 mph, 154–177 km/h) Category 3 (111–129 mph, 178–208 km/h) Category 4 (130–156 mph, 209–251 km/h) Category 5 (≥157 mph, ≥252 km/h) Unknown Storm type Tropical cyclone Subtropical cyclone Extratropical cyclone, remnant low, tropical disturbance, or monsoon depression

The origins of Hurricane Opal were linked using satellite imagery and synoptic analyses to a tropical wave that left the western coast of Africa on September 11. Ten days later, the disturbance reached the Lesser Antilles after crossing the tropical Atlantic. Continuing westward, the disturbance showed little signs of organization before entering the western Caribbean Sea on September 23. There, the wave became entangled with a broad area of low-pressure east of Nicaragua, and the combined system drifted west-northwestward toward the Yucatán Peninsula; but even then, the disturbance lacked significant development. However, a burst of thunderstorm activity occurred near the storm's center on September 27, prompting the National Hurricane Center (NHC) to declare the system a tropical depression at 18:00 UTC that day. At the time, the depression was centered 80 mi (130 km) south-southeast of Cozumel, Mexico.

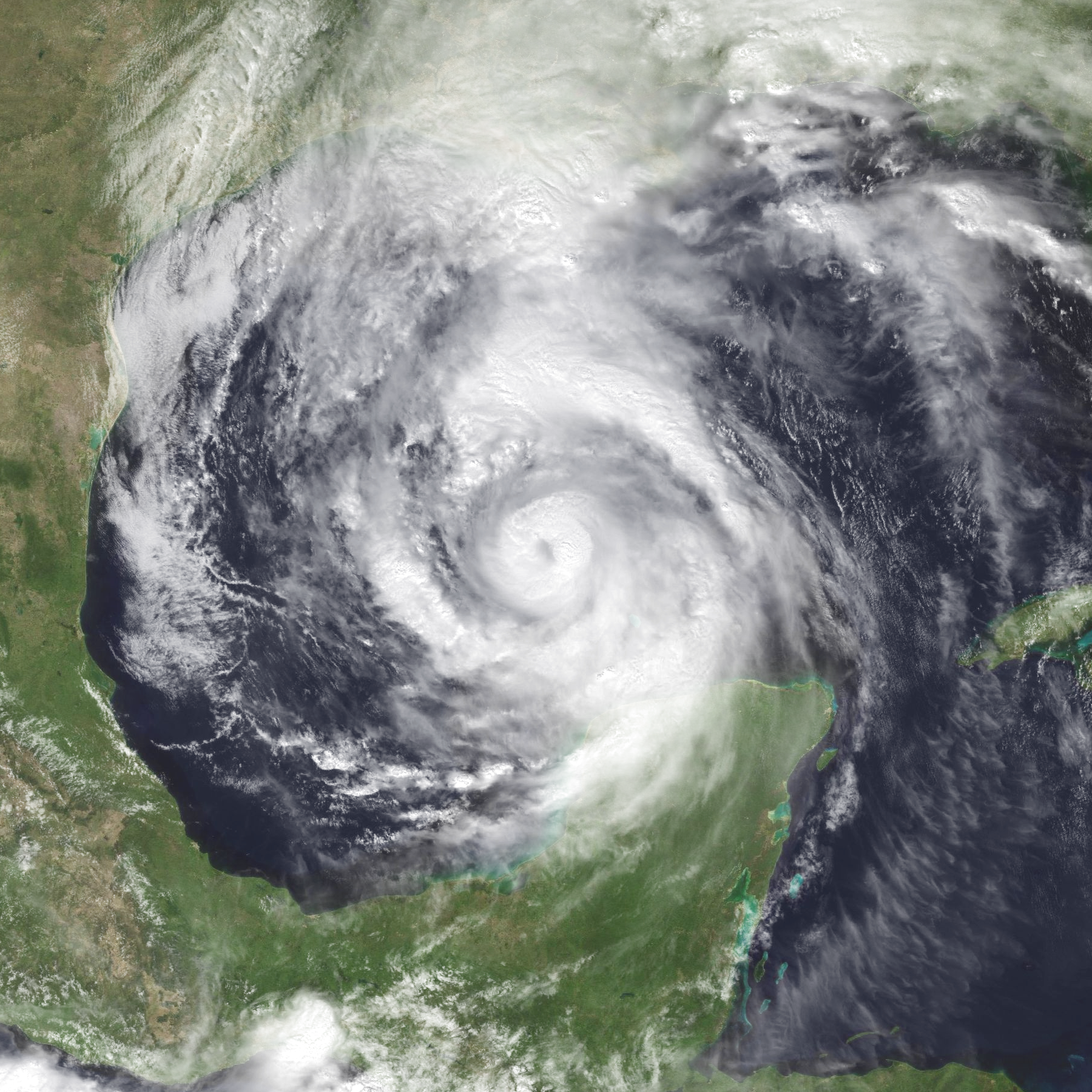
Hurricane Opal rapidly intensifying in the Gulf of Mexico on October 3

The primordial depression meandered across the Yucatán Peninsula during the three days following tropical cyclogenesis due to the lack of dominant steering currents. Despite remaining over land for an extended period, the depression developed organized rainbands, and ships in the region reported weather conditions that were suggestive of a stronger system. As a result, the NHC upgraded the disturbance to tropical storm intensity at 12:00 UTC on September 30 while the storm was over the north-central coast of Yucatán; this classification resulted in the tropical cyclone being named Opal, which also made it the first Atlantic storm to be given a name starting with the letter O. Over the next two days, Opal entered the Gulf of Mexico before tracking slowly west-southwestward into the Bay of Campeche. There, the storm strengthened into a hurricane at 12:00 UTC on October 2. Shortly afterward, a primitive eye began to form. At the same time, a strong trough tracking across the United States caused Opal to slowly turn northeastward.

After clearing the Bay of Campeche, Opal accelerated towards the United States Gulf Coast. The combination of warm sea surface temperatures associated with an unusually warm pocket of ocean waters and an upper-level high pressure area over the Gulf of Mexico resulted in a highly conducive environment for intensification. After a significant reorganization in Opal's internal structure, the hurricane was able to rapidly intensify in these favorable conditions. At 12:00 UTC on October 4, Opal reached peak intensity with maximum sustained winds of 150 mph (240 km/h), making it a Category 4 hurricane on the Saffir–Simpson hurricane wind scale, and a minimum barometric pressure of 916 hPa (27.05 inHg), a pressure typical for a Category 5 hurricane. The tropical cyclone's eye measured 12 mi (19 km) at peak intensity as the storm was beginning an eyewall replacement cycle. The progression of this cycle resulted in Opal's gradual weakening thereafter. At 22:00 UTC that day, Opal made landfall between Pensacola Beach, Florida and Navarre Beach, Florida, on a stretch of beach now known as "Opal Beach", as a weakened Category 3 hurricane with winds of 115 mph (185 km/h). Weakening quickened as Opal moved further inland, degenerating into a tropical depression over Tennessee less than a day after landfall. The diffusing cyclone transitioned into an extratropical cyclone shortly afterwards; these extratropical remnants tracked towards the northeast before they were last noted along the northern shore of Lake Ontario in Eastern Ontario.

== Preparations ==
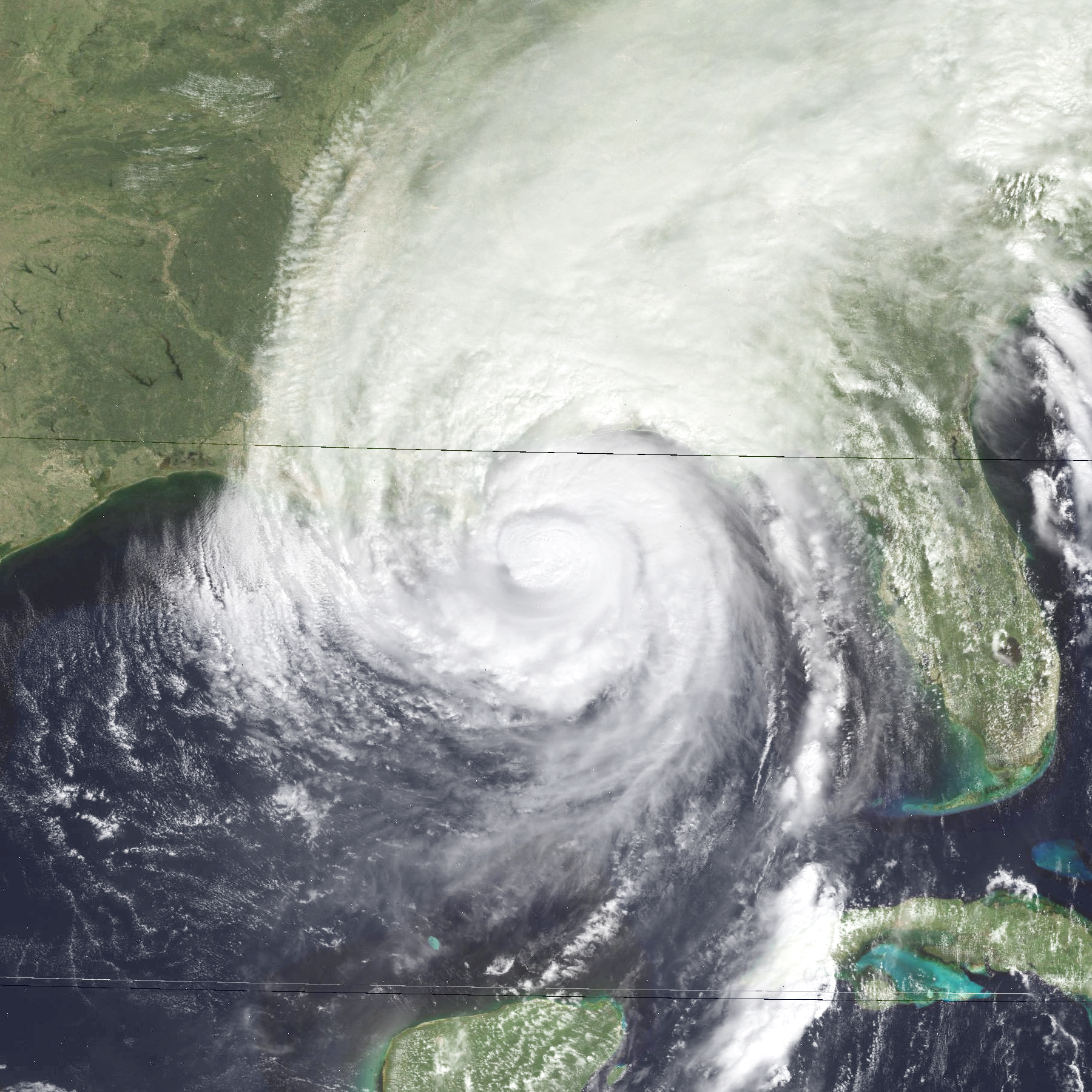
Hurricane Opal near landfall in Pensacola, Florida as a Category 3 hurricane

Although Opal was a weak system located over the Yucatán Peninsula at the time, 350 people evacuated from Grand Isle, Louisiana on September 28 after rough surf associated with the distant cyclone began to threaten Louisiana Highway 1—the only thoroughfare connecting Grand Isle with the Louisianan mainland. The following day, oil companies operating offshore oil drilling platforms in the Gulf of Mexico began evacuating workers from the rigs to land. On October 1, a coastal flood watch was issued for portions of the United States Coast due to the risk of storm surge from Opal. The United States Coast Guard issued an advisory for boaters in the Gulf of Mexico to use caution or remain in port where possible. The next day, the Galveston, Texas, emergency operations center opened to monitor the tropical cyclone and deliberate upon potential preparations for the city. Meanwhile, the launch Space Shuttle Columbia's STS-73 mission set for October 5 was postponed due to Opal's anticipated effects.

On October 3, a voluntary evacuation order was placed on Plaquemines Parish, Louisiana, due to the risks of potential storm surge. Schools were also closed by noon that day across the parish. Voluntary evacuation orders for the Florida panhandle, which would ultimately be the most heavily affected area, also began the same day with several counties giving evacuation orders. Farther west, a mandatory evacuation order was placed on Mobile County, Alabama, by then-Governor Fob James. Just before noon on October 4, with the hurricane near landfall, Escambia, Okaloosa and Santa Rosa counties halted evacuations, instead ordering those still within vulnerable areas to seek shelter instead. However, the large number of evacuees led to severe traffic congestion; Escambia County officials estimated that "tens of thousands" were still on evacuation routes within the county only a few hours before Opal made landfall. Mass evacuations in some other counties concluded during the afternoon of October 4, though many evacuees in other locations were unable to reach safe areas prior to the onset of gale-force winds.

An estimated 100,000 people evacuated from the United States Gulf Coast ahead of Opal, with 5 percent of evacuees seeking public shelters and over half of evacuees seeking shelter out of their home counties; in their post-storm assessment the Federal Emergency Management Agency (FEMA) noted that the landfalls of Hurricane Allison and Hurricane Erin on the Florida panhandle earlier in the year produced a dichotomous mood toward preparations for Hurricane Opal—some people may have taken a "wait and see" approach that resulted in complacency, while others affected by the widespread power outages caused by Erin may have acquired a greater sense of readiness toward the approaching hurricane. Regardless, the overall evacuation process was described as chaotic, and the failure to clear hurricane evacuation routes of casual or communal traffic was blamed for the relative unease during evacuations for Opal. Traffic congestion on these routes caused some evacuees to return to vulnerable areas along the coast while raising fears that stranded evacuees on highways could be subjected to potentially fatal hurricane-force winds.

The post-landfall watches and warnings released in accordance with Opal were a flash flood warning released on October 5 for portions of Alabama, northern Georgia, and the western parts of North Carolina and South Carolina. The warning also included eastern Tennessee. A flash flood watch was also in effect for portions of the Upper Ohio Valley, the Mid-Atlantic region, the central Appalachians, and the lower Great Lakes. Wind warnings were in effect for northwestern South Carolina all the way to western New York. A gale watch was also in effect for Lake Erie, Lake Ontario, and the southern sections of the St. Lawrence Seaway.

Six hours later, the gale warnings over Lake Erie, Lake Ontario, and the southern sections of the St. Lawrence Seaway were upgraded into a storm warning for Erie alone. The gale warning for the other two sections remained. The shoreline of Lake Erie was under a beach erosion warning from Buffalo, New York to Ripley, New York. The Storm Prediction Center released a tornado watch for northern and central New Jersey and portions of New York and Connecticut on October 6.

Significant non-surge areas of Escambia County, Florida, south of US 98 were included in evacuation areas because of the potential for isolation by flooding.

== Impact ==
Storm deaths by region
Area	Deaths
Alabama	2
Florida	1
Georgia	8
Guatemala	31
Mexico	19
North Carolina	2
Total	63

=== Mexico and Central America ===
As a tropical storm, Opal's slow movement led to prolonged, flooding rains over the Yucatán, killed 19 people in Mexico and another 31 in Guatemala. Tabasco received about 20% of its annual rainfall in four days. Across Campeche and Tabasco, more than 42,000 people were forced to evacuate as rivers overflowed their banks. According to Notimex, approximately 100,000 people evacuated due to the storm. By October 1, an estimated 500,000 acres of crops had been destroyed by the floods. In San Francisco de Campeche, flood waters reached a depth of 6 ft (1.8 m). Governor Jorge Salomon ordered the closure of all government offices, businesses, and schools by October 2 in light of the extensive flooding. At least 60 towns across the state were isolated by the extreme rainfall. By October 3, agricultural losses in Campeche alone were estimated in the billions of pesos (hundreds of millions of USD).

=== United States ===
Throughout the United States, Opal killed 13 people. Monetary damage totaled about US$4.7 billion (1995 dollars) in damage. This made Opal the country's third-costliest Atlantic hurricane at the time. Opal also produced an outbreak of 22 tornadoes across the southeastern United States.

==== Florida ====
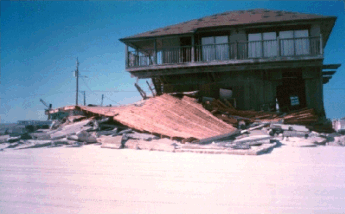
Damage from Hurricane Opal

Opal's storm surge affected the Florida panhandle coastline, estimated between 8 to 15 ft (2.4 to 4.6 m). The Panama City Beach pier recorded the highest observed surge, which was 8.3 ft (2.5 m) above sea level. High tides occurred as far east as Sarasota, which observed a 2 to 4 ft (0.61 to 1.22 m) storm surge. Rainfall in the state peaked at 15.52 in (394 mm) in Milton. The highest wind gust was 144 mph (231 km/h), recorded at Hurlburt Field, and the same station recorded sustained winds of 84 mph (135 km/h).

Most of the structural damage occurred near the coastline on the Florida Panhandle, due to intense surge. Nearly a mile of U.S. Highway 98 near Eglin Air Force Base was completely destroyed. The pavement was nearly replaced by mounds of sand left behind after storm surge. Opal also spawned an F2 tornado that killed a young woman in Florida. None died as a direct result of storm surge. This was quite unusual, considering the strength and landfall location of Opal. Okaloosa Island, Fort Walton Beach, was overwhelmed by storm surge. Numerous homes were under 3 to 10 feet (0.91 to 3.05 m) of water. Residents were not allowed to return to the island until the homes could be secured. A Humvee tour was arranged by the National Guard so home owners could 'see' the damage, but the homeowners were not allowed off the bus. Sand dunes along the stretch of US 98, normally 25 feet (7.6 m) high, were removed by wind and surge. Where once the ocean was obscured from view by the dunes for miles, a flat open space opened up along U.S. Highway 98.

==== Southeastern United States ====
Hurricane Opal was one of the largest-diameter US Gulf Coast hurricanes. Though large size does not imply strength—which is based on sustained wind measurements—it can mean that more people are exposed to its hazards.

The peak rainfall from Opal in Alabama was 19.42 inches (493 mm) 3 miles (4.8 km) east-northeast of Brewton, Alabama. Lesser amounts include 7.48 inches (190 mm) in Mobile and 6.1 inches (150 mm) in Anniston. The highest gust reported was a 95 mph (153 km/h) gust in Fort Rucker and a secondary one at Maxwell Air Force Base with a gust of 90 mph (140 km/h). The highest sustained winds reported from Opal was 75 mph (121 km/h) at Fort Rucker, 55 mph (89 km/h) in downtown Mobile and 47 mph (76 km/h) at Maxwell Air Force Base and Montgomery. Numerous downed trees across much of the southeastern United States left over 2 million people without power. Alabama reported that 476,000 residents were without power, which was a record at the time; however, this number was surpassed by Hurricane Ivan in 2004. Damage was heavy far inland, all the way to Montgomery, where sustained winds reached 90 mph (140 km/h).

Highest rainfalls in Mississippi were 5 inches (130 mm) throughout the eastern side of the state with lower amounts going westward. Tropical-storm-force winds were reported along the Gulf Coast during the afternoon and early evening of October 4. Wind damage was mainly limited to downed tree limbs, power lines, and signs. One minor injury was reported in Harrison County due to flying debris. Damage in Mississippi totaled up to $75 thousand.

In Louisiana, the only significant wind damage occurred in extreme south Plaquemines Parish where winds were estimated around 60 miles per hour (97 km/h) with gusts to hurricane force, with wind damage reported to some mobile homes and roofs of a few other structures. Tropical storm force winds were reported in extreme south Lafourche Parish and Jefferson Parish, as well as extreme east St. Bernard Parish. Property damage cost estimated. Tides were generally 2 feet (0.61 m) above normal in Lake Pontchartrain, and three to five feet above normal along the southeast Louisiana coast from Grand Isle eastward. Some low-lying coastal roads were flooded. Approximately 10,000 people evacuated from the southern, or lower, portions of Plaquemines, St. Bernard, Lafourche, and Jefferson Parishes. The only significant gathering of persons in public shelters occurred in Plaquemines Parish, where 1,600 people were placed in public shelters. In Jefferson Parish, an employee was tossed and severely injured while lowering a large flag. Total damage in Louisiana totaled out to US$200,000 (1995 dollars).

Breaking swells from Opal in Texas caused water to spill across at the usual wash-over points which damaged several vehicles.

The peak rainfall in Georgia was 18.08 inches (459 mm) in Peachtree City. The peak wind gust in Georgia was a 79 mph (127 km/h) gust in Marietta. Wind gusts reached56 mph (90 km/h) gust in the Atlanta-Hartsfield area. High winds in Rabun County caused $5 million (1995 USD) from the approach of Opal on October 5. The damage was worst in Rabun County where numerous trees were blown down. The wind damage was described as being worse than the March Superstorm of 1993. Power was out for some people for at least a week. More than 4000 trees were knocked down within the city of Atlanta alone. These trees fell across roads, and on power lines, homes, mobile homes, and automobiles. More than a half a dozen people were injured from falling trees in the early morning hours of October 5. There were more than 1200 telephone poles knocked down and almost 5,000 power lines snapped. Power crews from surrounding states helped to restore power to many, however, thousands of residences remained without power through the weekend.

An 80-foot (24 m) gash was torn out of Interstate 285 between Roswell Road and the Glenridge Connector in Atlanta. Schools were closed on October 5 and 6 throughout the cities of Atlanta, Marietta, and in Fulton, Coweta, Carroll and Douglas counties. A total of 47 of 101 schools were closed in Dekalb County alone. Four state parks were closed after Opal: Moccasin Creek Park, Black Rock Mountain, Vogel State Park, and Fort Mountain State Park. 273 stations reported many falling traffic lights. Agricultural experts estimated that damage to the pecan crop was about $50 million. Several rivers and creeks overflowed their banks.

Beginning the evening of October 4, numerous power outages were reported in metro Atlanta, where sustained tropical storm conditions overnight (including gusts to nearly 70 mph (110 km/h)) felled thousands of trees. Oaks were particularly susceptible, as their root systems were loose.

Around 7 inches (180 mm) of rainfall was recorded in extreme northwestern South Carolina and came in reducing amounts around the rest of the state. Heavy rainfalls closed roads and bridges, causing $24 million in crop and property damage. A tornado in Chesterfield, South Carolina caused many trees to be blown down in the Carolina Sandhills National Wildlife Refuge. Trees were blown down in Orangeburg, one of those trees fell onto a car and totaled it. An F0 tornado spawned by one of Opal's bands downed a number of trees and power lines. Campers, vehicles, structures and boats were damaged in Greenville.

In North Carolina, over 17 inches (430 mm) of rain fell. The rainfall included 9.89 inches (251 mm) in Robinson Creek and 8.95 inches (227 mm) in Highlands. The Robinson Creek rains spawned flash flooding. Officials in the state had the citizens boil their water before drinking it because of a possibility that floodwater may have entered purification plants. A landslide triggered by Opal and damaged the Blue Ridge Parkway. Opal triggered a debris flow in the Poplar Cove area of Macon County. A flash flood from rainfall amounts typically ranged from four to six inches (100 to 150 mm) and closed roads and bridges were the result. The most serious flooding apparently occurred in Avery County where evacuations were required and tanks of propane were found floating in the Banner Elk River.

Three deaths also occurred in the state. A man in Candler was killed when a falling tree destroyed his mobile home. Another man was killed near Marshall when a tree was blown onto him while he was helping cut other trees out of the roadway. 10 people were also injured by wind blown debris and from falling trees. Damage from high winds totaled up to $15 million.

==== Elsewhere in the United States ====
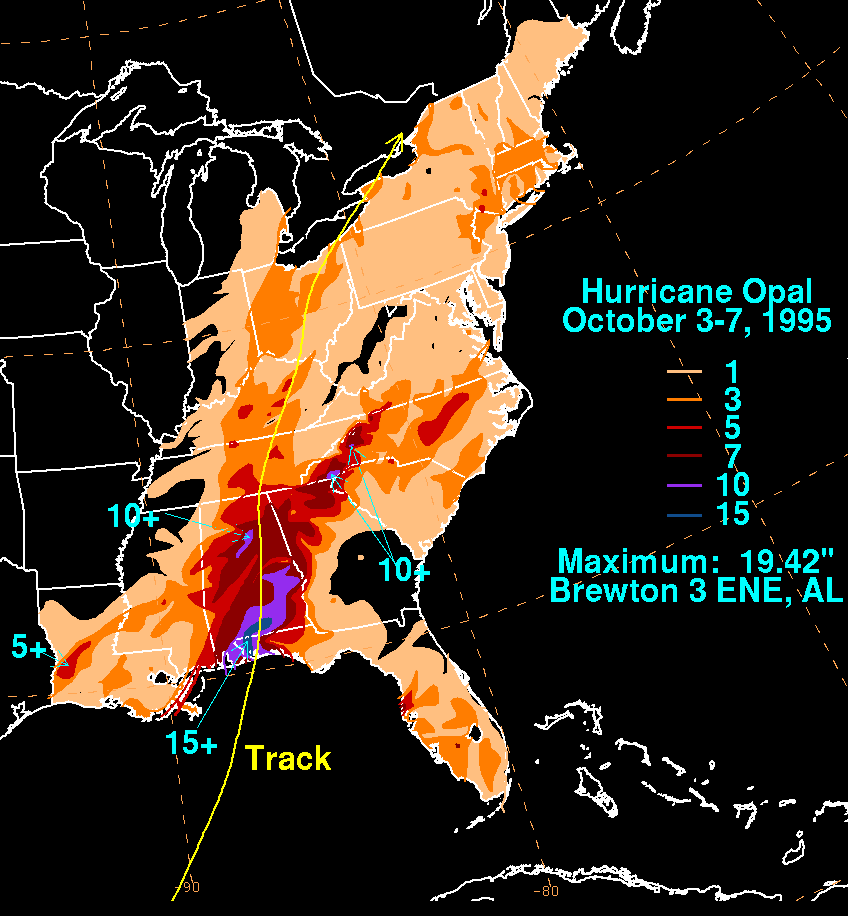
Rainfall Totals

In Virginia, trees in the Shenandoah Valley and along the Allegheny Plateau were blown down by 40 mph (64 km/h) winds at higher elevations. Over 7000 people were without power and damage in Virginia totaled to $5000. The National Park Service reported dozens of trees blown down along Skyline Drive in two counties.

In the Great Smoky Mountains, power and phone service were out in many areas of the park. Newfound Gap road closed for several days due to trees and a rockslide that were lying across it. Campers were asked to leave Elkmont Campground near Gatlinburg because of high water. Many sections of the Blue Ridge Parkway were closed because of trees that fell across the road. Flooding occurred in the northern portion of the parkway. Linville Falls was evacuated; the Asheville and Gillespie Gap Districts were closed. Rockslides and mudslides had also been reported due to Opal.

In West Virginia, 0.5–1.5 inches (13–38 mm) of rain were reported causing some schools to let out early. High winds associated with the remnants of Opal moved through southeast West Virginia on the 5th. High winds ranged between 35 and 45 mph (72 km/h) with some gusts to near 55 mph (89 km/h). Numerous trees, large branches, power lines and shingles off the roofs of homes were ripped off in the wind. The vast majority of damage occurred at elevations above two thousand feet. Damage from the wind totaled out to $2000. Large limbs were downed by high wind across from the remnants of Hurricane Opal in Preston County. Damage there totaled out to $1000. Damage in West Virginia totaled out to only $5,000.

In Maryland, a large tree and its limbs along Maryland Route 495 near Bittinger were downed by high winds associated with the remnants of Opal. The damage from the fallen tree and its limbs totaled out to one thousand dollars. Mesocyclones moving around Opal's eastern periphery within Maryland spawned three tornadoes in Charles, Prince George's, and Anne Arundel County. The first tornado tracked along State Route 425 between the towns of Ironside and Grayton. Along the tornado's path, several trees were uprooted or snapped; two sheds were destroyed and two others sustained roof damage. Windows were blown out of a barn and several vehicles. Ten thousand dollars in damage occurred. The second and strongest tornado hit ground in Temple Hills, injuring three people after reaching a peak wind of 150 mph (240 km/h). 100 homes were damaged with 15 being condemned. The Potomac Electric Power reported 9000 people without power. Damage from the second tornado totaled out to $5 million. The third and final tornado touched down in Odenton, became an F1 tornado and doing $250,000 in damage to the area. Eleven houses were damaged and about 10,000 people were without power in the whole district that the Baltimore Gas and Electric serves.

In Tennessee, rainfall peaked at 6.17 in (157 mm) in Tullahoma. Wind speeds at the higher elevations of the Appalachian Mountains were recorded at 70 mph (110 km/h) whereas 40–50 mph (64–80 km/h) gusts were more common at the lower elevations. Trees and power lines were down over much of the region. Over 70 miles (110 km) of the Appalachian Trail were closed due to trees being down. A total of over 20,000 people were without power from Opal. The most damage occurred in Hamilton County, which had damage was estimated over a total of $1 million. Damage in Hamilton County include a circus was left stranded at a campground and needed to be evacuated. A number of residences and businesses were also surrounded by water and occupants were to be evacuated. Total damage in Tennessee totaled out at $2.02 million.

In Kentucky, 1 to 5 inches (25 to 127 mm) of rain was reported throughout the state from Opal. Total rainfall across Jefferson County, where Louisville is located ranged from 2.4 inches (61 mm) at the Louisville International Airport to 3.5 inches (89 mm) at Fern Creek Road south of the Gene Snyder Freeway. Several trees were knocked down and soils were saturated after Opal passed through. A bridge washed out over Sulphur Creek and minor flooding was reported across Kentucky Route 80. Elizabethtown and the Fort Knox area had several roads closed after Opal washed them out.

In Michigan, Opal produced 2 to 3 inches (51 to 76 mm) of rain over the Middle Rouge River Basin from late afternoon through the evening on the 5th. As a result, the Middle Rouge River crested one foot over flood stage, causing the Edward Hines Drive to be closed off to traffic. High winds associated with the remains of Hurricane Opal affected the area during the late afternoon and early evening on the 5th. Strong northeast winds destroyed a new 200-foot (61-m), two-story pole barn on the Marine City Highway in Marine City. The storm also cut power to several areas, resulting in some school closings. The maximum wind gust at Detroit Metro Airport was a 38-mph (61-km/h) gust, which was from the northeast. The damage from this incident totaled out to $15,000.

The remnants of Opal passed across northeast Ohio and caused wind gusts up to 45 mph (72 km/h) and sustained winds of 20 to 30 mph (32 to 48 km/h) all across northern Ohio. Several automobiles were damaged by falling trees or limbs. Crops were damaged from the strong winds. A number of farms reported fields of corn blown over and ripe apples and other fruit being stripped from trees. Rainfall of 3.4 inches (86 mm) in less than 24 hours was measured at Mansfield, and most areas averaged 1.5 to 2.5 inches (38 to 64 mm) during the same period. Flooding was localized and not significant since very dry conditions preceded the storm. Sustained northeast winds ahead of the storm reached 55 mph (89 km/h) all across the lake with gusts to 70 mph (110 km/h) producing waves of 10 to 14 feet (3.0 to 4.3 m). Minor to moderate beach and shore erosion occurred in many areas, especially the western end of the lake. Localized flooding occurred in communities with low-lying areas along the lake. Boats were also grounded. Damage in Ohio totaled out to $205,000.

In New Jersey, thunderstorms with heavy rain, averaging around 3.5 inches (89 mm) countywide, caused flooding of small streams and roadways including United States Route 46. The heavy rain was represented as the first significant dent in the drought that had affected northern New Jersey since September 1994. Storm totals included 6.7 inches (170 mm) in Wawayanda, 5.3 (135 mm) in Hackettstown, 4.5 inches (110 mm) in Oak Ridge, 4.2 inches (110 mm) in Clinton and 4.10 inches (104 mm) in Pequannock.

The remnants of Opal caused severe thunderstorms that uprooted trees near Belvidere. Trees and wires were down in scattered parts of the county including Route 57 near the Tri-county Firehouse. Downed wires caused power outages in Hackettstown and Mansfield Township.

The remnants of Hurricane Opal passed over northwest Pennsylvania on Thursday night (5th/6th) and caused wind gusts up to 50 mph (80 km/h) and sustained winds of 20 to 30 mph (32 to 48 km/h). Heavy rains accompanied the storm and averaged 1.5 to 2.5 inches (38 to 64 mm). Flooding was localized and not significant since drought conditions preceded the storm. The prolonged period of strong winds brought down trees and limbs along with some power lines. At least one automobile was damaged by a downed tree in Erie. Several farms reported fields of corn blown down and apples and other fruit being stripped from trees. The actual crop damage estimate was unknown.

The remnants of Opal passed just to the west of Buffalo, New York on October 5 and 6. Two to 3 inches (38–64 mm) of rain fell over much of the area with isolated amounts of near four inches (100 mm) over parts of the western Southern Tier. Sustained winds were estimated between 35 and 40 mph (56 and 64 km/h), but the easterly winds did down some trees and power lines. In Oneida County, the high winds downed trees and wires in New York Mills, Waterville, Sylvan Beach, North Bay, Lee Center, Rome, McConnellsville and Verona. In Saratoga County a large tree limb was downed in Saratoga Springs which damaged four cars. Total damage in New York totaled to $35,000.

A low pressure area which used to be Opal moved across western and northern New York late and into Vermont on the night of October 5 and the morning October 6. Damaging winds occurred across parts of central and northern Vermont but especially along the western slopes of the Green Mountains. Damaging winds downed trees and power lines across Essex, Orleans, Addison, Caledonia and Rutland counties. In Essex County damage occurred in Canaan and Concord. Damage was also reported in Caledonia County, in Rutland County, in Clarendon and Chittenden and in Orleans County in Derby Center. Total damage in Vermont totaled out to $135,000.

Heavy winds and rain associated with the remnants of Opal brought down trees and knocked out power in southwestern and northern New Hampshire. One person was injured in Marlborough when a large tree blew onto his moving pickup truck.

In Maine, heavy winds and rain associated with the remnants of Opal brought down trees and knocked out power in coastal areas of southern Maine. Some beach erosion occurred in Saco. Strong winds ripped away boats from their moorings in the Midcoast towns of Camden and Rockland.

=== Canada ===
Wind and gale warnings were issued in Southern Ontario and the upper St. Lawrence River in accordance with the remnants of Opal by the Canadian Hurricane Centre on October 5. Accompanying winds reached 83 kilometres per hour (52 mph) in Toronto and up to 102 kilometres per hour (63 mph) in Southern Ontario, feeling trees and power lines. The remnants also spawned a heavy rainfall warning by the Ontario and the Quebec Weather Centers for southern parts of both provinces but anticipated rain amounts would not be of the order of the ones associated with Hurricane Hazel 41 years before. The leftover system of Opal also spawned a gale warning for Nova Scotia.

Rainfalls were from 0.5 inches (13 mm) in Northwestern Ontario to 4 inches (100 mm) in southern parts of Ontario and Quebec, less in New Brunswick. For example, Toronto received 78.6 millimetres (3.09 in), flooding basements and streets. In Quebec, 80 millimetres (3.1 in) were recorded in Montreal, only 2 millimetres (0.079 in) short of the record set by Hurricane Frederic 16 years prior. Rainfall stretched out to the area of Nova Scotia, but only up to 0.5 inches (13 mm) was reported there.

== Response ==
The response to Hurricane Opal was the first major activation of the Emergency Management Assistance Compact (EMAC), an interstate compact providing for mutual aid among the states, with Georgia, Tennessee, and Texas sending personnel to Florida.

== Retirement ==
In the spring of 1996, the World Meteorological Organization retired the name Opal from its rotating name lists due to the deaths and destruction the hurricane caused, and it will never again be used in the Atlantic basin. It was replaced with Olga for the 2001 season.

== See also ==
- List of Category 4 Atlantic hurricanes
- List of Florida hurricanes
- Hurricane Eloise (1975) – Major hurricane that struck the Florida Panhandle in September 1975
- Hurricane Ivan (2004) – Large and intense hurricane that caused widespread and severe damage in Florida and Alabama
- Hurricane Dennis (2005) – Early-forming Category 4 hurricane which affected nearby areas
- Hurricane Michael (2018) – Similarly intense; the strongest tropical cyclone to make landfall on the Florida Panhandle in recorded history
- Hurricane Helene (2024) – Category 4 hurricane that had a similar path and effects in Florida and in the inland eastern U.S.
