= Jennings, Maryland =

Jennings may refer to the following places in the U.S. state of Maryland:

- Jennings, Anne Arundel County, Maryland, an unincorporated community
- Jennings, Garrett County, Maryland, an unincorporated community and census-designated place
