= Maryland Route 135 =

State highway in the U.S. state of Maryland

Maryland Route 135
- Maryland Route 135 highlighted in red

Route information
- Maintained by MDSHA
- Length: 29.00 mi (46.67 km)
- Existed: 1931–present
- Tourist routes: Mountain Maryland Scenic Byway

Major junctions
- West end: US 219 in Oakland
- MD 560 in Loch Lynn Heights; MD 495 in Altamont; MD 38 near Kitzmiller; MD 36 in Westernport
- East end: US 220 in McCoole

Location
- Country: United States
- State: Maryland
- Counties: Garrett, Allegany

Highway system
- Maryland highway system; Interstate; US; State; Scenic Byways
← MD 134	→ MD 136

Maryland Route 135 (MD 135) is a state highway in the U.S. state of Maryland. Known for most of its length as Maryland Highway, the state highway runs 29.00 miles (46.67 km) from U.S. Route 219 (US 219) in Oakland in Garrett County east to US 220 in McCoole in Allegany County. MD 135 is the main link between the towns of Oakland, Mountain Lake Park, Loch Lynn Heights, and Deer Park on the Appalachian Plateau and the communities of Bloomington, Luke, Westernport, and McCoole in the upper valley of the North Branch Potomac River. These groups of towns are separated by Backbone Mountain.

MD 135 was originally built in the early 1930s as a link between McCoole and Westernport. In the late 1930s, the state highway was extended west to Bloomington. In addition, a separate segment of MD 135 was completed around Swanton in the mid-1930s. These separate segments were unified in the early 1950s when the highway over Backbone Mountain was completed. In the late 1950s, MD 135 was extended west over a portion of MD 38 and all of Maryland Route 41 (MD 41) to Oakland, and was mostly rebuilt over its entire length, bypassing Bloomington, Swanton, Deer Park, and Mountain Lake Park. MD 135 remains notorious for the eastbound descent from Backbone Mountain, which has claimed many lives. The Maryland State Highway Administration has instituted many measures to get trucks down the mountain safely and to avoid the downgrade if possible.

== Route description ==
MD 135 begins at an intersection with US 219 on the eastern edge of Oakland. Northbound US 219 (Oak Street) continues straight west into downtown Oakland, southbound US 219 (Garrett Highway) heads south toward Red House, and 9th Street (MD 219) heads north along the alignment of the future Oakland Bypass. MD 135 heads east through Mountain Lake Park as Maryland Highway, a two-lane undivided highway with partial control of access. Oakland Drive, which is unsigned MD 825B, splits to the northeast to serve residential areas on the north side of town. The old alignment rejoins MD 135 at G Street before access controls cease upon crossing the Little Youghiogheny River. The state highway intersects MD 560 (Paull Street), which heads south into Loch Lynn Heights. After crossing the river again, MD 135 leaves Mountain Lake Park. The state highway passes scattered residences, farms, and businesses before entering Deer Park. After passing Deer Park Hotel Road, which passes the Pennington Cottage, MD 135 intersects the old alignment of MD 38, which is Sand Flat Road to the north and Main Street to the south. The state highway passes the historic home Glamorgan and Edgewood Drive, part of the old alignment of MD 38, before leaving Deer Park. Upon reaching the hamlet of Altamont, MD 495 (Swanton Road) continues straight northeast toward Swanton while MD 135 turns to the southeast.

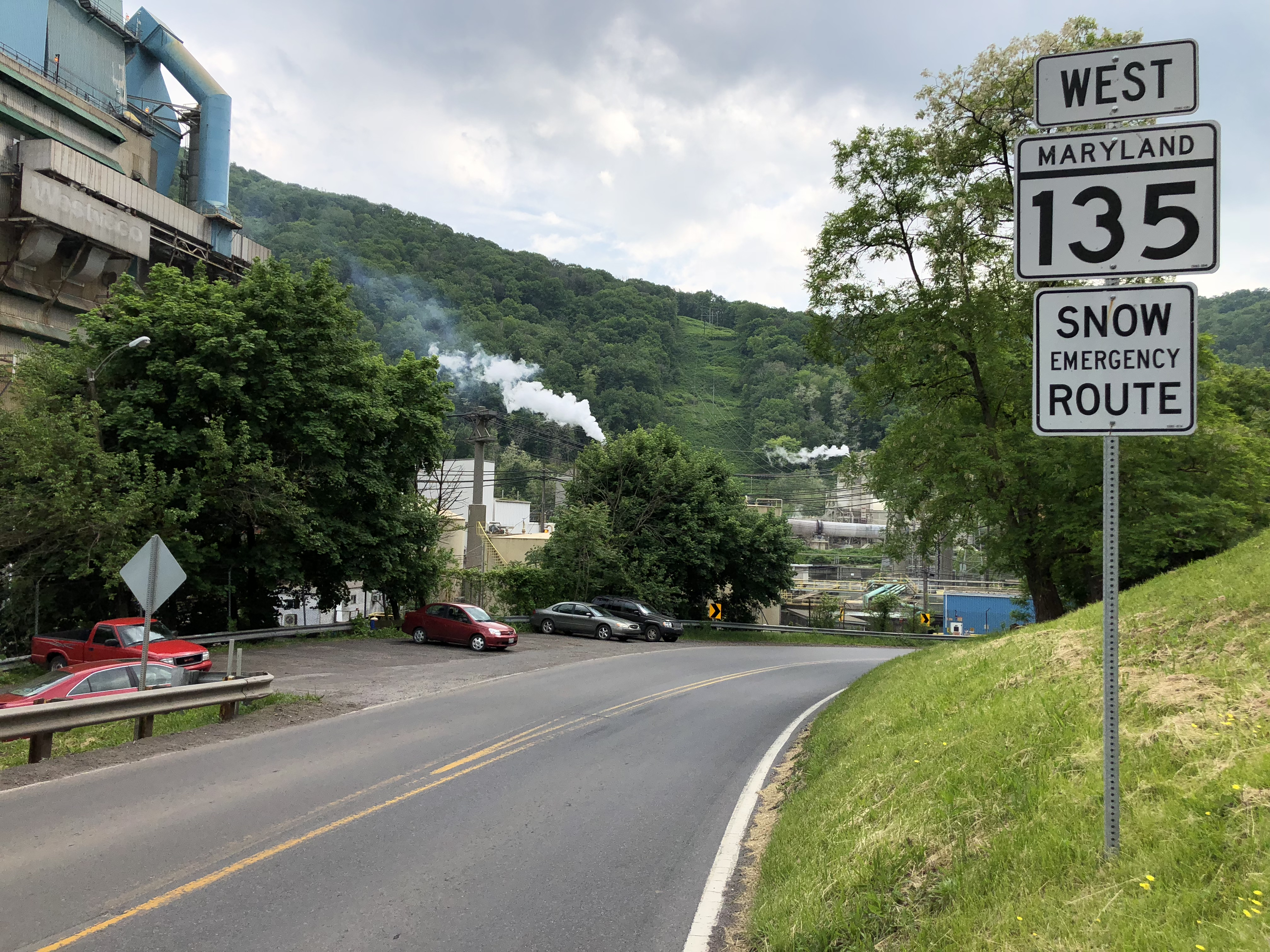
MD 135 westbound in Luke

MD 135 heads straight southeast toward a grade-separated crossing of CSX's Mountain Subdivision railroad line very close to the railroad's crossing of the Eastern Continental Divide. The state highway curves to the northeast and gently ascends Backbone Mountain. A scenic overlook marks the highest point on MD 135 at 2,969 feet (905 m) shortly before the intersection with MD 38 (Kitzmiller Road). The state highway continues northeast along the ridgeline through Potomac-Garrett State Forest and intersects Swanton Road and a few roads on the south side of the highway that access Jennings Randolph Lake. Upon leaving the state forest, MD 135 begins to pass scattered residences ahead of the descent of Backbone Mountain, which has grades as steep as 9%. Trucks are required to stop at three different brake check locations and obey a posted speed limit of 10 mph (16 km/h). After Bloomington Hill Road splits to the north and the state highway passes the third brake check stop, a runaway truck ramp splits to the south. The downhill grade eases as MD 135 enters Bloomington, where the name of the highway changes to Bloomington Road. After passing through residential areas, the state highway crosses the Mountain Subdivision and the Savage River before meeting Savage Hillside Road at a T intersection in front of Franklin Hill.

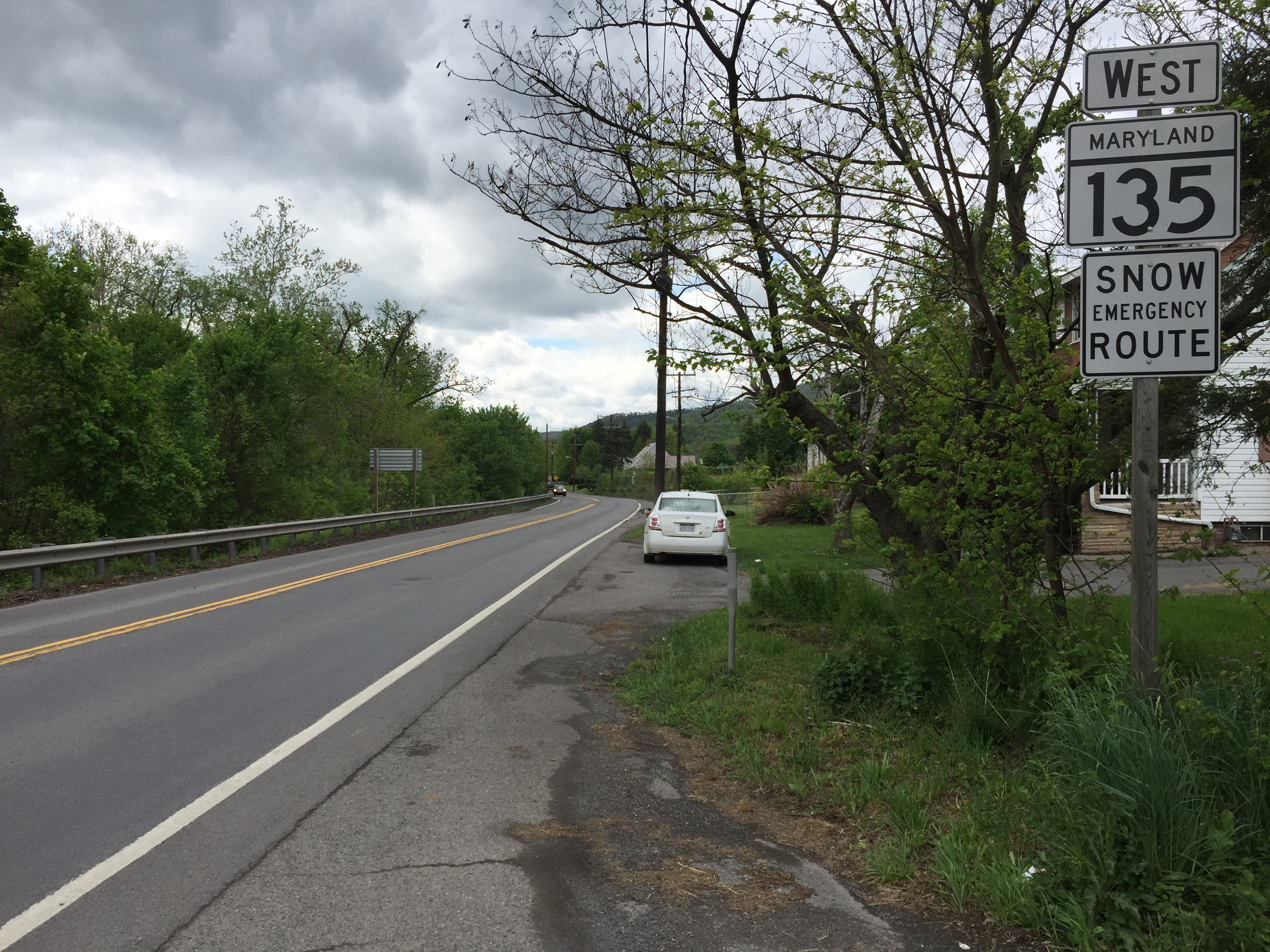
View west from the east end of MD 135 at US 220 in McCoole

MD 135 turns southeast into Allegany County and enters the town of Luke as Pratt Street. The state highway immediately intersects Masteller Road, which is unsigned MD 135D and meets the eastern end of the western segment of West Virginia Route 46 (WV 46) at the North Branch Potomac River. At a bend in the river, MD 135 makes a sharp turn to the north around the mountain and the road passes the large NewPage Corporation paper mill. The state highway turns east and its name changes to Church Street upon entering Westernport, where the highway intersects MD 36 (New Georges Creek Road), which crosses the North Branch Potomac River to become the eastern segment of WV 46. MD 135 crosses Georges Creek and meets the Georges Creek Railway at-grade before intersecting Main Street, which is unsigned MD 937. Upon leaving Westernport, the road's name changes to McCoole–Westernport Road. MD 135 parallels the North Branch Potomac River and Georges Creek Railway as it passes scattered residences and businesses. Upon reaching McCoole, the highway passes unsigned MD 135A, which provides an alternate access route to US 220 north. Shortly after, MD 135 reaches Paxton Street, which is officially MD 135B but is marked as MD 135. Paxton Street leads to a junction with US 220 (McMullen Highway). MD 135 itself continues east under the McCoole–Keyser bridge to its eastern terminus at the intersection of Queens Point Road and Golden Cross Street.

== History ==
Maryland Route 41
- Location: Oakland – Deer Park
- Existed: 1927–1956

The present course of MD 135 consists of the original course of the state highway and its extensions westward, and assumption of a portion of MD 38 and all of MD 41. MD 135 also followed a segment of what is today MD 495. The original segment of MD 135 was under construction between McCoole and Westernport in 1930 and completed by 1931. The state highway was constructed between Bloomington and Luke in 1936 and 1937, including the bridge over the Savage River. This segment was connected to Westernport in 1940 by carving a roadbed out of the cliffs of Franklin Hill. MD 38 was paved from its original northern terminus to Altamont between 1924 and 1926 and to the top of Backbone Mountain by 1930. The present segment of MD 38 south to Kitzmiller was under construction by 1930 and completed by 1933. MD 41 included the first section of what is now MD 135 to be constructed; the segment of the state highway between Oakland and Mountain Lake Park was paved between 1916 and 1919. The state highway was extended past Loch Lynn Heights in 1933 and to MD 38 in Deer Park by 1938.

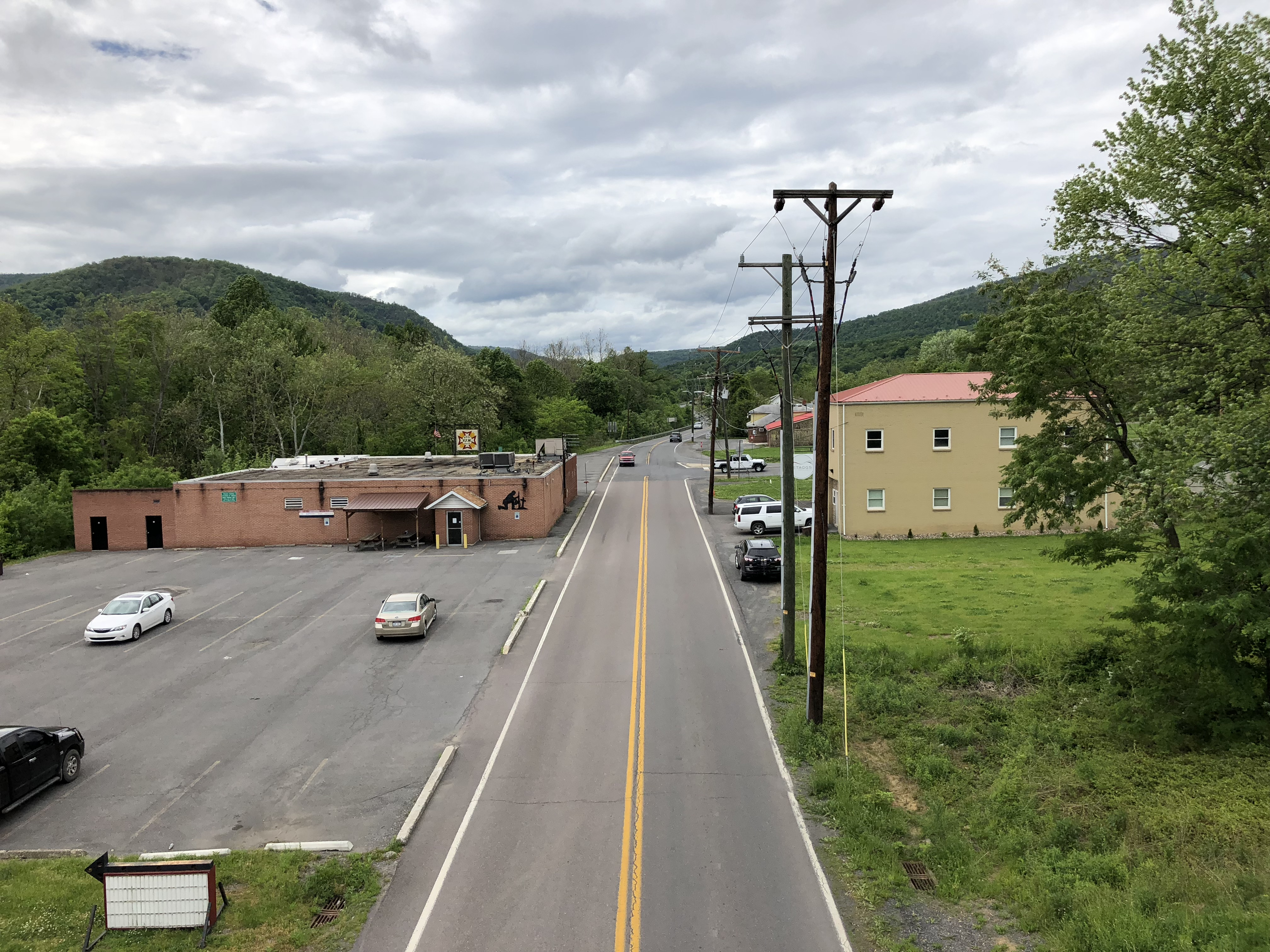
View west along MD 135 from US 220 in McCoole

A second, disconnected segment of MD 135 was constructed in two sections between MD 38 in Altamont and Swanton that were completed in 1933 and 1935. This road was extended east to the top of Backbone Mountain in 1939. The discontinuous segments of MD 135 were unified in 1953 when the pre-existing Bloomington Road was reconstructed between the eastern end of the western MD 135 on top of Backbone Mountain and the western end of the eastern MD 135 in Bloomington. When the present US 220 bridge over the Potomac River was completed in 1951, MD 135 was extended east from its old intersection with US 220, which is today the intersection with MD 135A, to its present eastern terminus.

MD 135 attained its present alignment through several projects in the mid to late 1950s, concurrent with MD 135's extension west over part of MD 38 and all of MD 41 to Oakland in 1956. The segment of MD 38 in Deer Park was bypassed by the newly extended state highway in 1956. The state highway between McCoole and Westernport was relocated, and Bloomington Hill Road was bypassed with a straighter highway featuring a grade-separated crossing of the railroad in Bloomington in 1956 and 1957. The present section of MD 135 between MD 38 and Swanton Road was built in 1955 and 1956; MD 135 was then removed through Swanton and partially replaced by MD 495. The segment between Swanton Road and Bloomington Hill Road was upgraded between 1953 and 1956. Finally, the portion of MD 135 between Deer Park and Oakland, including the bypass of Mountain Lake Park, was rebuilt between 1957 and 1959.

Since the present alignment of MD 135 was completed west of Bloomington in the late 1950s, the descent of Backbone Mountain has become notorious due to its steep grade and the 90 degree turn at the bottom to avoid a mountain dead ahead. A retaining wall at the bottom of the mountain features white crosses in memoriam of those who lost their lives; there were 24 crosses painted as of 2009. After five people had been killed on the descent by 1965, the State Roads Commission responded in 1967 by enacting the truck speed limit of 10 mph (16 km/h), marking the three mandatory stopping areas, and installing ample warning signage, including the infamous "If Brakes Fail Ditch Truck Immediately" sign. In 1997, signs were installed on Interstate 68, US 219, and US 40 advising truckers to use MD 36 instead of MD 135 to access Luke and Westernport. The runaway truck ramp was installed by 2005 and supplemented with a runaway truck warning system and updated signage in 2007.

== Junction list ==
County	Location	mi	km	Destinations	Notes
Garrett	Oakland	0.00	0.00	US 219 (Garrett Highway/Oak Street) / MD 219 north (Ninth Street) – Oakland, Red House, Thomas, WV	Western terminus
Garrett	Mountain Lake Park	1.47	2.37	MD 560 south (Paull Street) – Loch Lynn Heights, Gorman	Northern terminus of MD 560
Garrett	Altamont	7.38	11.88	MD 495 north (Swanton Road) – Swanton, Bittinger	Southern terminus of MD 495
Garrett		11.07	17.82	MD 38 south (Kitzmiller Road) – Kitzmiller	Northern terminus of MD 38
Allegany	Luke	21.93	35.29	Masteller Road to WV 46 west – Jennings Randolph Lake	Unsigned MD 135D
Allegany	Westernport	23.68	38.11	MD 36 (New Georges Creek Road) to WV 46 east (Ashfield Street) – Lonaconing, Frostburg, Piedmont, WV	
Allegany	Westernport	23.75	38.22	MD 937 north (Main Street)	Southern terminus of MD 937
Allegany	McCoole	28.54	45.93	To US 220 north – Cumberland	Unsigned MD 135A
Allegany	McCoole	28.89	46.49	Paxton Street to US 220 – Cumberland, Keyser, WV	Unsigned MD 135B
Allegany	McCoole	29.00	46.67	Queens Point Road east / Golden Cross Street north	Eastern terminus
1.000 mi = 1.609 km; 1.000 km = 0.621 mi

== Auxiliary routes ==
- MD 135A is the unsigned designation for the unnamed 0.78-mile (1.26 km) connector between MD 135 in McCoole and US 220 north of McCoole. The state highway heads north from MD 135 on the western edge of McCoole and passes under US 220. MD 135A curves northwest and intersects Burke Hill Road before reaching its northern terminus at an oblique intersection with US 220 opposite Red Rock Lane. MD 135A is part of the original alignment of US 220 through McCoole prior to the completion of the present alignment in 1951.
- MD 135B is the designation for Paxton Street and Chesapeake Avenue, a 0.11-mile (0.18 km) connector between MD 135 and US 220 in McCoole. MD 135B is signed as MD 135.
- MD 135C is the unsigned designation for an unnamed 0.03-mile (0.048 km) connector between MD 135 and MD 825C, itself an unsigned and unnamed highway, on top of Backbone Mountain east of MD 38. MD 135C provides access to a salt dome.
- MD 135D is the unsigned designation for Masteller Road, a 0.02-mile (0.032 km) connector between MD 135 in Luke and the western segment of WV 46 across the Potomac River in Beryl.
- MD 135E is the designation for Chesapeake Avenue, a 0.09-mile (0.14 km) connector between MD 135 and US 220 in McCoole. MD 135E was designated in 2013.
