= Altamont, Maryland =

Unincorporated community in Maryland, United States

- Unincorporated community
- Location within Maryland Location within the United States
- Coordinates: 39°25′39″N 79°16′55″W
- Country: United States
- State: Maryland
- County: Garrett
- Elevation: 2,628 ft (801 m)
- Time zone: UTC−5 (Eastern (EST))
  - Summer (DST): UTC−4 (EDT)
- GNIS feature ID: 589639

Altamont is an unincorporated community in Garrett County, Maryland, United States. Altamont sits on the Eastern Continental Divide between the watershed of Crabtree Creek, which flows into the Savage River and eventually into the Atlantic Ocean, and the watershed of the Little Youghiogheny River, which flows into the Youghiogheny River and eventually into the Gulf of Mexico. Altamont is notable as the spot at which the B&O Railroad crossed the divide. Today, that same spot is crossed by CSX's Mountain Subdivision. Altamont also features the intersection of Maryland Route 135 (MD 135) and MD 495.

== History ==
The name Altamont has its origin from the Spanish phrase meaning "High Mountain".
