= Maryland Route 560 =

State highway in Maryland, United States

Maryland Route 560
- Maryland Route 560 highlighted in red

Route information
- Maintained by MDSHA
- Length: 9.32 mi (15.00 km)
- Existed: 1933–present
- Tourist routes: Mountain Maryland Scenic Byway

Major junctions
- South end: US 50 in Gorman
- North end: MD 135 in Mountain Lake Park

Location
- Country: United States
- State: Maryland
- Counties: Garrett

Highway system
- Maryland highway system; Interstate; US; State; Scenic Byways
← MD 553	→ MD 561

Maryland Route 560 (MD 560) is a state highway in the U.S. state of Maryland. Known for most of its length as Gorman Road, the state highway runs 9.32 miles (15.00 km) from U.S. Route 50 (US 50) in Gorman north to MD 135 in Mountain Lake Park. MD 560 serves as the main street of Loch Lynn Heights. The state highway also provides a connection through southeastern Garrett County between US 50 on the east side of Backbone Mountain and the Oakland area. MD 560 was constructed from both ends beginning in the early 1930s. The northern segment was extended over Backbone Mountain in the late 1930s, but it was not until 1949 that the gap in MD 560 was filled.

== Route description ==
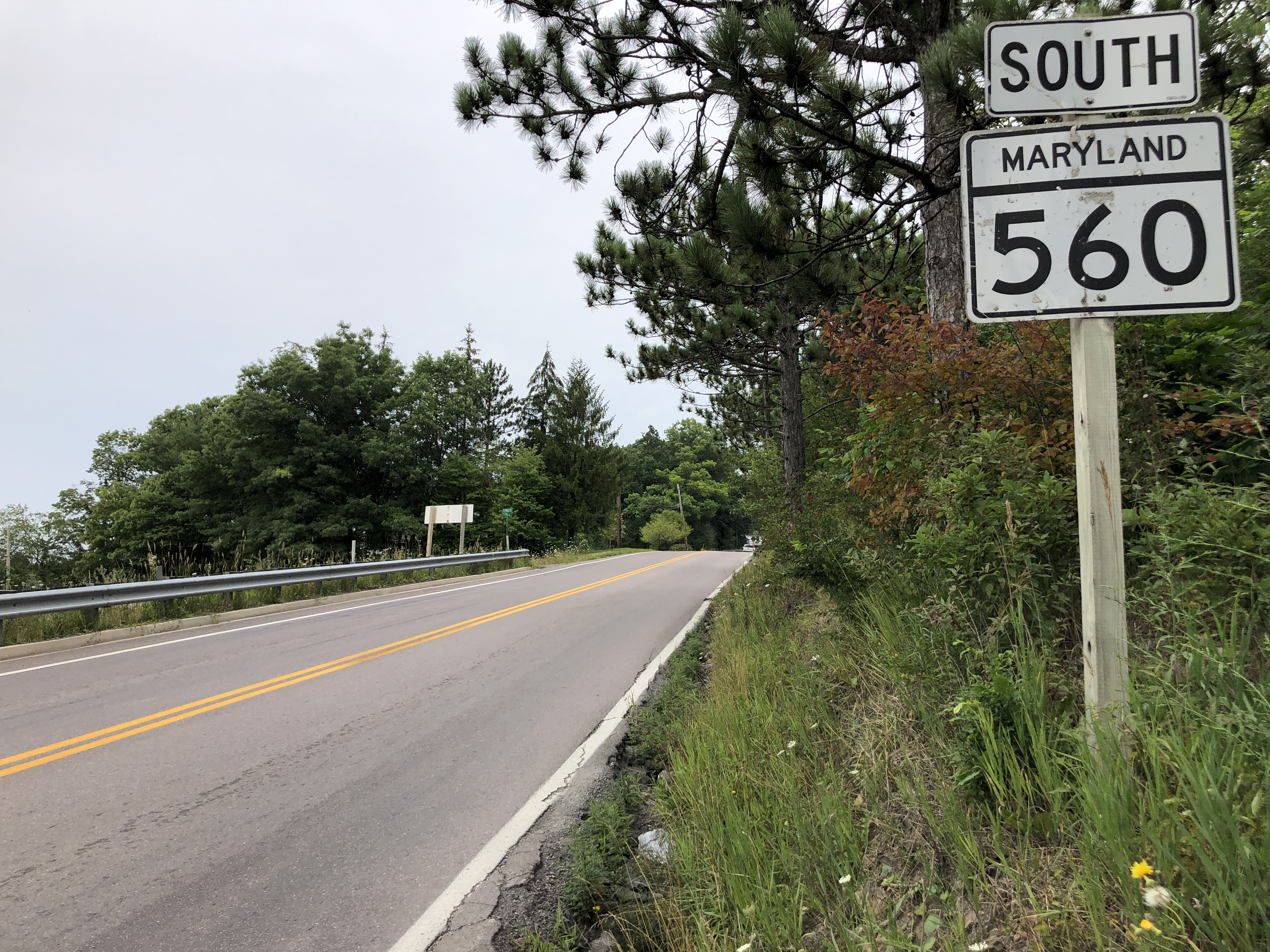
View south along MD 560 in Loch Lynn Heights

MD 560 begins at an intersection with US 50 (George Washington Highway) just west of the North Branch Potomac River and CSX's Thomas Subdivision railroad line in Gorman. After passing through the village and crossing Nydegger Run, the state highway heads north as two-lane undivided Gorman Road through farmland. MD 560 crosses Glade Run and meets White Church Steyer Road next to the hamlet of Kearney before turning northwest and crossing Backbone Mountain at Kelso Gap. After descending the mountain, the state highway turns west toward Loch Lynn Heights. The name of MD 560 changes to Lothian Street upon entering the town limits. At Argyle Street, MD 560 veers west onto Third Street then turns north onto Paull Street. MD 560 leaves Loch Lynn Heights by crossing CSX's Mountain Subdivision railroad line at-grade and enters Mountain Lake Park, where the state highway immediately reaches its northern terminus at MD 135 (Maryland Highway).

== History ==
MD 560 was constructed beginning in 1930 from both the Loch Lynn Heights and Gorman ends. By 1933, the state highway was paved from US 50 north to Le Moyne King Road, and from MD 41 (now MD 135) south to Bethlehem Road just north of Backbone Mountain. The northern section was extended over Backbone Mountain to White Church Steyer Road at Kearney by 1939. MD 560 was a two-part route until the gap between Le Moyne King Road and Kearney was filled in 1949.

== Junction list ==
The entire route is in Garrett County.

Location	mi	km	Destinations	Notes
Gorman	0.00	0.00	US 50 (George Washington Highway) – Red House, Gormania, WV	Southern terminus
Mountain Lake Park	9.32	15.00	MD 135 (Maryland Highway) – Oakland, Westernport	Northern terminus
1.000 mi = 1.609 km; 1.000 km = 0.621 mi
