= Maryland Route 495 =

State highway in Maryland, United States

Maryland Route 495
- Maryland Route 495 highlighted in red

Route information
- Maintained by MDSHA
- Length: 23.02 mi (37.05 km)
- Existed: 1933–present
- Tourist routes: Mountain Maryland Scenic Byway

Major junctions
- South end: MD 135 in Altamont
- I-68 / US 40 / US 219 in Grantsville
- North end: US 40 Alt. in Grantsville

Location
- Country: United States
- State: Maryland
- Counties: Garrett

Highway system
- Maryland highway system; Interstate; US; State; Scenic Byways
← I-495	→ MD 496

Maryland Route 495 (MD 495) is a state highway in the U.S. state of Maryland. Known for most of its length as Bittinger Road, the state highway runs 23.02 miles (37.05 km) from MD 135 in Altamont north to U.S. Route 40 Alternate (US 40 Alt) in Grantsville. MD 495 passes through rural areas of central Garrett County, connecting Bittinger with the northern and southern parts of the county. The state highway also provides an alternate route to US 219 between Interstate 68 (I-68) and resorts around Deep Creek Lake. MD 495 was constructed from both ends starting in the mid-1930s. By the late 1940s, the state highway was complete except for a 5 miles (8.0 km) gap south of Bittinger; this gap was filled in the mid-1950s. The southern terminus of MD 495 was extended to Altamont in 1956.

== Route description ==
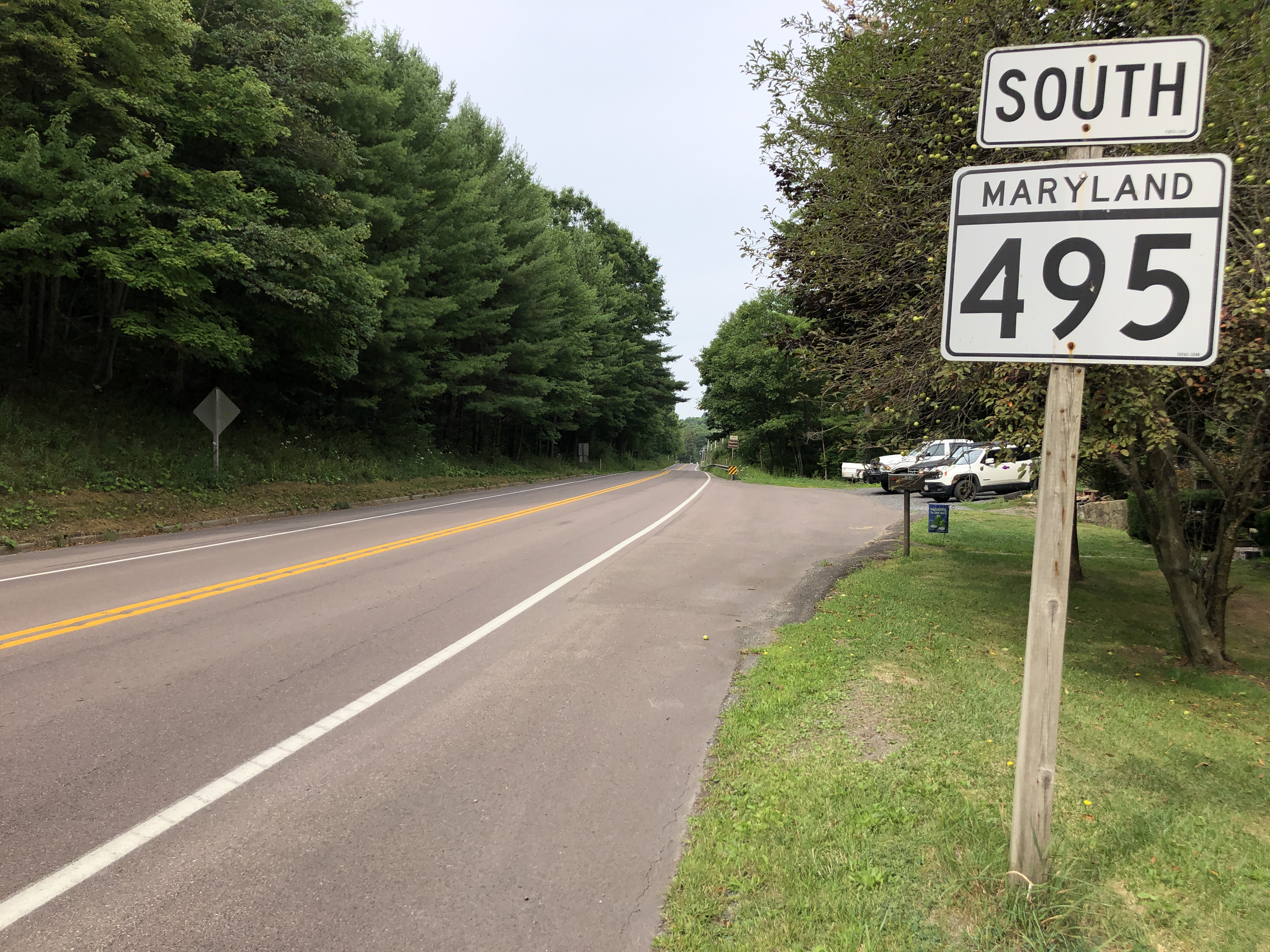
View south along MD 495 in Swanton

MD 495 begins at an intersection with MD 135 (Maryland Highway) in Altamont. The state highway heads northeast as two-lane undivided Swanton Road through the valley of the North Branch of Crabtree Creek. MD 495 crosses the creek a few times before the highway enters the village of Swanton. At the intersection with Swanton Road, the state highway turns north onto Bittinger Road, crosses the creek for the last time, and leaves Swanton. MD 495 crosses Hickory Ridge and enters the watershed of Deep Creek Lake. The state highway crosses several streams that flow into the lake, including Green Glade Run and North Glade Run, and intersects several roads that serve the east side of the lake, including Glendale Road, which heads west to US 219 at Thayerville. After New Germany Road splits to the northeast toward New Germany State Park, MD 495 crosses Meadow Mountain. The state highway passes Rock Lodge Road before heading through the unincorporated village of Bittinger. Near Jennings, MD 495 descends into the valley of the South Branch of the Casselman River between the old alignment, Baker Road, and a brick factory. The state highway crosses the North Branch of the river at the community of Casselman and follows the Casselman River north, crossing Spiker Run and Shade Run. MD 495 leaves the river valley, ascending a hill and reaching a diamond interchange with I-68 (National Freeway), which is concurrent with US 40 and US 219. The state highway enters the town of Grantsville, where its name is Yoder Street, and meets its northern terminus at US 40 Alternate (Main Street).

== History ==
The first section of MD 495 was constructed for 2.6 miles (4.2 km) between US 40 in Grantsville and Fire Clay Road in Casselman in 1933. The state highway was extended south 1.1 miles (1.8 km) to Jennings Road near Jennings in 1938. MD 495 was extended south in two sections—1.6 miles (2.6 km) by the Maryland State Roads Commission and 4.0 miles (6.4 km) as part of a Works Progress Administration project—to Rock Lodge Road in Bittinger in 1940.

The first segment of highway from the south end was completed between MD 38 (now MD 135) in Altamont east to Painters School Road near Swanton by 1933. This southern segment was extended east to Swanton and north to near Upper Green Glade Road in 1935; the Altamont–Swanton segment became part of MD 135, while the section north from Swanton was designated MD 537. The southern section was extended north to North Glade Road in 1936. MD 537 was redesignated as a second section of MD 495 by 1946. The highway was extended north to Glendale Road in 1948. Three changes occurred around 1956. MD 495 was relocated between Casselman and Jennings. The gap between Glendale Road and Rock Lodge Road was closed with the completion of MD 495 over Meadow Mountain. MD 135 was moved to its present alignment atop Backbone Mountain and MD 495 was extended west from Swanton to its present southern terminus at Altamont.

== Junction list ==
The entire route is in Garrett County.

Location	mi	km	Destinations	Notes
Altamont	0.00	0.00	MD 135 (Maryland Highway) – Oakland, Westernport	Southern terminus
Grantsville	22.72	36.56	I-68 / US 40 / US 219 (National Freeway) – Cumberland, Morgantown	I-68 Exit 19
Grantsville	23.02	37.05	US 40 Alt. (Main Street) – Keyser's Ridge, Finzel	Northern terminus
1.000 mi = 1.609 km; 1.000 km = 0.621 mi

== Auxiliary route ==
MD 495A is the designation for Swantamont Road, a 0.16-mile (0.26 km) cut-off between MD 135 and MD 495 southeast of the intersection of the two highways in Altamont.
