= Garrett County Women's Hall of Fame =

Hall of fame in Maryland, United States

The Garrett County Women's Hall of Fame was established in 1995 to honor women who have made contributions to Garrett County, Maryland.
It was created by the Garrett County Commission for Women, who inducts women into the Hall of Fame yearly.

== 1995 ==
- Polly J. Hanst (1906–2007)
- Wilda W. Massi (1941–1999)
- Ruth H. Ryan (1926–1995)

== 1996 ==
- Martha Jachowski (1926–2012)
- Alta E. Schrock (1911–2001)

== 1997 ==
- Edith G. Brock (1919–2016)
- Brenda Butscher (1940–2023)

== 1998 ==
- Jane Bement Avery (1947–2016)
- Martha Glotfelty (1908–1998)

== 1999 ==
- Roberta Anderson
- Ruth Maxine DiPaolo (1929–2009)
- Mary Love (1922–2009)

== 2000 ==
- Alice Hevner (b. 1944)
- Nelle Stemple

== 2001 ==
- Dorothy B. Leighton (1930–2000)
- Phyllis Trickett (b. 1927)

== 2002 ==
- Beverly Beard
- Patricia A. Bowser
- Mary M. Strauss

== 2003 ==
- Joan B. Crawford (1923–2010)
- Barbara B. Flinn
- Mary Ellen Lichty

== 2004 ==
- Bea Crosco
- Mildred Dunbar (1921–2020)
- Mary Jones

== 2005 ==
- Susan Athey-Oxford (1959–2019)
- Cleda Baker (1912–2006)
- Linda Fleming Glotfelty (1943–2022)

== 2006 ==
- Peggy Jamison
- Mary E. Mosser (1923–2009)
- Lorilla Bullard Tower (1870–1963)

== 2007 ==
- Patience Williams Grant
- Helen Louise Harned Kahl
- Sheryl MacLane

== 2008 ==
- Helen Earles (d. 2023)
- Charlotte A. Sebold
- Donna McClintock Fost

== 2009 ==
- Virginia Grove
- Henrietta Lease
- Linda M. Buckel

== 2010 ==
- Debra Friend
- Helen Harman (1933–2024)
- Gail N. Herman

== 2011 ==
- Betty Ellington
- Carolyn Ganoe

== 2012 ==
- Linda Fike
- Grace Jones
- Marilyn Moors

== 2013 ==
- Donna Broadwater
- Jeanette Ruby Fitzwater
- Pat White-Moore

== 2014 ==
- Brenda Snyder Brosnihan
- Nancy K. Learey (1934–2015)

== 2015 ==
- Brenda F. McDonnell
- Karen Myers
- Hannah W. Sincell

== 2016 ==
- Evelyn L. Heise
- Louella Hinebaugh
- Mercedes Pellet

== 2017 ==
- Carol A. Gregg
- Dr. Brenda McCartney
- Ruth Hinebaugh Umbel (1942–2019)

== 2018 ==
- Caroline Blizzard
- Dr. Dana McCauley
- Melissa Rank

== 2019 ==
- Shirley Diane Bailey
- Carissa Rodeheaver

== 2020 ==
- Ruth Cecilia Keller
- Jane Fox
- Cindy Downton

== 2021 ==
- Linda Edwards
- Judy Carbone
- Susan Newton

== 2022 ==
- Heather L. Hanline
- Betty M. Pritt

== 2023 ==
- Bernadine Devine Friend (1927–2013)
- Mary Ruth Sincell McEwen (1963–2022)
- Lillian "Tay" Byrne Sincell (1871–1961)

== 2024 ==
- Marianne Deahl Flinn (1935–2024)
- Dr. Lillian Mitchell

== 2025 ==
- Kathryn Bowser (1919–2020)
- Audrey Kennedy
- Emily Newman-Edwards

== 2026 ==
- Laura Fike
- Kathy Coble
- Donna Brenneman
