= Jennings, Anne Arundel County, Maryland =

Unincorporated community in Maryland, United States

Jennings
- Unincorporated community
- Location within the state of Maryland Jennings (the United States)
- Coordinates: 39°05′25″N 76°33′48″W
- Country: United States
- State: Maryland
- County: Anne Arundel
- Time zone: UTC-5 (Eastern (EST))
  - Summer (DST): UTC-4 (EDT)

Jennings is an unincorporated community in Anne Arundel County, Maryland, United States.
