= Jennings, Garrett County, Maryland =

- Census-designated place
- Location within Maryland Location within the United States
- Coordinates: 39°38′55″N 79°11′01″W
- Country: United States
- State: Maryland
- County: Garrett

Area
  - Total: 0.34 sq mi (0.87 km^{2})
  - Land: 0.34 sq mi (0.87 km^{2})
  - Water: 0 sq mi (0.00 km^{2})
- Elevation: 2,202 ft (671 m)

Population (2020)
  - Total: 99
  - Density: 296.0/sq mi (114.28/km^{2})
- Time zone: UTC-5 (Eastern (EST))
  - Summer (DST): UTC-4 (EDT)
- ZIP code: 21536
- Area codes: 301, 240
- FIPS code: 24-42450
- GNIS feature ID: 2583641

Jennings is an unincorporated area and census-designated place (CDP) in Garrett County, Maryland, United States. At the 2010 census, the population was 113.

The community is in northern Garrett County on Maryland Route 495, 4 miles (6 km) south of Grantsville and 25 miles (40 km) northeast of Oakland, the county seat. Jennings is in the valley of the South Branch of the Casselman River, 3 miles (5 km) west of the Eastern Continental Divide. Water runoff from Jennings flows through the Casselman River north then west to the Youghiogheny River, then to the Monongahela, Ohio, and Mississippi rivers, before flowing to the Gulf of Mexico.

According to the U.S. Census Bureau, the Jennings CDP has an area of 0.34 square miles (0.87 km^{2}), all land.

== Demographics ==
Historical population
Census	Pop.	Note	%±
2020	99		—
U.S. Decennial Census

== History ==
The founding of Jennings began in 1899 when prosperous entrepreneurs, brothers Cortez H. Jennings and B. Worth Jennings from Towanda, Pennsylvania, launched their project to harvest the old growth forest between Grantsville and Bittinger in Garrett County, Maryland. The brothers purchased a few dozen parcels of land. They referred to these lands collectively as Maynadier Lands and Cunningham Lands, which altogether encompassed 10 square miles (26 square km).

Harvesting the timber necessitated that the Jennings brothers create infrastructure. They built a railroad with multiple spurs throughout their land, a sawmill, a hotel, a general store, and provided land for two schools and a church. They hired local men for labor, and they arranged for Hungarian immigrants experienced in the timber trades to relocate to Jennings. They named their new town Jennings.

In addition to their project in Maryland, the brothers launched a similar enterprise in Tucker County, West Virginia, which created the town of Jenningston. In 1906, B. Worth Jennings, age 44, died from a gunshot wound sustained at Jenningston.

As the timber was harvested in Maryland, Cortez Jennings sold numerous parcels of land to local folks, many of whom proceeded to farm the land and raise a family.

In 1920, Cortez Jennings drove from his home in Towanda, Pennsylvania, to Jennings where he became incapacitated by a stroke. He was taken back to Towanda where he died. In 1925, the heirs of the Jennings brothers sold the residue of their numerous enterprises and lands in and around Jennings to William A. Morgart.

Morgart opened a series of coal mines along the eastern bank of the South Branch Casselman River. He used his railroad to haul the coal. William and his wife Rosalie lived in the largest house in Jennings, and they shared it with their son Louis A. Morgart and his wife Lillian.

William Morgart died in 1944. Responsibility for the management of his businesses and real estate passed to Louis. Louis died in 1951. The last of the coal mines closed a few years later.
