= Garrett County, Maryland =

County in Maryland, United States

- County
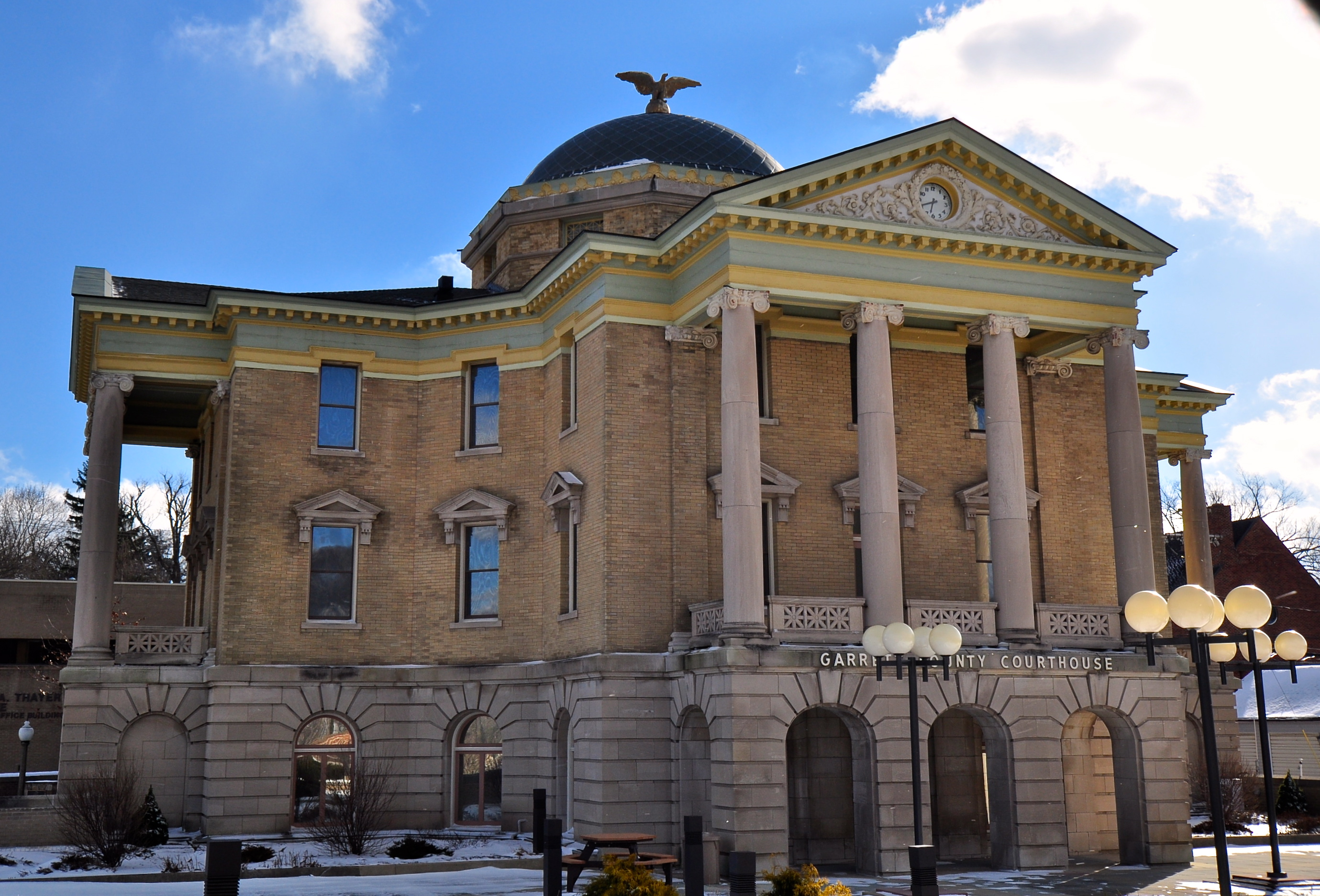
- Garrett County Courthouse in December 2013

- Flag Seal

- Location within the U.S. state of Maryland
- Coordinates: 39°17′N 79°22′W
- Country: United States
- State: Maryland
- Founded: November 4, 1872
- Named for: John Work Garrett
- Seat: Oakland
- Largest town: Mountain Lake Park

Area
  - Total: 656 sq mi (1,700 km^{2})
  - Land: 647 sq mi (1,680 km^{2})
  - Water: 8.6 sq mi (22 km^{2}) 1.3%

Population (2020)
  - Total: 28,806
  - Estimate (2025): 28,370 ▼
  - Density: 44.5/sq mi (17.2/km^{2})
- Time zone: UTC−5 (Eastern)
  - Summer (DST): UTC−4 (EDT)
- Congressional district: 6th
- Website: www.garrettcountymd.gov

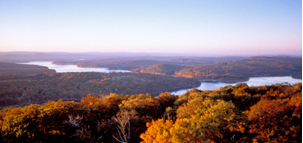
Panoramic view of Deep Creek Lake, Garrett County, MD

Garrett County (/ɡɛrɪt/) is the westernmost county of the U.S. state of Maryland, completely within the Appalachian Mountains. As of the 2020 United States census, the population was 28,806, making it the third-least populous county in Maryland. Its county seat is Oakland. The county was named for John Work Garrett (1820–1884), president of the Baltimore and Ohio Railroad. Created from Allegany County in 1872, it was the last county to be formed in the state. The county is part of the Western Maryland region of the state. Garrett County is bordered by four West Virginia counties and to the north the Maryland–Pennsylvania boundary known as the Mason–Dixon line. The eastern border with Allegany County was defined by the Bauer Report, submitted to Governor Lloyd Lowndes, Jr. on November 9, 1898. The Potomac River and State of West Virginia lie to the south and west.

Garrett County lies in the Allegheny Mountains, which here form the western flank of the Appalachian Mountain Range. Hoye-Crest, a summit along Backbone Mountain, is the highest point in Maryland at an elevation of 3,360 feet (1,020 m).

The Eastern Continental Divide runs along portions of Backbone Mountain. The western part of the county, drained by the Youghiogheny River, is the only part of Maryland within the Mississippi River drainage basin. All other parts of the county are in the Chesapeake Bay basin.

The National Register of Historic Places listings in Garrett County, Maryland has 20 National Register of Historic Places properties and districts, including Casselman Bridge, National Road a National Historic Landmark. Garrett County is part of Maryland's 6th congressional district. The extreme south of the county lies within the United States National Radio Quiet Zone.

== History ==
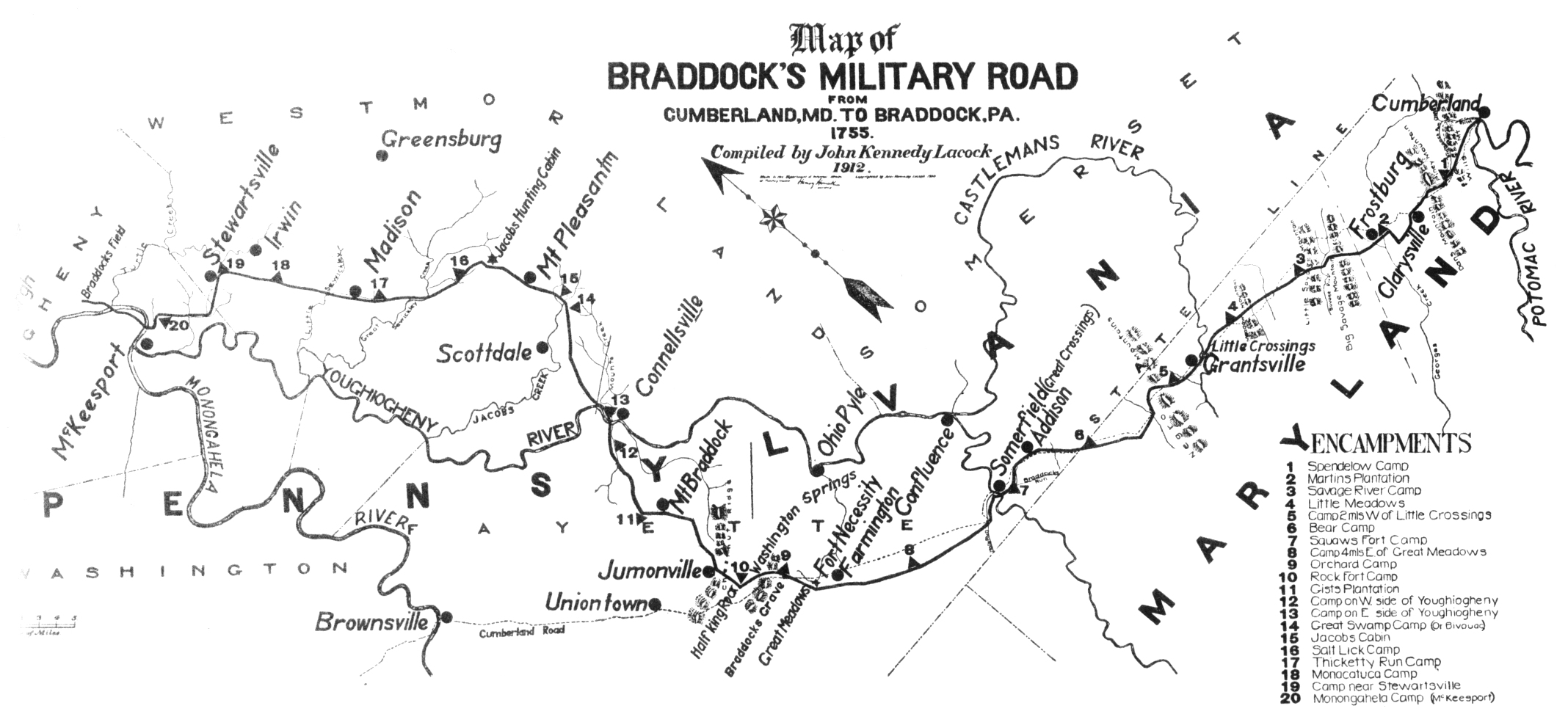
Map of Braddock's Military Road from Cumberland, MD to Braddock, PA 1755

In the early 20th century, the railroad and tourism started to decline. Coal mining and timber production continued at a much slower pace. Today, tourism has made a dramatic rebound in the county with logging and farming making up the greatest part of the economic base. Due to a cool climate and lack of any large city, Garrett County has remained a sparsely populated rural area.

== Geography ==
According to the U.S. Census Bureau, the county has a total area of 656 square miles (1,700 km^{2}), of which 647 square miles (1,680 km^{2}) is land and 8.6 square miles (22 km^{2}) (1.3%) is water. It is the second-largest county in Maryland by land area.

Garrett County is located entirely within the highland zone of the Appalachian Mountains known variously as the Allegheny Mountains, the Allegheny Plateau, and the Appalachian Plateau. The county's highest elevations are located along four flat-topped ridges and range to a height of 3,360 feet (1,020 m) at Hoye-Crest along Backbone Mountain, the highest point in the state of Maryland. As is typical in the Allegheny region, broad flats generally lie below the ridge crests at elevations of approximately 500 feet (150 m). River valleys are generally narrow and deep, with ravines typically 1,000 to 1,800 feet (550 m) below surrounding peaks.

The county contains over 76,000 acres (310 km^{2}) of parks, lakes, and publicly accessible forestland. It is drained by two river systems, the Potomac and the Youghiogheny. The Savage River, a tributary of the Potomac, drains about a third of the county. The Casselman River, a tributary of the Youghiogheny, flows north from the county's central section into Pennsylvania. The Youghiogheny itself drains the westernmost area of the county and flows north into Pennsylvania, where it empties into the Monongahela River at McKeesport, just south of Pittsburgh.

=== Geologic points of interest ===
==== The Glades ====
The Glades' 601 acres (2.43 km^{2}) is of great scientific interest because it is an ombrotrophic system (fed solely by rainwater) with peat layers up to 9 feet (2.7 m) thick, and is one of the oldest examples of mountain peatland in the Appalachians.

On the western edge of the Savage River State Forest along Maryland Route 495 lies Bittinger, Maryland, which is named after Henry Bittinger, who first settled in the area and who was joined by other German settlers moving in and taking up the fertile farmland. On the eastern edge of Bittinger is one of the largest glades area of Garrett County. Geographically, this is an area that seems to have been affected by the last great ice sheet of North America. Two miles southeast of Bittinger, there is a large deposit of peat moss.

==== Loess Dunes ====
In the Casselman River valley, 1-mile (1.6 km) south of Grantsville, Maryland and beside Maryland Route 495, one can see remains of geological evidence about the last great ice sheet over North America. A series of low mounds can be seen in the fields on the west side of Maryland Route 495 that are "loess" (wind-blown) material. Apparently, these are the only ones still visible in the northern part of Garrett County.

The mounds were formed when a glacier lake existed in the Casselman valley, and the ice around the edges of the frozen lake melted. Wind blew fine grains of earth into the water around the edges where it sank to the bottom, and the mounds were the result of the deposit of this wind-blown material.

=== Mountains ===
| Mountain | Elevation (ft.) |
|---|---|
| Backbone Mountain | 3,360 |
| Big Savage Mountain | 2,991 |
| Blossom Hill | 2,620 |
| Contrary Knob | 2,680 |
| Conway Hill | 2,760 |
| Dung Hill | 2,732 |
| Elbow Mountain | 2,694 |
| Elder Hill | 2,826 |
| Fort Hill | 2,600 |
| George Mountain | 3,004 |
| Lewis Knob | 2,960 |
| Little Mountain | 2,920 |
| Little Savage Mountain | 2,817 |
| Marsh Hill | 3,073 |
| Meadow Mountain | 2,959 |
| Mount Nebo | 2,604 |
| Negro Mountain | 3,075 |
| Pine Hill | 2,500 |
| Rich Hill | 2,842 |
| Ridgley Hill | 2,617 |
| River Hill | 2,700 |
| Roman Nose Mountain | 3,140 |
| Roth Rock Mountain | 2,860 |
| Salt Block Mountain | 2,707 |
| Snaggy Hill | 3,040 |
| Walnut Hill | 2,629 |
| Winding Ridge | 2,775 |
| Whites Knob | 2,940 |
| Zehner Hill | 3,000 |

=== Creeks ===
- Bear Creek
- Beaver Creek
- Cherry Creek
- Church Creek
- Crabtree Creek
- Deep Creek (formerly Green Glades Creek)
- Fork Creek
- Georges Creek
- Herrington Creek
- Middle Fork Creek
- Muddy Creek
- North Fork Creek
- Rhine Creek
- Snowy Creek
- South Fork Crabtree Creek
- South Fork Creek

=== Lakes ===
- Deep Creek Lake (largest freshwater body of water in Maryland, 11.6 miles (18.7 km) in length)

=== Waterfalls ===
- Gap Falls
- Muddy Creek Falls (highest free-falling waterfall in State at 54 feet)
- Swallow Falls
- Tolliver Falls

=== Forests, rivers, caves ===
See these articles for information on the forests, rivers, and caves of Garrett County:

- List of Maryland state forests
- List of rivers of Maryland
- Caves of Maryland (Crabtree - largest cave in Maryland)

=== Parks and recreation ===
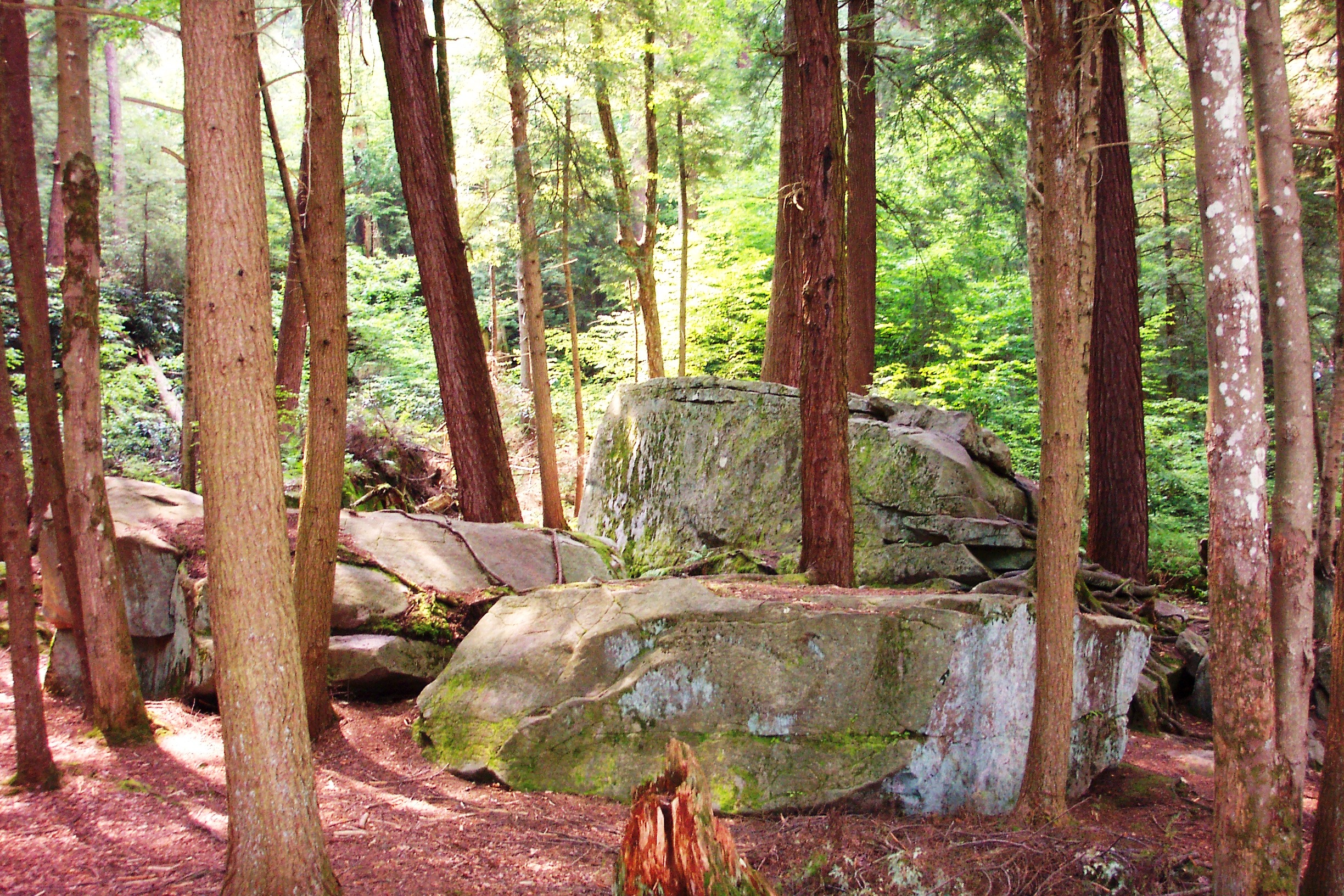
Forest in Swallow Falls State Park

Garrett County contains over 76,000 acres (310 km^{2}) of parks, lakes, and publicly accessible forestland. Popular activities in the county include camping, hiking, backpacking, rock climbing, alpine and cross-country skiing, snowmobiling, hunting, ice fishing, fly fishing, whitewater canoeing, kayaking, rafting, boating, swimming, sailing, horseback riding, and water skiing.

==== State parks ====
There are seven state parks in Garrett County. All offer picnic and fishing areas; all but Casselman River State Park have hiking paths. Mountain bike paths, swimming areas, and boat launches and rentals are available at Deep Creek, Herrington Manor, and New Germany state parks. Rental cabins are available at Herrington Manor and New Germany state parks. Big Run, Deep Creek, Herrington Manor, and New Germany state parks all offer canoeing, while campsites may be found at Big Run, Deep Creek, New Germany, and Swallow Falls state parks.

- Big Run State Park
- Casselman River Bridge State Park (Grantsville)
- Deep Creek Lake State Park (Swanton)
- Herrington Manor State Park (Oakland)
- New Germany State Park (Grantsville)
- Sang Run State Park
- Swallow Falls State Park

==== County parks ====
Garrett County owns four park sites and fifteen recreation facilities. The parks are maintained in cooperation with local associations and civic groups. The recreation areas are attached to public schools and colleges and maintained by the Garrett County Board of Education.

==== Municipal parks ====
The municipal parks of Garrett County provide sport facilities, hiking, bike and walk paths, playgrounds, picnic areas, boat ramps, and fishing.

- Kitzmiller Parks & Recreation Dept.
- Oakland Broadford Park includes swimming, picnic tables, fishing, boat ramp, playgrounds, sports fields.

== Libraries and museums ==
The Ruth Enlow Library was founded in 1915 as the Oakland Free Public Library. Since then, an additional four branches have been added to the library system in Accident, Friendsville, Grantsville, and Kitzmiller. The present director of the library is Thomas Vose.

The Garrett County Historical Society and Museums include a Historical Museum, a Transportation Museum, the Grantsville Museum and the Leo Beachley Photographic Archives.

== Adjacent counties ==
- Fayette County, Pennsylvania (northwest)
- Somerset County, Pennsylvania (north)
- Allegany County, Maryland, (east)
- Grant County, West Virginia (south)
- Mineral County, West Virginia (southeast)
- Preston County, West Virginia (west)

== Demographics ==
Historical population
| Census | Pop. | Note | %± |
|---|---|---|---|
| 1880 | 12,175 | | — |
| 1890 | 14,213 | | 16.7% |
| 1900 | 17,701 | | 24.5% |
| 1910 | 20,105 | | 13.6% |
| 1920 | 19,678 | | −2.1% |
| 1930 | 19,908 | | 1.2% |
| 1940 | 21,981 | | 10.4% |
| 1950 | 21,259 | | −3.3% |
| 1960 | 20,420 | | −3.9% |
| 1970 | 21,476 | | 5.2% |
| 1980 | 26,498 | | 23.4% |
| 1990 | 28,138 | | 6.2% |
| 2000 | 29,846 | | 6.1% |
| 2010 | 30,097 | | 0.8% |
| 2020 | 28,806 | | −4.3% |
| 2025 (est.) | 28,370 | ▼ | −1.5% |
U.S. Decennial Census; 1790-1960 1900-1990; 1990-2000 2010 2020

=== Racial and ethnic composition ===
Garrett County, Maryland – Racial and ethnic composition Note: the US Census treats Hispanic/Latino as an ethnic category. This table excludes Latinos from the racial categories and assigns them to a separate category. Hispanics/Latinos may be of any race.
| Race / Ethnicity (NH = Non-Hispanic) | Pop 1980 | Pop 1990 | Pop 2000 | Pop 2010 | Pop 2020 | % 1980 | % 1990 | % 2000 | % 2010 | % 2020 |
|---|---|---|---|---|---|---|---|---|---|---|
| White alone (NH) | 26,253 | 27,862 | 29,378 | 29,278 | 27,402 | 99.08% | 99.02% | 98.43% | 97.28% | 95.13% |
| Black or African American alone (NH) | 59 | 102 | 127 | 299 | 239 | 0.22% | 0.36% | 0.43% | 0.99% | 0.83% |
| Native American or Alaska Native alone (NH) | 22 | 22 | 22 | 37 | 33 | 0.08% | 0.08% | 0.07% | 0.12% | 0.11% |
| Asian alone (NH) | 52 | 40 | 57 | 76 | 82 | 0.20% | 0.14% | 0.19% | 0.25% | 0.28% |
| Native Hawaiian or Pacific Islander alone (NH) | x | x | 7 | 0 | 2 | x | x | 0.02% | 0.00% | 0.01% |
| Other race alone (NH) | 11 | 2 | 20 | 2 | 54 | 0.04% | 0.01% | 0.07% | 0.01% | 0.19% |
| Mixed race or Multiracial (NH) | x | x | 104 | 185 | 673 | x | x | 0.35% | 0.61% | 2.34% |
| Hispanic or Latino (any race) | 101 | 110 | 131 | 220 | 321 | 0.38% | 0.39% | 0.44% | 0.73% | 1.11% |
| Total | 26,498 | 28,138 | 29,846 | 30,097 | 28,806 | 100.00% | 100.00% | 100.00% | 100.00% | 100.00% |

=== 2020 census ===
As of the 2020 census, the county had a population of 28,806. The median age was 46.8 years. 19.0% of residents were under the age of 18 and 23.6% of residents were 65 years of age or older. For every 100 females there were 97.9 males, and for every 100 females age 18 and over there were 95.9 males age 18 and over. 15.8% of residents lived in urban areas, while 84.2% lived in rural areas.

The racial makeup of the county was 95.5% White, 0.9% Black or African American, 0.1% American Indian and Alaska Native, 0.3% Asian, 0.0% Native Hawaiian and Pacific Islander, 0.5% from some other race, and 2.7% from two or more races. Hispanic or Latino residents of any race comprised 1.1% of the population.

There were 11,954 households in the county, of which 25.3% had children under the age of 18 living with them and 23.8% had a female householder with no spouse or partner present. About 28.2% of all households were made up of individuals and 14.2% had someone living alone who was 65 years of age or older.

There were 18,407 housing units, of which 35.1% were vacant. Among occupied housing units, 77.3% were owner-occupied and 22.7% were renter-occupied. The homeowner vacancy rate was 1.8% and the rental vacancy rate was 10.3%.

=== 2010 census ===
As of the 2010 United States census, there were 30,097 people, 12,057 households, and 8,437 families residing in the county. The population density was 46.5 inhabitants per square mile (18.0/km^{2}). There were 18,854 housing units at an average density of 29.1 per square mile (11.2/km^{2}). The racial makeup of the county was 97.8% white, 1.0% black or African American, 0.3% Asian, 0.1% American Indian, 0.1% from other races, and 0.7% from two or more races. Those of Hispanic or Latino origin made up 0.7% of the population. In terms of ancestry, 35.4% were German, 13.6% identified as American, 11.3% were Irish, and 11.3% were English.

Of the 12,057 households, 30.0% had children under the age of 18 living with them, 56.4% were married couples living together, 9.3% had a female householder with no husband present, 30.0% were non-families, and 25.5% of all households were made up of individuals. The average household size was 2.45 and the average family size was 2.92. The median age was 42.7 years.

The median income for a household in the county was $45,760 and the median income for a family was $56,545. Males had a median income of $40,035 versus $27,325 for females. The per capita income for the county was $23,888. About 8.9% of families and 12.5% of the population were below the poverty line, including 19.2% of those under age 18 and 12.1% of those aged 65 or over.

=== 2000 census ===
As of the census of 2000, there were 29,846 people, 11,476 households, and 8,354 families residing in the county. The population density was 18/km^{2} (46/sq mi). There were 16,761 housing units at an average density of 10/km^{2} (26/sq mi). The racial makeup of the county was 98.83% White, 0.43% Black or African American, 0.07% Native American, 0.19% Asian, 0.02% Pacific Islander, 0.09% from other races, and 0.37% from two or more races. 0.44% of the population were Hispanic or Latino of any race. 36.1% were of German, 22.9% identified as American, 9.6% English and 8.8% Irish ancestry.

There were 11,476 households, out of which 32.60% had children under the age of 18 living with them, 60.70% were married couples living together, 8.40% had a female householder with no husband present, and 27.20% were non-families. 23.50% of all households were made up of individuals, and 10.60% had someone living alone who was 65 years of age or older. The average household size was 2.55 and the average family size was 3.00.

In the county, the population was spread out, with 25.10% under the age of 18, 7.80% from 18 to 24, 27.60% from 25 to 44, 24.60% from 45 to 64, and 14.90% who were 65 years of age or older. The median age was 38 years. For every 100 females, there were 97.20 males. For every 100 females age 18 and over, there were 93.80 males.

The median income for a household in the county was $32,238, and the median income for a family was $37,811. Males had a median income of $29,469 versus $20,673 for females. The per capita income for the county was $16,219. 13.30% of the population and 9.80% of families were below the poverty line. Out of the total people living in poverty, 16.60% are under the age of 18 and 13.90% are 65 or older.

Garrett County is home to an Amish community in the Oakland area that consists of a church district of about 70 homes. The Amish community dates back to 1850 and became associated with the New Order Amish, with electricity permitted inside of homes.

== Politics and government ==
=== Government ===
The county is governed by an elected three-member Board of County Commissioners, whose members serve four-year terms and must live in the district they represent. The Board is the traditional form of county government in Maryland. It may exercise only those powers conferred by the General Assembly of Maryland, and even those powers are narrowly construed.

Garrett County is administered under a line organizational method, with the County Administrator responsible for the general administration of County Government. The administration of the county is centralized with the County Administrator responsible for overseeing the financial planning, annual budget process, personnel management, and direction and management of operations within the organization.

==== County seal ====
On December 15, 1977, the seal of Garrett County went into effect by virtue of Resolution #7. The seal is elliptical, with the name "Garrett County" inscribed above the upper fourth of the ellipse, and "Maryland 1872" inscribed below the lower fourth of the ellipse. The date "1872" depicts the year of the formation of Garrett County. The seal illustrates a large snowflake to depict winter; water to represent sailing; and oaks and conifer to represent the county's mountains. The colors are peacock blue for the sky and water. The blue and white background is divided by kelly green.

==== County flag ====
The official flag for Garrett County is elliptical. The flag illustrates a large snowflake to depict winter; water to represent sailing; and oaks and conifer to represent the county's mountains. The colors are peacock blue for the sky and water. The blue and white background is divided by kelly green.

=== Politics ===
Although since the Civil War Maryland has been a Democratic-leaning state, Garrett County, owing to its history of German settlement from north of the Mason–Dixon line, plus strong pre-war Unionism resulting from virtual absence of slaves, has always been strongly Republican. Since it was created in 1872, Garrett is one of 15 counties across the nation (chiefly Unionist strongholds in antebellum slave states) to have never voted for a Democratic presidential candidate.

Compared with neighbouring and closely allied Grant County, West Virginia, Garrett has not shown quite the same levels of Republican support – Lyndon Johnson did get within 109 votes of Barry Goldwater in 1964 – but as with Grant County, the only occasion Garrett County has not been carried by the official Republican nominee occurred in 1912 when a major split in the Republican Party allowed "Bull Moose Party" nominee and former President Theodore Roosevelt to claim the county. No Democratic presidential nominee has won over 40% of the vote in Garrett since Jimmy Carter in 1976.

Garrett County has been the most conservative county in Maryland in the 21st century. Owing to its strong Republican lean, Garrett County sometimes votes against ballot measures that the rest of the state approves by large margins. In 2022, Garrett County was the only county in the state to vote against legalizing recreational cannabis via Question 4. In 2024, Garrett County was the only county in the state to vote against enshrining a right to abortion in the state constitution via Question 1. Garrett County is part of Maryland's 6th congressional district, which is represented by April McClain Delaney.

=== Voter registration ===
Voter registration and party enrollment as of March 2024
| Republican | 13,710 | 66.38% |
| Democratic | 3,536 | 17.12% |
| Unaffiliated | 3,090 | 14.96% |
| Libertarian | 110 | 0.53% |
| Other parties | 207 | 1% |
| Total | 20,653 | 100% |

United States presidential election results for Garrett County, Maryland
| Year | Republican | | Democratic | | Third party(ies) | |
| Year | No. | % | No. | % | No. | % |
|---|---|---|---|---|---|---|
| 1876 | 995 | 50.43% | 978 | 49.57% | 0 | 0.00% |
| 1880 | 1,210 | 50.59% | 1,124 | 46.99% | 58 | 2.42% |
| 1884 | 1,369 | 52.73% | 1,172 | 45.15% | 55 | 2.12% |
| 1888 | 1,533 | 54.91% | 1,239 | 44.38% | 20 | 0.72% |
| 1892 | 1,556 | 52.57% | 1,323 | 44.70% | 81 | 2.74% |
| 1896 | 2,058 | 60.67% | 1,277 | 37.65% | 57 | 1.68% |
| 1900 | 2,259 | 63.10% | 1,283 | 35.84% | 38 | 1.06% |
| 1904 | 2,051 | 66.96% | 947 | 30.92% | 65 | 2.12% |
| 1908 | 2,055 | 61.97% | 1,121 | 33.81% | 140 | 4.22% |
| 1912 | 655 | 22.43% | 1,005 | 34.42% | 1,260 | 43.15% |
| 1916 | 1,808 | 61.21% | 1,031 | 34.90% | 115 | 3.89% |
| 1920 | 2,805 | 70.25% | 1,070 | 26.80% | 118 | 2.96% |
| 1924 | 2,594 | 61.79% | 1,226 | 29.20% | 378 | 9.00% |
| 1928 | 4,371 | 78.38% | 1,168 | 20.94% | 38 | 0.68% |
| 1932 | 3,048 | 56.00% | 2,232 | 41.01% | 163 | 2.99% |
| 1936 | 4,057 | 55.03% | 3,252 | 44.11% | 64 | 0.87% |
| 1940 | 4,387 | 60.68% | 2,805 | 38.80% | 38 | 0.53% |
| 1944 | 4,162 | 67.97% | 1,961 | 32.03% | 0 | 0.00% |
| 1948 | 3,536 | 64.34% | 1,909 | 34.73% | 51 | 0.93% |
| 1952 | 4,980 | 68.42% | 2,281 | 31.34% | 18 | 0.25% |
| 1956 | 5,555 | 73.09% | 2,045 | 26.91% | 0 | 0.00% |
| 1960 | 5,057 | 68.21% | 2,357 | 31.79% | 0 | 0.00% |
| 1964 | 3,624 | 50.76% | 3,515 | 49.24% | 0 | 0.00% |
| 1968 | 4,021 | 59.38% | 1,933 | 28.54% | 818 | 12.08% |
| 1972 | 5,480 | 76.60% | 1,510 | 21.11% | 164 | 2.29% |
| 1976 | 4,640 | 58.20% | 3,332 | 41.80% | 0 | 0.00% |
| 1980 | 5,475 | 64.07% | 2,708 | 31.69% | 362 | 4.24% |
| 1984 | 7,042 | 74.31% | 2,386 | 25.18% | 49 | 0.52% |
| 1988 | 6,665 | 71.81% | 2,557 | 27.55% | 60 | 0.65% |
| 1992 | 5,714 | 54.01% | 2,856 | 26.99% | 2,010 | 19.00% |
| 1996 | 5,400 | 55.18% | 3,121 | 31.89% | 1,265 | 12.93% |
| 2000 | 7,514 | 70.52% | 2,872 | 26.95% | 269 | 2.52% |
| 2004 | 9,085 | 72.77% | 3,291 | 26.36% | 108 | 0.87% |
| 2008 | 8,903 | 69.17% | 3,736 | 29.02% | 233 | 1.81% |
| 2012 | 9,743 | 74.05% | 3,124 | 23.74% | 290 | 2.20% |
| 2016 | 10,776 | 76.91% | 2,567 | 18.32% | 668 | 4.77% |
| 2020 | 12,002 | 76.88% | 3,281 | 21.02% | 328 | 2.10% |
| 2024 | 11,983 | 75.66% | 3,456 | 21.82% | 399 | 2.52% |

=== Law enforcement ===
The county is policed by the Garrett County Sheriff's Office and the Maryland State Police.

The state parks are policed by the Department of Natural Resources Police.

The county established an Office of the Fire Marshal in 2022, working in collaboration with the Maryland State Office established in 1894.

== Economy ==
Garrett County produces natural gas, the only county in the state to do so. Much of the economic activity in the area centers around tourism. In the winter, the Wisp ski resort in Oakland and New Germany State Park's cross-country skiing trail are frequent destinations, and Deep Creek Lake sees much activity in the summer. The state parks in the county are frequented year-round. During the COVID-19 pandemic, tourism boomed as many people from Washington, DC, Baltimore, and Pittsburgh wanted to get away from the city.

== Transportation ==
=== Major highways ===
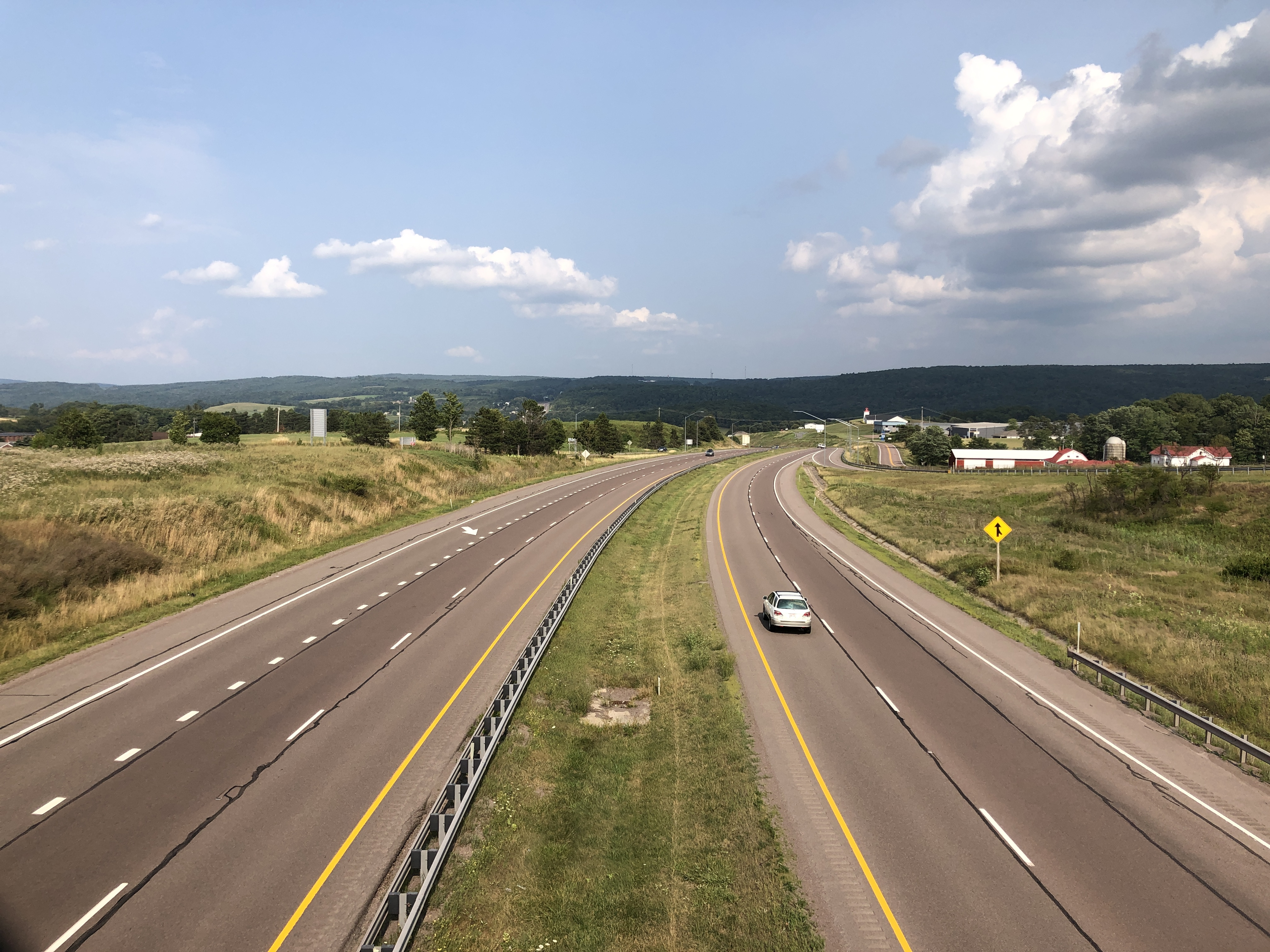
I-68/US 40 eastbound and US 219 northbound at MD 495 in Garrett County

- I-68
- US 40
- US 40 Alt.
- US 50
- US 219
- US 219 Bus.
- MD 38
- MD 39
- MD 42
- MD 135
- MD 495
- MD 546
- MD 560
- MD 669
- MD 946

=== Airport ===
Garrett County Airport (2G4) is a general aviation airport surrounded by the mountains of Western Maryland. The airport enhances the region's tourist industry and provides emergency air service evacuation and landing facilities for general aviation.

== Media ==
Garrett County is part of the Pittsburgh, Pennsylvania television market. KDKA-TV and WTAE-TV in Pittsburgh, Pennsylvania, and WJAC-TV in Johnstown, Pennsylvania serves Oakland, the county seat. Oakland also has an educational television station (by way of PBS member station WGPT, part of state-wide Maryland Public Television; it is also served by Pittsburgh-based member station WQED).

It has a weekly newspaper, the Garrett County Republican, which was purchased by NCWV Media in 2017.

== Events ==
Annual events include the Autumn Glory Festival, the Scottish Highland Festival, and the Garrett County Agricultural Fair.

== Communities ==
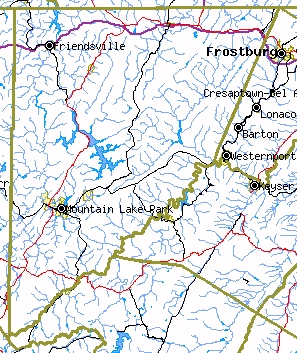
Garrett County Maryland

=== Towns ===
- Accident
- Deer Park
- Friendsville
- Grantsville
- Kitzmiller
- Loch Lynn Heights
- Mountain Lake Park
- Oakland (county seat)

=== Census-designated places ===
The United States Census Bureau recognizes seven census-designated places (CDPs) in Garrett County.

- Bloomington
- Crellin
- Finzel
- Gorman
- Hutton
- Jennings
- Swanton

=== Unincorporated communities ===
The following communities are classified as populated places or locales by the Geographic Names Information System.

- Altamont (39°25′39″N 79°16′55″W) is where CSX's Mountain Subdivision rail line crosses the Eastern Continental Divide just west of the railroad's underpass of MD 135 east of Deer Park.
- Asher Glade (39°42′14″N 79°26′50″W) is at the intersection of MD 42 and Asher Glade Road northwest of Friendsville and a short distance south of the Pennsylvania state line near Markleysburg, Pennsylvania.
- Avilton (39°39′01″N 79°02′32″W) is at the intersection of Avilton Lonaconing Road and Green Lantern Road southwest of Finzel.
- Bethel (39°26′42″N 79°07′07″W) is at the intersection of Walnut Bottom Road and Chestnut Grove Road near Jennings Randolph Lake southwest of Bloomington.
- Bevansville (39°39′15″N 79°11′34″W) is at the intersection of MD 495 and Durst Road west of Jennings.
- Bittinger (39°36′08″N 79°13′24″W) is at the intersection of MD 495 and Orendorf Road north of Swanton and south of Grantsville.
- Blooming Rose (39°39′24″N 79°26′21″W) is at the intersection of MD 42 and Blooming Rose Road west of Friendsville.
- Casselman (39°40′31″N 79°10′18″W) is at the intersection of MD 495 and Maple Grove Road along the Casselman River south of Grantsville.
- Cove (39°40′49″N 79°18′00″W) is at the intersection of Cove Road and Cove Run north of Accident.
- East Vindex (39°25′04″N 79°11′14″W) is on Vindex Road north of Kitzmiller.
- Elder Hill (39°37′28″N 79°23′28″W) is at the intersection of MD 42 and Kisner Road south of Friendsville.
- Engle Mill (39°38′49″N 79°17′11″W) is at the intersection of Fish Hatchery Road and Bowman Hill Road northeast of Accident.
- Fairview (39°35′36″N 79°08′46″W) is at the intersection of Fairview Road and Peapatch Lane south of Grantsville.
- Floyd (39°30′15″N 79°09′20″W) is at the intersection of Savage River Road and Spring Lick Road west of Bloomington.
- Fort Pendleton (39°17′43″N 79°22′27″W) is on US 50 west of Gorman and east of Backbone Mountain.
- Foxtown (39°37′57″N 79°14′18″W) is at the intersection of Dung Hill Road and Amish Road west of Jennings.
- Fricks Crossing (39°24′41″N 79°20′00″W) is where Fricks Crossing Road intersects CSX's Mountain Subdivision rail line and crosses the Little Youghiogheny River southwest of Deer Park.
- Gortner (39°21′18″N 79°25′39″W) is at the intersection of US 219 and Mason School Road south of Oakland.
- Gravel Hill (39°39′50″N 79°23′35″W) is on Friendsville Addison Road east of Friendsville.
- Green Glade (39°28′26″N 79°15′53″W) is on Green Glade Road along the south side of Green Glade Cove, a branch of Deep Creek Lake.
- Hazelhurst (39°28′13″N 79°16′17″W) is on Hazelhurst Road along the south side of Green Glade Cove, a branch of Deep Creek Lake.
- Herrington Manor (39°27′10″N 79°27′11″W) is the location of Herrington Manor State Park northwest of Oakland.
- Hi-Point (39°42′21″N 79°12′38″W) is where US 40 Alternate crosses the top of Negro Mountain west of Grantsville. This location was the highest point on the National Road.
- High Point (39°41′41″N 79°06′15″W) is at the intersection of US 40 Alternate and US 219 east of Grantsville.
- Hoyes (39°35′25″N 79°22′10″W) is at the intersection of MD 42 and Hoyes Sang Run Road southwest of Accident.
- Hoyes Run (39°31′41″N 79°24′38″W) is at the intersection of Oakland Sang Run Road and Hoyes Run Road along the Youghiogheny River west of Deep Creek Lake.
- Kaese Mill (39°39′01″N 79°17′46″W) is at the intersection of Collier Road and Fish Hatchery Road east of US 219's junction with Fish Hatchery Road and northeast of Accident.
- Kearney (39°20′35″N 79°19′20″W) is at the intersection of White Church Steyer Road and Le Moyne King Road southeast of Loch Lynn Heights.
- Keeler Glade (39°37′46″N 79°28′40″W) is along Blooming Rose Road just east of the Maryland–West Virginia state line.
- Kempton (39°12′24″N 79°29′07″W) is on Kempton Road next to the Potomac River in the southwestern corner of Garrett County where the Maryland–West Virginia state line changes from the river to a north–south line.
- Kendall (39°38′00″N 79°25′03″W) is on the Youghiogheny River south of Friendsville and north of Sang Run.
- Keysers Ridge (39°41′37″N 79°14′53″W) is at the junctions of I-68, US 40, US 219, and US 40 Alternate west of Grantsville.
- Lake Ford (39°31′36″N 79°28′48″W) is at the intersection of Cranesville Road and Lake Ford Road south of the Cranesville Swamp Preserve just east of the Maryland–West Virginia state line.
- Locust Grove (39°39′12″N 79°27′34″W) is at the intersection of Noah Frazee Road and Sand Spring Road west of Friendsville.
- McComas Beach (39°30′06″N 79°22′23″W) is on Mayhew Inn Road along Red Run Cove near the west end of Deep Creek Lake.
- McHenry (39°33′30″N 79°21′10″W) is at the intersection of US 219 and Mosser Road on March Run Cove at the north end of Deep Creek Lake.
- Merrill (39°35′56″N 79°04′59″W) is where Westernport Road crosses the Savage River within Savage River State Forest west of Lonaconing.
- Mineral Spring (39°42′29″N 79°21′01″W) is at the confluence of Mill Run and Cove Run east of Youghiogheny River Lake northeast of Friendsville.
- Mitchell Manor (39°25′07″N 79°23′46″W) is a neighborhood east of Cherry Glade Run just north of the town of Oakland.
- New Germany (39°37′57″N 79°07′20″W) is along New Germany Road adjacent to New Germany State Park south of Grantsville.
- North Glade (39°30′03″N 79°14′12″W) is at the intersection of MD 495 and North Glade Road east of Deep Creek Lake.
- Piney Grove (39°41′05″N 79°04′23″W) is at the intersection of US 40 Alternate and Avilton Lonaconing Road.
- Redhouse (39°18′31″N 79°27′14″W) is at the intersection of US 50 and US 219 south of Oakland and west of Backbone Mountain.
- Ryan's Glade stretches along the common border with Grant County, West Virginia from about midway between Mountain Lake Park and Gormania to the southwestern corner of the county near Wilsonia.
- Sand Spring (39°40′21″N 79°27′34″W) is at the intersection of Sand Spring Road and Fearer Road west of Friendsville.
- Sang Run (39°34′05″N 79°25′21″W) is at the intersection of Sang Run Road and Oakland Sang Run Road west of McHenry
- Schell (39°20′31″N 79°15′35″W) is at the confluence of Laurel Run and the Potomac River northeast of Gorman.
- Selbysport (39°41′11″N 79°22′49″W) is at the intersection of Friendsville Addison Road and Old Morgantown Road north of Friendsville.
- Shallmar (39°22′46″N 79°12′17″W) is along Shallmar Road along the Potomac River west of Kitzmiller.
- Standard (39°24′54″N 79°10′31″W) is at the confluence of Three Forks Run and the Potomac River north of Kitzmiller.
- Stanton Mill (39°42′04″N 79°08′13″W) is where River Road crosses the Casselman River east of Grantsville.
- Steyer (39°18′20″N 79°18′39″W) is at the intersection of White Church Steyer Road and Steyer Gorman Road near the Potomac River east of Gorman.
- Strawn (39°43′16″N 79°17′48″W) is along US 40 just south of the Maryland–Pennsylvania state line west of Keysers Ridge. Formerly known as Oakton.
- Strecker (39°28′30″N 79°11′27″W) is along Crabtree Creek and CSX's Mountain Subdivision between Swanton and Savage River Reservoir.
- Sunnyside (39°20′25″N 79°26′49″W) is at the intersection of US 219 and Ben Dewitt Road north of Redhouse.
- Table Rock (39°18′05″N 79°25′02″W) is at the intersection of US 50 and Table Rock Road on top of Backbone Mountain.
- Tasker Corners (39°21′44″N 79°17′39″W) is at the junctions of Bethlehem Road, Steyer Mine Road, Schell Road, and Potomac Camp Road southeast of Loch Lynn Heights and southwest of Kitzmiller.
- Thayerville (39°30′06″N 79°19′36″W) is at the intersection of US 219 and Glendale Road next to Deep Creek Lake.
- Wallman (39°19′01″N 79°17′02″W) is along Wallman Road along the Potomac River northeast of Gorman.
- West Vindex (39°25′03″N 79°12′20″W) is along Vindex Road north of Kitzmiller.
- There are two locations named Wilson:
  - One Wilson (39°25′56″N 79°16′13″W) is along Old Wilson Road at the source of the South Fork of Crabtree Creek east of Altamont.
  - The other Wilson (39°15′15″N 79°23′52″W) is in both Maryland and West Virginia on either side of the Wilson Bridge across the Potomac River southwest of Gorman.
- Winding Ridge (39°41′17″N 79°19′32″W) is at the intersection of Cove Road and Old Morgantown Road north of Accident.

== Education ==
Garrett College is a public community college in McHenry, Maryland. The college had three outreach centers in Accident, Grantsville, and Oakland.

Garrett County Public Schools operates public schools. There are two public high schools in the county, Southern Garrett High School and Northern Garrett High School, two public middle schools, Southern Garrett Middle School and Northern Garrett Middle School, and seven public elementary schools, Accident Elementary School, Broad Ford Elementary School, Crellin Elementary School, Friendsville Elementary School, Grantsville Elementary School, Route 40 Elementary School, and Yough Glades Elementary School. There is also one K-8 public school in the county, which is Swan Meadow School.

== See also ==
- USS Garrett County (LST-786)
- Meshach Browning
- National Register of Historic Places listings in Garrett County, Maryland
- Garrett County Women's Hall of Fame
- History of Deep Creek Lake, Maryland
- 1964 Savage Mountain B-52 crash
