= New Germany State Park =

State park in Maryland, United States

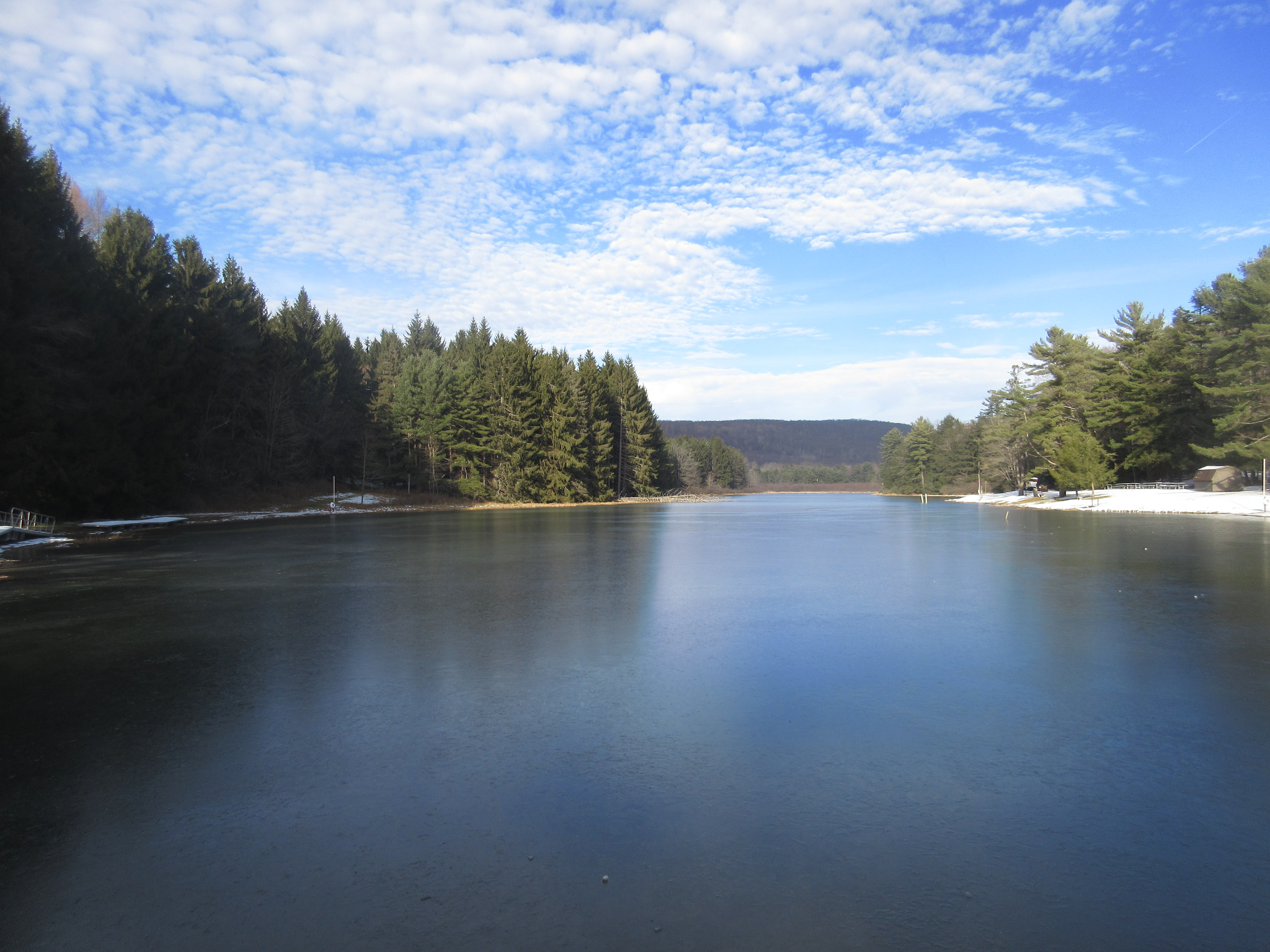
- Reservoir at New Germany State Park

- Location within Maryland
- Location: Garrett County, Maryland, United States
- Nearest town: Grantsville, Maryland
- Coordinates: 39°38′07″N 79°07′15″W
- Area: 508 acres (206 ha)
- Elevation: 2,471 ft (753 m)
- Established: 1930s
- Administrator: Maryland Department of Natural Resources
- Designation: Maryland state park
- Website: Official website

New Germany State Park is a Maryland state park covering 508 acres (206 ha) adjacent to the Savage River State Forest in Garrett County, Maryland. The park is administered by the Maryland Department of Natural Resources.

== History ==
The park's lake was created when settlers John and Charles Swauger dammed Poplar Lick Run to create water power for the operation of a sawmill and grist mill. The lake was expanded to thirteen acres when the Civilian Conservation Corps replaced the original dam with a larger one. The CCC was active in the park from 1933 until 1942, maintaining forest roads, planting trees, and adding day-use facilities including bathhouse, gazebo, and picnic shelters. The CCC also built cabins for overnight stays and slopes that created the state's first ski resort. The CCC's recreation hall and officers quarters are still in use in the park.

== Activities and amenities ==
The park's 13-acre (5.3 ha) lake offers fishing, swimming, and a boat launch for canoeing and non–gas-powered boating. The park's 10 miles (16 km) of trails are used for hiking, biking, and cross-country skiing. Other amenities include cabins, campsites, nature center, snack bar, and picnicking facilities. The lake is stocked with trout in the spring, and a trout stamp is required to possess trout. Nature programs and kayak rentals are offered in summer. Cross-country skis and snowshoes are available for rent in the winter.
