= Gorman, Maryland =

- Census-designated place
- Location within Maryland Location within the United States
- Coordinates: 39°17′34″N 79°21′10″W
- Country: United States
- State: Maryland
- County: Garrett

Area
  - Total: 1.25 sq mi (3.25 km^{2})
  - Land: 1.25 sq mi (3.25 km^{2})
  - Water: 0 sq mi (0.00 km^{2})
- Elevation: 2,602 ft (793 m)

Population (2020)
  - Total: 85
  - Density: 67.8/sq mi (26.17/km^{2})
- Time zone: UTC-5 (Eastern (EST))
  - Summer (DST): UTC-4 (EDT)
- ZIP code: 21550
- Area codes: 240 and 301
- FIPS code: 24-34150
- GNIS feature ID: 2583633

Gorman is a census-designated place (CDP) along the North Branch Potomac River in southern Garrett County, Maryland, United States. As of the 2020 census, Gorman's population was 85. Gorman lies on Gorman Road (Maryland Route 560) off the Northwestern Turnpike (U.S. Route 50), which crosses the North Branch into Gormania, West Virginia, via Gormania Bridge. Like Gormania, the town is named for United States Senator from Maryland, Arthur Pue Gorman (March 11, 1839 – June 4, 1906).

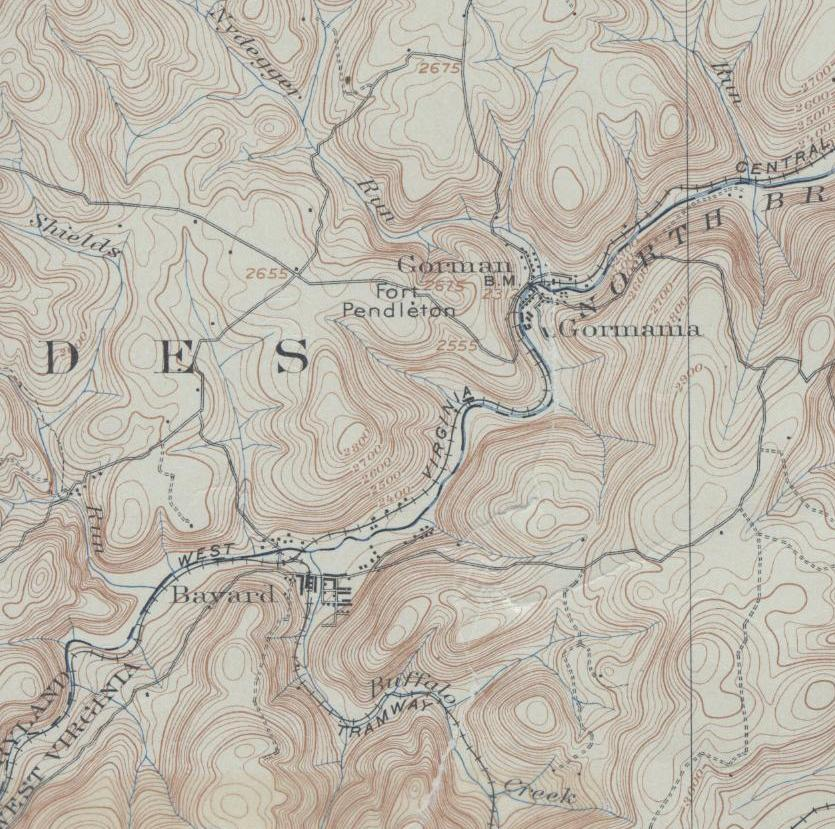
The towns of Bayard, Gorman, and Gormania on a 1900 USGS topographic map

== Demographics ==
Historical population
Census	Pop.	Note	%±
2020	85		—
U.S. Decennial Census
