= Bittinger, Maryland =

Unincorporated community in Maryland, United States

- Unincorporated community
- Location within Maryland Location within the United States
- Coordinates: 39°36′8″N 79°13′24″W
- Country: United States
- State: Maryland
- County: Garrett
- Elevation: 2,690 ft (820 m)
- Time zone: UTC-5 (Eastern (EST))
  - Summer (DST): UTC-4 (EDT)
- ZIP codes: 21522
- GNIS feature ID: 588618

Bittinger is an unincorporated community in northeastern Garrett County, Maryland, United States, on the western edge of the Savage River State Forest. It lies along Maryland Route 495 northeast of the city of Oakland, the county seat of Garrett County. Its elevation is 2,690 feet (820 m). Although Bittinger is unincorporated, it has a post office, with the ZIP code of 21522. The post office was established in 1885.

== Climate ==
The climate in this area has mild differences between highs and lows, and there is adequate rainfall year-round. According to the Köppen Climate Classification system, Bittinger has a marine west coast climate, abbreviated "Cfb" on climate maps.
