= National Register of Historic Places listings in Garrett County, Maryland =

Location of Garrett County in Maryland

This is a list of the National Register of Historic Places listings in Garrett County, Maryland.

This is intended to be a complete list of the properties and districts on the National Register of Historic Places in Garrett County, Maryland, United States. Latitude and longitude coordinates are provided for many National Register properties and districts; these locations may be seen together in a map.

There are 20 properties and districts listed on the National Register in the county, including 1 National Historic Landmark.

Contents: Counties in Maryland
Allegany - Anne Arundel - Baltimore (city) - Baltimore County - Calvert - Caroline - Carroll - Cecil - Charles - Dorchester - Frederick - Garrett - Harford - Howard - Kent - Montgomery - Prince George's - Queen Anne's - Somerset - St. Mary's - Talbot - Washington - Wicomico - Worcester

This National Park Service list is complete through NPS recent listings posted May 1, 2026.

== Current listings ==
	Name on the Register	Image	Date listed	Location	City or town	Description
1	Anderson Chapel	Anderson Chapel	June 7, 1984 (#84001775)	Swanton Hill and Pine Hill Rds. 39°27′34″N 79°13′53″W	Swanton	
2	Baltimore and Ohio Railroad Station, Oakland	Baltimore and Ohio Railroad Station, Oakland	February 5, 1974 (#74000953)	Liberty St. 39°24′35″N 79°24′47″W	Oakland	
3	Bloomington Viaduct	Bloomington Viaduct	November 21, 1976 (#76000996)	Over the Potomac River south of Maryland Route 135; 39°28′37″N 79°04′05″W	Bloomington	
4	Borderside		October 29, 1975 (#75000898)	Oakland-Westernport Rd. 39°28′43″N 79°04′21″W	Bloomington	
5	Casselman's Bridge, National Road	Casselman's Bridge, National Road	October 15, 1966 (#66000391)	East of Grantsville on U.S. Route 40; 39°41′48″N 79°08′37″W	Grantsville	
6	Creedmore	Creedmore	December 27, 1984 (#84000505)	510 G St. 39°23′59″N 79°22′59″W	Mountain Lake Park	
7	James Drane House	James Drane House	January 11, 1985 (#85000059)	Accident-Bittinger Rd. 39°37′45″N 79°18′47″W	Accident	
8	Fuller-Baker Log House	Fuller-Baker Log House	February 12, 1971 (#71000375)	0.5 miles west of Grantsville on U.S. Route 40; 39°41′45″N 79°10′20″W	Grantsville	
9	Garrett County Courthouse	Garrett County Courthouse	November 12, 1975 (#75000899)	3rd and Alder Sts. 39°24′26″N 79°24′25″W	Oakland	
10	Glamorgan		September 13, 1984 (#84001778)	Maryland Route 135; 39°25′46″N 79°19′29″W	Deer Park	
11	Hoye Site	Hoye Site	May 12, 1975 (#75000900)	Address Restricted	Oakland	
12	Inns on the National Road	Inns on the National Road	December 22, 1976 (#76000976)	East and west of Cumberland on U.S. Route 40 from Flintstone to Grantsville; 39°41′49″N 79°08′31″W	Grantsville	
13	Kaese Mill	Kaese Mill	September 13, 1984 (#84001782)	North of Accident; 39°39′02″N 79°17′49″W	Accident	
14	Mercy Chapel at Mill Run	Mercy Chapel at Mill Run	September 7, 1984 (#84001792)	Mill Run Rd. 39°42′40″N 79°22′19″W	Selbysport	
15	Meyer Site		June 19, 1973 (#73000921)	Address Restricted	Westernport	
16	Mountain Lake Park Historic District	Mountain Lake Park Historic District	September 1, 1983 (#83002948)	Roughly bounded by Alleghany Dr., Oakland Ave., and D and N Sts. 39°23′49″N 79°22′53″W	Mountain Lake Park	
17	Oakland Historic District	Oakland Historic District	January 26, 1984 (#84001798)	Roughly bounded by Oak, 8th, High, 3rd, Omaha, and Bartlet Sts. 39°24′35″N 79°24′20″W	Oakland	
18	Pennington Cottage	Pennington Cottage	May 17, 1976 (#76000997)	Deer Park Hotel Rd. 39°25′12″N 79°20′00″W	Deer Park	
19	Stanton's Mill	Stanton's Mill	January 17, 1983 (#83002949)	East of Grantsville on U.S. Route 40; 39°41′48″N 79°08′25″W	Grantsville	
20	Tomlinson Inn and the Little Meadows	Tomlinson Inn and the Little Meadows	September 20, 1973 (#73000920)	3 miles east of Grantsville on U.S. Route 40; 39°41′37″N 79°05′46″W	Grantsville	

== See also ==
- List of National Historic Landmarks in Maryland
- National Register of Historic Places listings in Maryland
