= Baldwin & Pennington =

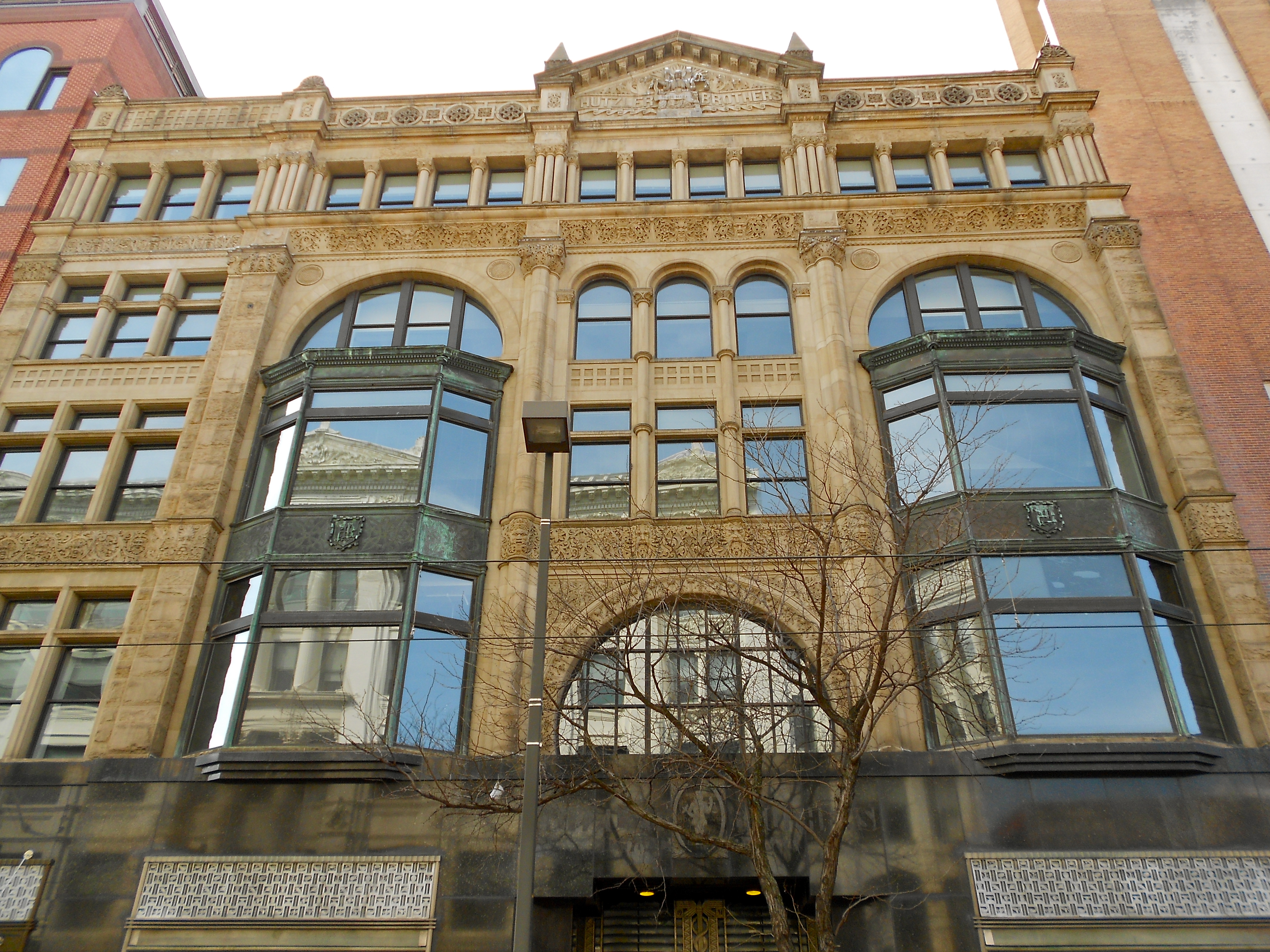
Hutzler Brothers Palace Building

Baldwin & Pennington was the architectural partnership with Ephraim Francis Baldwin (1837–1916) and Josias Pennington (1854–1929) based in Baltimore, Maryland. The firm designed an incredibly large number of prominent structures throughout the Middle Atlantic region, especially as the "house architects" of the Baltimore and Ohio Railroad, including many of its stations and other late 19th-century structures for the railroad. Several of their works are listed on the United States' National Register of Historic Places, maintained by the National Park Service of the U.S. Department of the Interior.

== Notable works ==
Works include (with attribution):

- Baltimore and Ohio Railroad Station, Oakland: Liberty Street, Oakland, Maryland, Garrett County, Maryland, (Baldwin & Pennington), NRHP-listed.
- Baltimore City College: 530 North Howard Street (at West Centre Street), Baltimore, Maryland, (Baldwin & Pennington), [second B.C.C. building on site, 1895], NRHP-listed.
- Baltimore County Courthouse (Annexes-north & south wings): Courthouse Square, Washington Avenue, between Pennsylvania and Chesapeake Avenues, Towson, Maryland, (Ephraim Francis Baldwin & Josias Pennington), NRHP-listed.
- Benson Building: 4 East Franklin Street, Baltimore, Maryland, (Baldwin & Pennington; Walters, Edward & Co.), NRHP-listed.
- One or more works in Davis and Elkins Historic District: Davis and Elkins College campus, Elkins, West Virginia, (Baldwin and Pennington), NRHP-listed.
- Fidelity Building (Baltimore) (1912-1915), northwest corner, North Charles and West Lexington Streets, Baltimore, Maryland, headquarters of Fidelity and Deposit Company of Baltimore, additional upper floors with terra-cotta façade to match original 1894 lower floors with grey rough-cut granite.
- Hutzler Brothers (department store) "Palace Building":, 210-218 North Howard Street, (between East Lexington and Saratoga Streets), Baltimore, Maryland, (Baldwin & Pennington), NRHP-listed.
- Maryland Club: 1 East Eager St., Baltimore, Maryland, (Josias Pennington, 1891), NRHP-listed.
- Merchants' National Bank Building (1895), Baltimore: 301 Water Street, Baltimore, Maryland, (Baldwin & Pennington), NRHP-listed.
- Mount Royal Station, (Baltimore and Ohio Railroad): 1400 Cathedral Street at Mount Royal Avenue, Baltimore, Maryland, (Josias Pennington), NRHP-listed.
- Pratt Street Power Plant: Pier 4, 601 East Pratt Street, Baltimore, Maryland, (Baldwin & Pennington), originally United Railways and Electric Company (streetcar system) - now Power Plant Live!, constructed 1899-1909 (built in 3 stages - interrupted by Great Baltimore Fire, February 7–8, 1904), NRHP-listed.

== See also ==
- Pennington Cottage
