= Benson Building =

Benson Building may refer to:

- Benson Building (Ottumwa, Iowa)
- Benson Building (Baltimore, Maryland)
