= Mountain Subdivision =

Railway line in Maryland and West Virginia

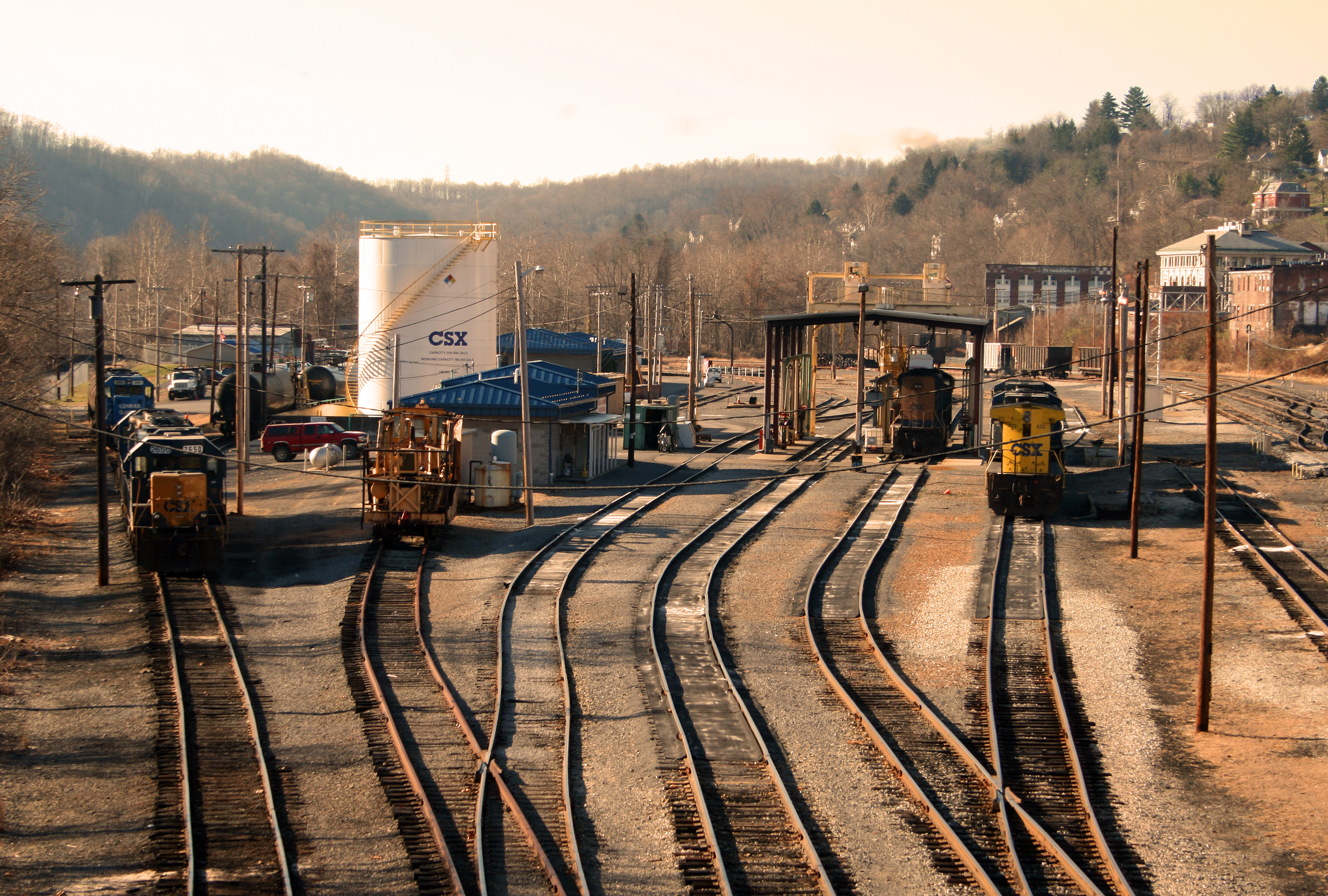
- The yard in Grafton in November, 2009.

Overview
- Status: Active
- Owner: CSX Transportation
- Locale: West Virginia, Maryland
- Termini: Grafton; Cumberland

Service
- Type: Freight rail
- System: CSX Transportation
- Operator(s): CSX Transportation

Technical
- Number of tracks: 2
- Track gauge: 4 ft 8 1/2 in (1,435 mm) standard gauge

The Mountain Subdivision is a railroad line owned and operated by CSX Transportation in the U.S. states of Maryland and West Virginia. The line runs from Cumberland, Maryland, west to Grafton, West Virginia, along the original Baltimore and Ohio Railroad (B&O) main line. It was known as the West End Subdivision until the B&O's absorption into the Chessie System, and included the B&O's original crossing of the Allegheny Mountains. Through CSX traffic to the west from Cumberland now uses the Keystone Subdivision over Sand Patch Grade.

At its east end, the Mountain Subdivision becomes the Cumberland Terminal Subdivision at Beall Street. It junctions the Thomas Subdivision twice – near Keyser, West Virginia, and near Piedmont, West Virginia – and meets the Fairmont Subdivision near its west end at Grafton. At its west end, it continues as the Bridgeport Subdivision. The Mountain Subdivision's summit is at Altamont, Maryland, at the west end of the Seventeen Mile Grade; the grade's east end is at Piedmont, West Virginia.

== History ==
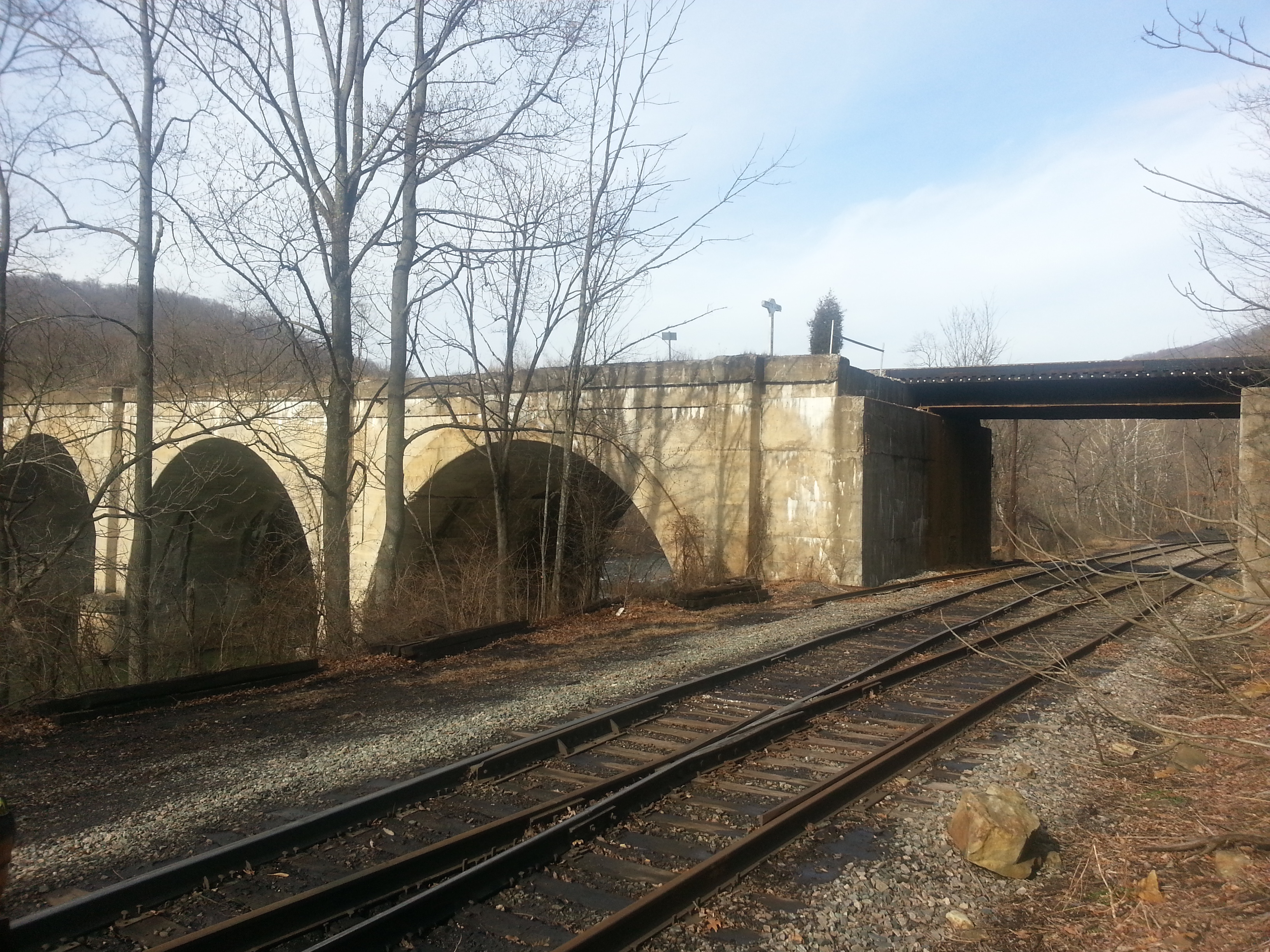
Bloomington Viaduct crossing the North Branch Potomac River

The Mountain Subdivision was opened in 1852 as part of the B&O's main line. In 1904 the B&O built the Patterson Creek Cutoff to alleviate congestion in its Cumberland rail yard. The cutoff line ran from McKenzie, Maryland to Patterson Creek, West Virginia, providing a bypass of the yard for coal trains moving between Keyser and Brunswick, Maryland.

During the 1970s ownership of the subdivision passed from the B&O to the Chessie System, which closed the Patterson Creek Cutoff. Chessie was merged into CSX in the early 1980s. The Western Maryland Thomas Subdivision was also connected to the Mountain Subdivision.

== See also ==
- Cumberland Subdivision - CSX
- Old Main Line Subdivision - CSX
