= Oakland station =

Oakland station most commonly refers to a public transit station representing Oakland, California:

- Oakland–Jack London Square station
- Oakland Coliseum station
- Oakland International Airport station

Oakland station may also refer to:

- Oakland station (Maryland)
- Oakland City station, Georgia

== See also ==
- Category:Railway stations in Oakland, California
- Oaklands railway station, South Australia
- Oaklands railway station, New South Wales, Australia
