= Deer Park Hotel =

Coordinates: 39°25′5.82″N 79°19′48.96″W

Deer Park Hotel - Main House - 1892

The Deer Park Hotel was a vacation resort in the Appalachian Mountains of Western Maryland, in the small town of Deer Park, Maryland. Constructed in 1873 on land owned by a former Baltimore and Ohio Railroad (B&O) employee and West Virginia Senator Henry Gassaway Davis, the hotel was heavily promoted by the B&O railroad as cool and breeze-filled during otherwise hot city summers and 8 hours by express train from Baltimore and 11 hours by express train from Cincinnati, Ohio. It became a favorite resort for wealthy and prominent citizens of the Baltimore/Washington area. Presidents Ulysses S. Grant, Benjamin Harrison, and Grover Cleveland were among its guests; William McKinley visited the establishment before he became president. Even President Grover Cleveland spent his five-day honeymoon with his new wife, Frances Folsom Cleveland. The Deer Park Spring, which had produced pure mountain water that was sold commercially, supplied the hotel, its swimming pool, and Victorian Turkish baths. Deer Park's popularity declined after 1900, and the resort finally closed after the Depression began in 1929. The grand hotel itself was razed in 1944 due to a fire, although a few of the opulent cottages remain.

During the boom years, East Coast railroads were finding that a lucrative passenger business could be built up by transporting people from a city to railroad-owned hotels in the mountains, including nearby in Oakland, Maryland. Thus, B&O Railroad ventured into the "resort hotel" business in 1869, when it purchased several 100 acres (400,000 m^{2}) of the Perry family's "Anchorage Farm." In 1872, the railroad constructed the central section of the Deer Park Hotel, which opened for the first time on July 4, 1873. The east and west wings of the hotel were added in 1881-82, bringing the total number of rooms to 300. (According to tradition, "The Anchorage" house stood beside the present Pysell Crosscut Road; the location is marked by two sailing ship anchors on the lawn of a house that is there now.)

During the early 1870s, H. G. Davis contracted to build a series of cottages on the hotel property, with the first one becoming John W. Garrett's cottage. Later, this became the caretaker's cottage, and Garrett had a more sumptuous summer home built on the west side of the hotel; he died there in the summer of 1884.

The Deer Park Hotel was one of five Combination Station-Hotels built by the B&O during the 1870s, including the Queen City Hotel in Cumberland, Maryland.
