= Hutzler Brothers Palace Building =

Historic place in Maryland, United States

- U.S. National Register of Historic Places
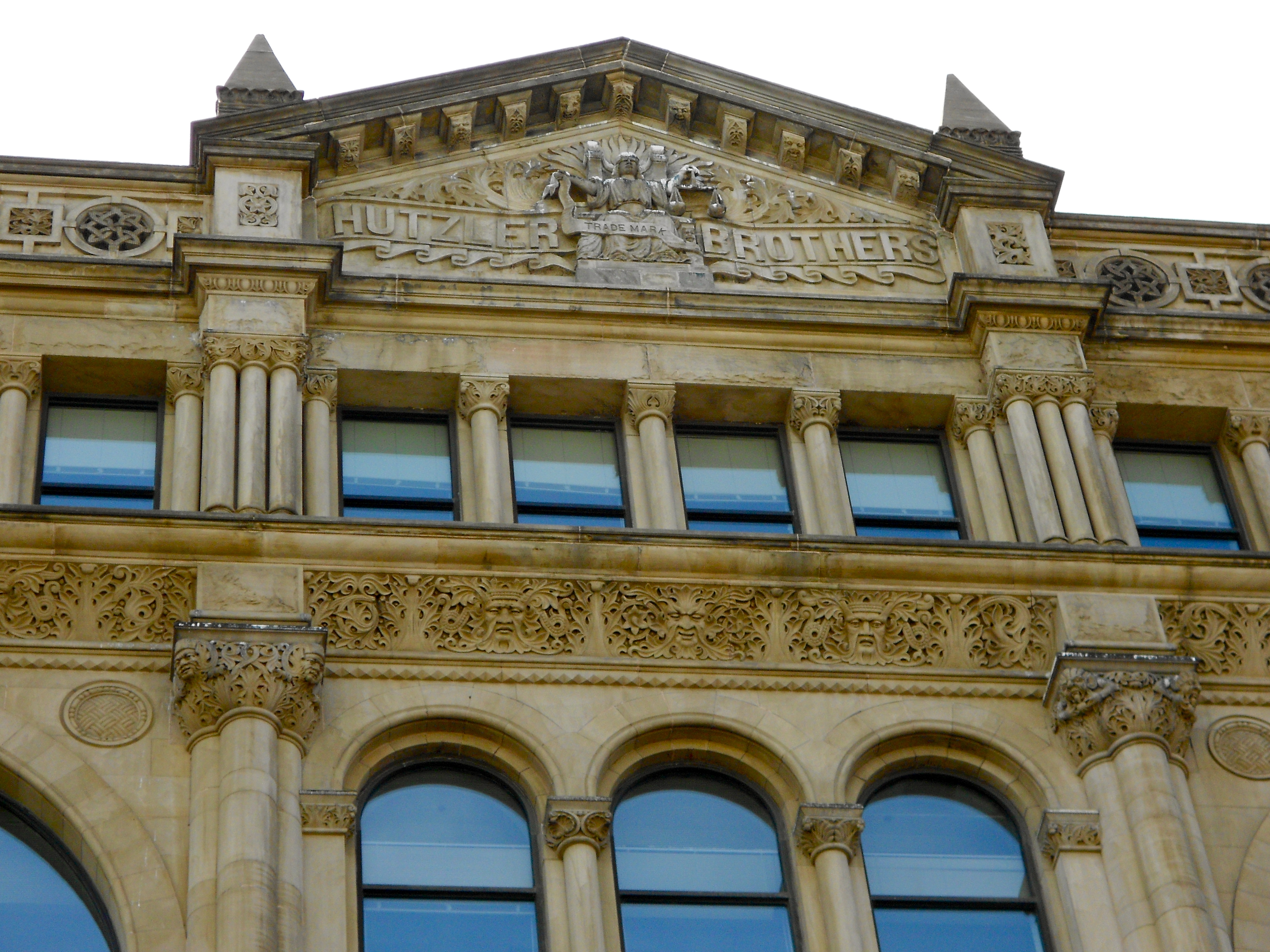
- Hutzler Brothers Palace Building, March 2012

- Location within Baltimore Location within Maryland Location within the United States
- Location: 210-218 N. Howard St., Baltimore, Maryland
- Coordinates: 39°17′31.5″N 76°37′11.5″W
- Area: 0.2 acres (0.081 ha)
- Built: 1888
- Architects: Baldwin & Pennington; Edmunds, James R.
- Architectural style: Second Empire, Modern Movement
- NRHP reference No.: 84001348
- Added to NRHP: June 7, 1984

The Hutzler Brothers Palace Building is a historic flagship department store building located at Baltimore, Maryland, United States and built by Hutzler's. It was constructed in 1888, with a south bay added in 1924.

The original limestone Romanesque eclectic façade is three bays wide and five stories in height. The ground floor façade was redesigned in 1931 in the Art Moderne style. Hutzler's is believed to hold the record for longevity in an original location among American department stores, having been founded on this site in 1858.

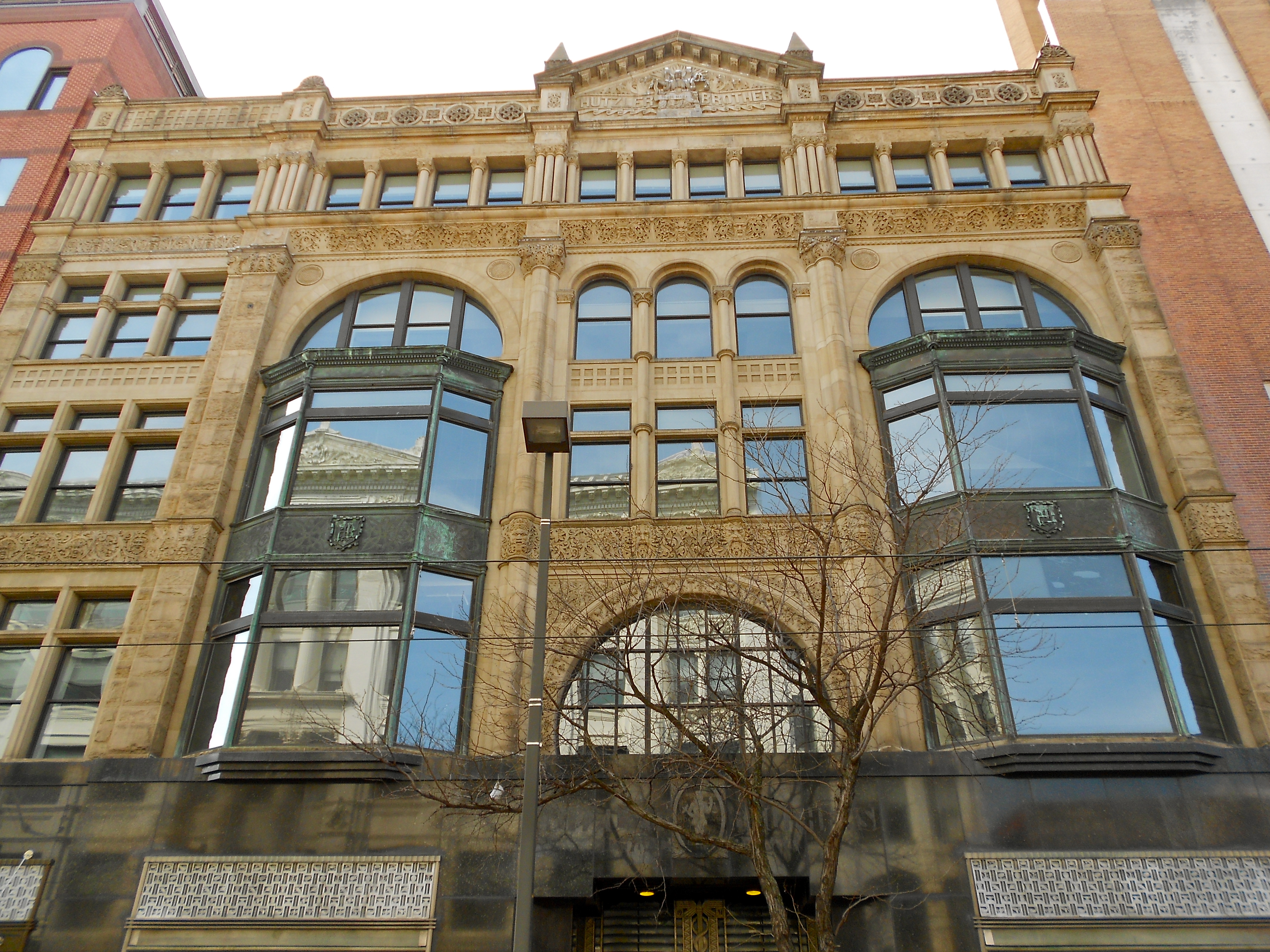
Hutzler Bros. building in Baltimore

Hutzler Brothers Palace Building was listed on the National Register of Historic Places in 1984.
