= Pennington Cottage =

Historic house in Maryland, United States

- U.S. National Register of Historic Places
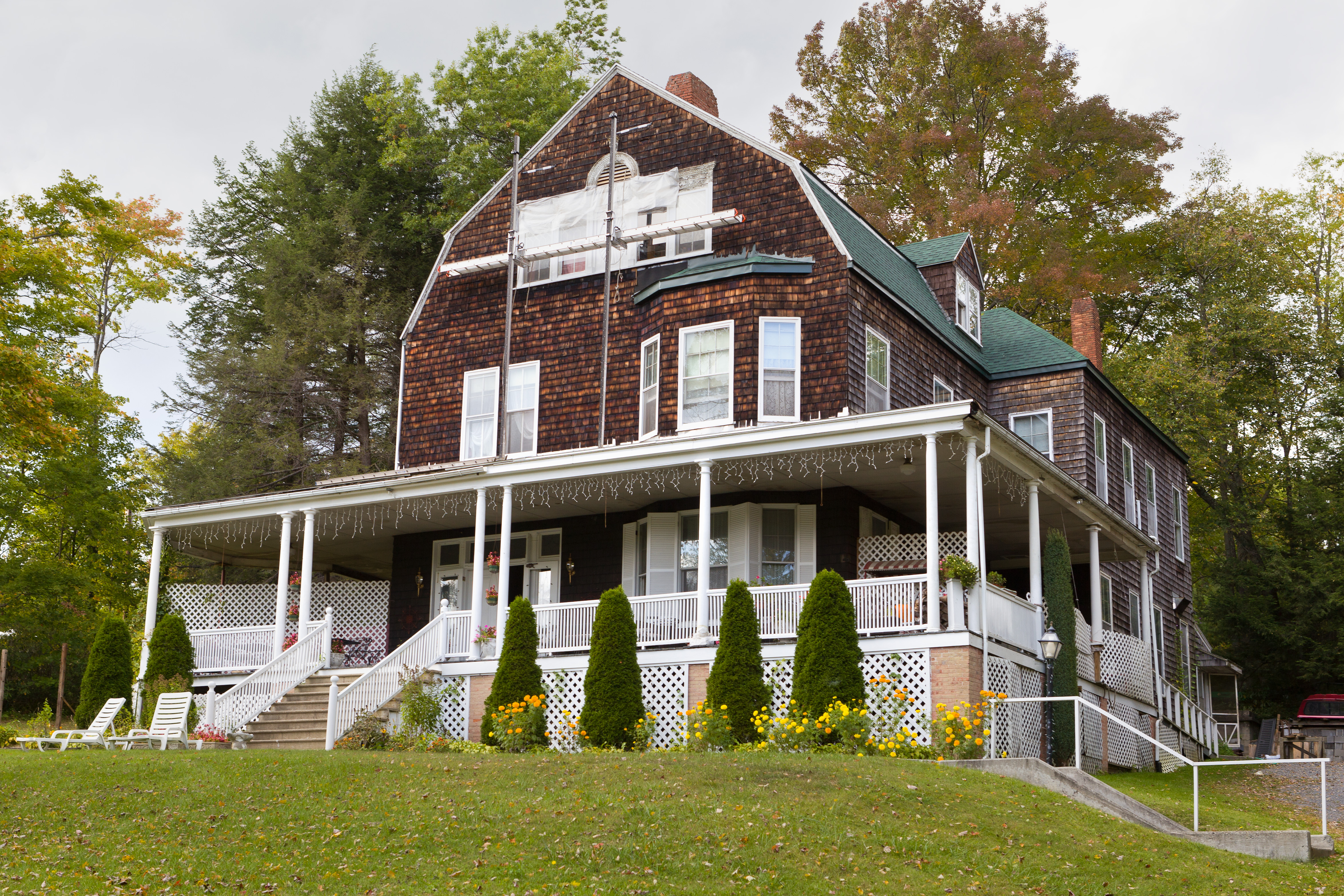

- Location within Maryland Location within the United States
- Location: Deer Park Hotel Rd., Deer Park, Maryland
- Coordinates: 39°25′12″N 79°20′0″W
- Area: less than one acre
- Architectural style: Shingle Style
- NRHP reference No.: 76000997
- Added to NRHP: May 17, 1976

The Pennington Cottage is a historic home located at Deer Park, Garrett County, Maryland, United States. It is a 2 1/2-story, late-19th-century Shingle-Style frame structure, with a gambrel roof and a one-story porch that stretches across the principal facade and along portions of the sides. The house is entirely covered with dark wood shingles. It was built as a part of the Baltimore and Ohio Railroad's Deer Park Hotel complex, as the summer home of Baltimore architect Josias Pennington (d. 1929).

Pennington Cottage was listed on the National Register of Historic Places in 1976, and then was "by far the best preserved of the [hotel] complex" structures It is currently used as a bed-and-breakfast inn.
