= Merchants' National Bank Building (Baltimore, 1895) =

- Merchants National Bank Building
- U.S. Historic district – Contributing property
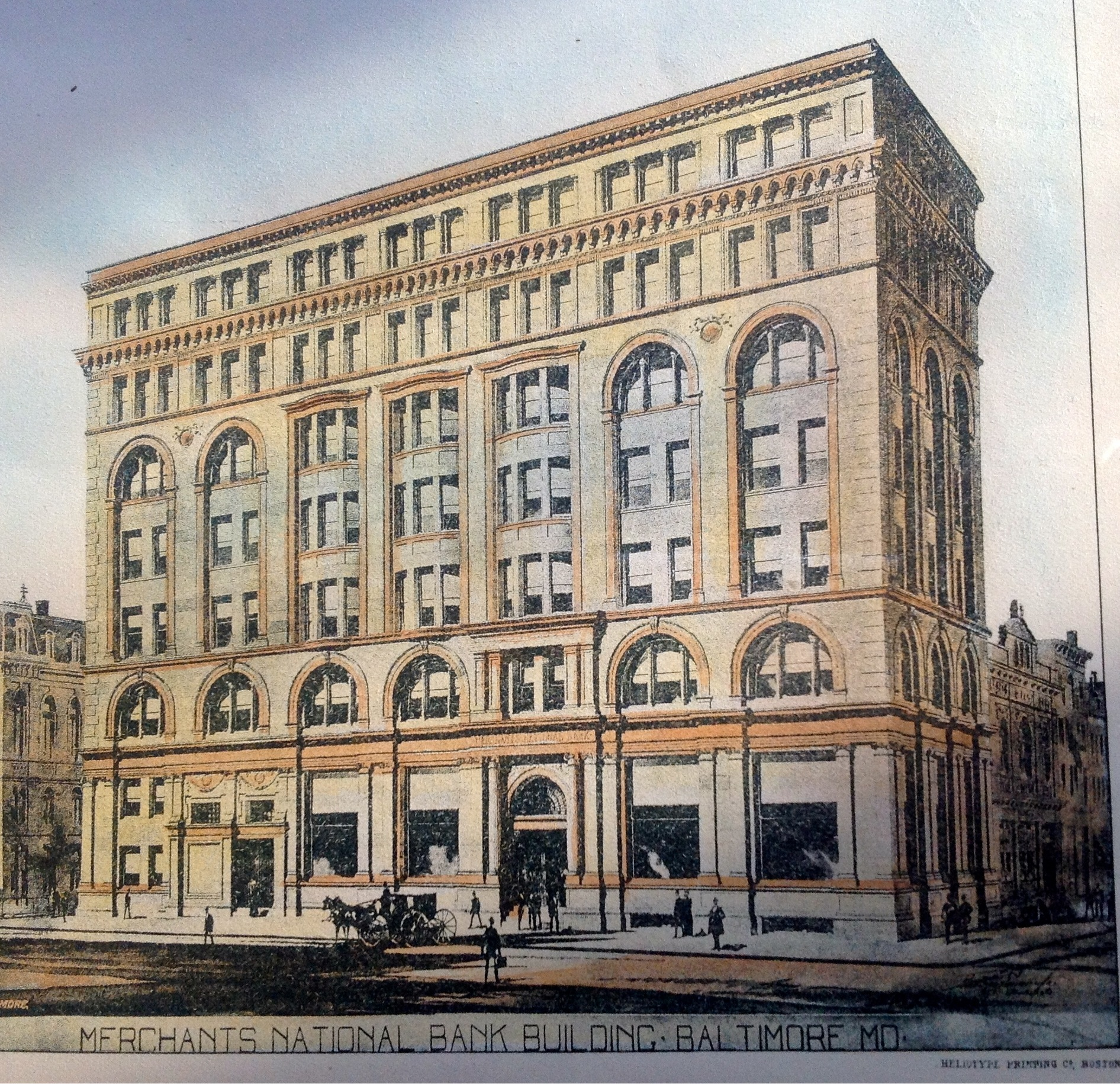
- The Merchants' National Bank Building (1895), as pictured in the American Architect and Building News, Nov. 13,1893. No. 934.

- Location within Maryland Location within Baltimore
- Location: 301 Water St., Baltimore, Maryland
- Coordinates: 39°17′19″N 76°36′38″W
- Architect: Baldwin & Pennington
- Architectural style: Renaissance Revival
- Part of: Business and Government Historic District (ID87002065)
- Added to NRHP: 1987

The Merchants' National Bank Building is a historic bank building at 301 Water Street, at the corner of South Street, in Baltimore, Maryland. It was a 7-story, Renaissance Revival style building designed by the Baltimore-based architectural firm of Baldwin & Pennington, and constructed in 1893-1895. Johns Hopkins, a Baltimore businessman, abolitionist, and philanthropist, had been president of the bank from 1853 until his death in 1873.

== Architecture and ownership history ==
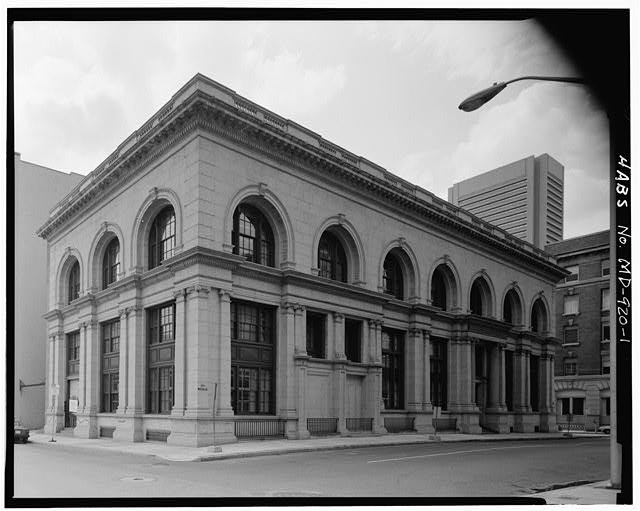
Merchants Bank Building after being destroyed by the Great Baltimore Fire of 1904 and reduced to two stories. Picture circa 1950s.

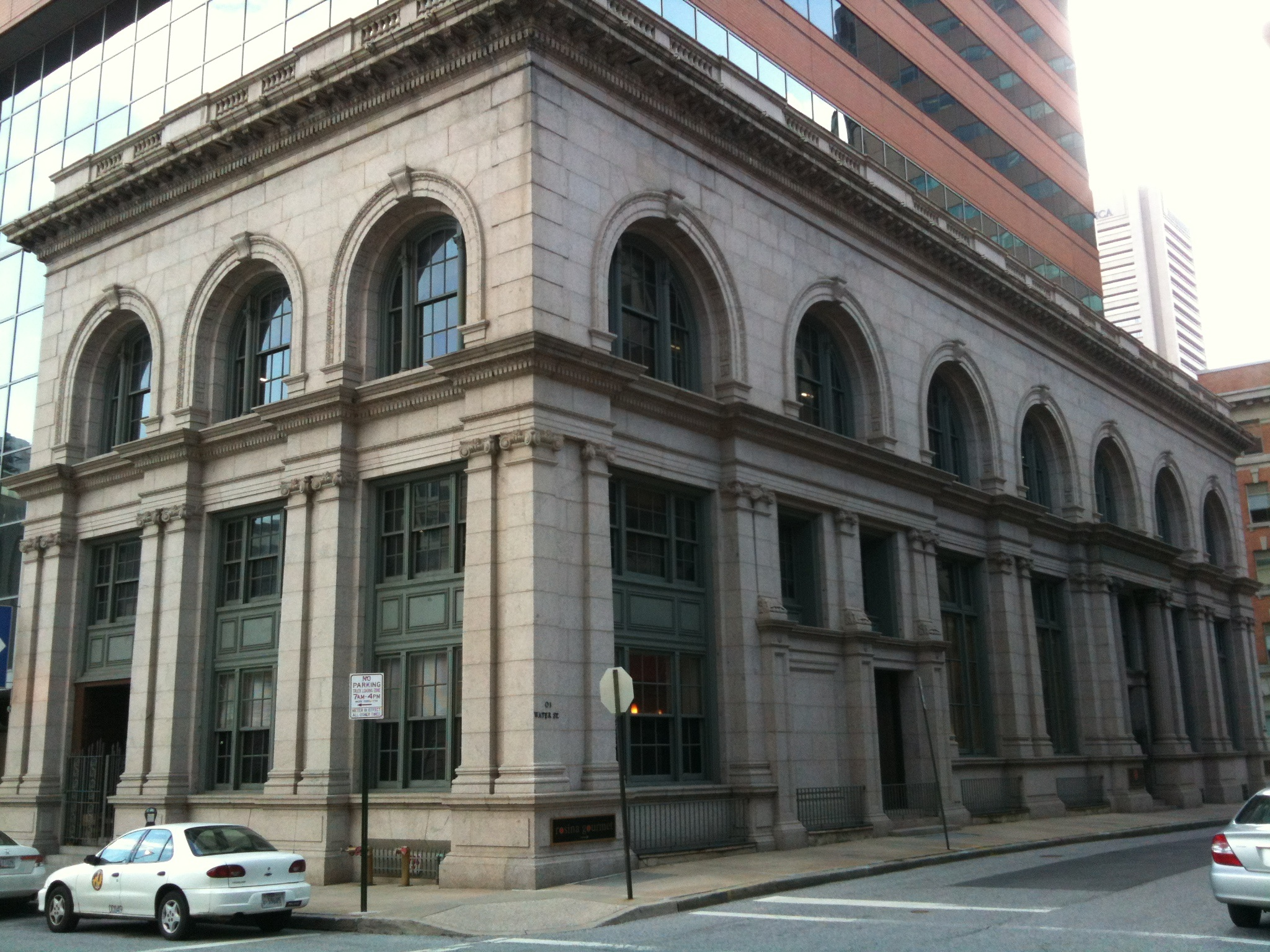
Merchants Bank Building, Baltimore 2014, after a new postmodern skyscraper was built in the 1980s.

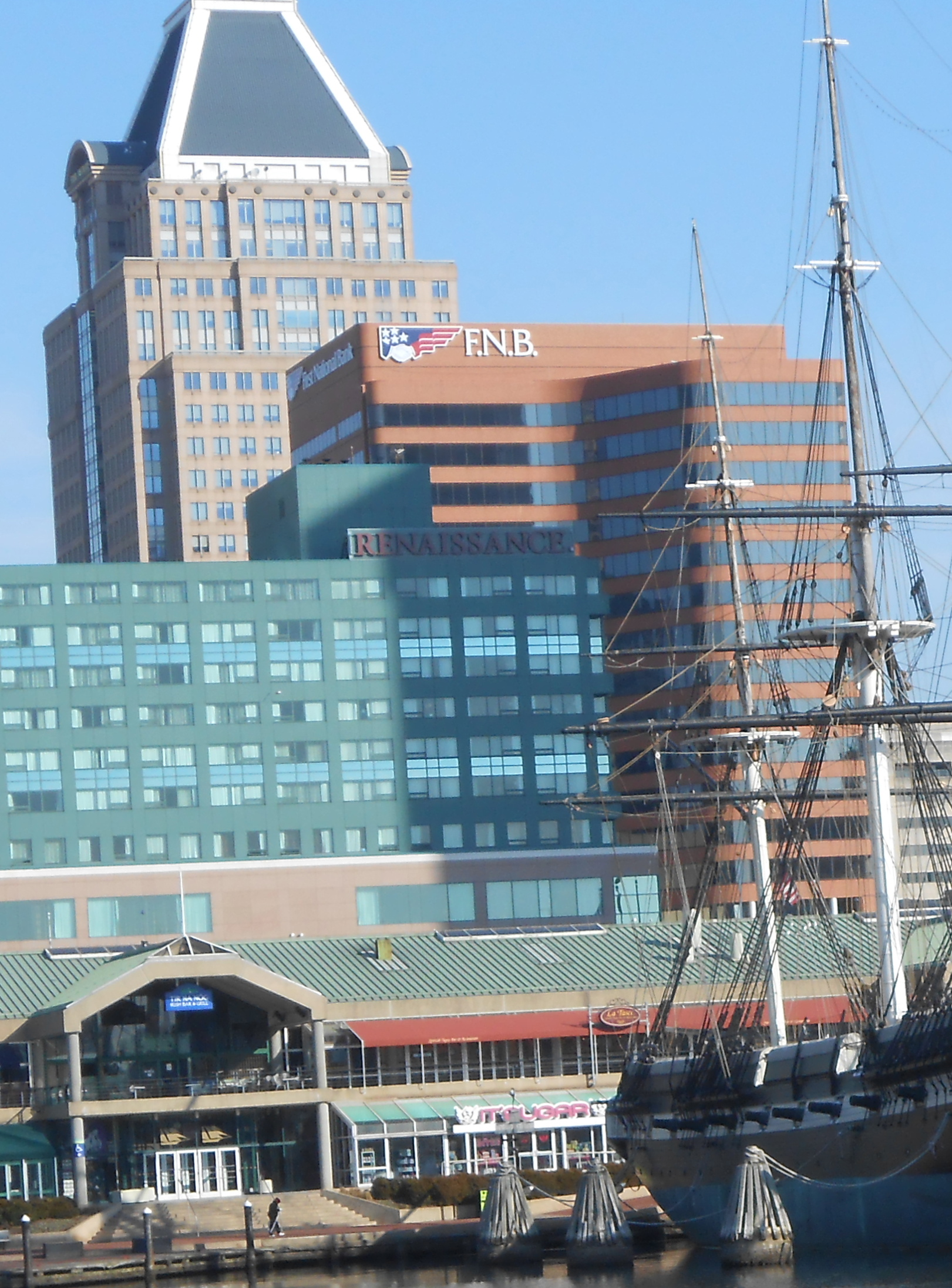
Tall red brick building with FNB—First National Bank sign was formerly the Merchants Natl. Bank Bldg. Behind is Commerce Place. In front is the USS Constellation and Harborplace Mall.

When the 7 story Merchants National Bank Building was completed in 1895 the Baltimore sun called it "a splendid building" and a fine addition to the many recent handsome office buildings erected in Baltimore. Optimistically, the Sun article also mentioned that the steel frame encased in brick masonry with granite facing on the outside made the structure "fire-proof throughout".

It burnt down 9 years later, a victim of the Great Baltimore Fire of 1904. Almost the entire interior was destroyed, except for the banking rooms on the first floor. The bank then decided to make its headquarters a two-story building, which it remained for almost 80 years.

Merchants consolidated with the Mechanics NB of Baltimore in 1912 and consolidated at the Mechanics' location. This property was then surplused and sold to Baltimore insurance company USF&G, which kept it till the 1970s. Baltimore Federal Savings & Loan bought the property in 1977, and in 1982 erected a new 17 story Postmodern style building, spanning the entire block between Water and East Lombard, South and Commerce Streets. The original two story building was preserved as a historic facade. The construction cost was approximately $20 million. The architect was Donald N. Coupard Associates (now DNC Architects), and Whiting-Turner was the general contractor.

=== Landmark ===
The 1895 Merchants' National Bank Building facade is a historic district contributing property, within the Baltimore Business and Government Historic District, which was listed on the National Register of Historic Places in 1987.
