= Patterson Creek Cutoff =

Abandoned railway line in the United States

The Patterson Creek Cutoff is an abandoned railroad line built by the Baltimore and Ohio Railroad (B&O) in northern West Virginia and Western Maryland, that served trains running on the B&O "West End" line in the Cumberland, Maryland area. The cutoff route ran from McKenzie, Maryland to Patterson Creek, West Virginia, providing a bypass of the B&O rail yard in Cumberland for coal trains moving between Keyser, West Virginia and Brunswick, Maryland.

The B&O opened the double track line in 1904, and it included the Knobley Tunnel and a bridge, both of which are still in existence. Knobley Tunnel passes through Knobly Mountain and is slightly less than 1 mile (1.6 km) in length. The cutoff was later reduced to single track, and ultimately abandoned in the early 1970s by the Chessie System, successor to the B&O. The rails have been removed from the bridge structure, and a few railroad ties are in an advanced state of decomposition. The line's right-of-way can still be easily distinguished, especially in McKenzie, where there is a large cut and fill.

CSX Transportation, the successor to the Chessie System, continues to operate the main rail line in the McKenzie area as the Mountain Subdivision, and the Cumberland Subdivision in the Patterson Creek area.
