= Garrett County Courthouse =

- U.S. National Register of Historic Places
- U.S. Historic district – Contributing property
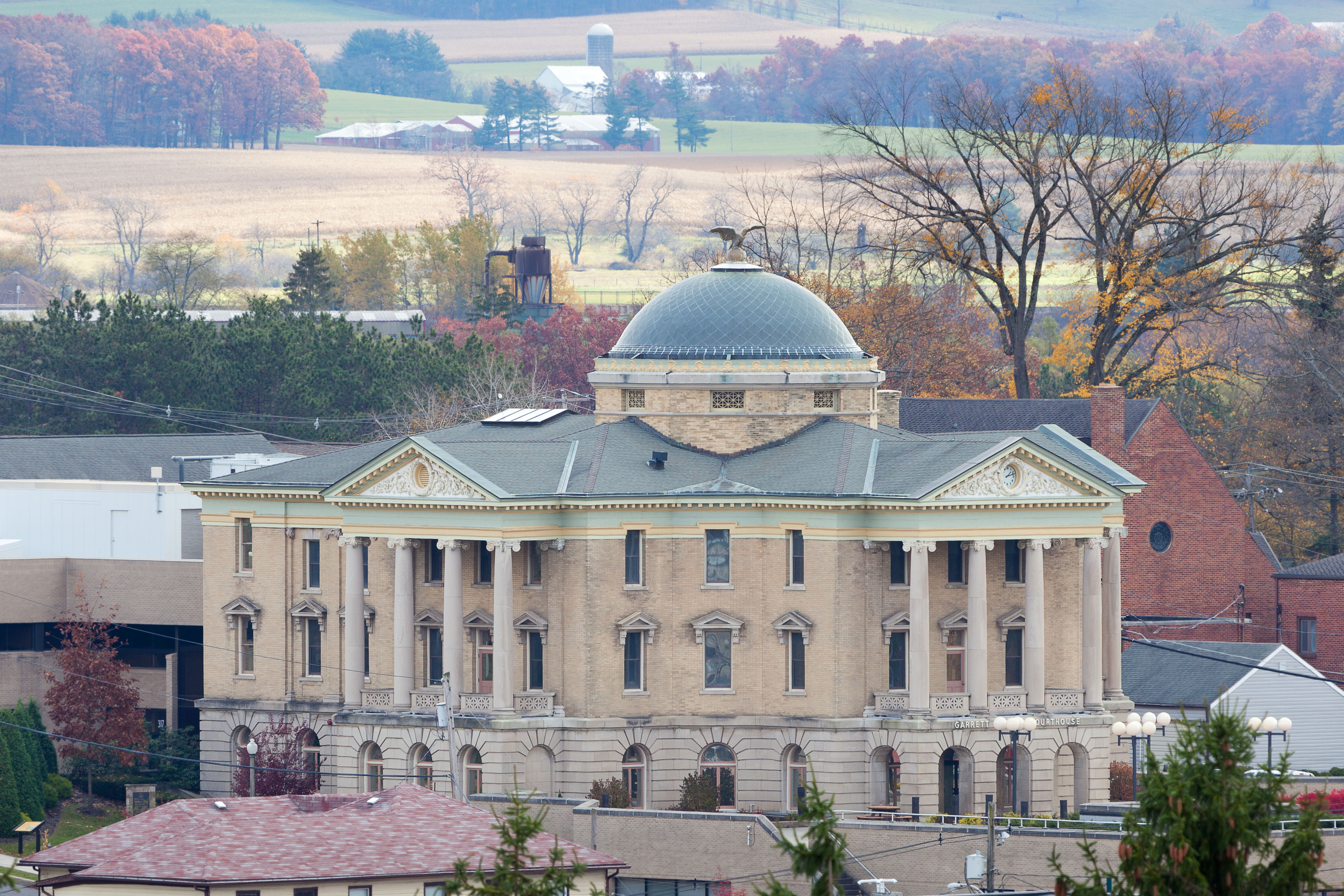
- Garrett County Courthouse in 2012

- Location within Maryland Location within the United States
- Location: 3rd and Alder Sts., Oakland, Maryland
- Coordinates: 39°24′26″N 79°24′25″W
- Built: 1907
- Architect: James Riely Gordon of Tracy & Swartout
- Architectural style: Classical Revival
- Part of: Oakland Historic District (ID84001798)
- NRHP reference No.: 75000899
- Added to NRHP: November 12, 1975

The Garrett County Courthouse is a historic county courthouse located at Oakland, Garrett County, Maryland, United States. It is a three-story, 1907–1908 neo-classical Renaissance Revival masonry structure in the form of a Latin Cross with a central rotunda and dome. The Courthouse was designed by James Riely Gordon (1863–1937), a New York architect who specialized in designing government buildings.

The Garrett County Courthouse was listed on the National Register of Historic Places in 1975.
