= McKenzie, Maryland =

Unincorporated community in Maryland, United States

- Unincorporated community
- Location within the State of Maryland McKenzie, Maryland (the United States)
- Coordinates: 39°34′02″N 78°49′26″W
- Country: United States
- State: Maryland
- County: Allegany
- Elevation: 679 ft (207 m)
- Time zone: UTC-5 (Eastern (EST))
  - Summer (DST): UTC-4 (EDT)
- GNIS feature ID: 590778

McKenzie is an unincorporated community in Allegany County, Maryland, United States.

Its name is derived from a family which owned a large farm along the river bottom in the area. It is located directly across from the Allegany Ballistics Laboratory in Rocket Center, West Virginia. The area was formerly a railroad junction of the Patterson Creek Cutoff and the main B&O line. McKenzie is also the site of one of the first settlements in Allegany County. In the fields of the river bottom, arrowheads and flint can be found, suggesting a possible Native American community at one time, similar to the Barton, Maryland site.
