= Borderside =

Destroyed historic house in Maryland, US

- U.S. National Register of Historic Places
- Location within Maryland Location within the United States
- Location: Oakland--Westernport Rd., Bloomington, Maryland
- Coordinates: 39°28′37.2″N 79°4′24.2″W
- Area: 4.8 acres (1.9 ha)
- Built: 1870
- Architectural style: Italianate
- NRHP reference No.: 75000898
- Added to NRHP: October 29, 1975

Borderside, also known as Brydon Mansion, was a historic home located at Bloomington, Garrett County, Maryland, United States. It was a 2 1/2-story, with 3-story tower, Italianate-style brick structure that burned in the mid- to late 1970s. The tower had a pronounced bell-curve Mansard roof. It was built in 1870 for William A. Brydon, a coal and lumber dealer and member of the Maryland House of Delegates in 1867.

Borderside was listed on the National Register of Historic Places in 1975.
