= Deer Park, Maryland =

- Town
- Location of Deer Park, Maryland
- Coordinates: 39°25′26″N 79°19′34″W
- Country: United States
- State: Maryland
- County: Garrett
- Incorporated: 1884

Government
  - Mayor: Donald Dawson

Area
  - Total: 1.00 sq mi (2.59 km^{2})
  - Land: 1.00 sq mi (2.59 km^{2})
  - Water: 0 sq mi (0.00 km^{2})
- Elevation: 2,520 ft (770 m)

Population (2020)
  - Total: 303
  - Density: 303.3/sq mi (117.11/km^{2})
- Time zone: UTC-5 (Eastern (EST))
  - Summer (DST): UTC-4 (EDT)
- ZIP code: 21550
- Area codes: 301, 240
- FIPS code: 24-22275
- GNIS feature ID: 2390824

Deer Park is a town in Garrett County, Maryland, United States. As of the 2020 census, Deer Park had a population of 303. It is part of the Pittsburgh Media Market.

== Geography ==
According to the United States Census Bureau, the town has a total area of 1.00 square mile (2.59 km^{2}), all land.

== History ==
The town of Deer Park traces its history back to the 1770s, long before Garrett County was established. The town was part of property owned by Lord Baltimore and was originally surveyed on April 14, 1774. Deer Park saw immense growth during the mid to late 1880s, primarily because of the Baltimore and Ohio Railroad. The Deer Park Hotel, constructed in 1872, served as the focal point for visitors who came to the mountaintop to enjoy the area's scenery and cool temperatures during the summer months. Numerous large cottages were subsequently erected and made available to wealthy visitors.

President and Mrs. Grover Cleveland spent the first night of their honeymoon in Deer Park, June 3, 1886.

As automobiles became more readily available in the early 1900s, transportation was no longer limited to railroad service, and Deer Park lost its appeal as a vacation destination. The fortunes of the town gradually declined. Fires and demolitions have destroyed many of the fine homes and hotels that once were abundant in the area.

Pennington Cottage was listed on the National Register of Historic Places in 1976. Glamorgan was listed in 1984.

== Demographics ==
Historical population
Census	Pop.	Note	%±
1880	195		—
1890	179		−8.2%
1900	293		63.7%
1910	268		−8.5%
1920	247		−7.8%
1930	249		0.8%
1940	329		32.1%
1950	320		−2.7%
1960	379		18.4%
1970	306		−19.3%
1980	486		58.8%
1990	419		−13.8%
2000	405		−3.3%
2010	399		−1.5%
2020	303		−24.1%
U.S. Decennial Census

=== 2010 census ===
As of the census of 2010, there were 399 people, 156 households, and 112 families living in the town. The population density was 399.0 inhabitants per square mile (154.1/km^{2}). There were 175 housing units at an average density of 175.0 per square mile (67.6/km^{2}). The racial makeup of the town was 99.5% White and 0.5% African American. Hispanic or Latino of any race were 0.3% of the population.

There were 156 households, of which 41.0% had children under the age of 18 living with them, 51.9% were married couples living together, 15.4% had a female householder with no husband present, 4.5% had a male householder with no wife present, and 28.2% were non-families. 23.7% of all households were made up of individuals, and 10.3% had someone living alone who was 65 years of age or older. The average household size was 2.56, and the average family size was 2.99.

The median age in the town was 34.9 years. 29.6% of residents were under the age of 18; 6.7% were between the ages of 18 and 24; 27.1% were from 25 to 44; 23.8% were from 45 to 64; and 12.8% were 65 years of age or older. The gender makeup of the town was 47.9% male and 52.1% female.

=== 2000 census ===
As of the census of 2000, there were 405 people, 161 households, and 112 families living in the town. The population density was 405.7 inhabitants per square mile (156.6/km^{2}). There were 181 housing units at an average density of 181.3 per square mile (70.0/km^{2}). The racial makeup of the town was 97.53% White, and 2.47% from two or more races.

There were 161 households, out of which 30.4% had children under the age of 18 living with them, 49.7% were married couples living together, 14.9% had a female householder with no husband present, and 30.4% were non-families. 26.1% of all households were made up of individuals, and 7.5% had someone living alone who was 65 years of age or older. The average household size was 2.52, and the average family size was 3.04.

In the town, the population was spread out, with 26.2% under the age of 18, 9.4% from 18 to 24, 29.9% from 25 to 44, 21.2% from 45 to 64, and 13.3% who were 65 years of age or older. The median age was 35 years. For every 100 females, there were 97.6 males. For every 100 females age 18 and over, there were 94.2 males.

The median household income in the town was $26,339, and the median family income was $30,000. Males had a median income of $26,875 versus $16,667 for females. The per capita income for the town was $11,302. About 21.2% of families and 24.6% of the population were below the poverty line, including 40.2% of those under age 18 and 18.8% of those age 65 or over.

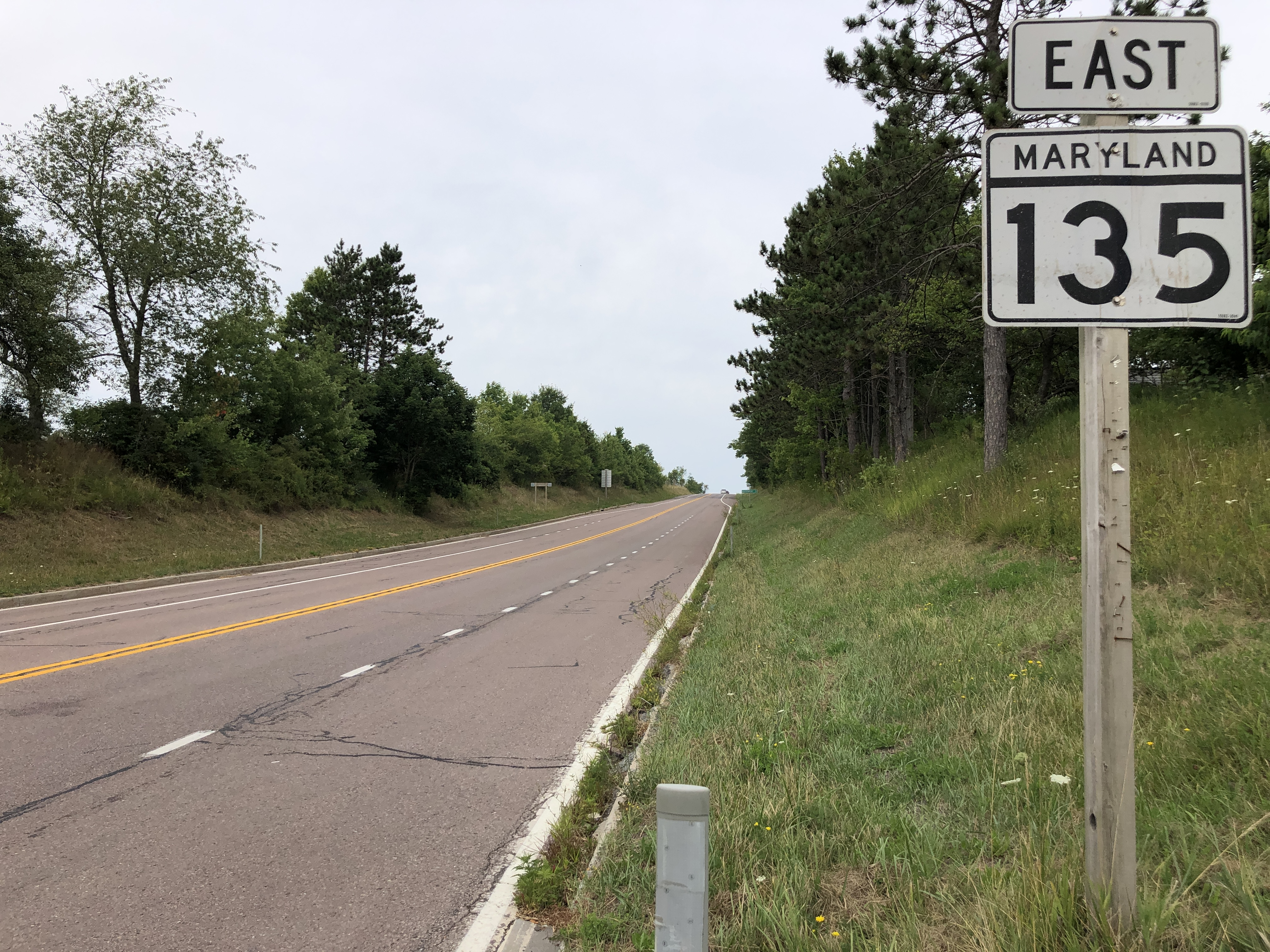
MD 135 eastbound at Main Street in Deer Park

== Transportation ==
The primary method of transportation to and from Deer Park presently is by road. The only state highway serving Deer Park is Maryland Route 135. MD 135 runs east-west across southern Garrett County, connecting with Maryland Route 495 to the east and Maryland Route 560 and U.S. Route 219 to the west. MD 135 itself provides access to the towns of Mountain Lake Park and Oakland to the west and to Luke and Westernport to the east. Via MD 495, the town of Grantsville is accessible, while MD 560 provides access to Loch Lynn Heights.
