= Mercy Chapel at Mill Run =

Historic church in Maryland, United States

- U.S. National Register of Historic Places
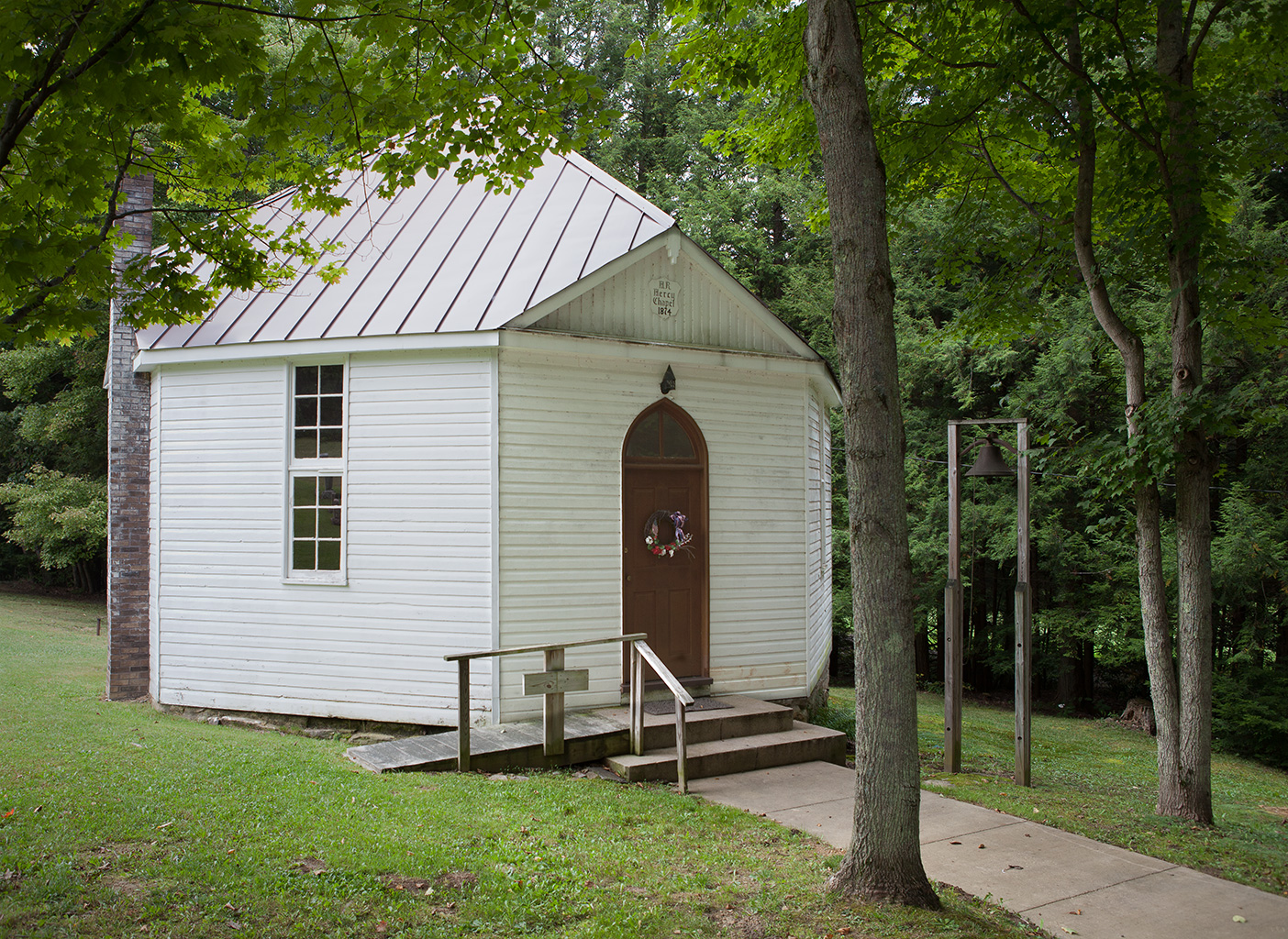
- Mercy Chapel at Mill Run

- Location within Maryland Location within the United States
- Location: Mill Run Rd., Selbysport, Maryland
- Coordinates: 39°42′40.27″N 79°22′19.22″W
- Area: 1.8 acres (0.73 ha)
- Built: 1874
- Architect: Miller, John
- Architectural style: Octagon Mode
- NRHP reference No.: 84001792
- Added to NRHP: September 7, 1984

Mercy Chapel at Mill Run is an historic Carpenter Gothic-style church located at Selbysport, Garrett County, Maryland. It is a one-story, one room frame structure built on an octagonal plan above a coursed stone foundation. The interior of the chapel is a fine example of local craftsmanship and is virtually unchanged since the 1870s. Two small graveyard plots lie adjacent to the chapel. It is one of the most architecturally sophisticated and well-preserved octagonal buildings in Maryland, and one of only a dozen mid-19th-century octagonal buildings surviving in Maryland.

It was listed on the National Register of Historic Places in 1984.
