= Bloomington, Maryland =

- Census-designated place
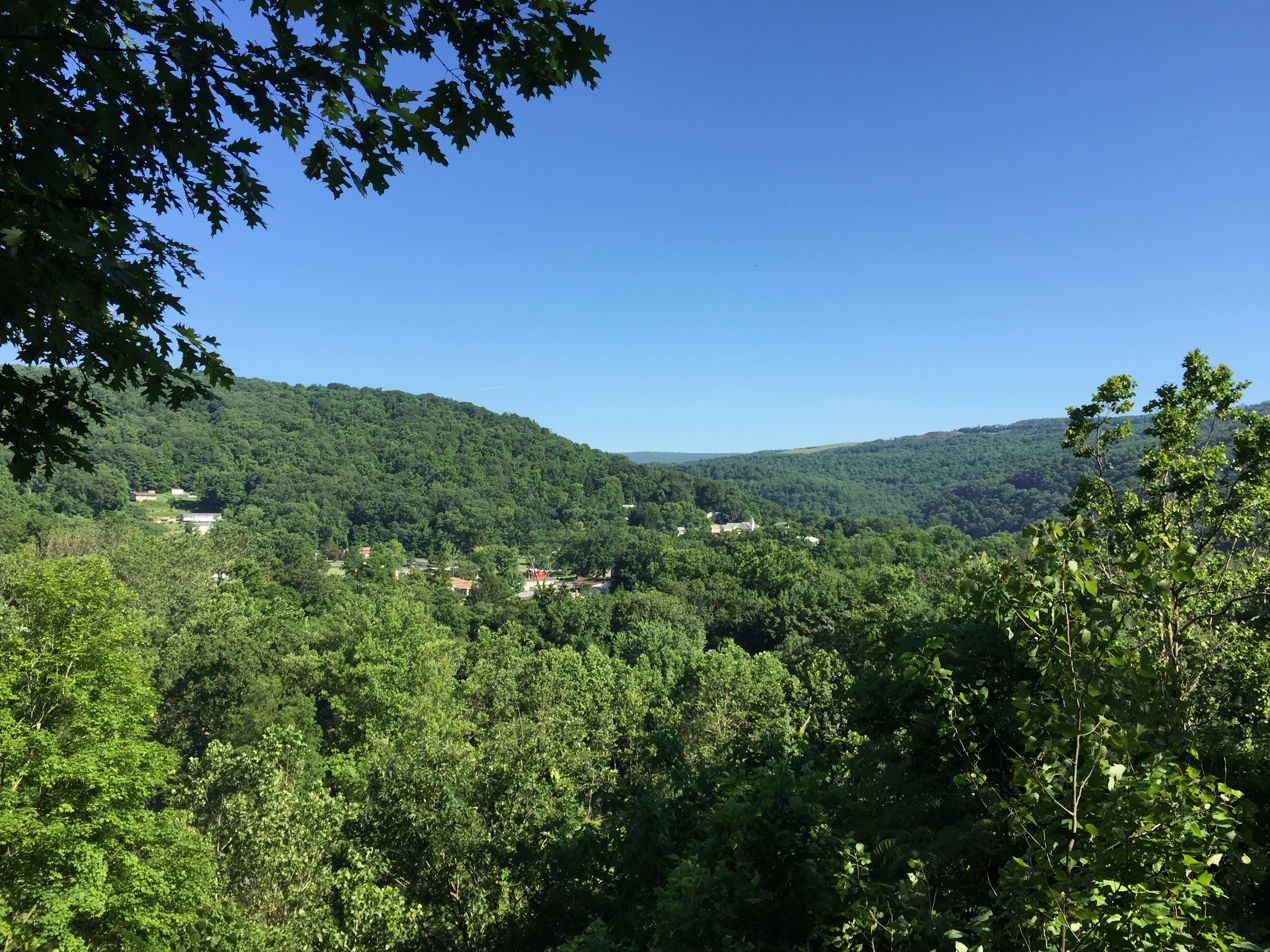
- View of Bloomington from West Virginia Route 46 across the North Branch Potomac River in Mineral County, West Virginia

- Location within Maryland Location within the United States
- Coordinates: 39°28′46″N 79°04′37″W
- Country: United States
- State: Maryland
- County: Garrett

Area
  - Total: 0.64 sq mi (1.67 km^{2})
  - Land: 0.62 sq mi (1.61 km^{2})
  - Water: 0.023 sq mi (0.06 km^{2})
- Elevation: 1,316 ft (401 m)

Population (2020)
  - Total: 271
  - Density: 437.0/sq mi (168.72/km^{2})
- Time zone: UTC−5 (Eastern (EST))
  - Summer (DST): UTC−4 (EDT)
- ZIP code: 21523
- Area codes: 301, 240
- FIPS code: 24-08050
- GNIS feature ID: 2583586

Bloomington is an unincorporated community and census-designated place (CDP) located in southeastern Garrett County, Maryland located at the confluence of the North Branch Potomac River and Savage River. It lies to the west of Luke on Maryland Route 135 and is bounded to the northwest by Savage River State Forest. As of the 2010 census the population of Bloomington was 305.

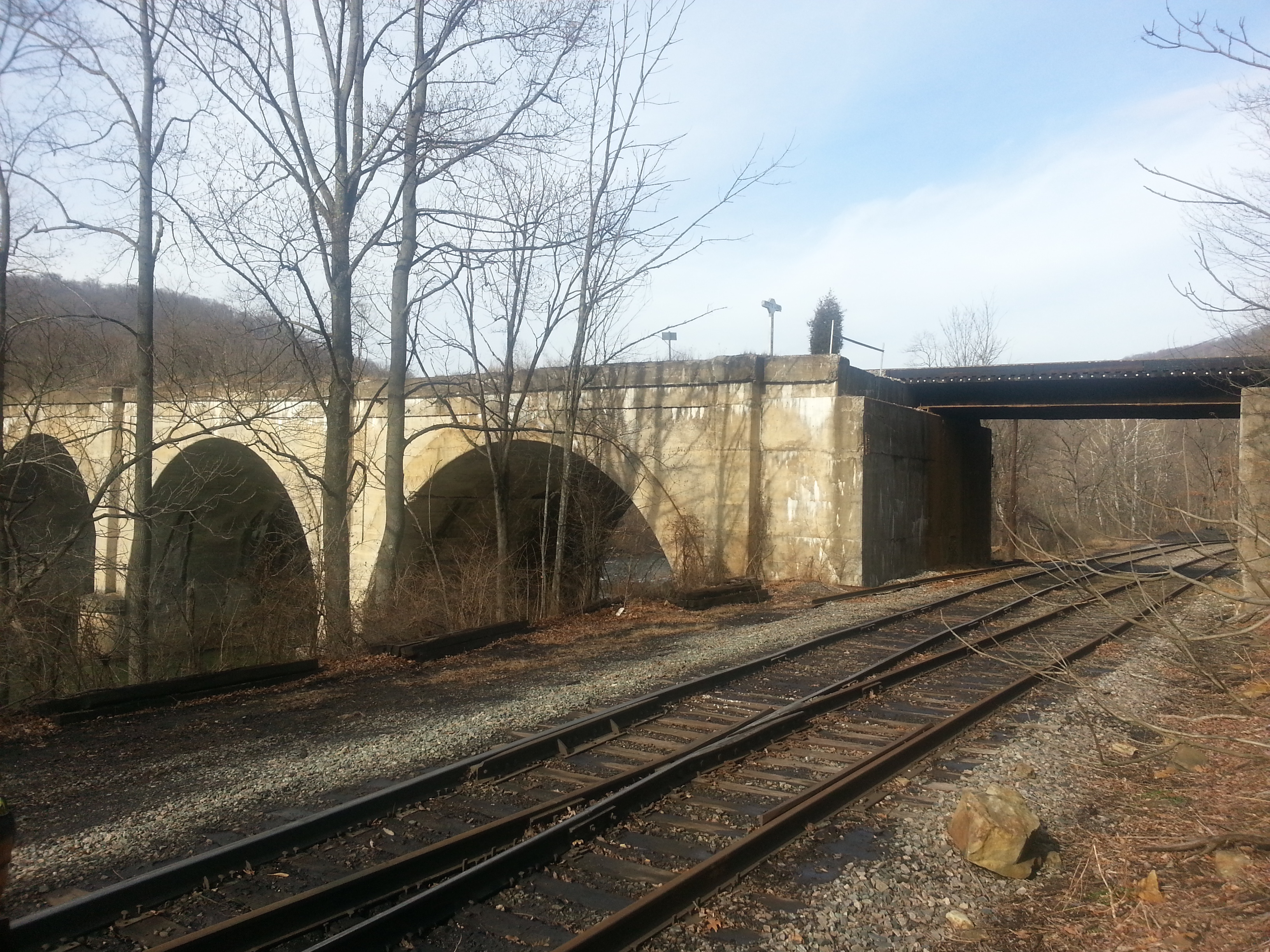
Bloomington Viaduct in January 2014

Originally known as "Llangollen" when the town's post office was established on December 4, 1872, its name was later changed to "Bloomington". Jennings Randolph Lake to the southwest on the North Branch of the Potomac was completed in 1982 as "Bloomington Lake" but was renamed in 1987 by the United States Congress for West Virginia Senator Jennings Randolph.

Borderside, a historic home, was listed on the National Register of Historic Places in 1975. The Bloomington Viaduct was listed in 1976.

A proposal has been filed with the Federal Energy Regulatory Commission by Fairlawn Hydroelectric Company to construct a 10.5 MW hydroelectric facility at the Army Corps of Engineers-operated dam for the lake. Approvals were still pending in 2016.

== Demographics ==
Historical population
Census	Pop.	Note	%±
2020	271		—
U.S. Decennial Census

== Climate ==
The climate in this area has mild differences between highs and lows, and there is adequate rainfall year-round. According to the Köppen Climate Classification system, Bloomington has a marine west coast climate, abbreviated "Cfb" on climate maps.
