= Hoye Site =

- U.S. National Register of Historic Places
- Nearest city: Oakland, Maryland
- NRHP reference No.: 75000900
- Added to NRHP: May 12, 1975

The Hoye Site or Hoye Prehistoric Indian Village site, now officially known as the Sang Run Site, is an archaeological site located within Garrett County, Maryland, near Oakland. Situated on the east bank of Youghiogheny River, this site was occupied by Native American groups beginning in the Archaic period and includes a significant period of occupation as a Monongahela village site from approximately 1000 to 1500 AD. It is the southernmost late prehistoric village known in the Youghiogheny drainage area and was the only known Late Woodland occupation in Garrett County at the time of its NRHP nomination.

It was listed on the National Register of Historic Places in 1975.
