= Bloomington Viaduct =

Stone/concrete arch railroad bridge spanning the Northern Branch of the Potomac River

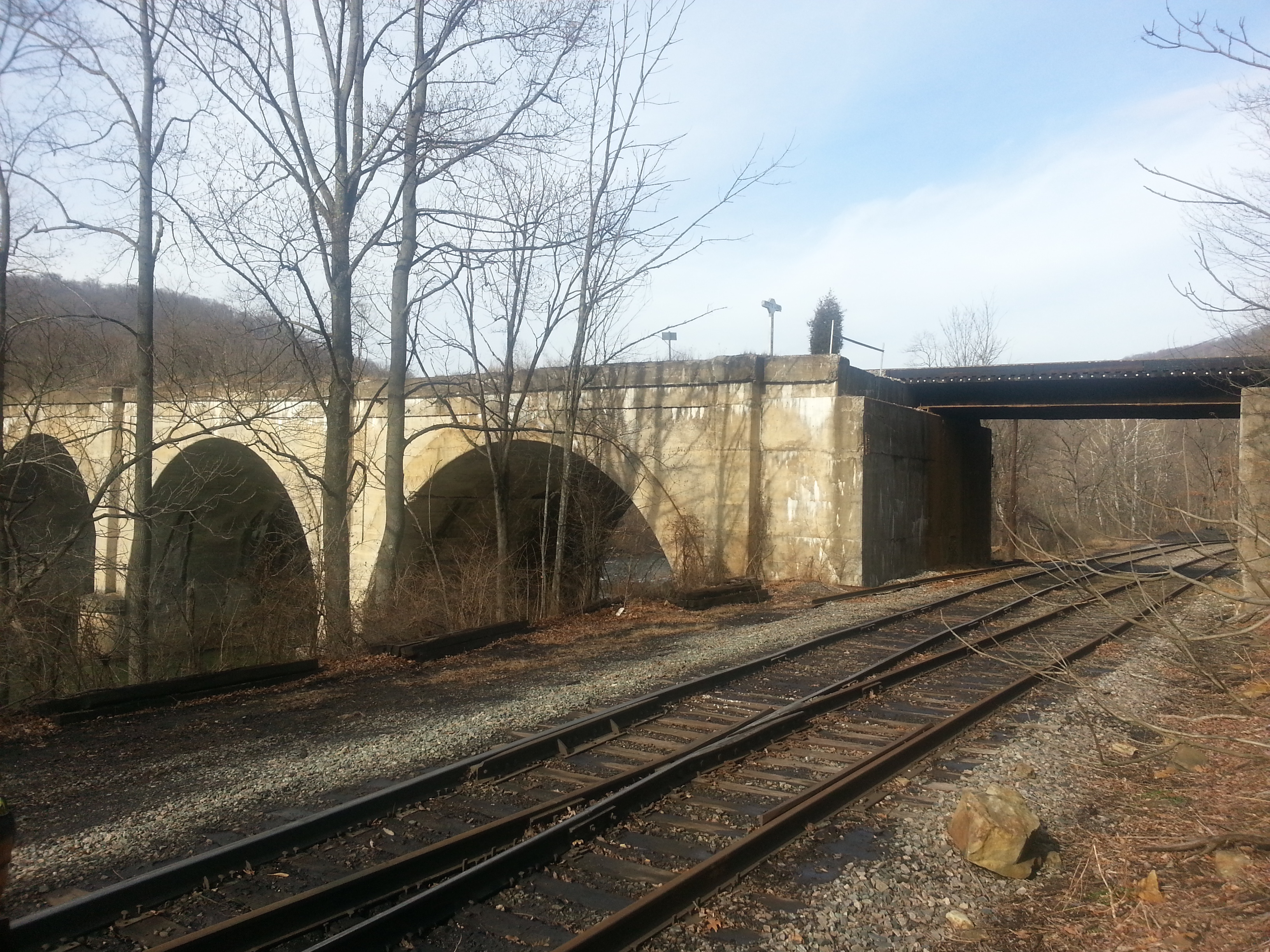
- Bloomington Viaduct in January 2014
- Coordinates: 39°28′38″N 79°4′5″W
- Carries: Railroad
- Crosses: North Branch Potomac River
- Locale: Bloomington, Maryland and Mineral County, West Virginia
- Maintained by: CSX Transportation

Characteristics
- Design: Stone arch
- Material: Sandstone and concrete

History
- Constructed by: Baltimore and Ohio Railroad
- Opened: 1851
- Bloomington Viaduct
- U.S. National Register of Historic Places
- NRHP reference No.: 76000996
- Added to NRHP: November 21, 1976

Location
- Interactive map of Bloomington Viaduct

The Bloomington Viaduct is a viaduct that spans the Northern Branch of the Potomac River, connecting Bloomington, Maryland to Mineral County, West Virginia. The sandstone railroad bridge features three full center arches, each with a 56-foot (17 m) span and a 28-foot (8.5 m) rise. It is owned and operated by CSX Transportation on its Mountain Subdivision.

== History ==
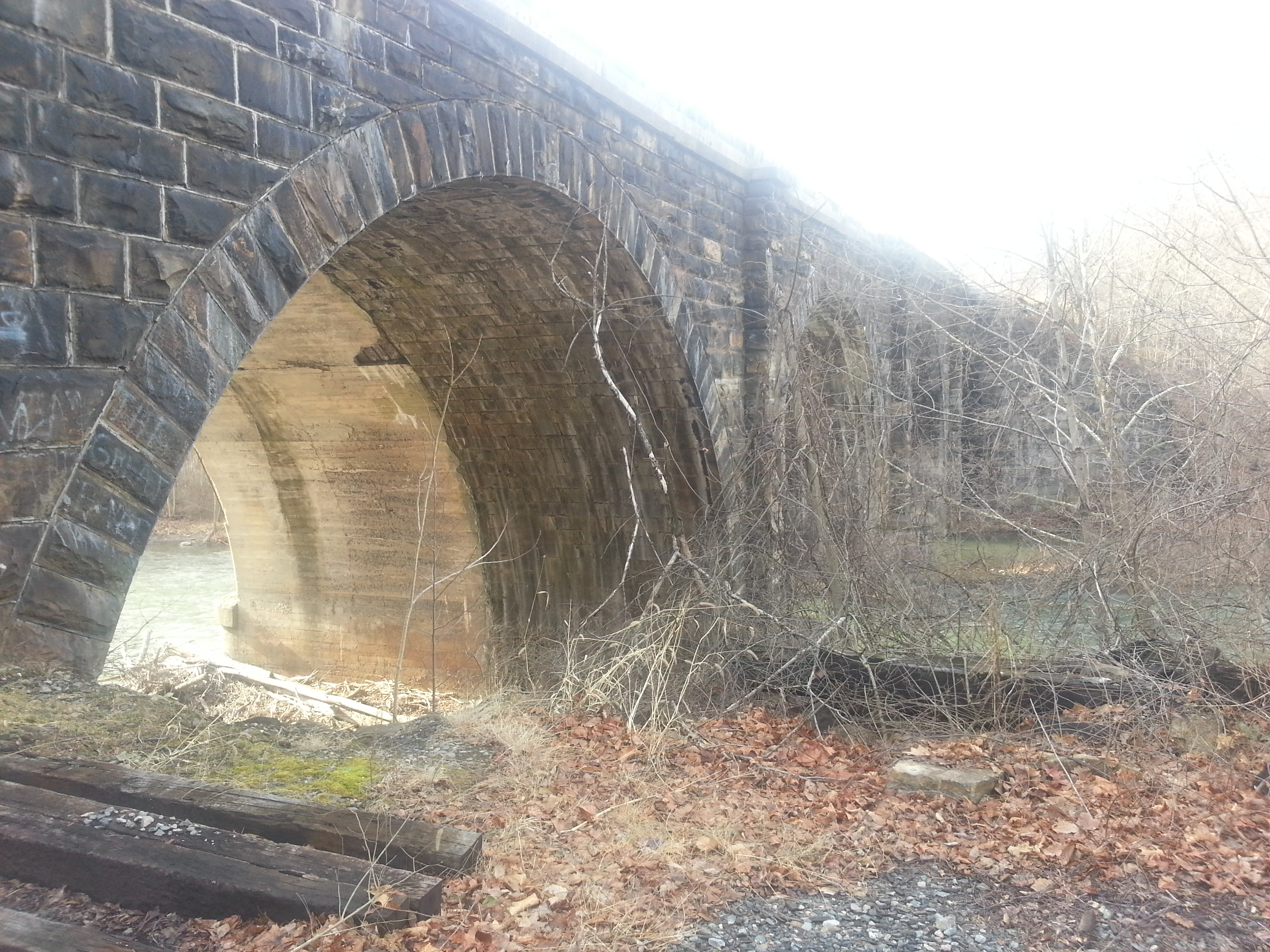
Stone side of the viaduct. The concrete addition can be seen on the far side of the arches.

When built in 1851, it carried a double track of the original Baltimore and Ohio Railroad main line. In 1916 the viaduct was widened to accommodate two more tracks. The addition is a Melan-type reinforced concrete bridge of identical configuration built against the south face of the original stone bridge. As the state boundary follows the southern bank of the Potomac, nearly all of the bridge is located in Garrett County, Maryland.

The Bloomington Viaduct was listed on the National Register of Historic Places on November 21, 1976.
