= Glamorgan (Deer Park, Maryland) =

United States historic place

- U.S. National Register of Historic Places
- Location within Maryland Location within the United States
- Location: Maryland Route 135, Deer Park, Maryland
- Coordinates: 39°25′48.1″N 79°19′31.4″W
- Area: 25.3 acres (10.2 ha)
- Built: 1888
- Architectural style: Queen Anne
- NRHP reference No.: 84001778
- Added to NRHP: September 13, 1984

Glamorgan, also known as Kittery Hill, is a large Queen Anne style house in Deer Park, Garrett County, Maryland. It is a large 2 1/2-story frame building built in 1888, as a summer house.

It was listed on the National Register of Historic Places in 1984.
