= Benson Building (Baltimore, Maryland) =

- U.S. National Register of Historic Places
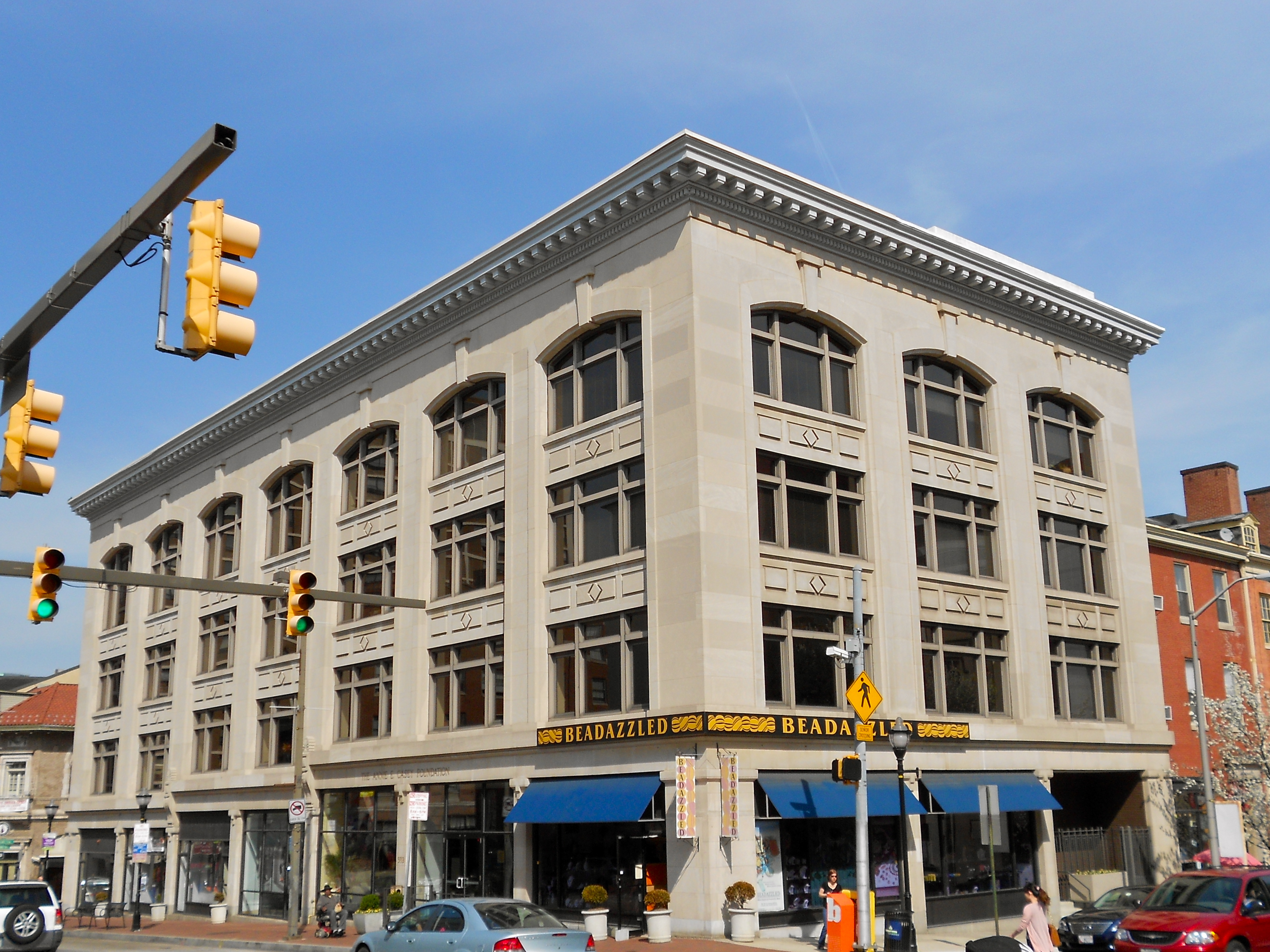
- Benson Building, March 2012

- Location within Baltimore Location within Maryland Location within the United States
- Location: 4 E. Franklin St., Baltimore, Maryland
- Coordinates: 39°17′43″N 76°36′55″W
- Area: 0.2 acres (0.081 ha)
- Built: 1911
- Architect: Baldwin & Pennington; Walters, Edward & Co.
- Architectural style: Chicago, Classical Revival, The Commercial Style
- NRHP reference No.: 80001782
- Added to NRHP: March 26, 1980

Benson Building, also known as the IPC Building, is a historic retail and office located at Baltimore, Maryland, United States. It is on the corner of East Franklin and North Charles Streets. The main side is on Charles Street and has seven bays with store windows and entrances on the first floor, and office windows on the upper floors. The recessed storefronts feature bronzed aluminum infill panels above and below the glass panes. It was constructed in 1911 and the principal original occupant was C.J. Benson and Company, a local interior decorating and furniture establishment.

The Benson Building was listed on the National Register of Historic Places in 1980.
