= Selbysport, Maryland =

Unincorporated community in Maryland, U.S.

Coordinates: 39°41′11″N 79°22′49″W

Selbysport is an unincorporated community in Garrett County, Maryland, United States. Mercy Chapel at Mill Run was listed on the National Register of Historic Places in 1984.
