= Oakland Historic District (Oakland, Maryland) =

Historic district in Maryland, United States

- U.S. National Register of Historic Places
- U.S. Historic district
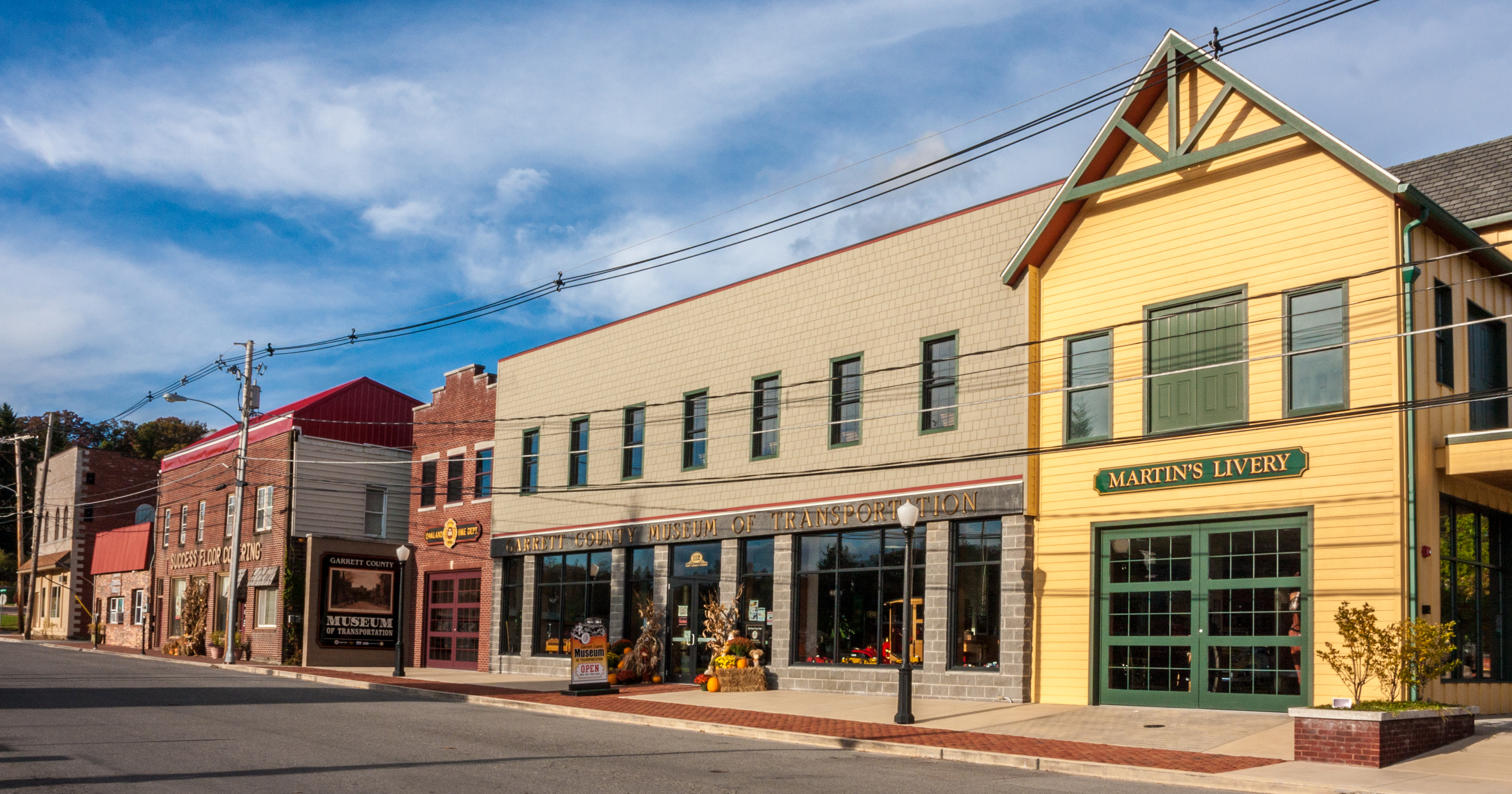
- Historic buildings along Liberty St.

- Location within Maryland Location within the United States
- Location: Roughly bounded by Oak, 8th, High, 3rd, Omaha, and Bartlet Sts., Oakland, Maryland
- Coordinates: 39°24′35″N 79°24′20″W
- Area: 78 acres (32 ha)
- Architect: Multiple
- Architectural style: Italianate, Queen Anne, Georgian
- NRHP reference No.: 84001798
- Added to NRHP: January 26, 1984

Oakland Historic District is a national historic district in Oakland, Garrett County, Maryland. It is an L-shaped area in the central and older section of Oakland containing 206 buildings. They reflect the evolution of this rural county seat from the mid-19th to mid-20th centuries. It includes the Garrett County Courthouse, but the majority of the buildings are residential, of frame construction and positioned with deep setbacks from the street, surrounded by large lawns. Several churches, schools, and a library are scattered in the district.

It was added to the National Register of Historic Places in 1984.

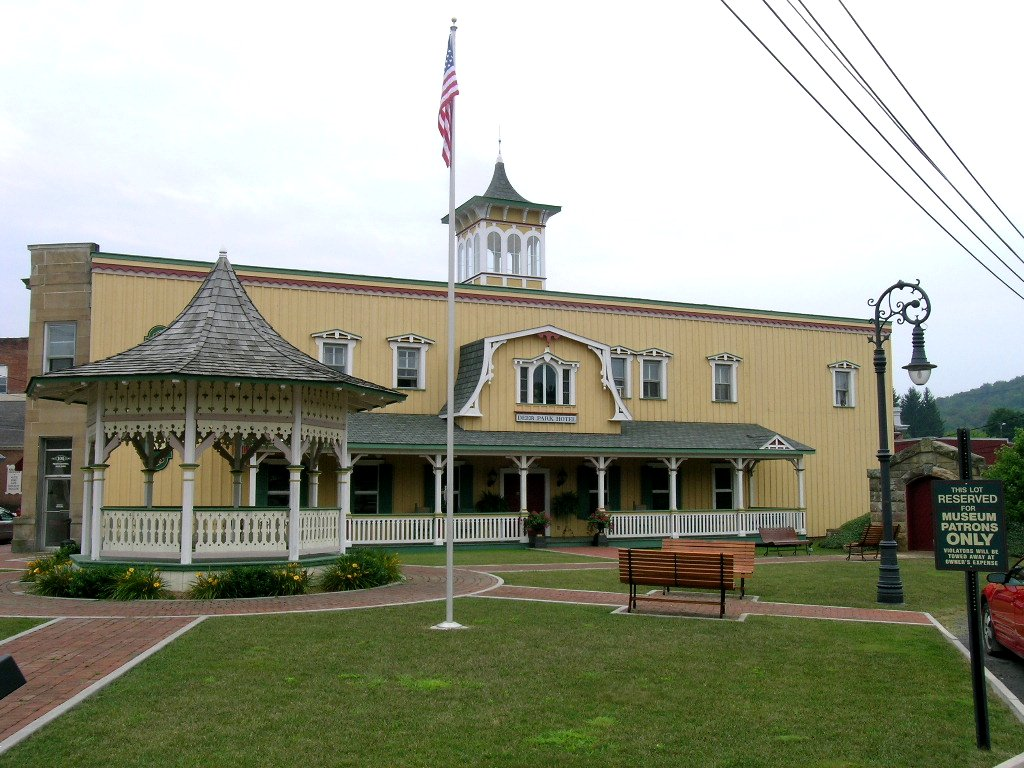
Garrett County Historical Museum

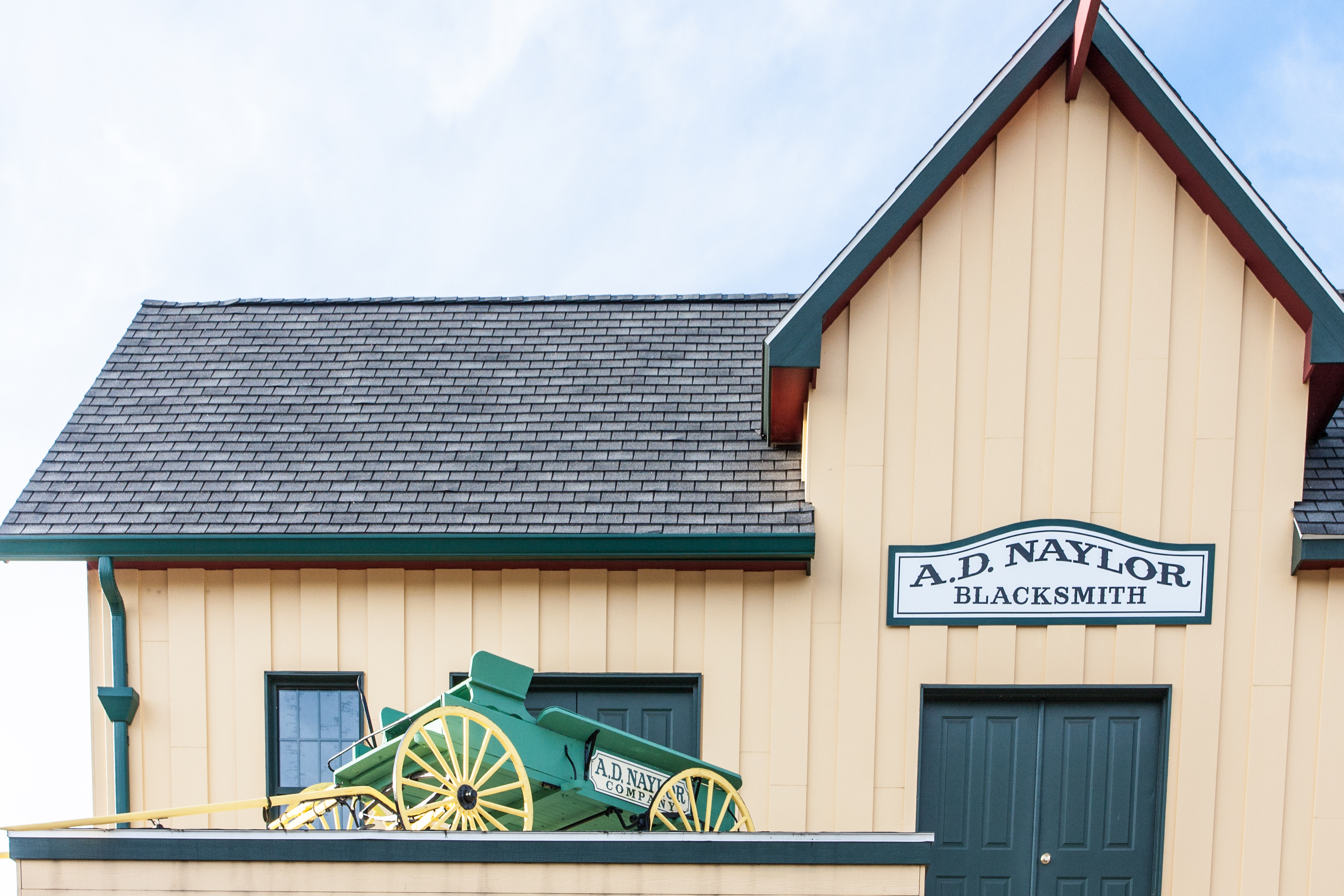
Blacksmith Shop on Liberty St.

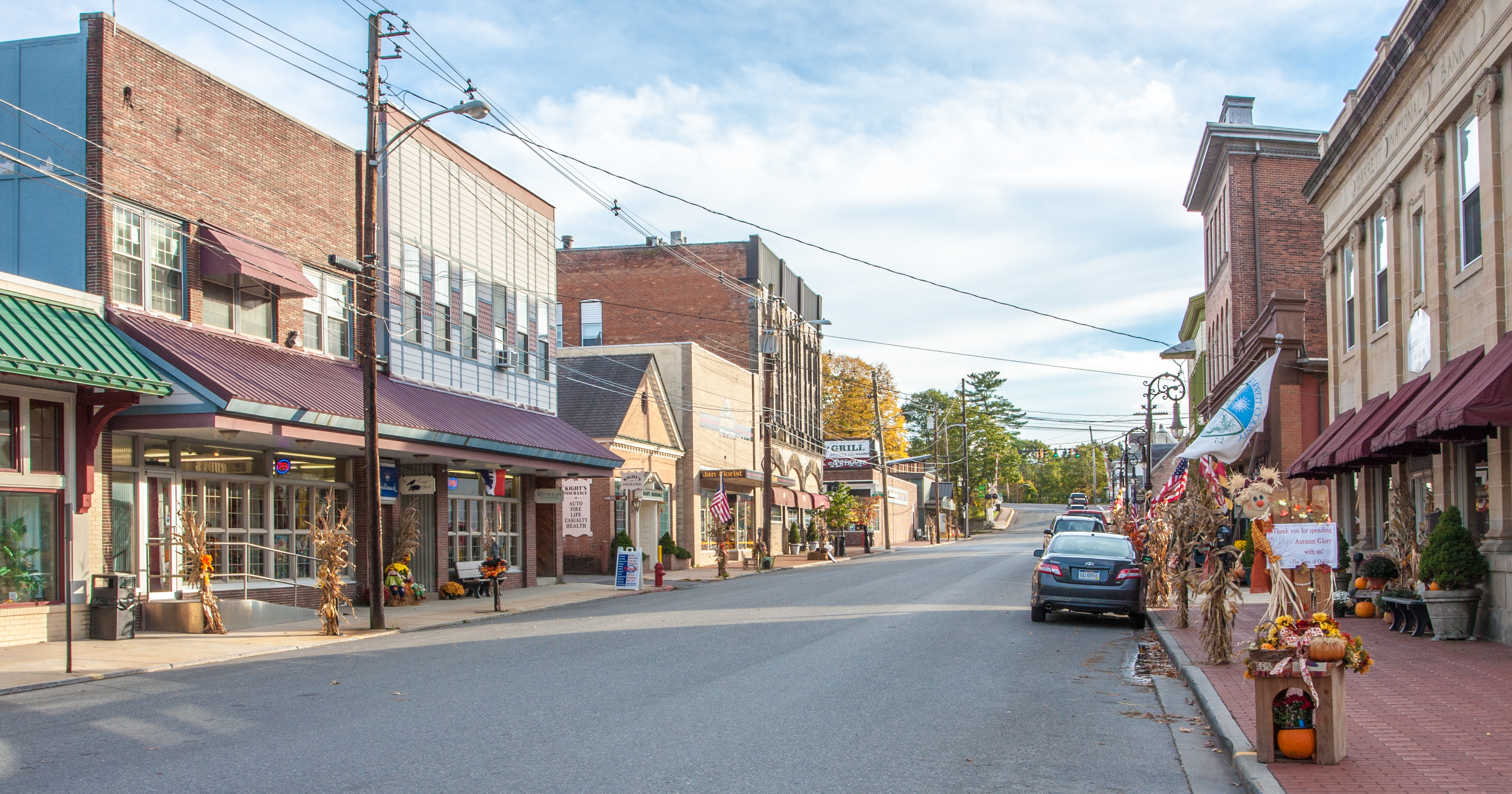
View looking south on 2nd Street

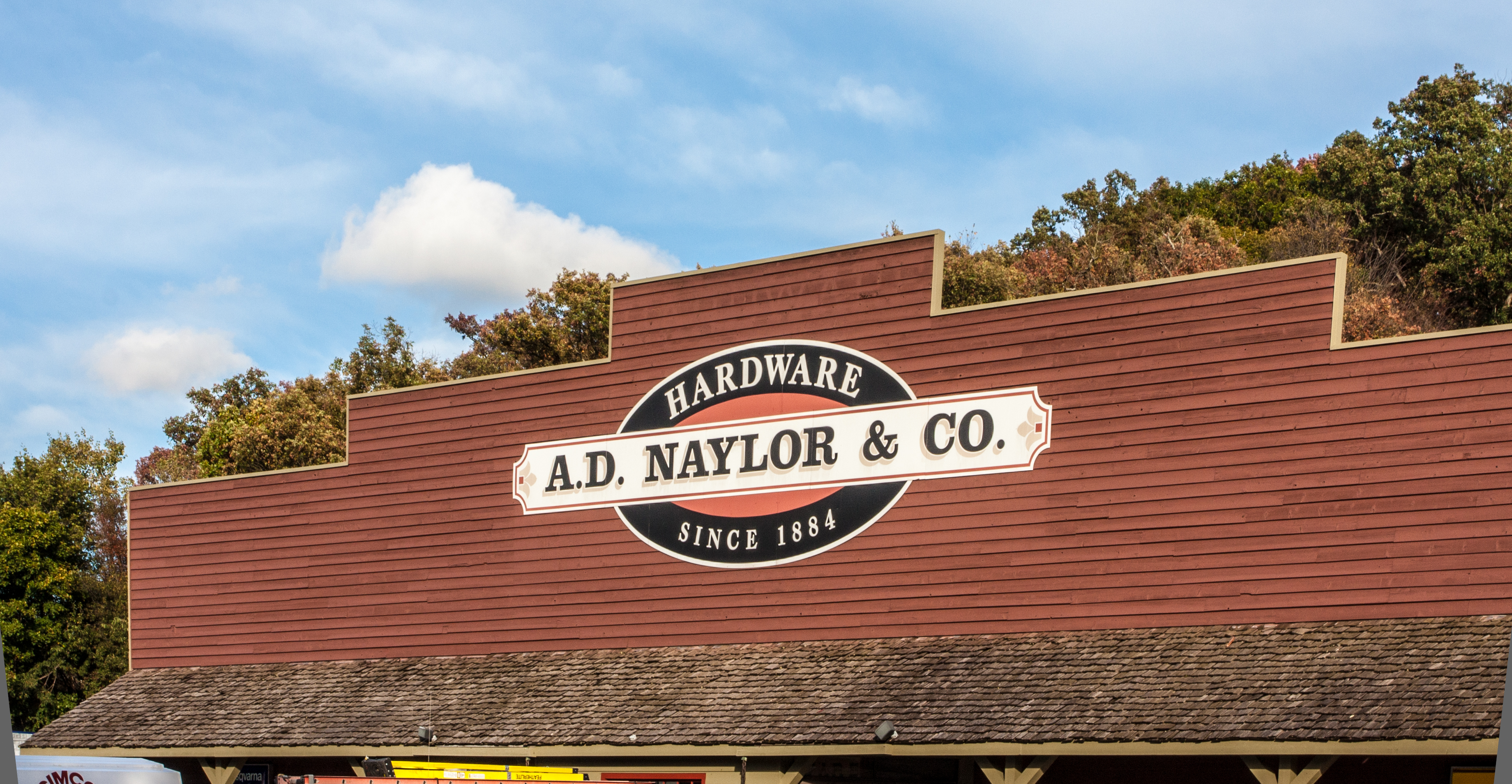
Store front for Naylor Hardware on S. 3rd St.
