= Oakland station (Maryland) =

Former railway station in Maryland, US

Oakland, MD
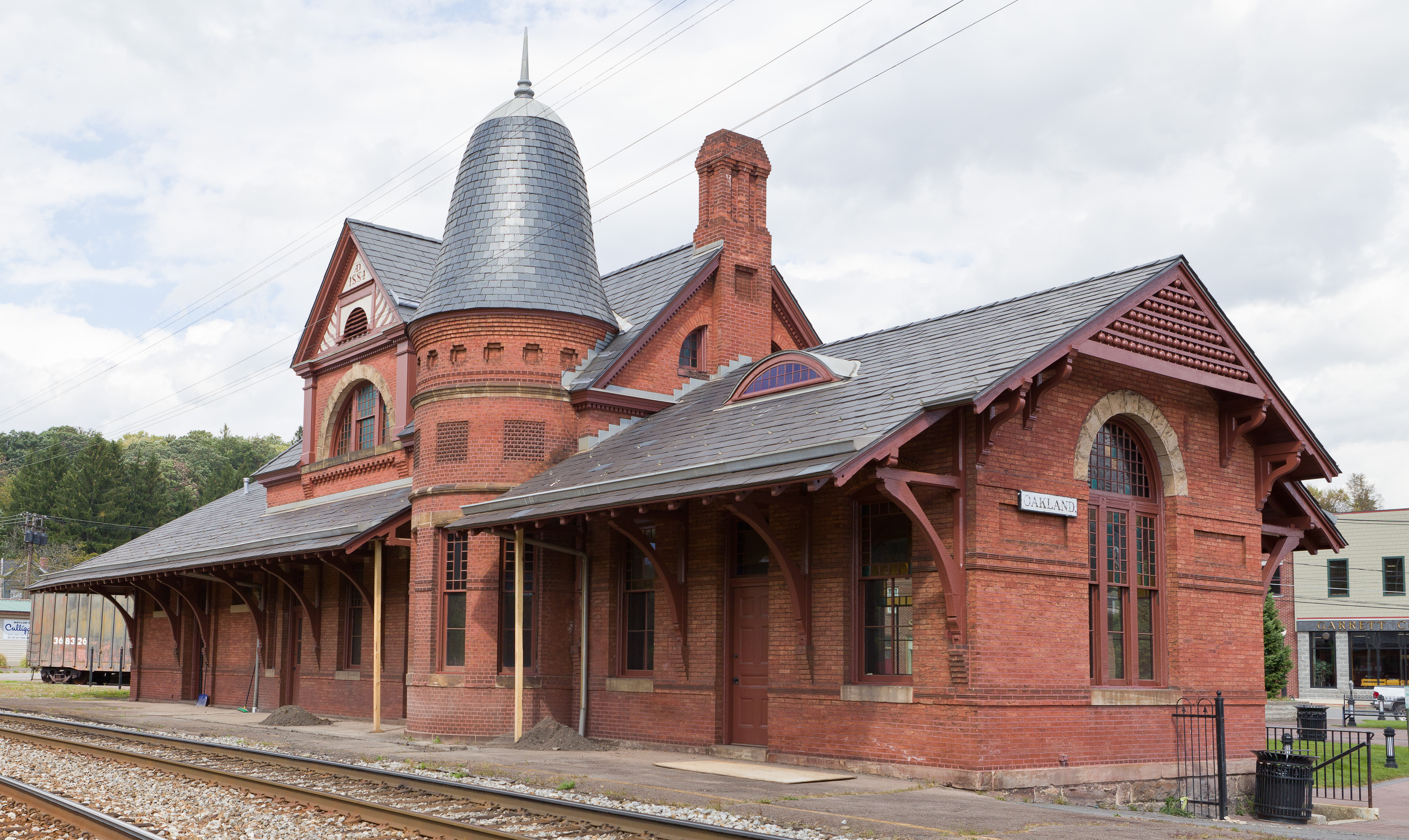
- The former station in Oakland.

General information
- Location: Liberty Street, Oakland, Maryland; USA
- System: inter-city rail station

Former services
Preceding station	Amtrak	Following station
Rowlesburg toward Cincinnati (River Road)	Shenandoah	Keyser toward Washington, D.C.
Preceding station	Baltimore and Ohio Railroad	Following station
Corinth toward St. Louis	St. Louis Line	Mountain Lake Park toward Cumberland
- Baltimore and Ohio Railroad Station, Oakland
- U.S. National Register of Historic Places
- Location within Maryland Location within the United States
- Location: Liberty Street, Oakland, Maryland
- Coordinates: 39°24′35″N 79°24′47″W
- Area: 4 acres (1.6 ha)
- Built: 1884
- Architect: Baldwin & Pennington
- Architectural style: Queen Anne
- NRHP reference No.: 74000953
- Added to NRHP: February 5, 1974
Location

Oakland station is a historic railroad station in Oakland, Maryland. It is a large brick structure with a two-story central section featuring a cylindrical tower with a domed cap and one-story wings extending from each end along the railroad tracks. It was designed by Baldwin and Pennington, and built in 1884 by the Baltimore and Ohio Railroad (B&O) across the tracks and a meadow from the Railroad's Oakland Hotel, which opened in 1876, to support the development of Oakland and Garrett County as a resort area. It is one of the finest remaining examples in Maryland of a Queen Anne-style railroad station.

It was listed on the National Register of Historic Places listings in Garrett County, Maryland in 1974 as the Baltimore and Ohio Railroad Station, Oakland. It was revived for service on Amtrak's Shenandoah between 1976 and 1981. The city of Oakland bought the station in 1998, and in 2000 restored it with help from the State of Maryland. The station is now the Oakland B&O Museum and is run by the Garrett County Historical Society.

The museum features the Baltimore & Ohio 476, a 2-8-0 Consolidation-type steam locomotive built by the Baldwin Locomotive Works in December 1920. The engine started life with the Jonesboro, Lake City and Eastern Railroad as #40, and became #76 when the St. Louis-San Francisco Railway (Frisco) acquired that railroad. After performing freight service for years, the engine was sold in 1947 to the Mississippian Railway, where it retained the Frisco number. Following several further changes in ownership, the engine was acquired by the Oakland B&O Museum in 2018 where it was renumbered and relettered as the Baltimore & Ohio 476 as representative of a typical B&O locomotive. The B&O did run 2-8-0 steam engines as its Class E locomotives. The tender mated with the locomotive was previously in operational service with the Arcade & Attica Railroad's Engine #18, and was acquired by the museum in 2018 in a swap.
