= Oakland, Maryland =

Town in Maryland, United States

- Town
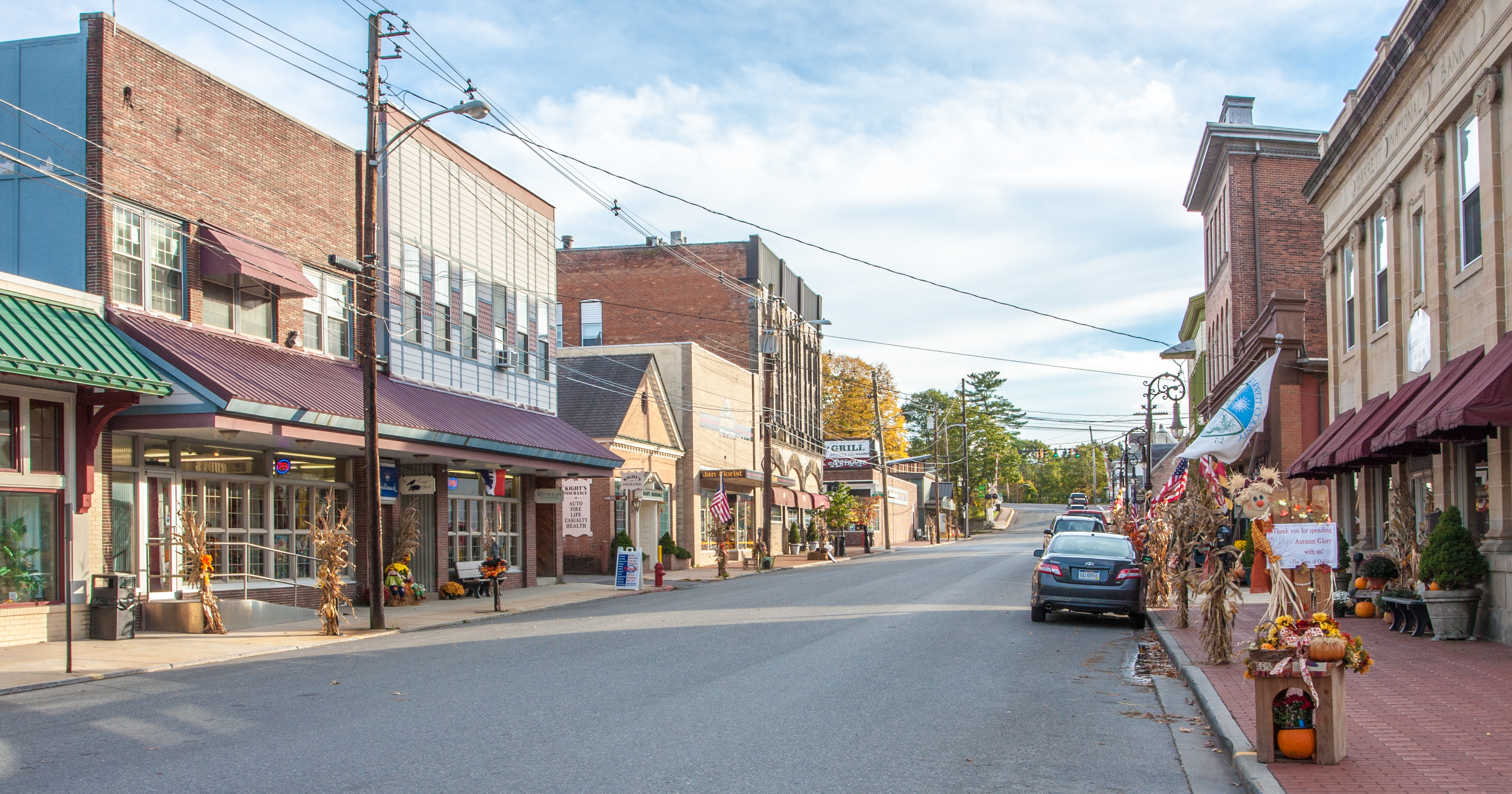
- Second Street in Oakland, part of the Oakland Historic District

- Flag Seal

- Location of Oakland in Garrett County, Maryland

- Location within Maryland Location within the United States
- Coordinates: 39°25′00″N 79°24′08″W
- Country: United States
- State: Maryland
- County: Garrett
- Incorporated: 1862

Government
  - Type: Mayor-council government

Area
  - Total: 2.72 sq mi (7.05 km^{2})
  - Land: 2.71 sq mi (7.02 km^{2})
  - Water: 0.0077 sq mi (0.02 km^{2})
- Elevation: 2,451 ft (747 m)

Population (2020)
  - Total: 1,851
  - Density: 682.5/sq mi (263.53/km^{2})
- Time zone: UTC−5 (Eastern (EST))
  - Summer (DST): UTC−4 (EDT)
- ZIP code: 21550
- Area codes: 301, 240
- FIPS code: 24-57650
- GNIS feature ID: 2391338
- Website: www.OaklandMD.com

Oakland is a town in Garrett County, Maryland, United States, and its county seat. The population was 1,851 at the 2020 census. Oakland was founded in 1851 and was incorporated in 1862

Oakland is often referred to as, “A great small town!”

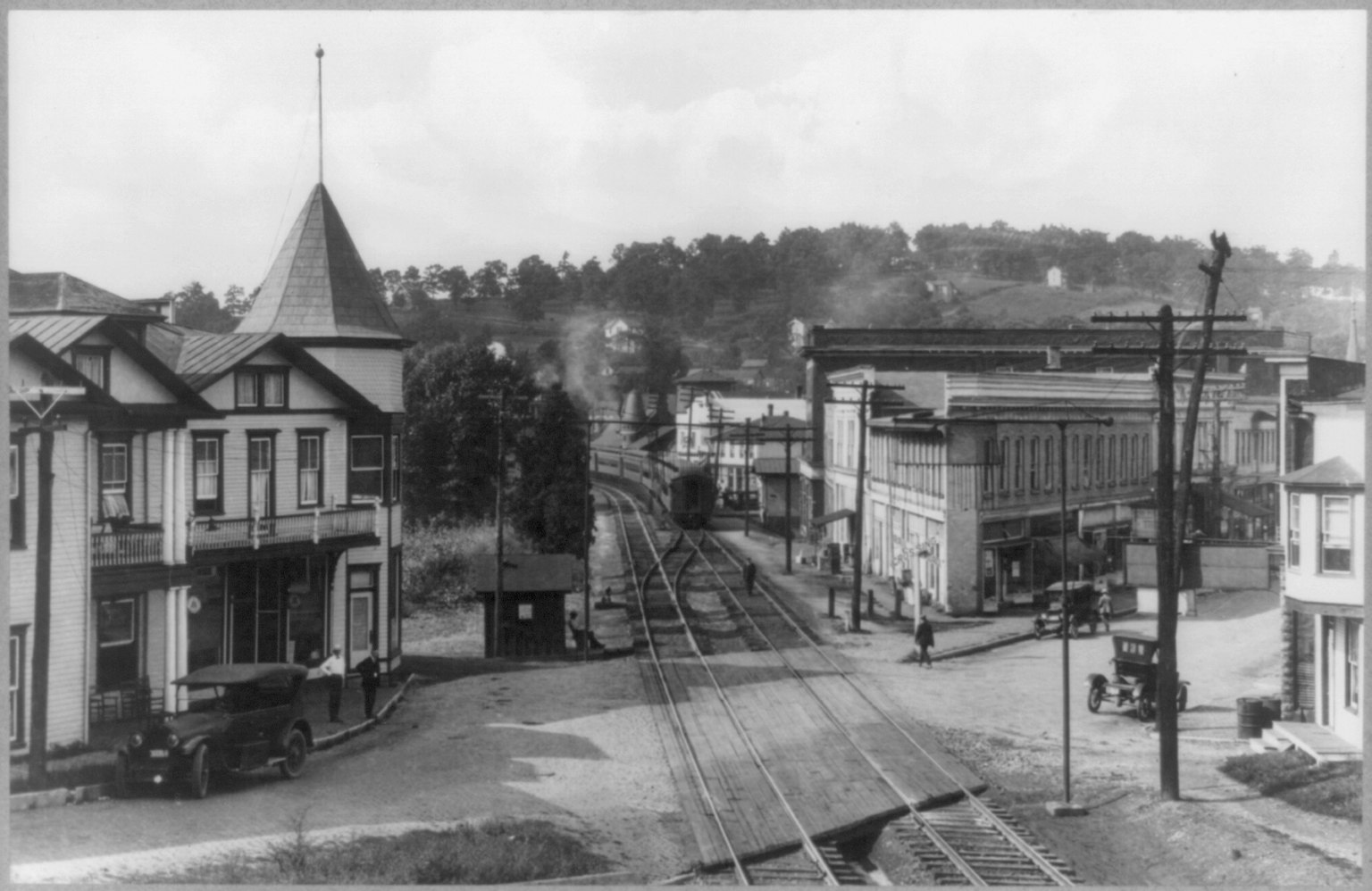
Oakland in 1910, with the Baltimore and Ohio Railroad passing through town

Oakland was formally incorporated as a town in 1862.

The town is home to the historic Baltimore and Ohio Railroad Oakland Station, which was listed on the National Register of Historic Places in 1973 and restored in the 2000s. Today, the station is mainly used for special organizations or gatherings, although trains still run on tracks behind the station. A gift shop is located within the station. Seasonal decorations and events, such as a Christmas tree, are located at the station.

The Main Street District comprises historic two- to four-story edifices with retail businesses, such as a theater, museum, bookstore, pharmacy, antique shops, clothing stores, and banks. Many of the buildings in the downtown area are Victorian architecture. Much of the central section of Oakland is part of the Oakland Historic District, listed on the National Register of Historic Places in 1984. Also listed on the National Register are the Garrett County Courthouse and Hoye Site.

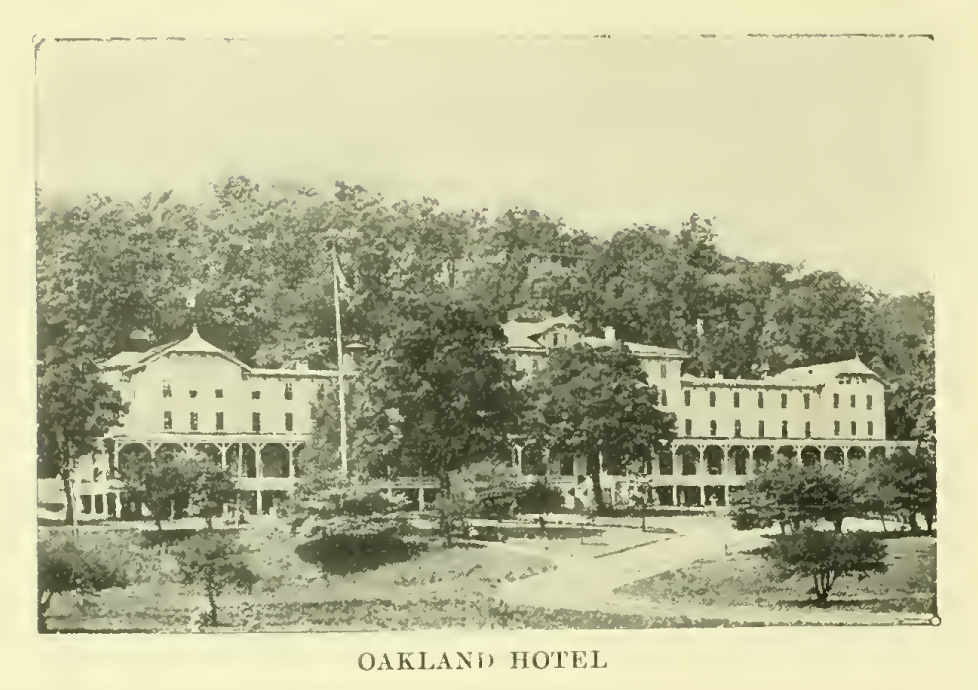
Oakland Hotel, circa 1909

In the late 19th century and early 20th century, a large hotel named the Oakland Hotel was located near Oakland Station. It was constructed in 1878 by the B&O Railroad. The hotel was a major tourist attraction until it was torn down in the early 20th century.

One of the most prominent and historic churches in Oakland is St. Matthew's Episcopal Church, where U.S. Presidents Ulysses S. Grant, James Garfield, Grover Cleveland, and Benjamin Harrison have all attended services. As a result, it is now known as the "Church of Presidents". Another prominent and historic church is St. Peter the Apostle Church, a Catholic church located on Fourth Street. A large neoclassical courthouse prominently stands in the town center.

== Geography ==
Oakland is in the south-central to western portion of Garrett County. It is set in a small valley near Deep Creek Lake. According to the United States Census Bureau, the town has a total area of 2.60 square miles (6.73 km^{2}), of which 2.59 square miles (6.71 km^{2}) is land and 0.01 square miles (0.03 km^{2}) is water.

Oakland is part of the Pittsburgh media market.

=== Climate ===
Oakland, owing to its high elevation and valley location, is among the coldest and snowiest locales in the state of Maryland, and has a warm-summer humid continental climate (Köppen Dfb). The state record low of −40 °F or −40 °C was recorded here on January 13, 1912. The monthly mean temperature ranges from 25.1 °F (−3.8 °C) in January to 68.4 °F (20.2 °C) in July, with temperatures not reaching above freezing on an average of 34 afternoons and falling to 0 °F (−17.8 °C) or below on an average of 5.8 mornings. The average first and last dates for freezing temperatures are September 28 and May 15, respectively.

The record high is 101 °F (38.3 °C) on August 7, 1918, which, together with the preceding day, are the only two instances of 100 °F (37.8 °C)+ readings on record in Oakland; from 1981 to 2010, only thirteen years ever reached 90 °F (32.2 °C).

According to weather data tallied between July 1, 1985, and June 30, 2015, for every location in the National Oceanic and Atmospheric Administration's official climate database, Oakland is the snowiest place in the state of Maryland with an average of 106.1 inches or 2.69 metres of snow per year. The most snow in 24 hours was 40.0 inches (1.02 m) on February 16, 1908, and the average first and last dates for measurable (≥0.1 inches or 0.0025 metres) snowfall are November 13 and April 7.

Climate data for Oakland, Maryland (1991−2020 normals, extremes 1893−present)
Month	Jan	Feb	Mar	Apr	May	Jun	Jul	Aug	Sep	Oct	Nov	Dec	Year
Record high °F (°C)	75 (24)	76 (24)	83 (28)	88 (31)	89 (32)	95 (35)	98 (37)	101 (38)	95 (35)	88 (31)	78 (26)	74 (23)	101 (38)
Mean maximum °F (°C)	61.0 (16.1)	61.9 (16.6)	70.5 (21.4)	79.4 (26.3)	83.7 (28.7)	86.1 (30.1)	88.3 (31.3)	86.7 (30.4)	84.5 (29.2)	78.1 (25.6)	71.2 (21.8)	62.7 (17.1)	88.8 (31.6)
Mean daily maximum °F (°C)	36.7 (2.6)	40.3 (4.6)	48.9 (9.4)	61.3 (16.3)	70.0 (21.1)	77.0 (25.0)	81.0 (27.2)	79.6 (26.4)	73.8 (23.2)	63.4 (17.4)	51.5 (10.8)	41.5 (5.3)	60.4 (15.8)
Daily mean °F (°C)	27.5 (−2.5)	30.0 (−1.1)	37.8 (3.2)	49.0 (9.4)	58.9 (14.9)	66.5 (19.2)	70.7 (21.5)	69.0 (20.6)	62.4 (16.9)	51.4 (10.8)	40.6 (4.8)	32.7 (0.4)	49.7 (9.8)
Mean daily minimum °F (°C)	18.3 (−7.6)	19.8 (−6.8)	26.6 (−3.0)	36.7 (2.6)	47.7 (8.7)	56.1 (13.4)	60.4 (15.8)	58.3 (14.6)	51.0 (10.6)	39.5 (4.2)	29.7 (−1.3)	23.8 (−4.6)	39.0 (3.9)
Mean minimum °F (°C)	−6.5 (−21.4)	−3.1 (−19.5)	5.8 (−14.6)	20.7 (−6.3)	30.0 (−1.1)	39.6 (4.2)	46.4 (8.0)	45.2 (7.3)	35.0 (1.7)	24.0 (−4.4)	12.6 (−10.8)	3.7 (−15.7)	−9.4 (−23.0)
Record low °F (°C)	−40 (−40)	−29 (−34)	−20 (−29)	−2 (−19)	17 (−8)	26 (−3)	33 (1)	30 (−1)	19 (−7)	7 (−14)	−16 (−27)	−32 (−36)	−40 (−40)
Average precipitation inches (mm)	3.90 (99)	3.56 (90)	4.32 (110)	4.33 (110)	5.34 (136)	4.91 (125)	5.14 (131)	4.33 (110)	3.69 (94)	3.61 (92)	3.38 (86)	4.29 (109)	50.80 (1,290)
Average snowfall inches (cm)	30.2 (77)	22.0 (56)	19.6 (50)	3.7 (9.4)	0.0 (0.0)	0.0 (0.0)	0.0 (0.0)	0.0 (0.0)	0.0 (0.0)	1.6 (4.1)	6.4 (16)	21.4 (54)	104.9 (266)
Average extreme snow depth inches (cm)	13.2 (34)	9.4 (24)	5.0 (13)	1.0 (2.5)	0.0 (0.0)	0.0 (0.0)	0.0 (0.0)	0.0 (0.0)	0.0 (0.0)	1.0 (2.5)	1.9 (4.8)	8.3 (21)	17.8 (45)
Average precipitation days (≥ 0.01 in)	17.4	14.1	14.8	15.1	16.1	14.7	13.4	12.3	11.7	12.7	12.4	16.0	170.7
Average snowy days (≥ 0.1 in)	11.3	8.3	6.4	1.9	0.0	0.0	0.0	0.0	0.0	0.5	2.9	7.8	39.1
Source: NOAA

== Demographics ==
Historical population
Census	Pop.	Note	%±
1880	910		—
1890	1,046		14.9%
1900	1,170		11.9%
1910	1,366		16.8%
1920	1,225		−10.3%
1930	1,583		29.2%
1940	1,587		0.3%
1950	1,640		3.3%
1960	1,977		20.5%
1970	1,786		−9.7%
1980	1,994		11.6%
1990	1,741		−12.7%
2000	1,930		10.9%
2010	1,925		−0.3%
2020	1,851		−3.8%
U.S. Decennial Census

=== 2020 census ===
As of the 2020 census, Oakland had a population of 1,851. The median age was 45.7 years. 16.0% of residents were under the age of 18 and 25.8% of residents were 65 years of age or older. For every 100 females there were 91.8 males, and for every 100 females age 18 and over there were 87.3 males age 18 and over.

91.4% of residents lived in urban areas, while 8.6% lived in rural areas.

There were 863 households in Oakland, of which 21.2% had children under the age of 18 living in them. Of all households, 32.8% were married-couple households, 22.4% were households with a male householder and no spouse or partner present, and 37.1% were households with a female householder and no spouse or partner present. About 45.1% of all households were made up of individuals and 20.5% had someone living alone who was 65 years of age or older.

There were 1,001 housing units, of which 13.8% were vacant. The homeowner vacancy rate was 1.6% and the rental vacancy rate was 5.8%.

Racial composition as of the 2020 census
Race	Number	Percent
White	1,749	94.5%
Black or African American	14	0.8%
American Indian and Alaska Native	0	0.0%
Asian	7	0.4%
Native Hawaiian and Other Pacific Islander	0	0.0%
Some other race	13	0.7%
Two or more races	68	3.7%
Hispanic or Latino (of any race)	23	1.2%

=== 2010 census ===
As of the census of 2010, there were 1,925 persons, 875 households, and 470 families living in the town. The population density was 743.2 inhabitants per square mile (287.0/km^{2}). There were 1,009 housing units at an average density of 389.6 per square mile (150.4/km^{2}). The racial makeup of the town was 98.0% White, 0.2% African American, 0.3% Native American, 0.6% Asian, 0.1% from other races, and 0.9% from two or more races. Hispanic or Latino of any race were 0.7% of the population.

There were 875 households, of which 23.1% had children under the age of 18 living with them, 40.1% were married couples living together, 10.5% had a female householder with no husband present, 3.1% had a male householder with no wife present, and 46.3% were non-families. 40.5% of all households were made up of individuals, and 16.6% had someone living alone who was 65 years of age or older. The average household size was 2.03, and the average family size was 2.73. and 24; 22.6% were from 25 to 44; 30.2% were from 45 to 64; and 22.5% were 65 years of age or older. The gender makeup of the town was 47.7% male and 52.3% female.

=== 2000 census ===
As of the census of 2000, there were 1,930 persons, 787 households, and 447 families living in the town. The population density was 915.7 inhabitants per square mile (353.6/km^{2}). There were 918 housing units at an average density of 435.5 per square mile (168.1/km^{2}). The racial makeup of the town was 98.13% White, 0.73% African American, 0.16% Native American, 0.57% Asian, 0.16% from other races, and 0.26% from two or more races. Hispanic or Latino of any race were 0.78% of the population. 33% of Oakland's residents were of German descent, 11% English, 11% Irish, 6% Italian, 2% Dutch, 2% French, 2% Polish, 2% Scottish, 2% Scotch-Irish and 2% Swedish. People of Swiss, British, Welsh and Hungarian descent each comprised 1% of the population.

There were 787 households, out of which 25.3% had children under the age of 18 living with them, 43.6% were married couples living together, 9.8% had a female householder with no husband present, and 43.1% were non-families. 38.8% of all households were made up of individuals, and 18.7% had someone living alone who was 65 years of age or older. The average household size was 2.09, and the average family size was 2.75.

In the town, the population was spread out, with 18.5% under the age of 18, 9.4% from 18 to 24, 24.0% from 25 to 44, 23.2% from 45 to 64, and 24.9% who were 65 years of age or older. The median age was 43 years. For every 100 females, there were 85.8 males. For every 100 females age 18 and over, there were 84.2 males.

The median income for a household in the town was $26,728, and the median income for a family was $38,750. Males had a median income of $29,625 versus $21,542 for females. The per capita income for the town was $16,872. About 13.3% of families and 19.0% of the population were below the poverty line, including 21.9% of those under age 18 and 21.0% of those age 65 or over.

=== Amish community ===
The Oakland area is home to an Amish community that consists of a church district of about 70 homes. The Amish community dates back to 1850 and became associated with the New Order Amish, with electricity permitted inside homes. The Amish community in Oakland has a small number of converts to the Amish faith, a rarity in the Amish world. There are only between 150 and 200 Amish converts in the United States out of a population of around 200,000. The Lancaster County, Pennsylvania, Amish have had only one successful convert in over 100 years.

== Attractions and events ==
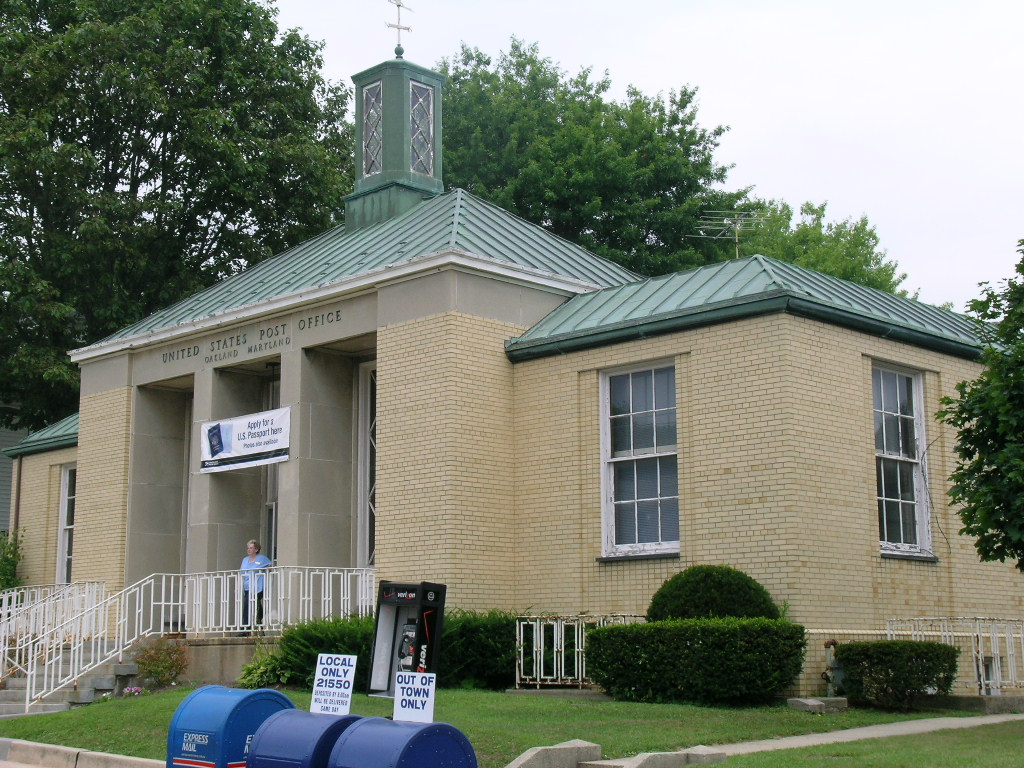
Post office in Oakland

The Oakland post office is home to a Depression-era mural, Buckwheat Harvest, painted by American artist Robert Franklin Gates. Gates was funded by the Treasury Section of Fine Arts to complete the mural as part of President Franklin Roosevelt's New Deal. Gates was probably inspired by Garrett County's strong tradition of growing buckwheat.

Oakland is home to the Oakland B&O Museum and the Garrett County Museum of Transportation.

== Transportation ==
=== Highways ===
Several state-maintained highways serve Oakland. The most prominent of these is U.S. Route 219, which follows Garrett Highway, Oak Street, and Third Street through the town. To the north, US 219 connects to Maryland Route 42, Interstate 68, and U.S. Route 40, along with the towns of Accident and Grantsville, before passing into Pennsylvania. Heading south, US 219 briefly passes through Mountain Lake Park and connects with U.S. Route 50 before entering West Virginia. Two other state highways, Maryland Route 39 and Maryland Route 135 also serve Oakland. MD 39 heads northwest to West Virginia, while MD 135 heads east, connecting to Maryland Route 560, Maryland Route 38 and Maryland Route 495, as well as the towns of Mountain Lake Park and Deer Park, before entering Allegany County near the town of Luke.

=== Public transportation ===
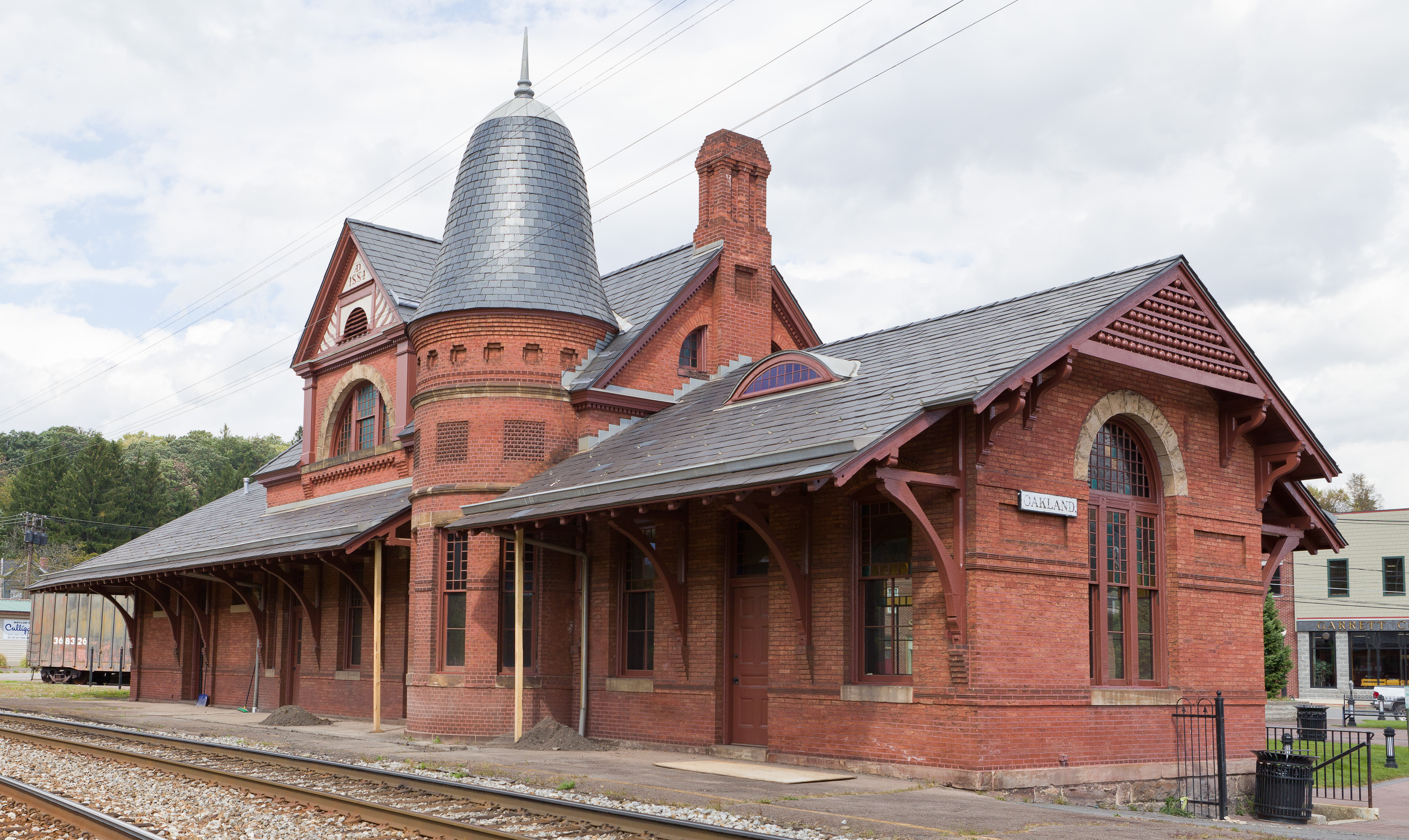
Oakland station, formerly along the Baltimore and Ohio Railroad

Potomac Valley Transit operates the 106 to Oakland on Tusedays, the service was added along with two other new routes from the agency on January 29, 2026.

Garrett County offers transit service to the general area. A shuttle service to the town was offered until September 30, 2025.

== Notable people ==
- Maurice Brookhart, chemist and professor at the University of Houston
- Darvin Moon, 2009 World Series of Poker runner-up
