= U.S. Route 219 in Maryland =

Highway in Maryland, United States

U.S. Route 219
- US 219 highlighted in red

Route information
- Maintained by MDSHA
- Length: 48.40 mi (77.89 km)
- Existed: 1926–present
- Tourist routes: Mountain Maryland Scenic Byway

Major junctions
- South end: US 219 at the West Virginia state line near Redhouse
- US 50 at Redhouse; MD 135 in Oakland; MD 39 in Oakland; MD 42 in McHenry; I-68 / US 40 at Keyser's Ridge; I-68 / US 40 near Grantsville
- North end: US 219 at the Pennsylvania state line near Grantsville

Location
- Country: United States
- State: Maryland
- Counties: Garrett

Highway system
- United States Numbered Highway System; List; Special; Divided; Maryland highway system; Interstate; US; State; Scenic Byways
← MD 218	→ MD 219

U.S. Route 219 (US 219) is a part of the U.S. Highway System that runs from Rich Creek, Virginia, to West Seneca, New York. In the U.S. state of Maryland, the U.S. Highway runs 48.40 miles (77.89 km) from the West Virginia state line near Redhouse to the Pennsylvania state line near Grantsville. Known as Garrett Highway for much of its length in Maryland, US 219 is the primary north–south route in Garrett County, connecting Interstate 68 (I-68) and Oakland. The highway also provides the main access to the resort area of Deep Creek Lake, which includes Maryland's only ski area, Wisp Ski Resort.

The part of US 219 between Oakland and Keyser's Ridge was designated as part of the original state road system in 1909 by the Maryland State Roads Commission and constructed in the early 1910s. Chestnut Ridge Road near Grantsville was upgraded to a modern road in the late 1910s, while the Seneca Trail south of Oakland was mostly built in the 1920s. The US 219 designation was assigned to Chestnut Ridge Road and Maryland Route 37 (MD 37) was assigned to the highway south of Keyser's Ridge when national and state route numbers were assigned in 1926 and 1927. The intersection with US 40 near Grantsville was the southern terminus of US 219 until the U.S. Highway was extended through West Virginia in 1935. US 219 was almost completely rebuilt in the 1940s and 1950s, and moved onto I-68 in the late 1970s. Future plans call for a bypass of Oakland and construction of freeway north from I-68 to connect with other freeway portions of US 219 in Pennsylvania.

== Route description ==
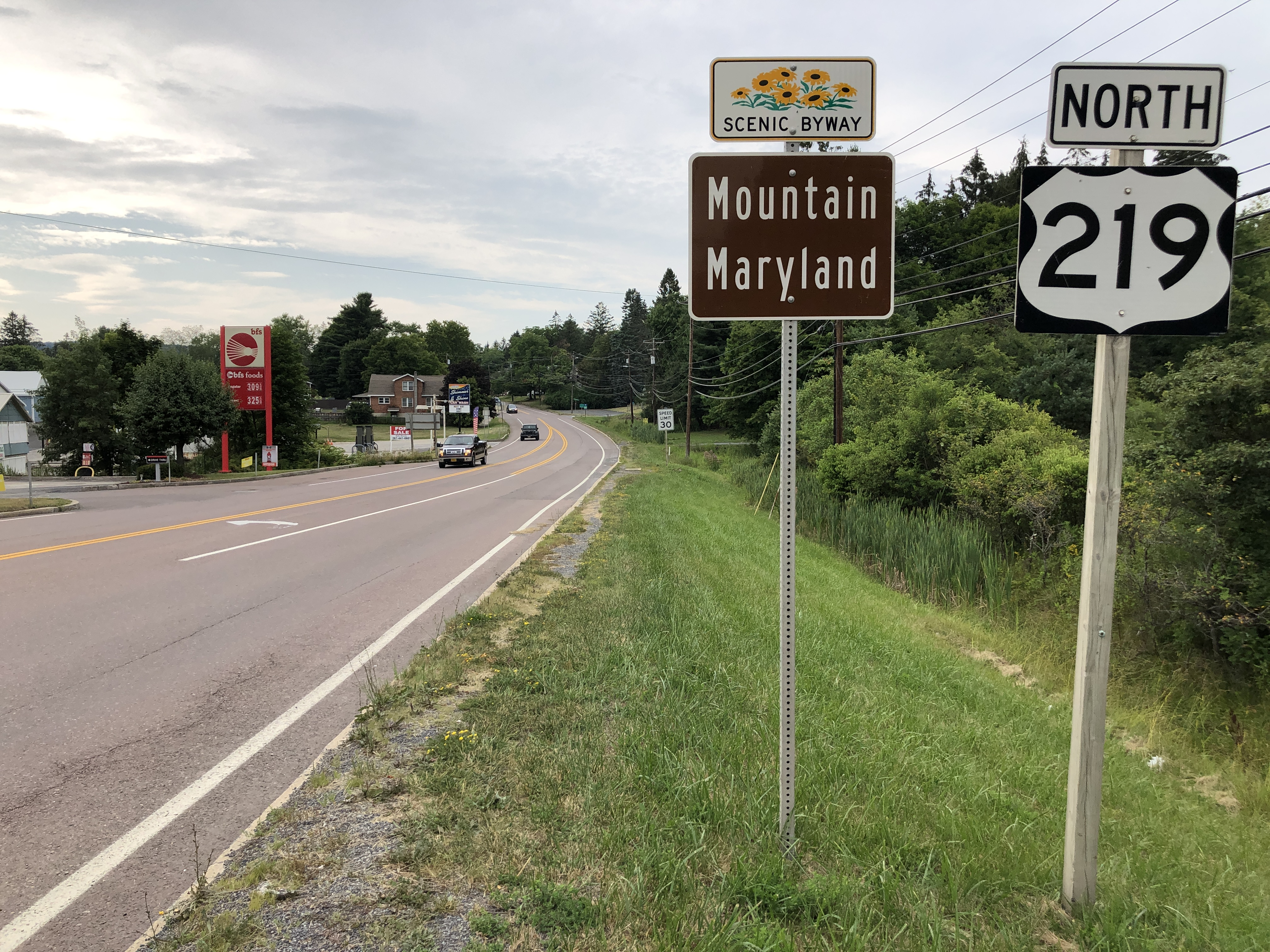
View north along US 219 at MD 135 and MD 219 in Oakland

US 219 enters Maryland in the southwest corner of Garrett County just to the west of Backbone Mountain. The U.S. Highway heads northeast from the West Virginia state line as two-lane undivided Garrett Highway. After crossing the Youghiogheny River, US 219 meets US 50 (George Washington Highway) at an intersection with a two-way stop in the hamlet of Redhouse. The highway turns northwest to intersect Ben Dewitt Road, a shortcut between US 219 and US 50 at the state line to the west, then resumes its northeasterly course heading toward Gortner, where the highway crosses Cherry Creek and Ambrose Run. US 219 veers north and crosses the Little Youghiogheny River and CSX's Mountain Subdivision before entering the town of Oakland and meeting the west end of MD 135 (Maryland Highway). The U.S. Highway turns west onto Oak Street while Ninth Street (MD 219) continues north. US 219 heads west through the Oakland Historic District. At the intersection with the eastern terminus of MD 39 (Oak Street) next to the Garrett County Courthouse, the highway turns north onto Third Street. US 219 parallels Cherry Glade Run north out of town.

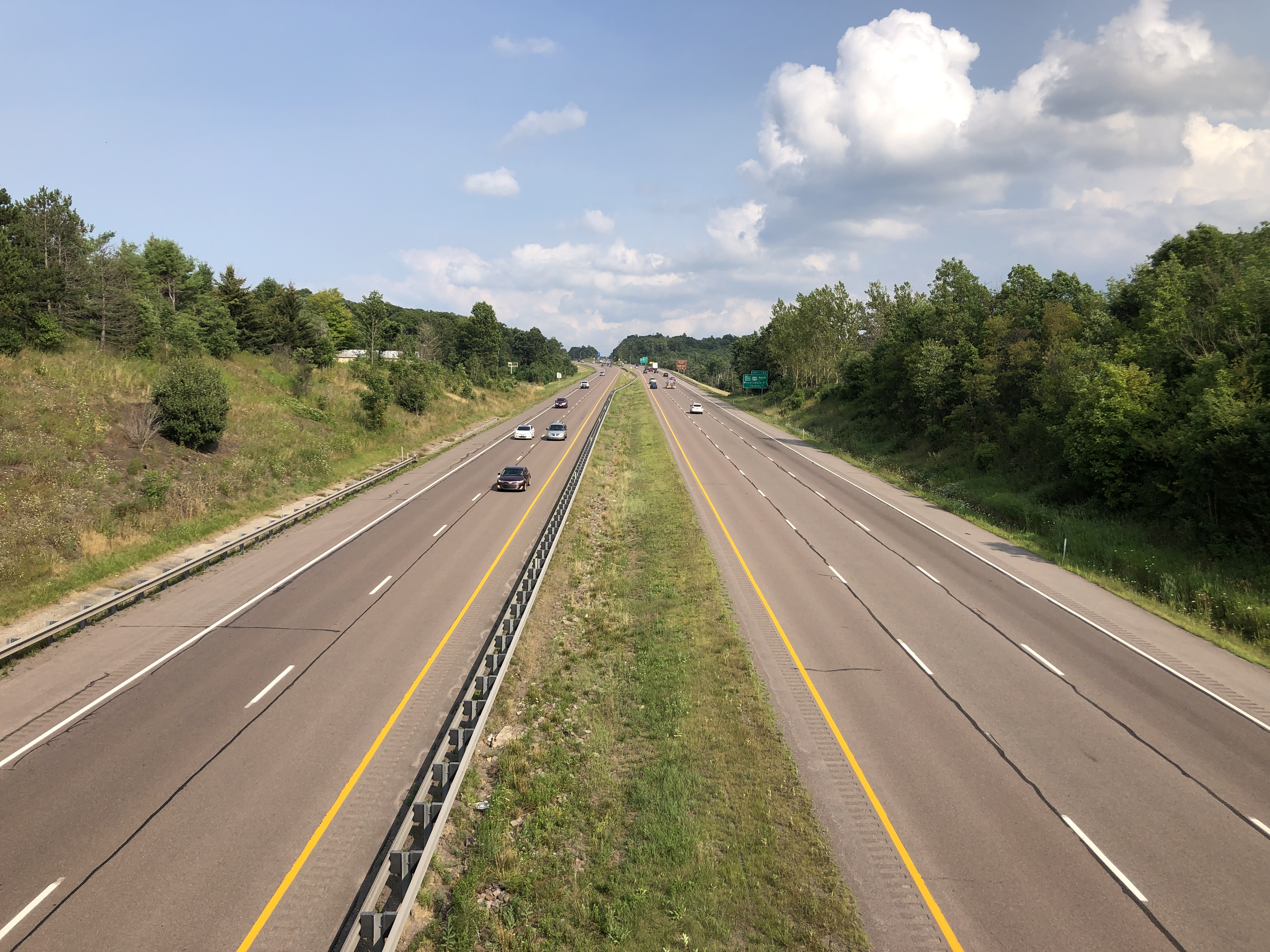
US 219 northbound and I-68/US 40 eastbound past Grantsville

US 219 passes along the eastern edge of Mount Nebo Wildlife Management Area and crosses Hoop Pole Hill. North of Sand Flat Road, the highway passes Mayhew Inn Road, which leads west to Swallow Falls State Park. US 219 descends from Hoop Pole Ridge and reaches the southwestern shore of Deep Creek Lake in the hamlet of Thayerville. After passing Glendale Road, which heads east toward Deep Creek Lake State Park and other destinations on the east side of the lake, the highway turns northwest and parallels the west shore of the lake east of Roman Nose Hill. After passing Lakeshore Drive, US 219 crosses the lake on the Deep Creek Bridge. The highway becomes a partially controlled access highway on the hillside above the lake, while Deep Creek Drive follows the shore. US 219 continues north through the unincorporated village of McHenry. In McHenry, the highway intersects Mosser Road, which provides access to the Garrett County Fairgrounds, Garrett College, and Garrett County Airport, and Sang Run Road, which leads to Wisp Ski Resort. After meeting the northern end of Deep Creek Drive, the highway leaves Deep Creek Lake and curves northeast at its junction with MD 42 (Friendsville Road). US 219 continues northeast along Rocklick Creek and the South Branch of Bear Creek. After leaving the South Branch, the highway follows Main Street through the town of Accident. Within the town, the highway intersects Accident Friendsville Road and Accident Bittinger Road, which heads east toward the James Drane House.

After leaving Accident, US 219 intersects an access road to Bear Creek Road and Fish Hatchery Road near the Kaese Mill. After the highway crosses the latter road and Bear Creek, it begins the ascent to Keyser's Ridge, with the northbound direction gaining a climbing lane. After passing Accident Garage Road, Northern Garrett High School, and a scenic overlook, the highway curves to the east and then back north as it approaches the summit. The climbing lane ends northbound and another climbing lane begins in the southbound direction. Shortly after the descent from the summit, US 219 meets I-68 (National Freeway) and US 40 at Exit 14 of I-68 at Keyser's Ridge. US 219 exits onto the eastbound direction of the four-lane freeway at a cloverleaf interchange, while US 40 heads north from the interchange to meet the west end of US 40 Alternate then turn northwest into Pennsylvania. After meeting MD 495 at Exit 19 in Grantsville, US 219 exits the interstate at a dumbbell interchange at Exit 22. At this interchange, US 219 continues north along a four-lane freeway while US 219 Bus. heads north along Chestnut Ridge Road. The highway passes over US 40 Alternate (National Pike) east of the hamlet of High Point before the freeway ends upon meeting the northern terminus of US 219 Bus. From here, the route follows two-lane undivided Chestnut Ridge Road and crosses the Pennsylvania state line, where US 219 continues north toward Meyersdale.

US 219 is part of the National Highway System for its entire length in Maryland. The highway is also part of Corridor N of the Appalachian Development Highway System from I-68 to the Pennsylvania state line.

== History ==
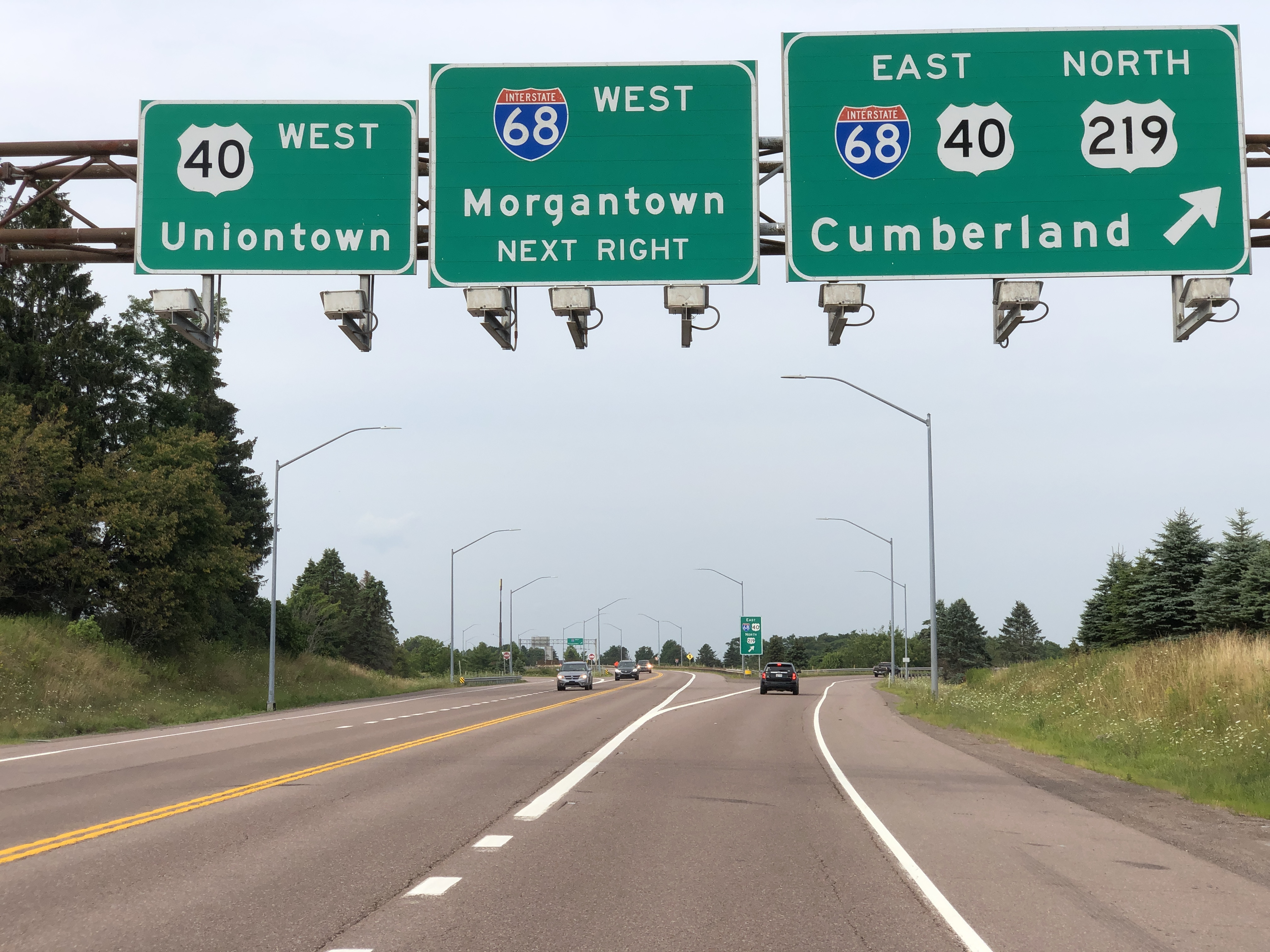
View north along US 219 at I-68 and US 40 in Keysers Ridge

In 1909, the Maryland State Roads Commission targeted the pre-existing road from the Northwestern Turnpike at Redhouse to the National Turnpike at Keyser's Ridge for upgrade to an all-weather road as part of the original state road system. The existing road followed roughly the same alignment as the present US 219, with four major deviations: south of Oakland, where the road followed Monte Vista Road, Underwood Road, and Third Street north to Oak Street; at Deep Creek, where the road crossed Deep Creek to the east of the present Deep Creek Bridge; Hoyes, where the road followed Friendsville Road north to Hoyes, then Hoyes Road east to the present alignment; and north of Accident, where the road turned northeast and used a very curvy alignment to cross Bear Creek and climb the lower slopes of Keyser's Ridge to meet the present road near Northern Garrett High School. The new highway was completed from Oakland to Thayerville in 1910. The segment from Thayerville to McHenry, which followed the pre-existing alignment, was under construction by 1911 and completed in 1913. The highway from McHenry to Accident, which bypassed Hoyes, was completed in 1914. Finally, the section from Accident to Keyser's Ridge, which bypassed the crooked road around Bear Creek, was completed in 1915.

Maryland Route 37
- Location: Redhouse–Keyser's Ridge
- Existed: 1927–1935

Once the highway from Oakland to Keyser's Ridge was completed, attention turned to the south of Oakland. The new road, constructed from Oakland to Gortner in 1915 and 1916, met the road to Mountain Lake Park, now Oakland Drive, next to Southern Garrett High School, then followed Oak Street west into the county seat. The road from Gortner to Redhouse was constructed between 1924 and 1927. The highway was paved south to the West Virginia state line in 1928. The Chestnut Ridge Road was completed in 1923. The Deep Creek Dam was constructed starting in 1923 and Deep Creek Lake began to fill in January 1925. The road was relocated around Deep Creek Lake and the first Deep Creek Bridge was built in 1924. Chestnut Ridge Road was designated the southern end of US 219 in the U.S. Highway System designated in 1926. The road south from Keyser's Ridge was marked as MD 37 in 1927. In 1935, US 219 was extended west along US 40 and then south toward West Virginia, replacing the MD 37 designation for its entire length.

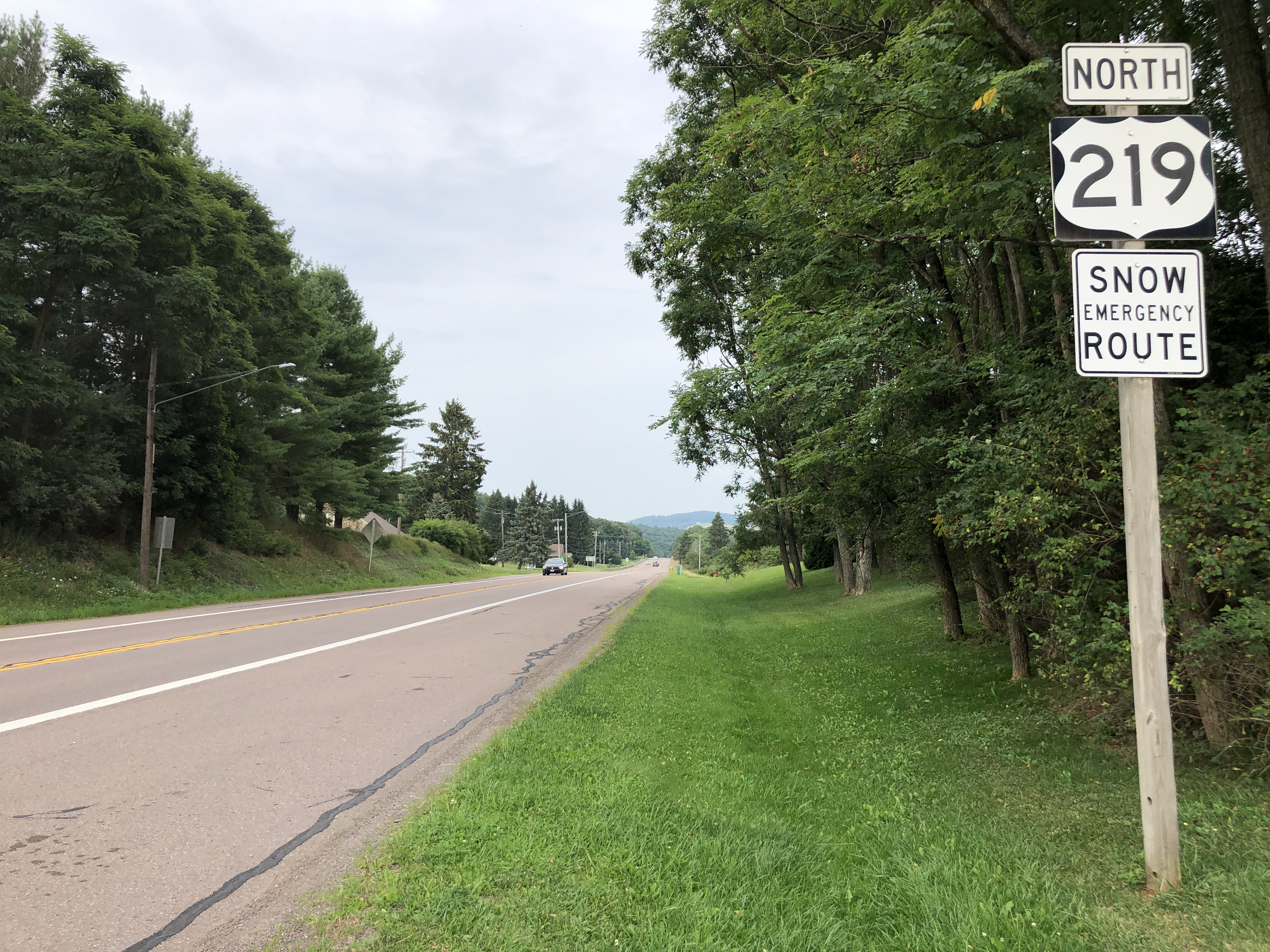
US 219 northbound in Accident

After World War II, US 219 was reconstructed into its modern form for most of its length. The segment between Oakland and Thayerville was reconstructed between 1948 and 1950. The stretch from Keyser's Ridge to Accident was relocated around 1950. The section of US 219 between Gortner and Redhouse was widened between 1950 and 1952. The stretch between Thayerville and the Deep Creek Bridge was rebuilt from 1952 to 1955. The McHenry to Accident part of US 219 was reconstructed starting in 1952. Chestnut Ridge Road was relocated around 1956. Finally, US 219 between Gortner and Oakland was rebuilt between 1957 and 1959, including a relocation at the northern end that included its present intersection with MD 135 and a bridge over the Baltimore and Ohio Railroad. In the late 1960s, US 219 was relocated from the Deep Creek Bridge through McHenry, leaving behind Deep Creek Drive as an old alignment. After the construction of I-68 in the mid-1970s, US 219 was moved to the new freeway between Keyser's Ridge and Chestnut Ridge Road in 1978. The present Deep Creek Bridge was completed in 1987, replacing the 1924 structure.

There are plans by Maryland and Pennsylvania to upgrade US 219 to a freeway northward from I-68 east of Grantsville. A breakout project within that Maryland-Pennsylvania freeway upgrade project realigned US 219 from I-68 to Old Salisbury Road in Maryland. A groundbreaking ceremony for the realignment of US 219 between I-68 and Old Salisbury Road was held on October 13, 2018, with Governor Larry Hogan in attendance. The new alignment of US 219, which cost $63 million, opened on May 5, 2021, with the former alignment becoming US 219 Bus.

== Future ==
The Oakland Bypass will run from the present intersection of US 219 and MD 135 on the east edge of the town to US 219 north of Oakland.

== Junction list ==
The entire route is in Garrett County.

Location	mi	km	Exit	Destinations	Notes
Redhouse	0.00	0.00		US 219 south (Seneca Trail) – Thomas, Parsons	West Virginia state line; southern terminus of US 219 in Maryland
Redhouse	3.01	4.84		US 50 (George Washington Highway) – Grafton, WV, Romney, WV	
Oakland	10.93	17.59		MD 135 east (Maryland Highway) / MD 219 north (Ninth Street) – Mountain Lake Park, Westernport	Western terminus of MD 135; southern terminus of MD 219; US 219 turns west onto Oak Street
Oakland	11.47	18.46		MD 39 west (Oak Street) – Crellin, Hutton	Eastern terminus of MD 39; US 219 turns north onto Third Street
McHenry	25.88	41.65		MD 42 north (Friendsville Road) – Friendsville	Southern terminus of MD 42
Keyser's Ridge	37.42	60.22	14	I-68 west (National Freeway) / US 40 west (National Pike) – Morgantown, Uniontown	Southern end of concurrency with I-68 / US 40; US 219 uses I-68 exit numbers
Grantsville	42.80	68.88	19	MD 495 (Bittinger Road) – Grantsville, Swanton	
Grantsville	45.86	73.80	22	I-68 east / US 40 east (National Freeway) – Cumberland, Hancock US 219 Bus. north (Chestnut Ridge Road)	Northern end of concurrency with I-68 / US 40; southern terminus of US 219 Bus.
Grantsville	47.06	75.74		US 219 Bus. south (Chestnut Ridge Road)	Northern terminus of US 219 Bus.
Grantsville	48.40	77.89		US 219 north (Mason Dixon Highway) – Somerset, Johnstown	Pennsylvania state line; northern terminus of US 219 in Maryland
1.000 mi = 1.609 km; 1.000 km = 0.621 mi: Concurrency terminus

== Related routes ==
=== Chestnut Ridge business loop ===
U.S. Route 219 Business
- Location: Chestnut Ridge, Maryland
- Length: 1.12 mi (1.80 km)
- Existed: 2021–present

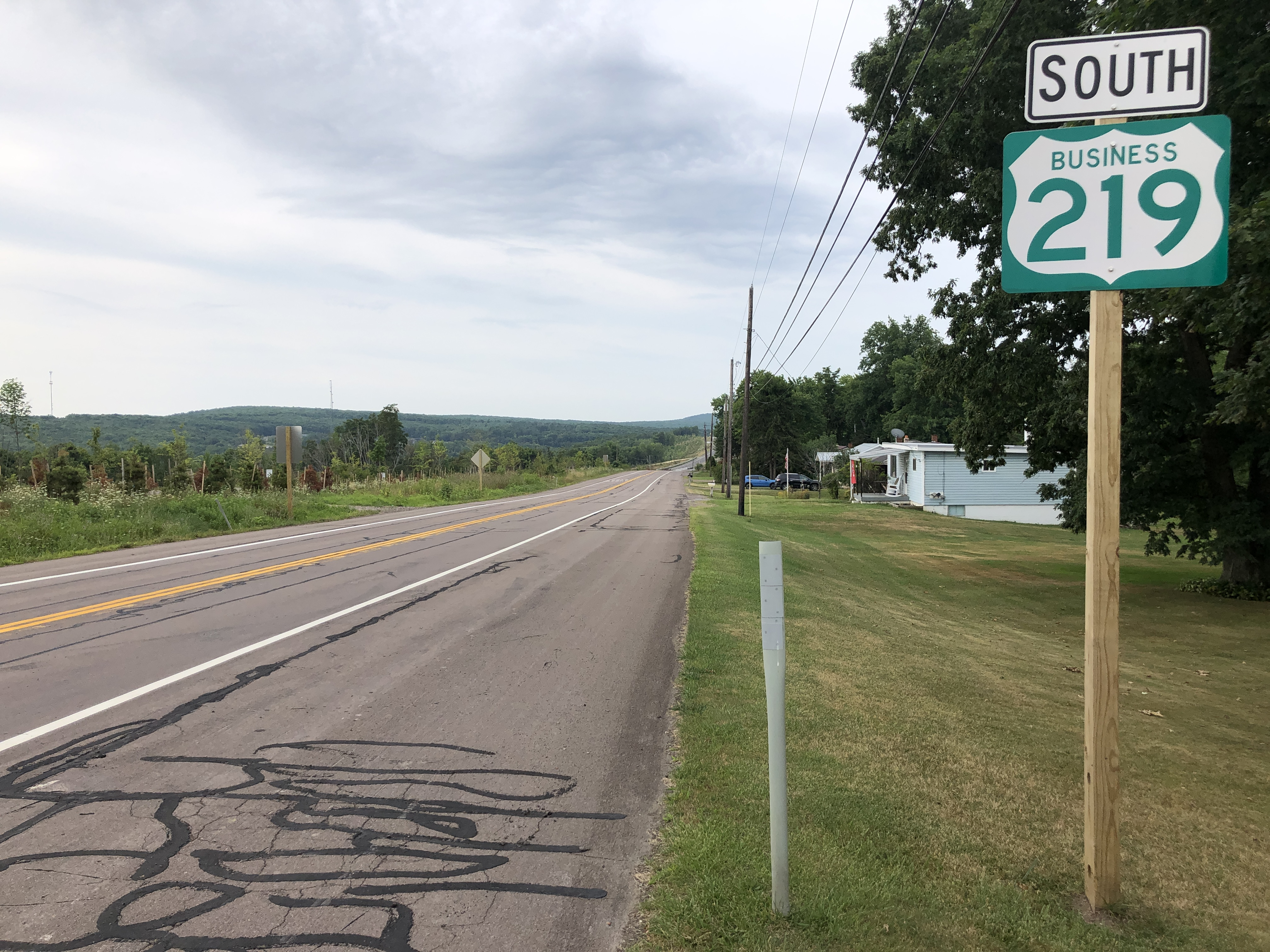
US 219 Bus. southbound past US 219 north of Grantsville

U.S. Route 219 Business is a business route located east of Grantsville on Chestnut Ridge that runs 1.12 mi (1.80 km) from a dumbbell interchange with I-68/US 40 and US 219 north to an intersection with US 219, following Chestnut Ridge Road. The route was designated onto the former alignment of US 219 following the opening of a freeway bypass on May 5, 2021.

=== Auxiliary routes ===
US 219 has nine unsigned auxiliary routes, several of which connect with segments of MD 826. US 219A and US 219B are found around Oakland, US 219C through 219G are located between Accident and Keyser's Ridge, and US 219J and US 219K are near Grantsville.

- US 219A is the designation for Weber Road, a 0.10-mile (0.16 km) connector between MD 826A (Weber Road/SHA Drive) and the intersection of US 219 and MD 826B (Lumber City Road) in Oakland.
- US 219B is the designation for an unnamed 0.01-mile (0.016 km) connector between US 219 and MD 826C between Gortner and Oakland.
- US 219C is the designation for an unnamed 0.01-mile (0.016 km) connector between US 219 and MD 826G between Accident and Bear Creek.
- US 219D is the designation for a 0.01-mile (0.016 km) connector between US 219 and MD 826J (Stockyard Road) near its southern end in Keyser's Ridge.
- US 219E is the designation for a 0.01-mile (0.016 km) connector between US 219 and MD 826J (Stockyard Road) near its northern end in Keyser's Ridge.
- US 219F is the designation for a 0.02-mile (0.032 km) connector between US 219 and MD 826K south of Keyser's Ridge.
- US 219G is the designation for Ryland Court, a 0.04-mile (0.064 km) connector between US 219 and MD 826L south of Keyser's Ridge.
- US 219J is the designation for a 0.14-mile (0.23 km) segment of Chestnut Ridge Road immediately south of Exit 22 of I-68.
- US 219K is the designation for a 0.09-mile (0.14 km) segment of Chestnut Ridge Road running from US 219 Bus. north to US 219 near the northern terminus of US 219 Bus.

== See also ==
U.S. Route 219
Previous state: West Virginia	Maryland	Next state: Pennsylvania
