= Asher Glade, Maryland =

Unincorporated community in Maryland, United States

- Unincorporated community
- Location within Maryland
- Coordinates: 39°42′14″N 79°26′50″W
- Country: United States
- State: Maryland
- County: Garrett
- Elevation: 1,955 ft (596 m)
- Time zone: UTC−5 (Eastern (EST))
  - Summer (DST): UTC−4 (EDT)
- Area codes: 301, 240
- GNIS feature ID: 588611

Asher Glade is an unincorporated community in Garrett County, Maryland, United States. Asher Glade is located on Maryland Route 42, 3.6 miles (5.8 km) northwest of Friendsville.
