= Creedmoor =

Creedmoor may refer to:

== Places in the United States ==
- Creedmoor, North Carolina
- Creedmoor, Texas

== Other uses ==
- Creedmoor Branch, Queens, New York
- 6.5mm Creedmoor, a centerfire rifle cartridge
- Creedmoor Psychiatric Center, Queens, New York
- Creedmoor Rifle Range, Queens, New York

== See also ==
- Creedmore (Mountain Lake Park, Maryland), a historic home listed on the NRHP in Maryland
