= Hoyes, Maryland =

Unincorporated community in Maryland, United States

- Unincorporated community
- Location within Maryland
- Coordinates: 39°35′25″N 79°22′10″W
- Country: United States
- State: Maryland
- County: Garrett
- Elevation: 2,566 ft (782 m)
- Time zone: UTC-5 (Eastern (EST))
  - Summer (DST): UTC-4 (EDT)
- Area codes: 301, 240
- GNIS feature ID: 588674

Hoyes is an unincorporated community in Garrett County, Maryland, United States. Hoyes is located on Maryland Route 42, 3.75 miles (6.04 km) southwest of Accident.
