= Accident, Maryland =

- Town
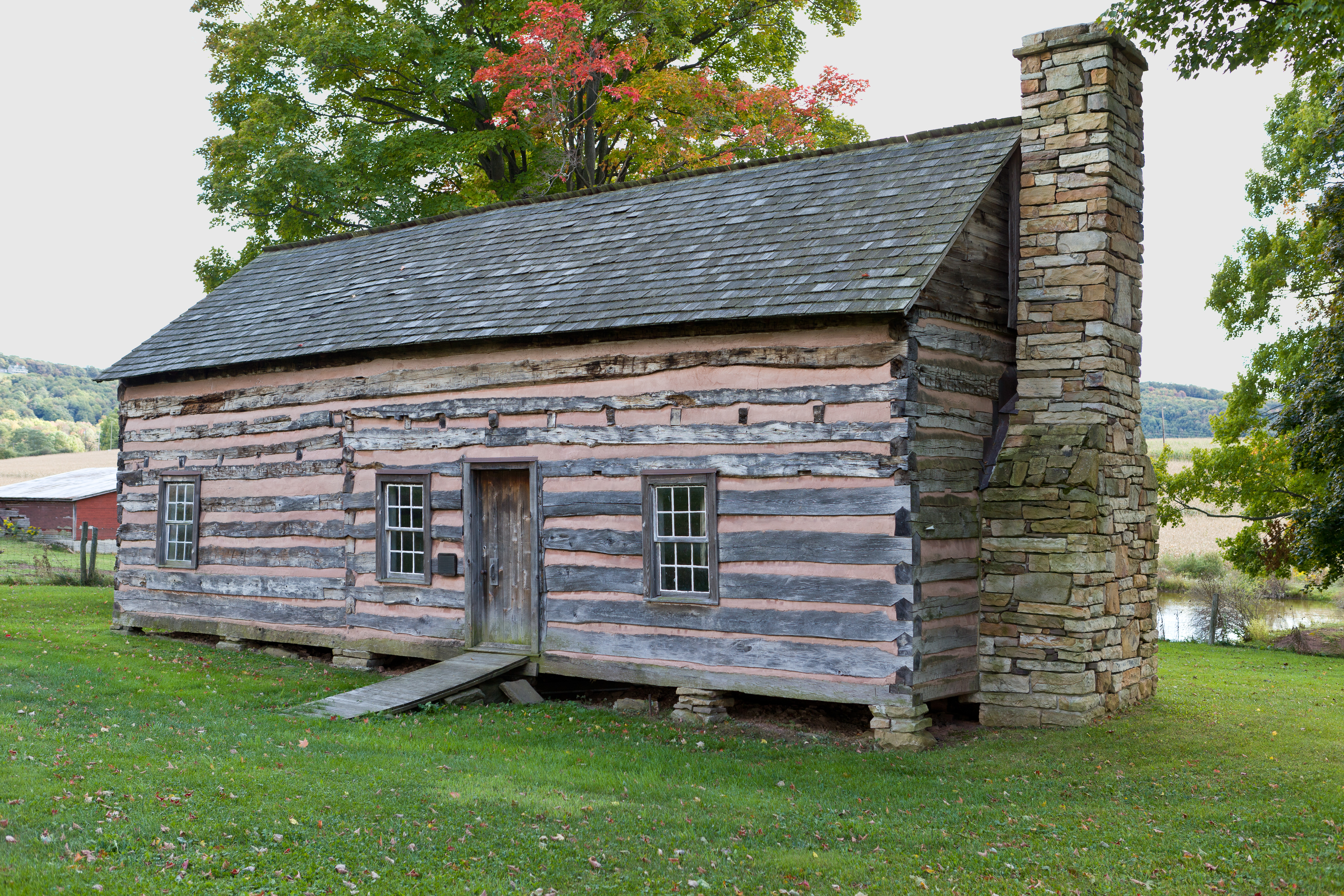
- James Drane House in 2012

- Seal

- Location of Accident, Maryland

- Location within Maryland Location within the United States Location within North America
- Coordinates: 39°37′41″N 79°19′12″W
- Country: United States
- State: Maryland
- County: Garrett
- Patented: 1786
- Incorporated: 1916

Area
  - Total: 0.49 sq mi (1.28 km^{2})
  - Land: 0.49 sq mi (1.28 km^{2})
  - Water: 0 sq mi (0.00 km^{2})
- Elevation: 2,356 ft (718 m)

Population (2020)
  - Total: 338
  - Density: 683.7/sq mi (263.97/km^{2})
- Demonym: Accidental
- Time zone: UTC-5 (Eastern (EST))
  - Summer (DST): UTC-4 (EDT)
- ZIP code: 21520
- Area codes: 301, 240
- FIPS code: 24-00225
- GNIS feature ID: 2390695
- Website: www.accidentmd.org

Accident is a town in Garrett County, Maryland, United States. The population was 338 at the 2020 United States census. Accident has been noted for its unusual name. A resident of Accident is called an "Accidental".

== History ==
Accident was one of the early settlements in the far west of Maryland. The name originates about the time of the 1786 land survey. Though the origin or meaning of the name is obscure, one popular story says that Brooke Beall and William Deakins, Jr., (Note: Deakins later served as a delegate to the Maryland State Convention of 1788, to vote whether Maryland should ratify the proposed Constitution of the United States.) friends from Prince George's County, were conducting separate surveys in the area at the time and "by accident" Deakins claimed land already surveyed by Beall.

When Lord Baltimore opened up the area, which he called Monocacy Manor, for settlement, in the early 1770s, Brooke Beall secured permission to survey 778 acres (315 hectares; 1.216 square miles). It will never be known for certain how Beall came to choose this particular spot, but the surveyor was given clear instructions where to start. He was to begin "in the center between two bounded white oak trees, standing on the North Side of the South fork of Bear Creek in or near a glade about one Hundred yards from said Run, about one or two Miles above a Lick known by the name of the "Cole Mine Lick", about four miles (6.4 km) above the mouth of Broad Creek and about one mile (1.6 km) East of a Ridge of the Negro Mountain." John Hanson, Jr., later a delegate to the Continental Congress, and President of the United States in Congress Assembled, on April 14, 1774, surveyed the land, finding that it only contained 682 acres (276 hectares). For the next twelve years, nothing was done with the survey. The American Revolutionary War intervened, and it was not until February 15, 1786, that the land was granted by means of a patent to William Deakins. The following year the surrounding countryside was surveyed into military lots by Francis Deakins, lots that were meant as compensation for the soldiers who served from Maryland during the Revolution. Each soldier who served for two years received one lot of 50 acres (20 hectares), officers received four lots of 50 acres (20 hectares) each. (Note: Mr. George Deakins was to receive 600 acres of land in Western Maryland as a payment of a debt from King George II of Great Britain. Mr. Deakins sent out two corps of engineers, each without knowledge of the other, to survey the best land in this area. Both crews returned and to their surprise, they had both marked the same Oak tree as their starting and returning points. Mr. Deakins chose this plot of ground and had it patented "The Accident Tract". Now called, the Town of Accident! Accident was incorporated in 1916.)

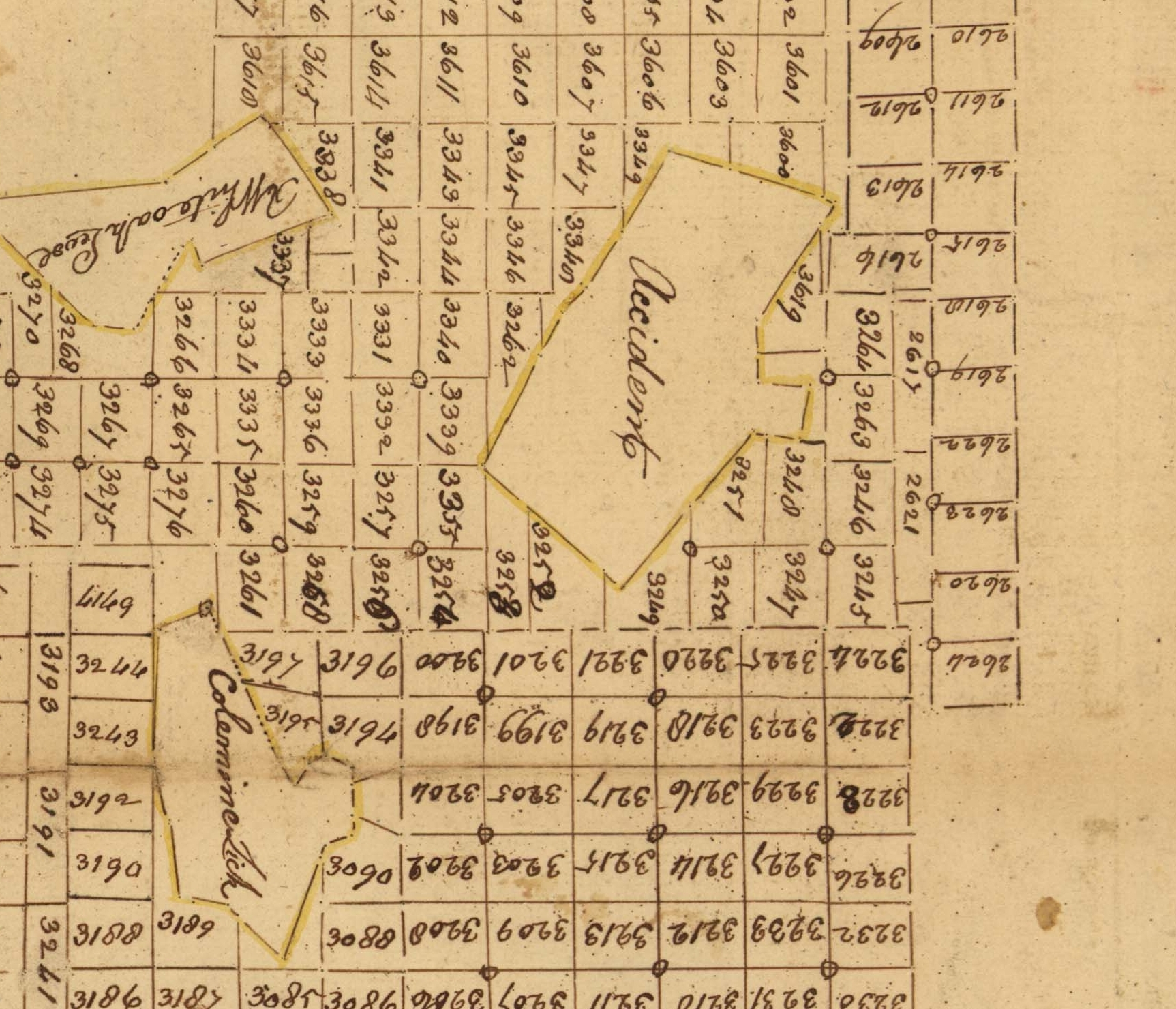
Detail from the original Francis Deakins 1787 survey of lots westward of Fort Cumberland, Library of Congress. Reproduced in Edward C. Papenfuse and Joseph M. Coale, The Maryland State Archives Atlas of Historical Maps of Maryland, (Baltimore: Johns Hopkins University Press, 2003), p. 204

Kaese Mill was listed on the National Register of Historic Places in 1984. The James Drane House was listed in 1985.

== Geography ==
According to the United States Census Bureau, the town has a total area of 0.49 square miles (1.27 km^{2}), all land.

Accident is located in the plateau region of the Appalachian Mountains.

== Demographics ==
Historical population
Census	Pop.	Note	%±
1880	114		—
1940	236		—
1950	242		2.5%
1960	237		−2.1%
1970	237		0.0%
1980	246		3.8%
1990	349		41.9%
2000	353		1.1%
2010	325		−7.9%
2020	338		4.0%
U.S. Decennial Census

=== 2010 census ===
As of the census of 2010, there were 325 people, 141 households, and 86 families residing in the town. The population density was 663.3 inhabitants per square mile (256.1/km^{2}). There were 173 housing units at an average density of 353.1 per square mile (136.3/km^{2}). The racial makeup of the town was 97.8% White, 0.6% Native American, 0.3% Asian, 0.6% from other races, and 0.6% from two or more races. Hispanic or Latino of any race were 0.6% of the population.

There were 141 households, of which 33.3% had children under the age of 18 living with them, 45.4% were married couples living together, 11.3% had a female householder with no husband present, 4.3% had a male householder with no wife present, and 39.0% were non-families. 32.6% of all households were made up of individuals, and 19.1% had someone living alone who was 65 years of age or older. The average household size was 2.30 and the average family size was 2.99.

The median age in the town was 34.5 years. 26.2% of residents were under the age of 18; 10.1% were between the ages of 18 and 24; 25.3% were from 25 to 44; 22.8% were from 45 to 64; and 15.7% were 65 years of age or older. The gender makeup of the town was 45.5% male and 54.5% female.

=== 2000 census ===
As of the census of 2000, there were 353 people, 138 households, and 96 families residing in the town. The population density was 711.1 inhabitants per square mile (274.6/km^{2}). There were 162 housing units at an average density of 326.3 per square mile (126.0/km^{2}). The racial makeup of the town was 99.72% White and 0.28% from two or more races.

There were 138 households, out of which 37.7% had children under the age of 18 living with them, 54.3% were married couples living together, 12.3% had a female householder with no husband present, and 30.4% were non-families. 28.3% of all households were made up of individuals, and 21.7% had someone living alone who was 65 years of age or older. The average household size was 2.56 and the average family size was 3.14.

In the town, the population was spread out, with 29.2% under the age of 18, 7.1% from 18 to 24, 22.4% from 25 to 44, 18.4% from 45 to 64, and 22.9% who were 65 years of age or older. The median age was 38 years. For every 100 females, there were 73.9 males. For every 100 females age 18 and over, there were 73.6 males.

The median income for a household in the town was $22,500, and the median income for a family was $40,556. Males had a median income of $25,250 versus $18,750 for females. The per capita income for the town was $11,950. About 10.9% of families and 17.5% of the population were below the poverty line, including 17.3% of those under age 18 and 24.1% of those age 65 or over.

== Transportation ==
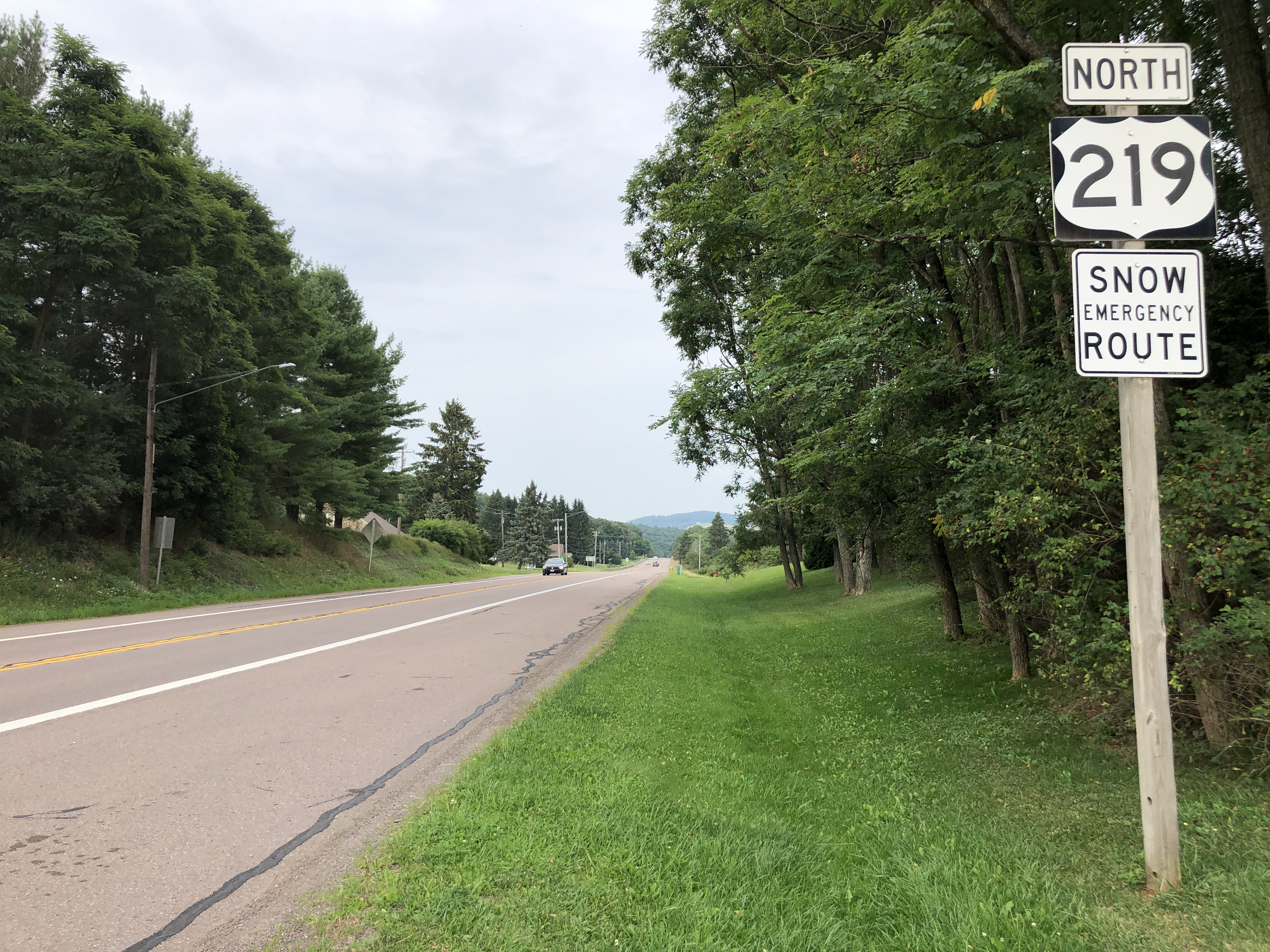
US 219 northbound in Accident

The primary method of transportation to and from Accident is by road. One state-maintained highway, U.S. Route 219, serves the town directly, following Main Street through the middle of Accident. To the north, US 219 connects Accident to Interstate 68 and U.S. Route 40, along with the town of Grantsville, before heading into Pennsylvania. Heading south, US 219 connects to Maryland Route 42, Maryland Route 39, Maryland Route 135 and U.S. Route 50, along with the towns of Oakland and Mountain Lake Park, before it enters West Virginia.

== Notable people ==
- Wendell R. Beitzel, member of Maryland House of Delegates
- James Drane, builder and first owner of the historic Drane House
