= Mountain Lake Park, Maryland =

- Town
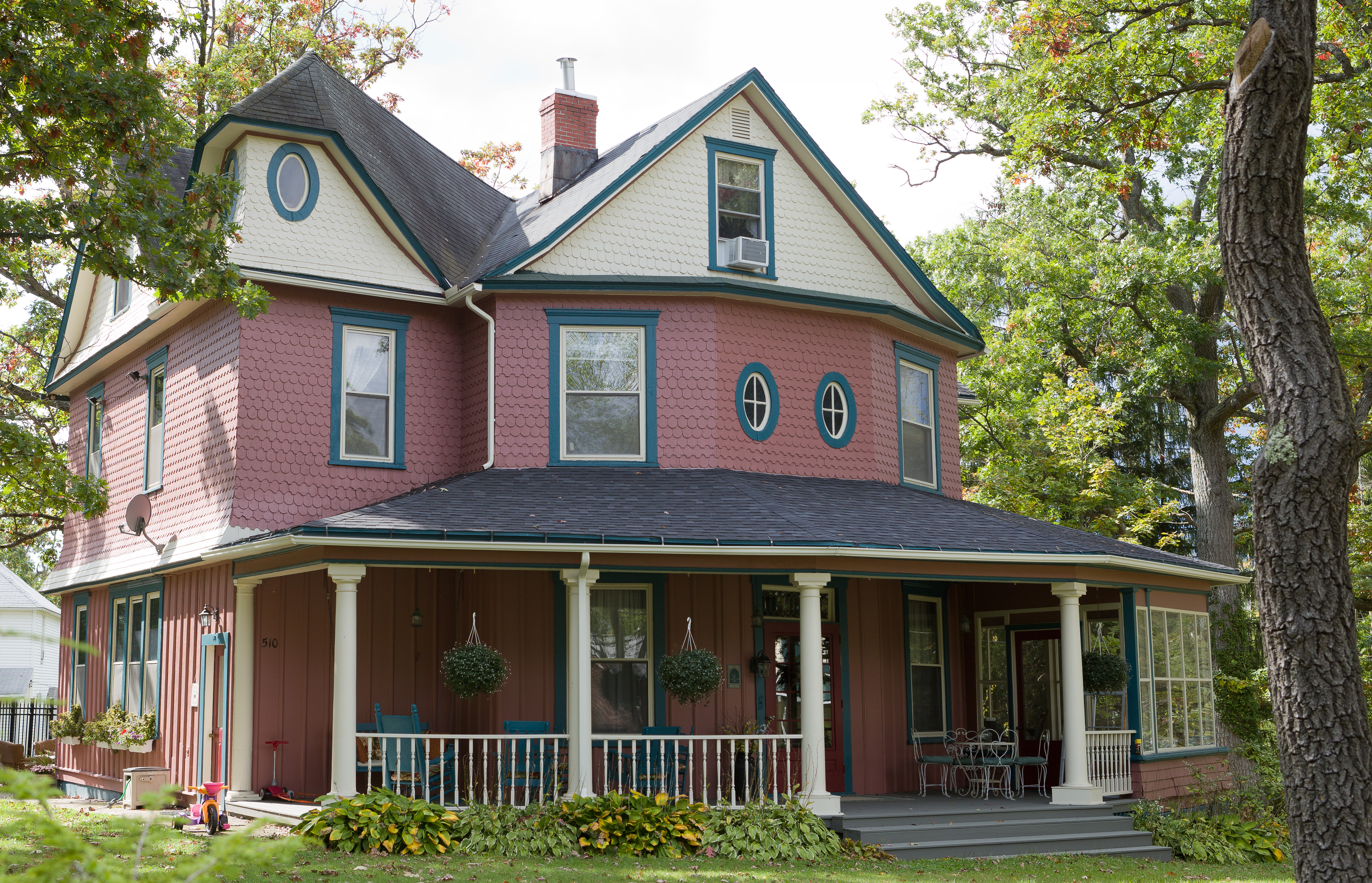
- Creedmore

- Location of Mountain Lake Park, Maryland
- Coordinates: 39°24′06″N 79°22′34″W
- Country: United States
- State: Maryland
- County: Garrett
- Incorporated: 1931

Area
  - Total: 1.98 sq mi (5.14 km^{2})
  - Land: 1.92 sq mi (4.96 km^{2})
  - Water: 0.069 sq mi (0.18 km^{2})
- Elevation: 2,510 ft (770 m)

Population (2020)
  - Total: 2,147
  - Density: 1,121.4/sq mi (432.99/km^{2})
- Time zone: UTC-5 (Eastern (EST))
  - Summer (DST): UTC-4 (EDT)
- ZIP code: 21550
- Area codes: 301, 240
- FIPS code: 24-53800
- GNIS feature ID: 2391319
- Website: Mountain Lake Park

Mountain Lake Park is a town in Garrett County, Maryland, United States. The population was 2,147 as of the 2020 census.

== History ==
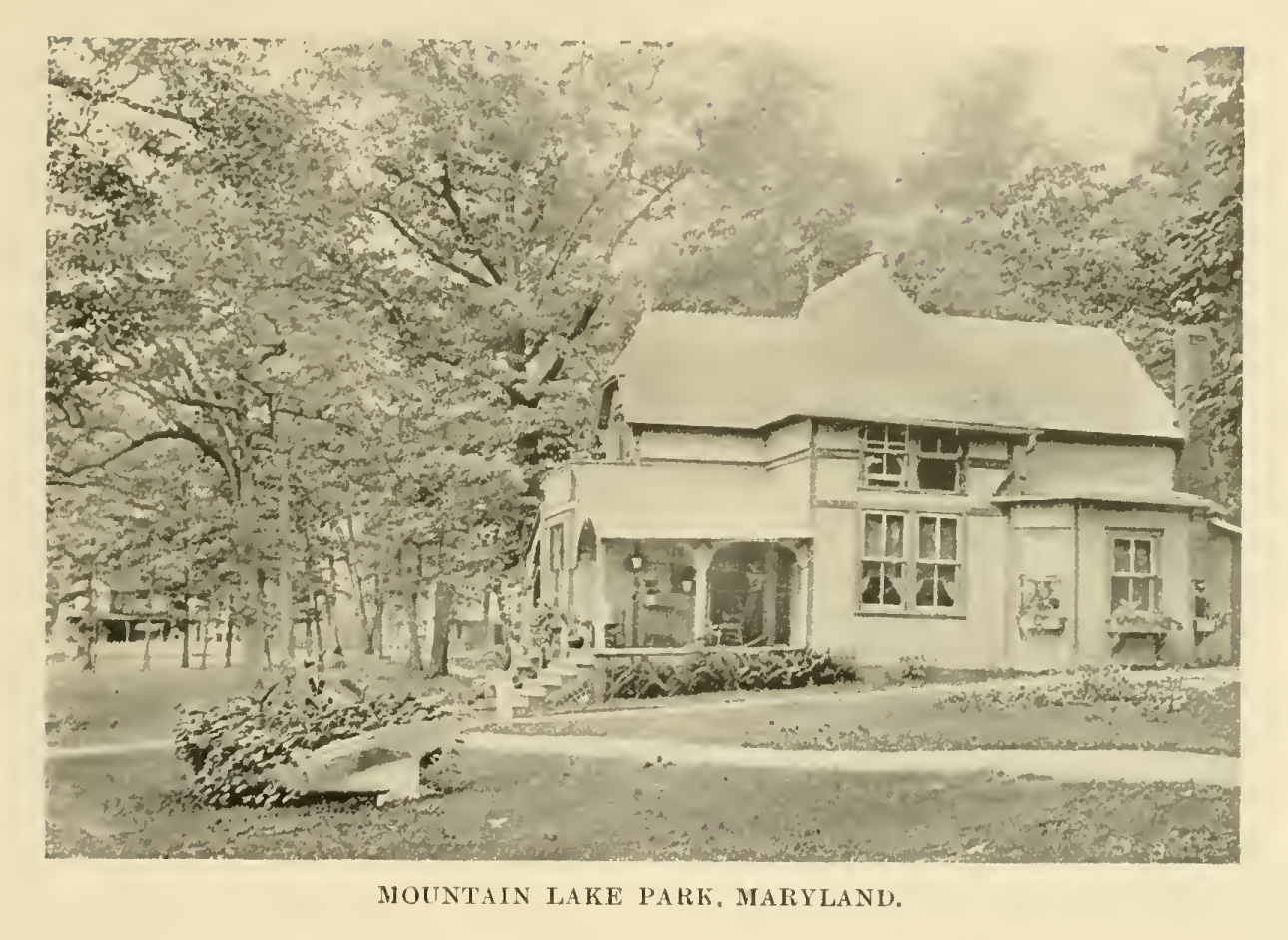
Mountain Lake Park, Maryland, circa 1909

Mountain Lake Park Historic District was listed on the National Register of Historic Places in 1983. Creedmore was listed in 1984.

Mountain Lake Park was founded in 1881 as Maryland's original Chautauqua resort community along the B&O Railroad. Called the Mountain Chautauqua, the summer destination grew to be one of the nation's top destinations over the course of three decades, attracting notable speakers like William Howard Taft and William Jennings Bryan. Benjamin Harrison made a reception stop after getting elected president in 1889. The Railroad Evangelist, Jennie Smith, was a frequent speaker and resident of Mountain Lake Park, where she owned and operated the Grace Hotel. Before becoming internationally known as Carter the Great, the young magician was billed under his given name, Charles Carter.

Over 60 original buildings from the turn of the last century remain in Mountain Lake Park. Cottages and boarding homes were indicative of the community's early years. Due to the variety of rural resort architectural styles, the National Register of Historic Places recognized the district. Many buildings feature porches adorned with scroll-sawn balustrades, cornices, and brackets used in fanciful ways. The original Ticket Office, which accompanied the 5,000-seat Bashford Amphitheater, was refurbished in 2002 and now serves as the town's museum, featuring an extensive display showcasing the town's history. The Amphitheater was razed in the 1940s, with the salvaged lumber used to build several homes.

After visiting Chautauqua, New York, seven business owners and ministers fashioned Mountain Lake Park after the New York model with Christian restrictions attached to each deed. They negotiated to add a depot with B&O Railroad President John Work Garrett, after which the county is named. Among the founders was John Franklin Goucher, who helped found the college in Baltimore that bears his name. Goucher served as the last interim president of the Mountain Lake Park Association before it was sold to the Board of Foreign Missions. The town became incorporated in 1931 and is primarily a residential community.

The original clay tennis courts, which the Women's Civic Club initiated, have been maintained and are still in use today.

== Geography ==
According to the United States Census Bureau, the town has a total area of 2.01 square miles (5.21 km^{2}), of which 1.94 square miles (5.02 km^{2}) is land and 0.07 square miles (0.18 km^{2}) is water.

== Demographics ==
Historical population
Census	Pop.	Note	%±
1900	260		—
1910	335		28.8%
1920	231		−31.0%
1930	322		39.4%
1940	551		71.1%
1950	891		61.7%
1960	975		9.4%
1970	1,263		29.5%
1980	1,670		32.2%
1990	1,938		16.0%
2000	2,248		16.0%
2010	2,092		−6.9%
2020	2,147		2.6%
U.S. Decennial Census

=== 2020 census ===
As of the 2020 census, Mountain Lake Park had a population of 2,147. The median age was 45.6 years. 20.3% of residents were under the age of 18 and 25.1% of residents were 65 years of age or older. For every 100 females there were 85.1 males, and for every 100 females age 18 and over there were 77.5 males age 18 and over.

99.5% of residents lived in urban areas, while 0.5% lived in rural areas.

There were 904 households in Mountain Lake Park, of which 29.5% had children under the age of 18 living in them. Of all households, 39.8% were married-couple households, 15.9% were households with a male householder and no spouse or partner present, and 36.1% were households with a female householder and no spouse or partner present. About 33.0% of all households were made up of individuals and 16.0% had someone living alone who was 65 years of age or older.

There were 999 housing units, of which 9.5% were vacant. The homeowner vacancy rate was 2.9% and the rental vacancy rate was 5.0%.

Racial composition as of the 2020 census
Race	Number	Percent
White	2,032	94.6%
Black or African American	15	0.7%
American Indian and Alaska Native	2	0.1%
Asian	10	0.5%
Native Hawaiian and Other Pacific Islander	1	0.0%
Some other race	7	0.3%
Two or more races	80	3.7%
Hispanic or Latino (of any race)	28	1.3%

=== 2010 census ===
As of the census of 2010, there were 2,092 people, 873 households, and 531 families living in the town. The population density was 1,078.4 inhabitants per square mile (416.4/km^{2}). There were 954 housing units at an average density of 491.8 per square mile (189.9/km^{2}). The racial makeup of the town was 97.8% White, 0.4% African American, 0.1% Native American, 0.3% Asian, and 1.3% from two or more races. Hispanic or Latino of any race were 0.6% of the population.

There were 873 households, of which 30.0% had children under the age of 18 living with them, 43.3% were married couples living together, 14.0% had a female householder with no husband present, 3.6% had a male householder with no wife present, and 39.2% were non-families. 32.4% of all households were made up of individuals, and 15.4% had someone living alone who was 65 years of age or older. The average household size was 2.27, and the average family size was 2.86.

The median age in the town was 44.4 years. 22.1% of residents were under the age of 18; 7.3% were between the ages of 18 and 24; 21.4% were from 25 to 44; 29.2% were from 45 to 64; and 20.1% were 65 years of age or older. The gender makeup of the town was 44.9% male and 55.1% female.

=== 2000 census ===
As of the census of 2000, there were 2,248 people, 867 households, and 578 families living in the town. The population density was 1,485.3 inhabitants per square mile (573.5/km^{2}). There were 948 housing units at an average density of 626.4 per square mile (241.9/km^{2}). The racial makeup of the town was 99.20% White, 0.36% African American, 0.09% Native American, 0.04% Asian, 0.13% Pacific Islander, and 0.18% from two or more races. Hispanic or Latino of any race were 0.76% of the population.

There were 867 households, out of which 35.4% had children under the age of 18 living with them, 49.5% were married couples living together, 14.1% had a female householder with no husband present, and 33.3% were non-families. 30.0% of all households were made up of individuals, and 12.8% had someone living alone who was 65 years of age or older. The average household size was 2.45, and the average family size was 3.02.

In the town, the population was spread out, with 27.4% under the age of 18, 8.1% from 18 to 24, 25.1% from 25 to 44, 20.5% from 45 to 64, and 19.0% who were 65 years of age or older. The median age was 39 years. For every 100 females, there were 85.5 males. For every 100 females age 18 and over, there were 79.3 males.

The median income for a household in the town was $27,917, and the median income for a family was $37,105. Males had a median income of $29,219 versus $23,348 for females. The per capita income for the town was $14,589. About 16.2% of families and 17.9% of the population were below the poverty line, including 17.2% of those under age 18 and 15.2% of those age 65 or over.

== Government ==
Donald W. Sincell is the current mayor of Mountain Lake Park. Sincell was appointed to the position by the town council on July 13, 2017, to replace former Mayor Leo Martin, who died on June 25, 2017. However, but was re-elected posthumously on July 11, 2017.

== Transportation ==
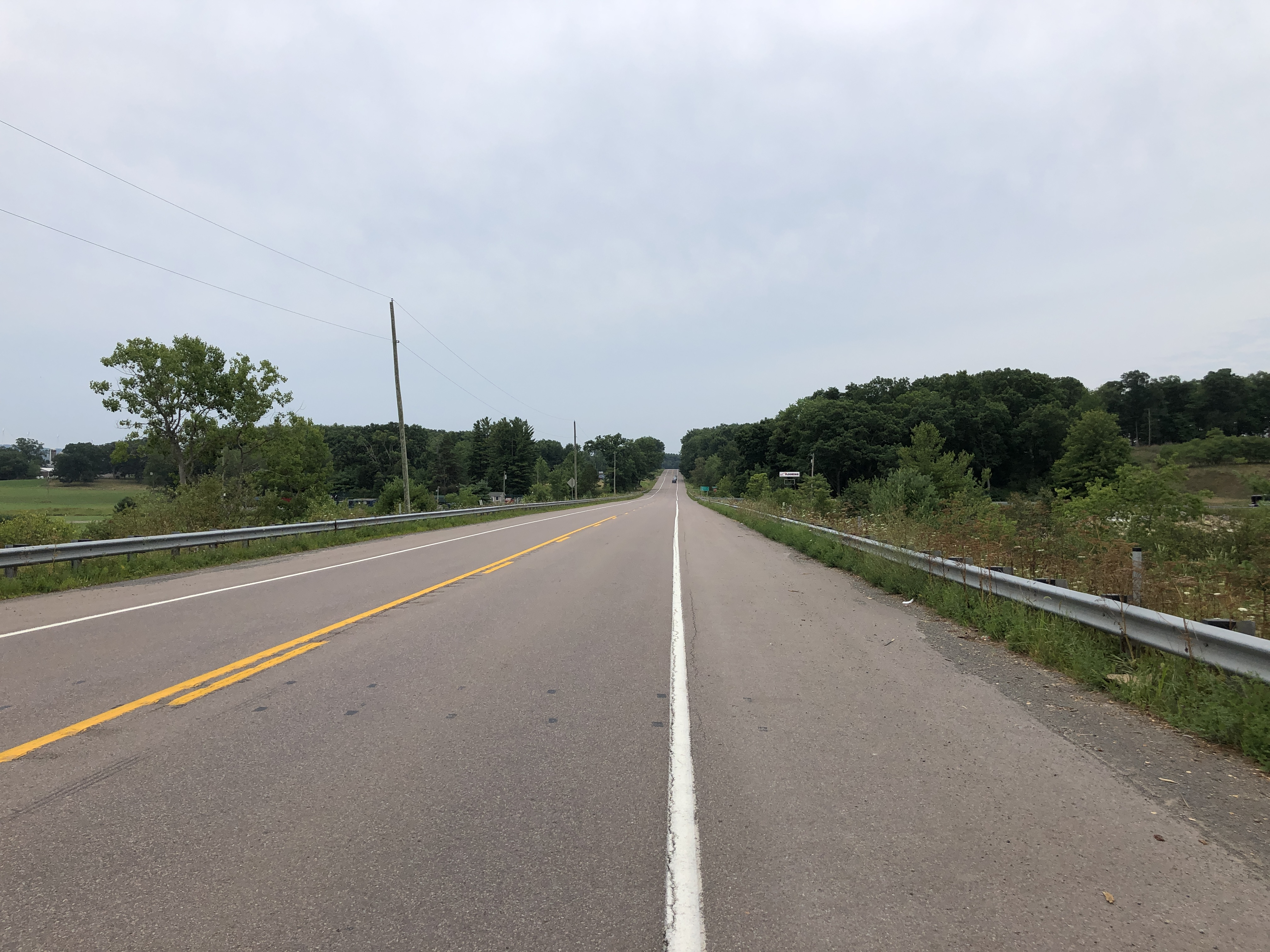
US 219 southbound on the edge of Mountain Lake Park

The primary mode of transportation to and from Mountain Lake Park is by road. Several state-maintained highways serve the town, the most prominent of these being U.S. Route 219. US 219 brushes the western edge of Mountain Lake Park on Garrett Highway on its north–south journey across the region. To the south, US 219 connects to U.S. Route 50 before entering West Virginia. Heading north, US 219 passes through the towns of Oakland, Accident, and Grantsville while having junctions with Maryland Route 39, Maryland Route 42, U.S. Route 40, and Interstate 68 before heading into Pennsylvania. Maryland Route 135 and Maryland Route 560 also serve Mountain Lake Park, with MD 135 providing connections eastward towards Deer Park and Luke, while MD 560 heads south through Loch Lynn Heights to Gorman.
