= Special routes of U.S. Route 219 =

Special routes of U.S. Route 219

Highway system
- United States Numbered Highway System; List; Special; Divided

Several special routes of U.S. Route 219 exist. In order from south to north, these special routes are as follows.

== Chestnut Ridge business loop ==
U.S. Route 219 Business
- Location: High Point, Maryland
- Length: 1.12 mi (1.80 km)
- Existed: 2021–present

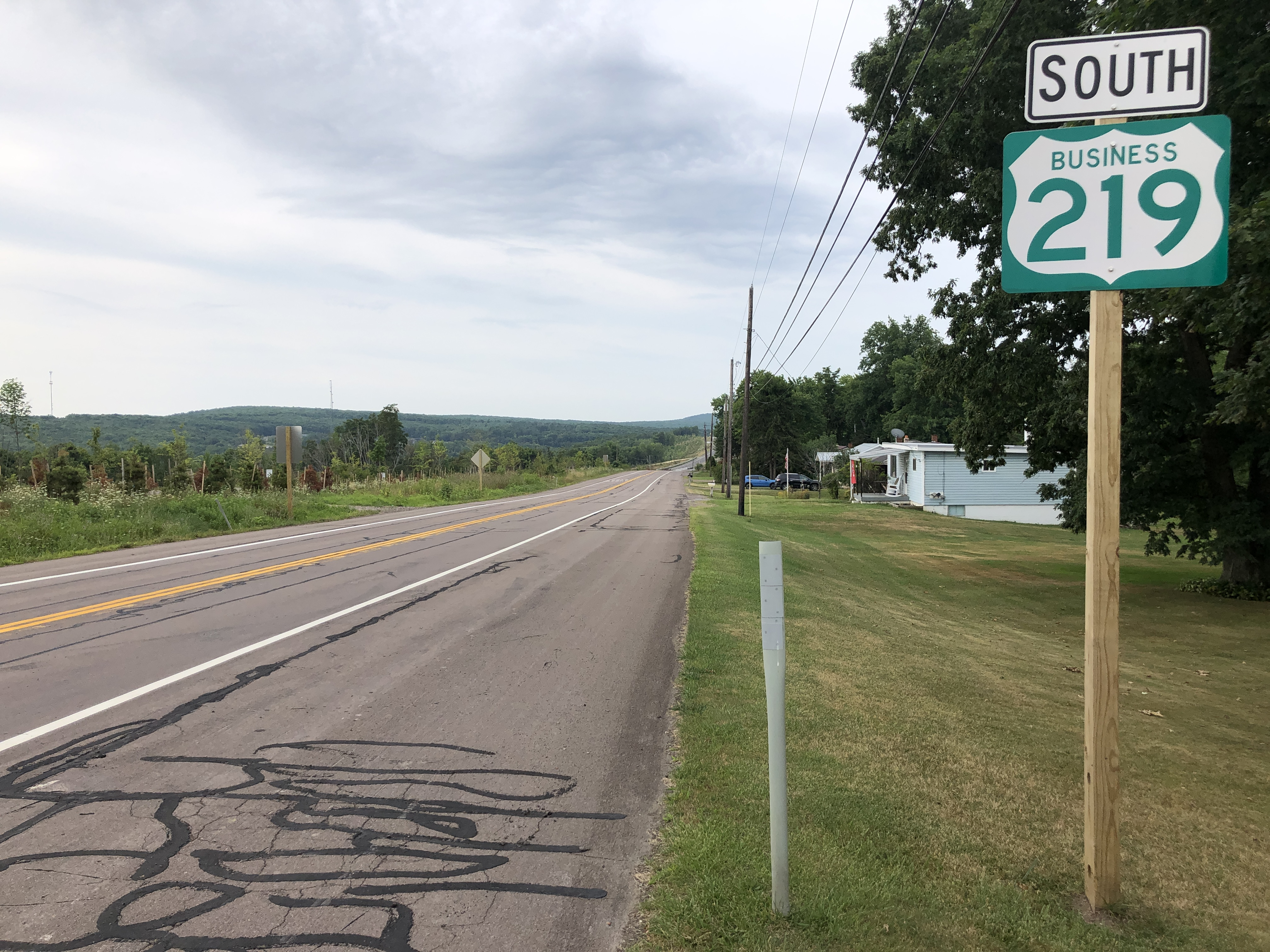
US 219 Bus. southbound past US 219 north of Grantsville

U.S. Route 219 Business is a business route located east of Grantsville, Maryland in High Point that runs 1.12 mi (1.80 km) from a dumbbell interchange with I-68/US 40 and US 219 north to an intersection with US 219, following Chestnut Ridge Road. The route was designated onto the former alignment of US 219 following the opening of a freeway bypass on May 5, 2021.

== Meyersdale business loop ==
U.S. Route 219 Business
- Location: Meyersdale, Pennsylvania
- Existed: 1999–present

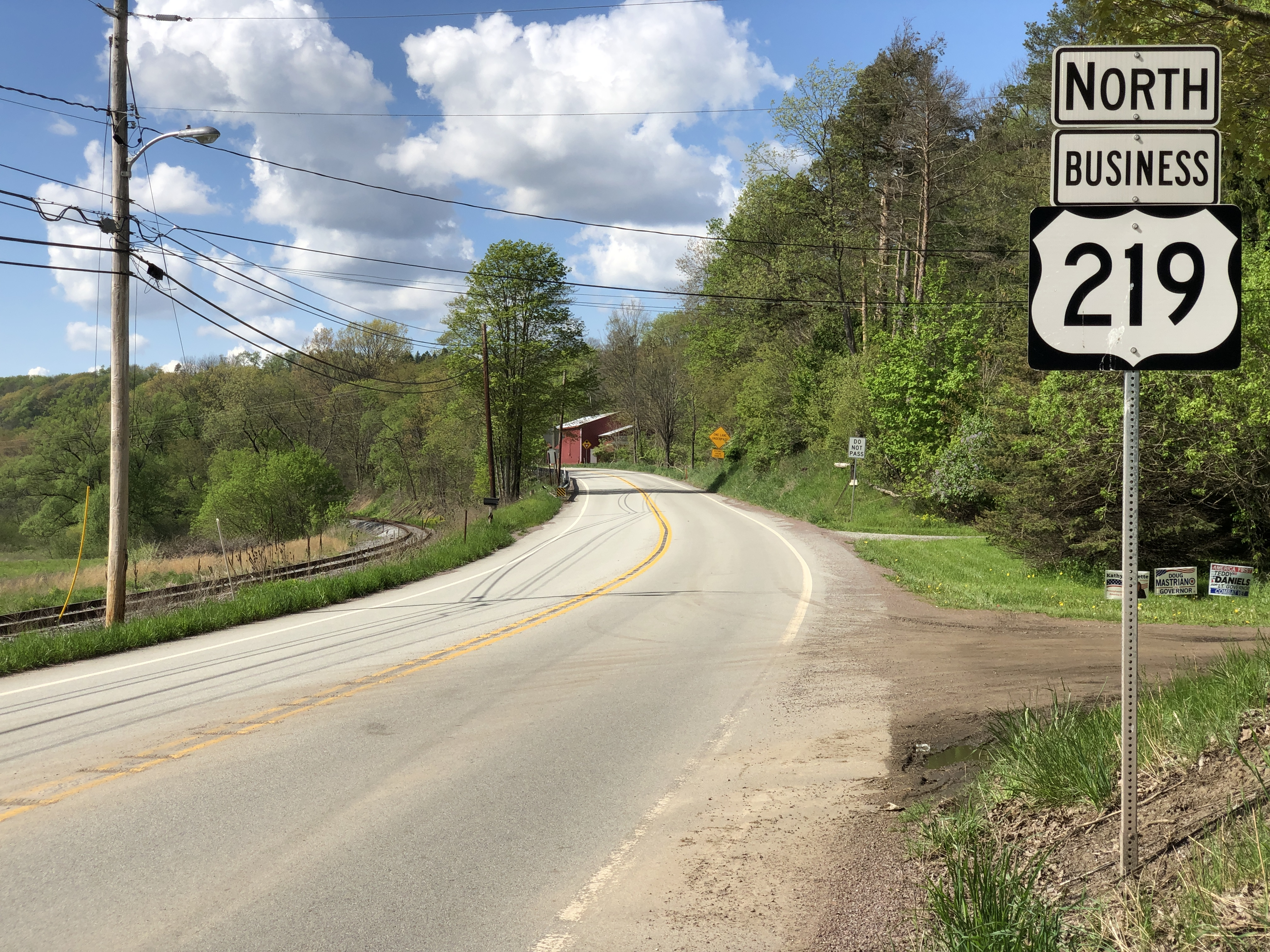
US 219 Bus. northbound in Meyersdale

U.S. Route 219 Business is a business route of U.S. Route 219 that travels for 4 miles through Meyersdale, Pennsylvania. The route was designated after a freeway bypass was constructed around the borough to avoid the variety of turns that the highway previously made through the municipality. The road travels as Beachley Street and Grant Street before becoming a rural road as it reconnects with its parent north of Meyersdale.

== Carrolltown–Mahaffey alternate route ==
U.S. Route 219 Alternate
- Location: Carrolltown–Mahaffey, Pennsylvania

U.S. Route 219 Alternate is a proposed alternate route of US 219 between Carrolltown in Cambria County and Mahaffey in Clearfield County. The route will follow Sunset Road (unsigned SR 4013) and PA 36. The alternate route is being designated in order to increase capacity along the US 219 corridor. Improvements will be made to Sunset Road and PA 36 before US 219 Alt. is designated. The American Association of State Highway and Transportation Officials approved US 219 Alt. in 2009. Designation of the route was expected in 2015 once upgrades were complete, but as of November 2018, the route is not yet posted.

== Ridgway truck route ==
U.S. Route 219 Truck
- Location: Ridgway, Pennsylvania
- Existed: 1990–present

U.S. Route 219 Truck is a controlled-access truck route of U.S. Route 219 that travels for 3 miles around Ridgway, Pennsylvania. The route's main portion is one lane, open only to northbound traffic, to avoid a steep descent into the borough. Traffic is then directed onto a portion of Pennsylvania Route 120 to connect back to the mainline route.

== Salamanca business loop ==
U.S. Route 219 Business
- Location: Salamanca, New York
- Existed: 1990s–present

U.S. Route 219 Business is a business route of US 219 that extends for 7.01 miles (11.28 km) in the vicinity of Salamanca. The southern terminus of the route is at exit 23 of the Southern Tier Expressway (I-86 and NY 17) in Carrollton, where US 219 departs the expressway and follows the right-of-way of US 219 Business south to Pennsylvania. The northern terminus of US 219 Business is at an intersection with US 219 and NY 417 in downtown Salamanca.

From its northern terminus in Salamanca to the hamlet of Bradford Junction, US 219 Business is concurrent to NY 417. The 0.62-mile (1.00 km) segment between the I-86 / NY 17 interchange and NY 417 is designated NY 954T, an unsigned reference route. Until the 1990s, US 219 Business was the routing of US 219 through the Salamanca area.

Major junctions
The entire route is in Cattaraugus County.

Location	mi	km	Destinations	Notes
Carrollton	0.0	0.0	US 219 south – Bradford, PA	
Carrollton	0.0	0.0	I-86 / NY 17 / Southern Tier Expressway / US 219 north – Binghamton, Olean, Salamanca, Erie, PA	
Carrollton	0.7	1.1	NY 417 – Olean	
City of Salamanca	5.9	9.5	US 219 / NY 417 to I-86 / NY 17 – Ellicottville, Buffalo, State Park, Jamestown	
1.000 mi = 1.609 km; 1.000 km = 0.621 mi

== See also ==
- List of special routes of the United States Numbered Highway System
