= Mountain Lake Park Historic District =

Historic district in Maryland, United States

- U.S. National Register of Historic Places
- U.S. Historic district
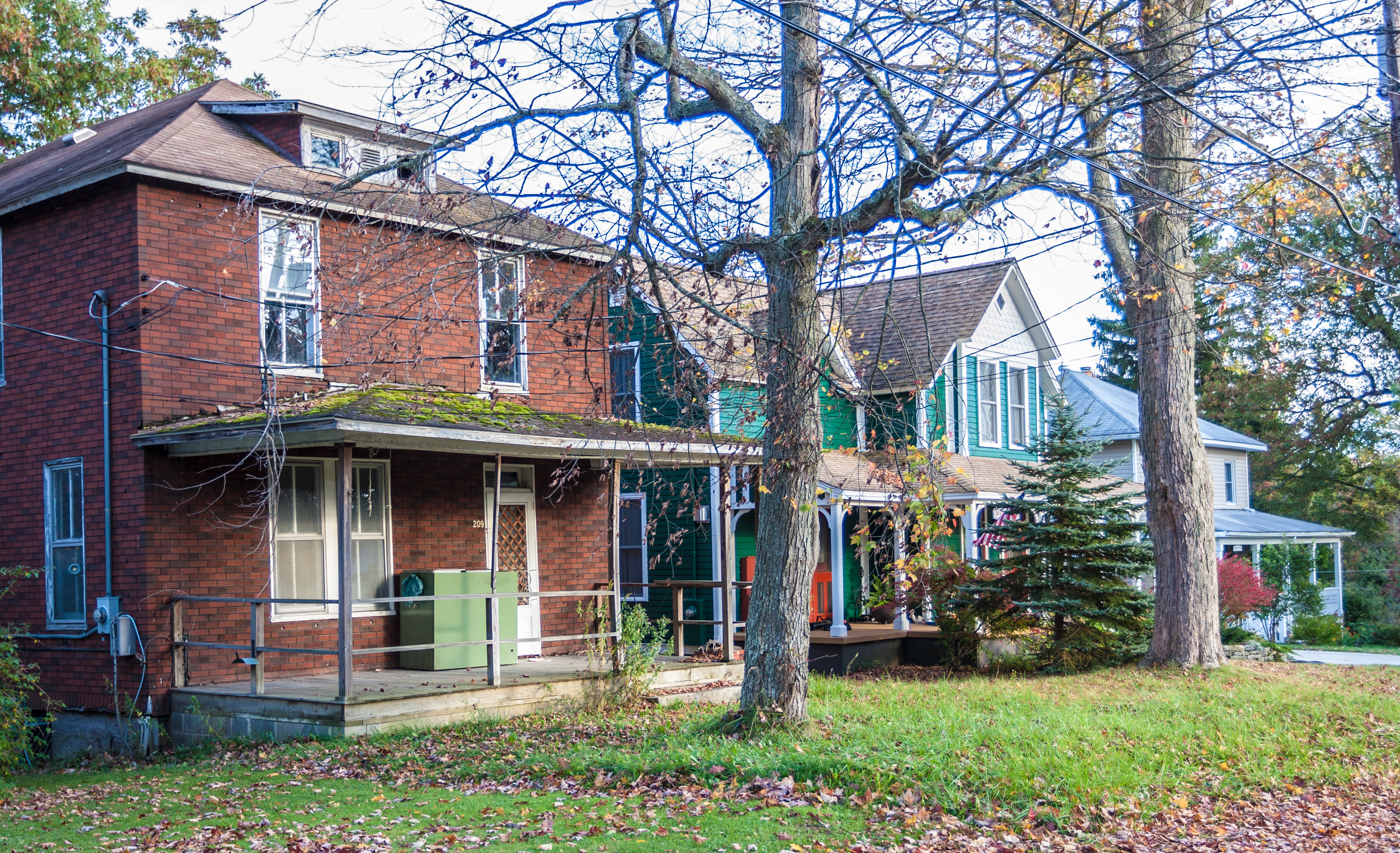
- Some of the homes along H Street

- Location within Maryland Location within the United States
- Location: Roughly bounded by Alleghany Dr., Oakland Ave., D and N Sts., Mountain Lake Park, Maryland
- Coordinates: 39°23′49″N 79°22′53″W
- Area: 110 acres (45 ha)
- Architect: Faul, H. E.
- Architectural style: Gothic, Queen Anne
- NRHP reference No.: 83002948
- Added to NRHP: September 1, 1983

Mountain Lake Park Historic District is a national historic district in Mountain Lake Park, Garrett County, Maryland. It consists of a group of 145 buildings lying within the town, which was launched in the 1880s as a summer resort and important as a center of the Chautauqua movement in Maryland. The district still includes many of the houses built by summer residents of town in the late 19th and early 20th centuries, built in various interpretations of the "Country Gothic" or Rural Queen Anne styles. Also within the district are several of the educational and recreational buildings constructed by the Mountain Lake Park Association, the Methodist-led group which owned and managed the town for many years after its founding in 1881.

It was added to the National Register of Historic Places in 1983.

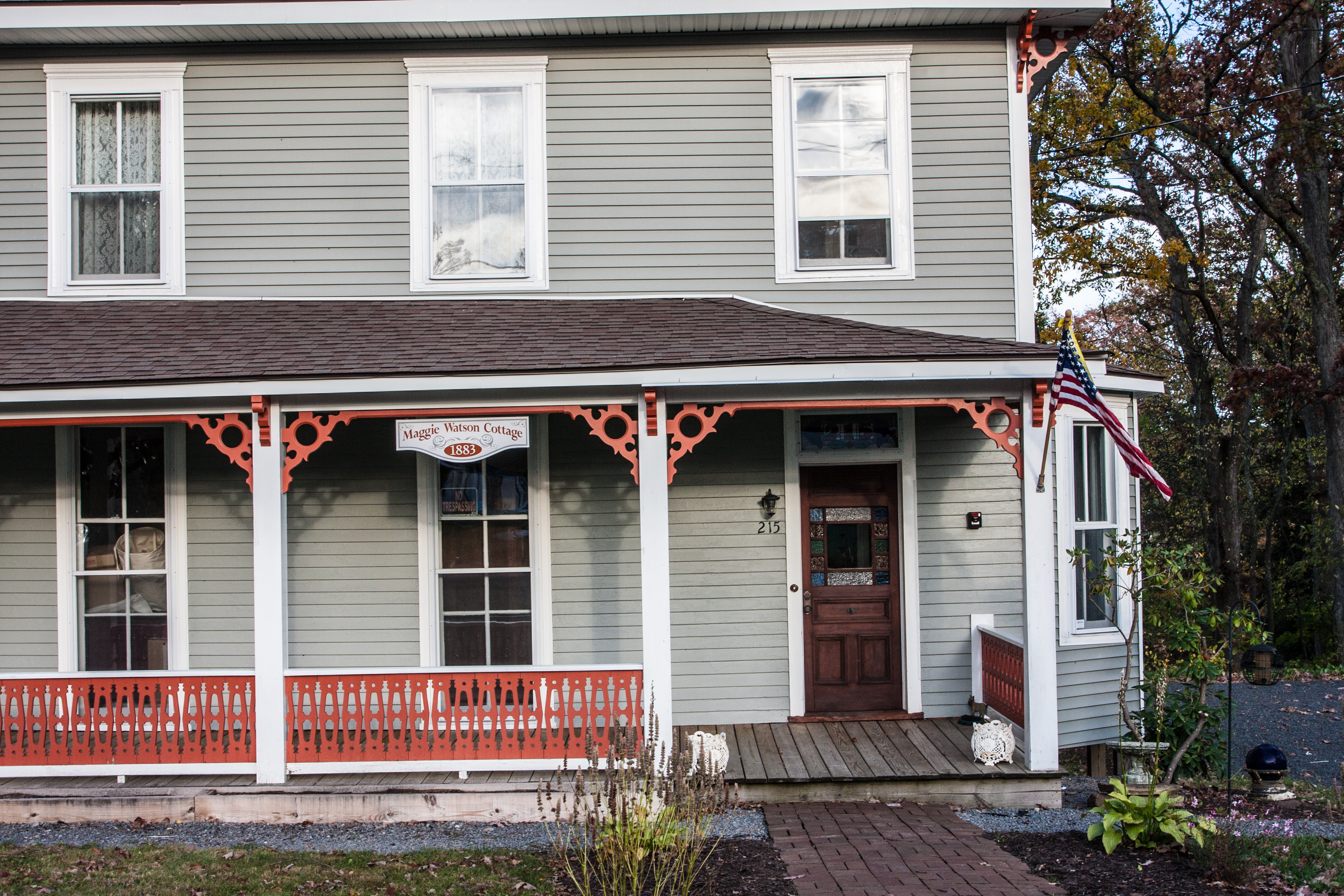
Maggie Watson Cottage - 1883

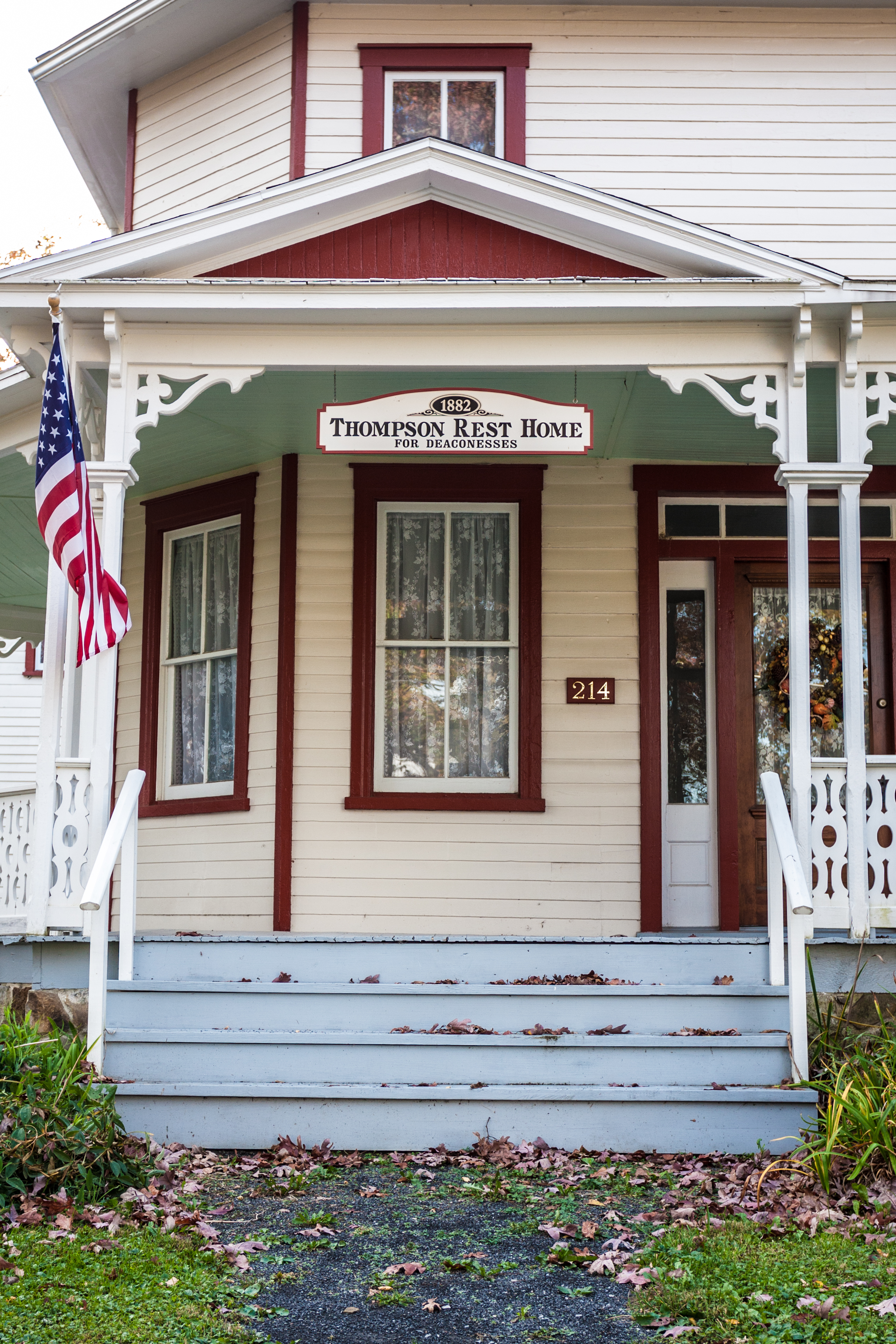
Thompson Rest Home for Deaconesses - 1882
