= Maryland Route 39 =

State highway in Garrett County, Maryland, US

Maryland Route 39
- Maryland Route 39 highlighted in red

Route information
- Maintained by MDSHA
- Length: 6.22 mi (10.01 km)
- Existed: 1927–present

Major junctions
- West end: WV 7 in Hutton
- East end: US 219 in Oakland

Location
- Country: United States
- State: Maryland
- Counties: Garrett

Highway system
- Maryland highway system; Interstate; US; State; Scenic Byways
← MD 38	→ US 40

Maryland Route 39 (MD 39) is a state highway in the U.S. state of Maryland. Known for much of its length as Hutton Road, the state highway begins at the West Virginia state line in Hutton, where the highway continues west as West Virginia Route 7 (WV 7). MD 39, which is the westernmost state-numbered highway in Maryland, runs 6.22 miles (10.01 km) from Hutton east through Crellin to U.S. Route 219 (US 219) in Oakland. The state highway was constructed in the early 1920s.

== Route description ==
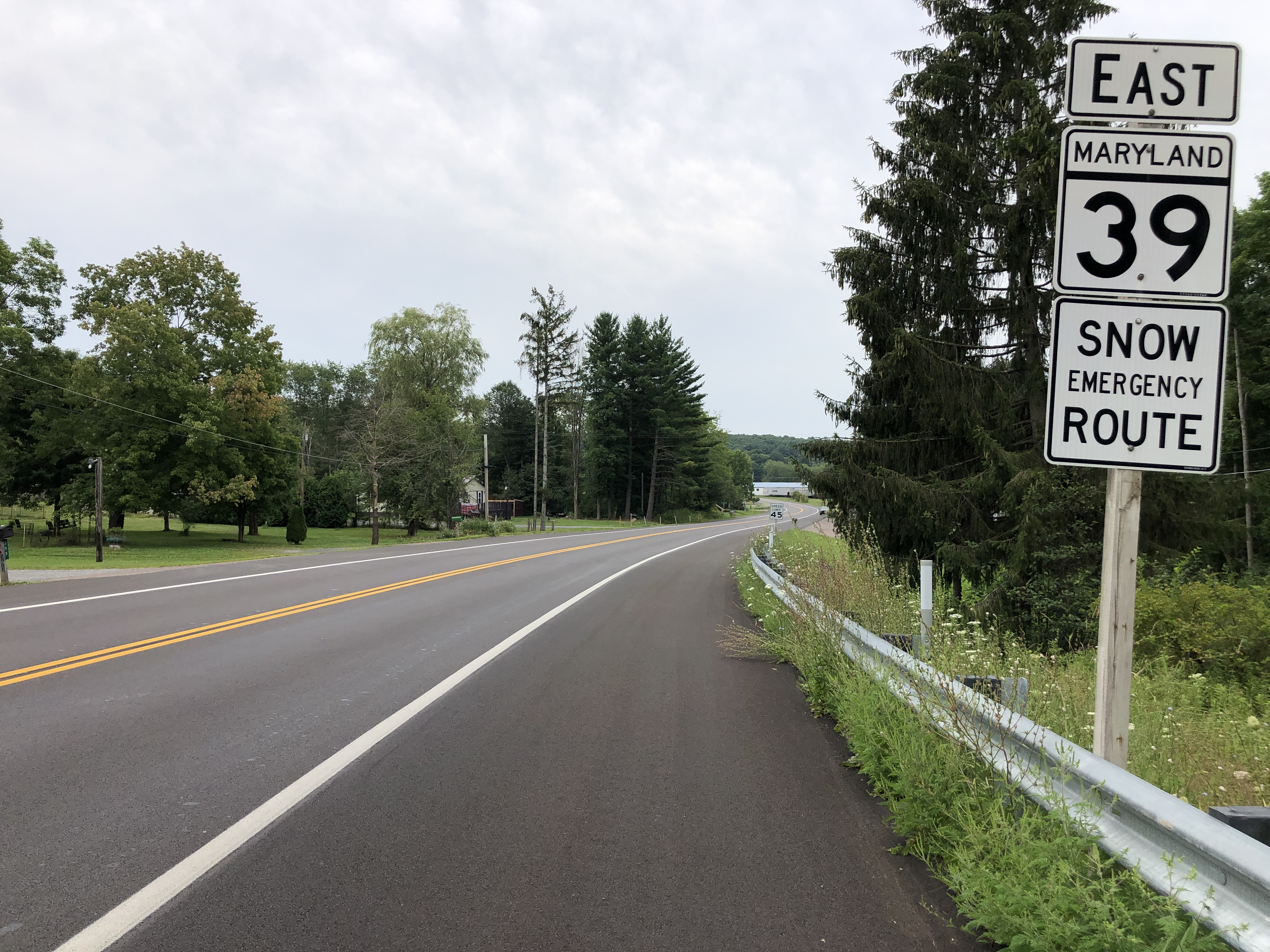
View east along MD 39 past WV 7 at the West Virginia state line in Hutton

MD 39 begins at the West Virginia state line in Hutton to the south of CSX's Mountain Subdivision railroad line which runs parallel to the road. WV 7 continues west from the state line toward Terra Alta. MD 39 heads southeast as two-lane undivided Hutton Road through the village of Hutton. The state highway skirts the hamlet of Crellin before crossing the Youghiogheny River and turning northeast. At Old Crellin Road, MD 39 veers north and enters the town limits of Oakland, where the highway becomes Oak Street. MD 39 curves to the east, then crosses the Little Youghiogheny River into downtown Oakland. After crossing the Mountain Subdivision tracks, the state highway meets its eastern terminus at US 219. US 219 heads north from the intersection as Third Street and east as a continuation of Oak Street.

== History ==
MD 39 was under construction by 1919 between Oakland and Crellin. The highway was completed just east of the Youghiogheny River in 1921. MD 39 was extended across the river through Hutton to the West Virginia state line in 1923.

== Junction list ==
The entire route is in Garrett County.

Location	mi	km	Destinations	Notes
Hutton	0.00	0.00	WV 7 west (Veterans Memorial Highway) – Terra Alta, Morgantown	West Virginia state line; western terminus
Oakland	6.22	10.01	US 219 (Third Street/Oak Street) – Deep Creek Lake, Mountain Lake Park, Red House	Eastern terminus
1.000 mi = 1.609 km; 1.000 km = 0.621 mi

== Auxiliary route ==
MD 39A is an unnamed 0.01-mile (0.016 km) connector between MD 39 and MD 827C in Crellin.
