= Crellin, Maryland =

- Census-designated place
- Location within Maryland Location within the United States
- Coordinates: 39°23′19″N 79°28′07″W
- Country: United States
- State: Maryland
- County: Garrett

Area
  - Total: 0.70 sq mi (1.82 km^{2})
  - Land: 0.70 sq mi (1.82 km^{2})
  - Water: 0 sq mi (0.00 km^{2})
- Elevation: 2,382 ft (726 m)

Population (2020)
  - Total: 210
  - Density: 299/sq mi (115.5/km^{2})
- Time zone: UTC−5 (Eastern (EST))
  - Summer (DST): UTC−4 (EDT)
- ZIP code: 21550
- FIPS code: 24-20500
- GNIS feature ID: 2583602

Crellin is an unincorporated community and census-designated place (CDP) in Garrett County, Maryland, United States, with a population of 264 as of the 2010 census.

Crellin was built as a company town, having been home to a large coal mining and lumber operation at the turn of the 20th century. The Preston Railroad, which had been named for Preston County, West Virginia, which the railroad crossed into several times along its route, was also headquartered in Crellin, but closed down in the late 1950s. While the town survives today, very little remains to show that the original lumbering, mining, and railroad operations ever existed.

Crellin is located in western Garrett County, just 1 mile (1.6 km) east of the Maryland–West Virginia border. The community is in the valley of the Youghiogheny River and is built into a loop of Snowy Creek where the creek joins the Youghiogheny. Maryland Route 39 (Hutton Road) leads east 4 miles (6 km) to Oakland, the Garrett County seat, and northwest 3 miles (5 km) to Corinth, West Virginia. According to the U.S. Census Bureau, the Crellin CDP has an area of 0.70 square miles (1.82 km^{2}), all of it land.

== Demographics ==
Historical population
Census	Pop.	Note	%±
2020	210		—
U.S. Decennial Census
