= Hutton, Maryland =

- Census-designated place
- Location within Maryland Location within the United States
- Coordinates: 39°24′52″N 79°28′48″W
- Country: United States
- State: Maryland
- County: Garrett

Area
  - Total: 0.16 sq mi (0.42 km^{2})
  - Land: 0.16 sq mi (0.42 km^{2})
  - Water: 0 sq mi (0.00 km^{2})
- Elevation: 2,418 ft (737 m)

Population (2020)
  - Total: 87
  - Density: 531.6/sq mi (205.27/km^{2})
- Time zone: UTC-5 (Eastern (EST))
  - Summer (DST): UTC-4 (EDT)
- ZIP code: 21550
- FIPS code: 24-41175
- GNIS feature ID: 2583637

Hutton is an unincorporated community and census-designated place (CDP) in Garrett County, Maryland, United States.

The population was 86 at the 2010 census, which was up from a population of 29 recorded in the 2000 census.

Hutton is located on Maryland Route 39 adjacent to the West Virginia border. MD 39 leads east 6 miles (10 km) to Oakland, the Garrett County seat, and West Virginia Route 7 leads northwest from the state line 4 miles (6 km) to Terra Alta, West Virginia.

The Hutton CDP has an area of 0.17 square miles (0.44 km^{2}), all of it land. The community is in the valley of Snowy Creek, a southeast-flowing tributary of the Youghiogheny River.

== Demographics ==
Historical population
Census	Pop.	Note	%±
2020	87		—
U.S. Decennial Census
