= Redhouse, Maryland =

Unincorporated community in Maryland, United States

- Unincorporated community
- Location within Maryland Location within the United States
- Coordinates: 39°18.5′N 79°27.2′W
- Country: United States
- State: Maryland
- County: Garrett
- Elevation: 2,543 ft (775 m)
- Time zone: UTC-5 (Eastern (EST))
  - Summer (DST): UTC-4 (EDT)
- Area codes: 301, 240
- GNIS feature ID: 586795

Redhouse is an unincorporated community in Garrett County, Maryland, United States, located at the intersection of U.S. Route 50 and U.S. Route 219 near the West Virginia state line.
