= James Drane House =

Historic house in Maryland, United States

- U.S. National Register of Historic Places
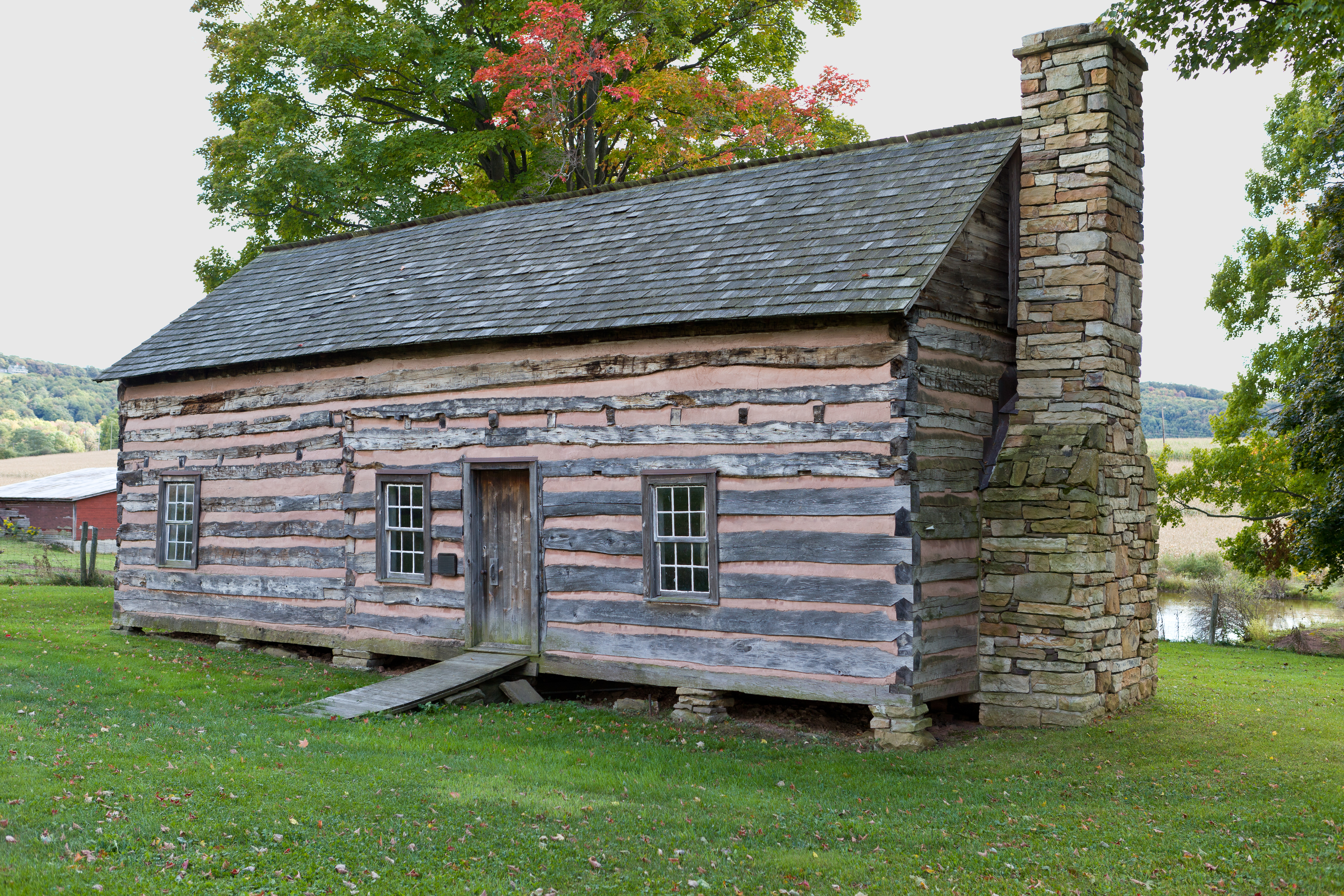

- Location within Maryland Location within the United States
- Location: Accident-Bittinger Rd., Accident, Maryland
- Coordinates: 39°37′45″N 79°18′47″W
- Area: 5 acres (2.0 ha)
- Built: c. 1800
- Built by: Drane, James
- NRHP reference No.: 85000059
- Added to NRHP: January 11, 1985

The James Drane House is a historic house located in Accident, Garrett County, Maryland, United States.

== Description and history ==
The house is a 1 1/2-story, long rectangular log-and-frame structure with a pitched gable roof and an exterior stone chimney. A small cemetery about 100 yards to the north marks the site of Zion Lutheran Church (dedicated in 1851) and includes a simple brown fieldstone headstone marked "J.D. June 27, 1828." The house was constructed in 1798 by William Lamar and given to his sister Priscilla and husband James Drane, the first permanent settler in the Accident area. In the late 1980s the house was stabilized and restored through the efforts of the Town of Accident and numerous local volunteers.

The house was listed on the National Register of Historic Places on January 11, 1985.
