= Creedmore (Mountain Lake Park, Maryland) =

Historic house in Maryland, United States

- U.S. National Register of Historic Places
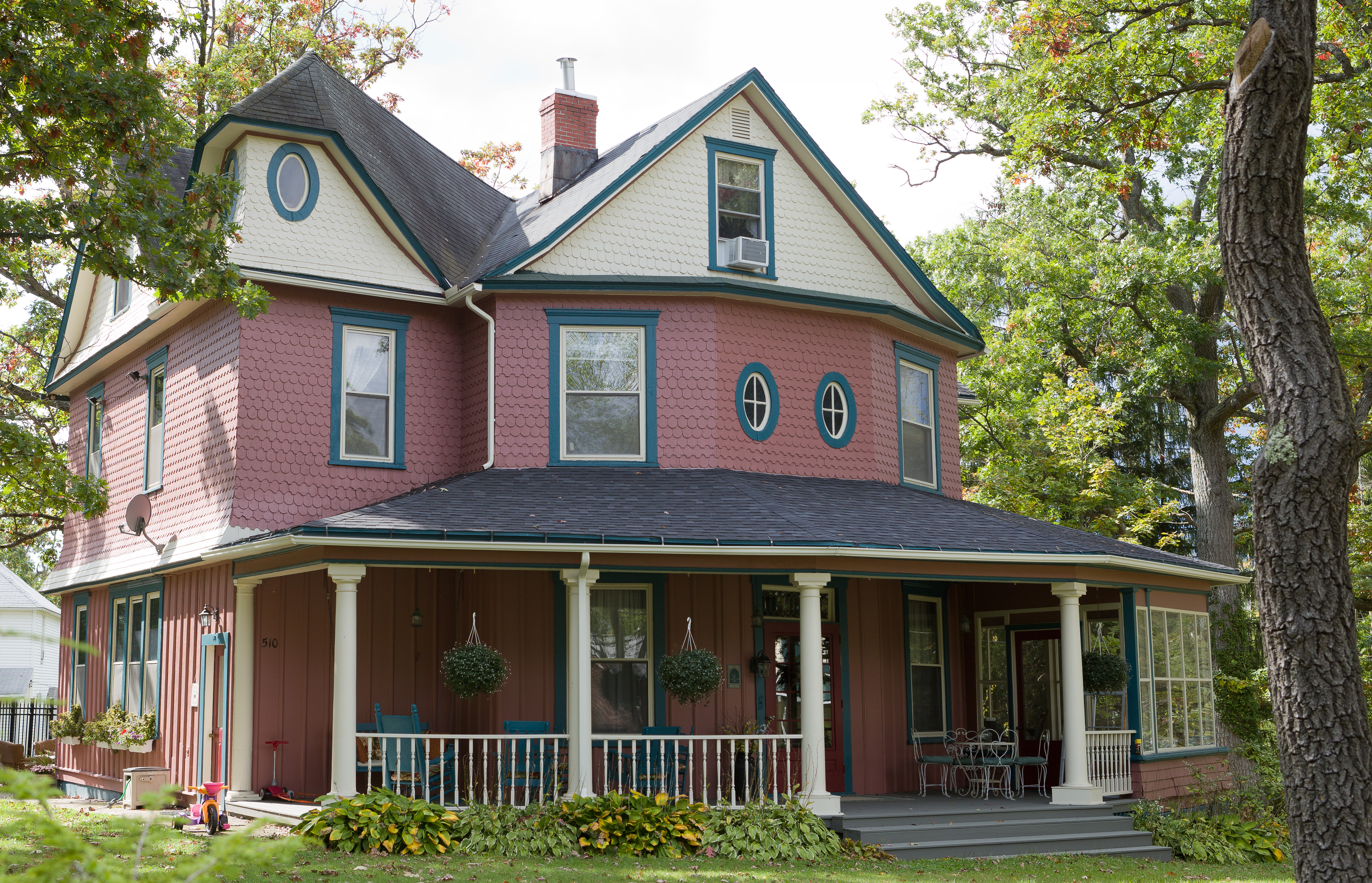

- Location within Maryland Location within the United States
- Location: 510 G St., Mountain Lake Park, Maryland
- Coordinates: 39°23′59″N 79°22′59″W
- Built: 1903
- Architect: Collins, Creed
- Architectural style: Queen Anne
- NRHP reference No.: 84000505
- Added to NRHP: December 27, 1984

Creedmore is a historic home located at Mountain Lake Park, Garrett County, Maryland, United States. It is a large 2 1/2-story frame house built in the Queen Anne style. The house was built in 1903–1904 and features many distinctive architectural elements, including oval windows, an unusual roofline, and extensive shingling. It was constructed originally as a summer residence.

Creedmore was listed on the National Register of Historic Places in 1984.
