= Maryland Route 42 =

State highway in Garrett County, Maryland, US, known as Friendsville Road

Maryland Route 42
- Friendsville Road
- Maryland Route 42 highlighted in red

Route information
- Maintained by MDSHA
- Length: 15.06 mi (24.24 km)
- Existed: 1927–present
- Tourist routes: Mountain Maryland Scenic Byway

Major junctions
- South end: US 219 near McHenry
- I-68 in Friendsville
- North end: SR 2013 near Asher Glade

Location
- Country: United States
- State: Maryland
- Counties: Garrett

Highway system
- Maryland highway system; Interstate; US; State; Scenic Byways
← MD 41	→ MD 43

Maryland Route 42 (MD 42) is a state highway in the U.S. state of Maryland. Known as Friendsville Road, the state highway runs 15.06 miles (24.24 km) from U.S. Route 219 (US 219) near McHenry north to the Pennsylvania state line near Asher Glade, where the highway continues as State Route 2013 (SR 2013) in Fayette County toward Pennsylvania Route 281 (PA 281) in Markleysburg. MD 42 provides the most direct route between Friendsville and southern Garrett County. The state highway was constructed as a modern highway from Friendsville to north of Accident in the early 1920s. The remainder of the highway through Asher Glade was completed in the early 1930s. The southern terminus was shifted from Accident to McHenry in 1960.

== Route description ==
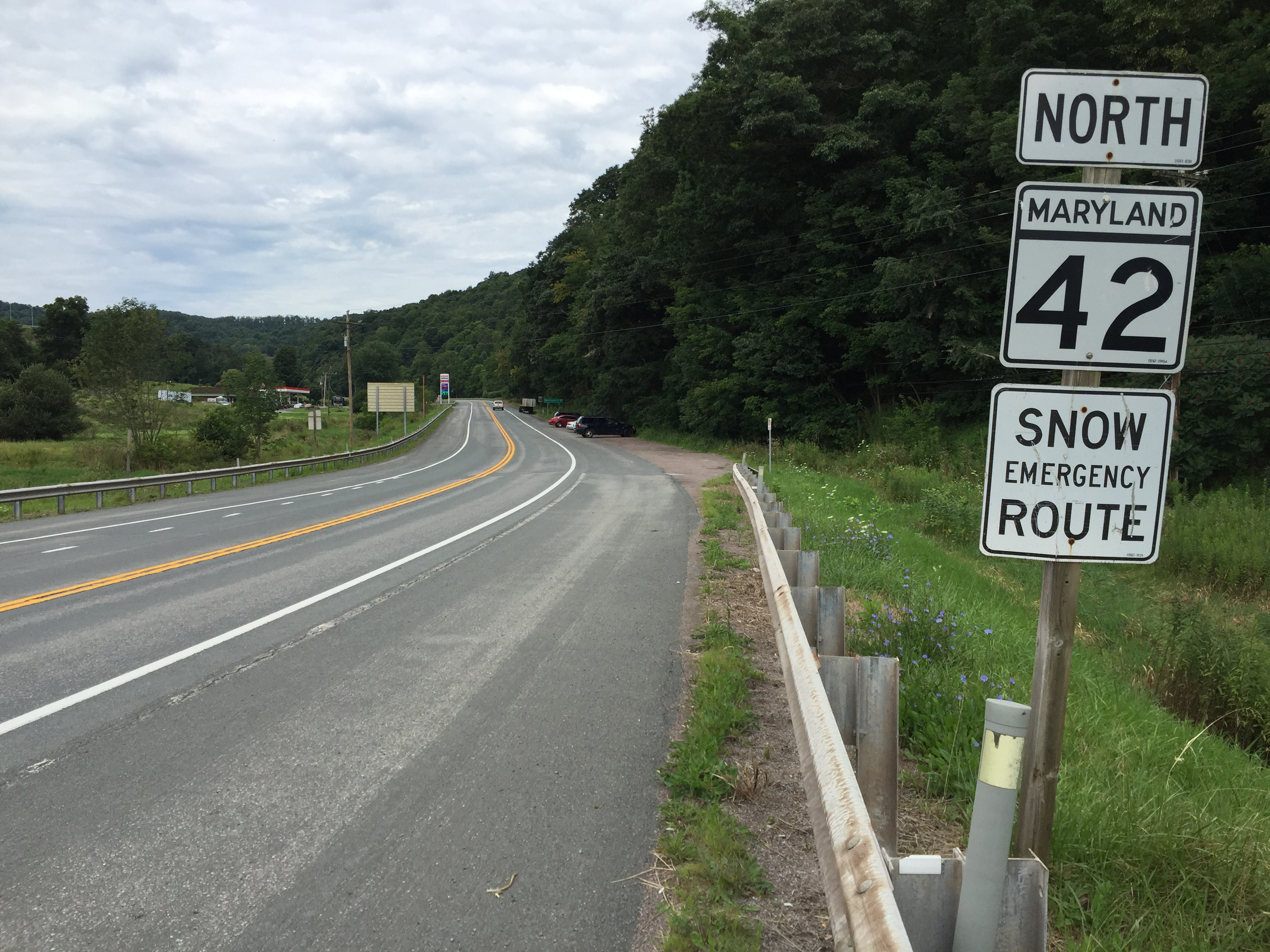
View north along MD 42 at I-68 near Friendsville

MD 42 begins at a tangent intersection with US 219 (Garrett Highway) at the northern edge of McHenry near Deep Creek Lake. The state highway heads north as a two-lane undivided road. After meeting Hoyes Sang Run Road in the hamlet of Hoyes, MD 42 curves west then north again through farmland. The state highway features a pull-off for trucks to check their brakes before starting a descent with grades of up to 8%. The uphill direction has a climbing lane for part of the ascent. At the bottom of the hill, MD 42 enters the town of Friendsville and turns west. First Avenue, which is unsigned MD 742, heads north into the center of Friendsville while MD 42 bypasses the town center to the south and west.

After crossing the Youghiogheny River, MD 42 turns northwest and meets Interstate 68 (I-68) at a diamond interchange. The entrance ramp from MD 42 to westbound I-68 forms the fourth leg of the intersection with the other end of MD 742, Maple Street, which receives the exit ramp from westbound I-68. MD 42 heads west up a creek valley to an intersection with Blooming Rose Road, then turns north and crosses Buffalo Run. Shortly after crossing Laurel Run and Glade Run, the state highway passes through the unincorporated community of Asher Glade before the highway reaches its northern terminus at the Pennsylvania state line. The road continues north as SR 2013 (Friendsville Road) toward the borough of Markleysburg, where the highway meets PA 281.

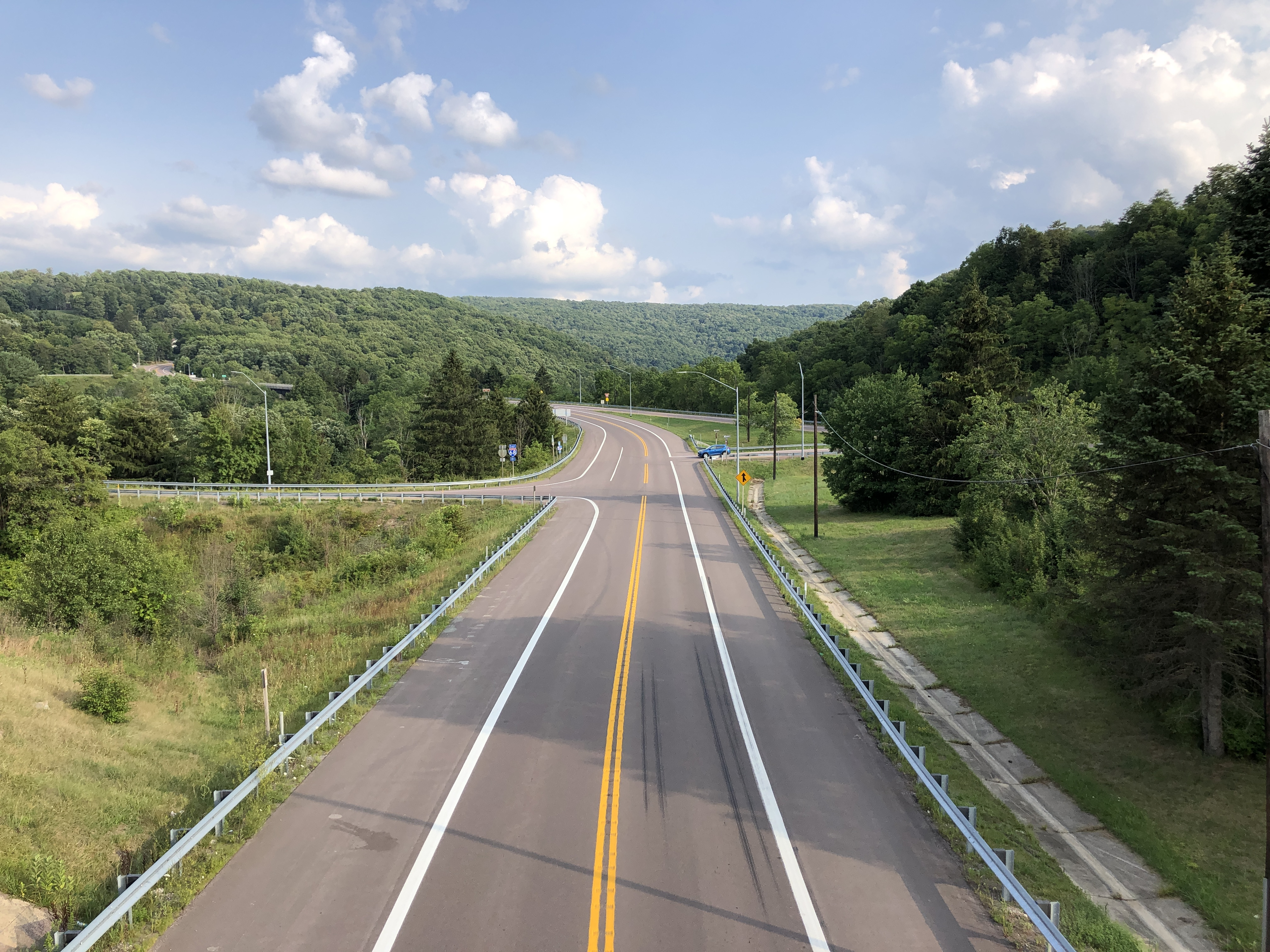
MD 42 southbound at I-68 in Friendsville

== History ==
MD 42 originally connected Friendsville with US 219 north of Accident via Bear Creek Road instead of the current connection near McHenry. The state highway was paved for about 3 miles (4.8 km) east of Friendsville in 1921. The highway was complete to present day US 219 at the hamlet of Kaese Mill north of Accident in 1923. The first section of MD 42 from Friendsville to the Pennsylvania state line was completed in 1928 from the west side of the Youghiogheny River to Blooming Rose Road. The modern Maple Street bridge over the Youghiogheny River was built in 1932. Construction of MD 42 from Blooming Rose Road to the state line began in 1932 and was completed in 1935. MD 42 was transferred from its eastern terminus near Accident to a southern terminus near McHenry, following First Street north to Maple Street within Friendsville, in 1960. The state highway originally followed Hoyes Road east from the crossroads in Hoyes to US 219 north of the present terminus. MD 42 was shifted to its present terminus south of Hoyes around 1972. The state highway was relocated in Friendsville to connect with its interchange with I-68 in 1975; First Street and Maple Street through Friendsville were designated MD 742.

== Junction list ==
The entire route is in Garrett County.

Location	mi	km	Destinations	Notes
McHenry	0.00	0.00	US 219 (Garrett Highway) – Oakland, Accident	Southern terminus
Friendsville	7.27	11.70	MD 742 north (First Avenue)	Southern terminus of MD 742
Friendsville	7.67	12.34	I-68 (National Freeway) – Cumberland, Morgantown	I-68 Exit 4
Friendsville	7.83	12.60	MD 742 south (Maple Avenue)	Northern terminus of MD 742
Asher Glade	15.06	24.24	SR 2013 (Friendsville Road) to PA 281 – Markleysburg	Pennsylvania state line; northern terminus
1.000 mi = 1.609 km; 1.000 km = 0.621 mi

== Auxiliary route ==
MD 42A is a 0.02-mile (0.032 km) connector between MD 42 and MD 828A near Blooming Rose Road west of Friendsville.
