= Kaese Mill =

- U.S. National Register of Historic Places
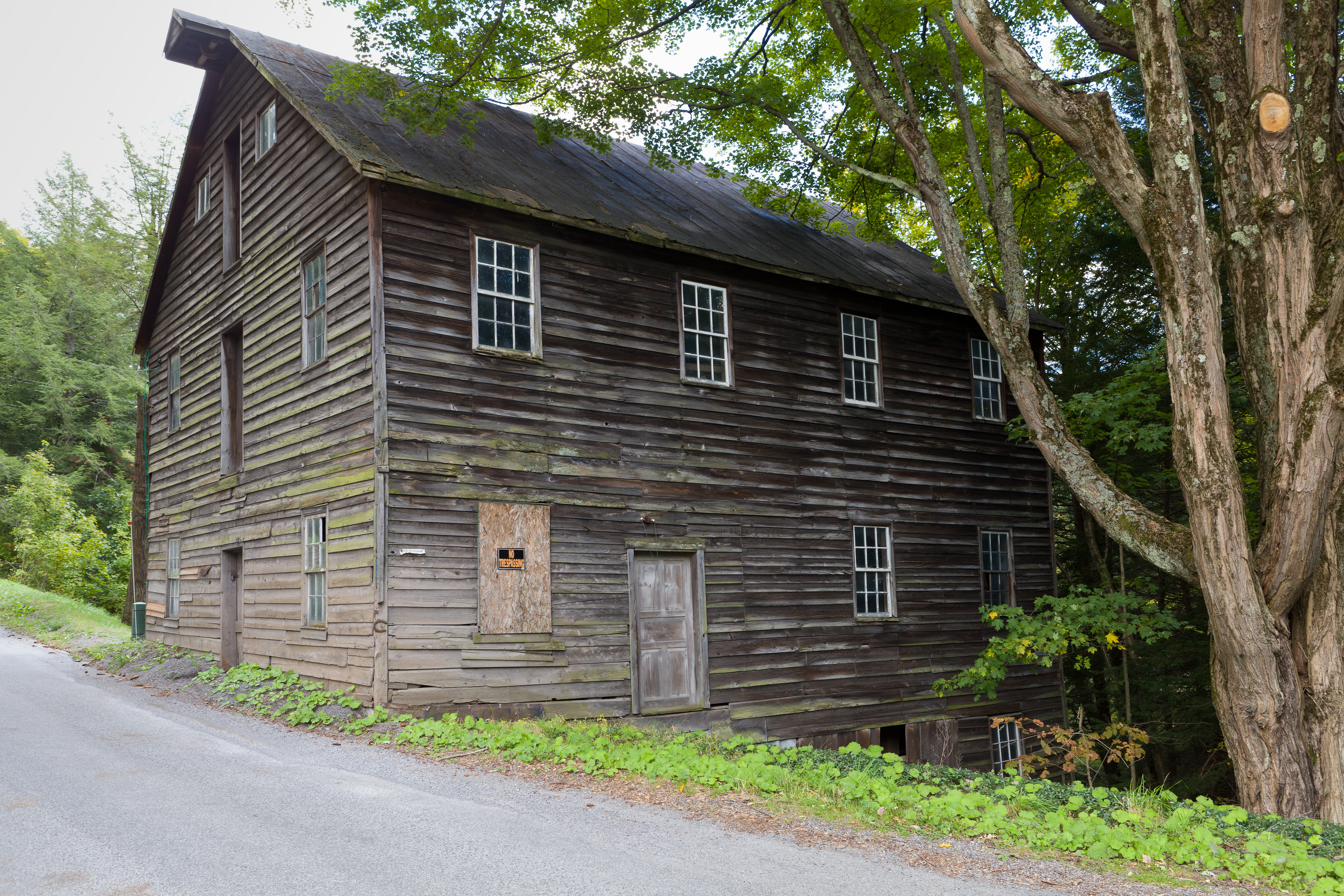

- Location within Maryland Location within the United States
- Nearest city: Accident, Maryland
- Coordinates: 39°39′2″N 79°17′49″W
- Area: 7 acres (2.8 ha)
- Built: 1868
- Built by: Kaese, Henry August, Sr.
- NRHP reference No.: 84001782
- Added to NRHP: September 13, 1984

Kaese Mill is a historic grist mill located at Accident, Garrett County, Maryland, United States. It was constructed about 1868, and is a 2 1/2-story frame water-powered grist mill. It is the only fully operational water-powered grist mill in Maryland. It was built by Henry August Kaese, Sr., an immigrant miller from Germany who settled in Garrett County shortly after the American Civil War.

Kaese Mill was listed on the National Register of Historic Places in 1984.
