= Friendsville, Maryland =

- Town
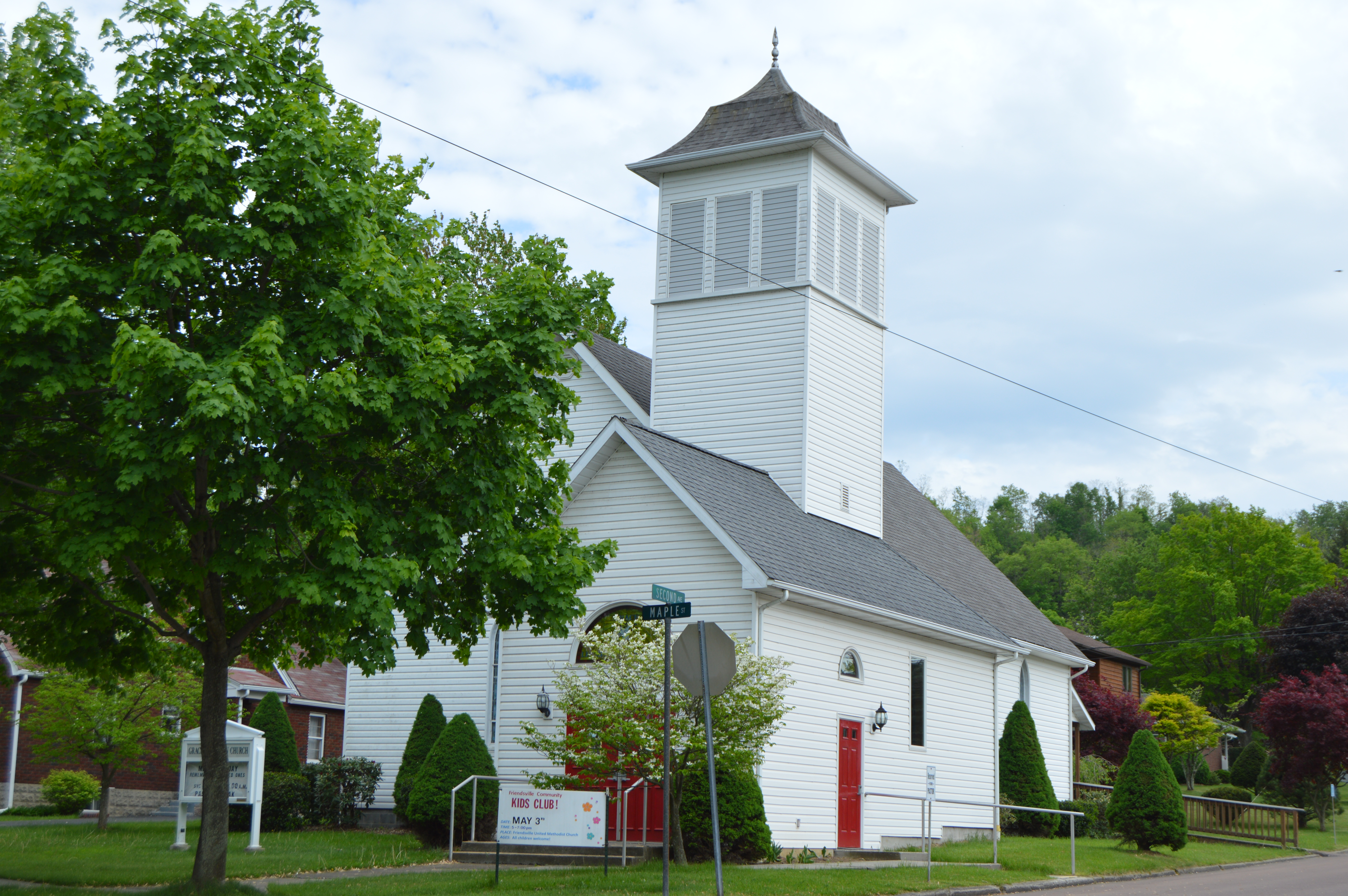
- Grace Lutheran Church

- Flag Seal

- Coordinates: 39°39′45″N 79°24′16″W
- Country: United States
- State: Maryland
- County: Garrett
- Incorporated: 1902

Area
  - Total: 1.00 sq mi (2.59 km^{2})
  - Land: 1.00 sq mi (2.59 km^{2})
  - Water: 0 sq mi (0.00 km^{2})
- Elevation: 1,522 ft (464 m)

Population (2020)
  - Total: 438
  - Density: 438.2/sq mi (169.18/km^{2})
- Time zone: UTC-5 (Eastern (EST))
  - Summer (DST): UTC-4 (EDT)
- ZIP code: 21531
- Area codes: 301, 240
- FIPS code: 24-30850
- GNIS feature ID: 2390193
- Website: www.friendsville.org

Friendsville is a town in Garrett County, Maryland, United States. The population was 438 at the 2020 census.

== Geography ==
According to the United States Census Bureau, the town has a total area of 0.91 square miles (2.36 km^{2}), all land. The Youghiogheny River flows through the town and is renowned by the whitewater kayaking/rafting community as the take-out for the famous Upper Yough run.

== History ==
Friendsville is named after its first European settler, John Friend, who came to what is now Garrett County before the American Revolution. Many of Friend's descendants live in Garrett County today, and the headquarters and library of the Friend Family Association are located in Friendsville due to this connection.

== Transportation ==
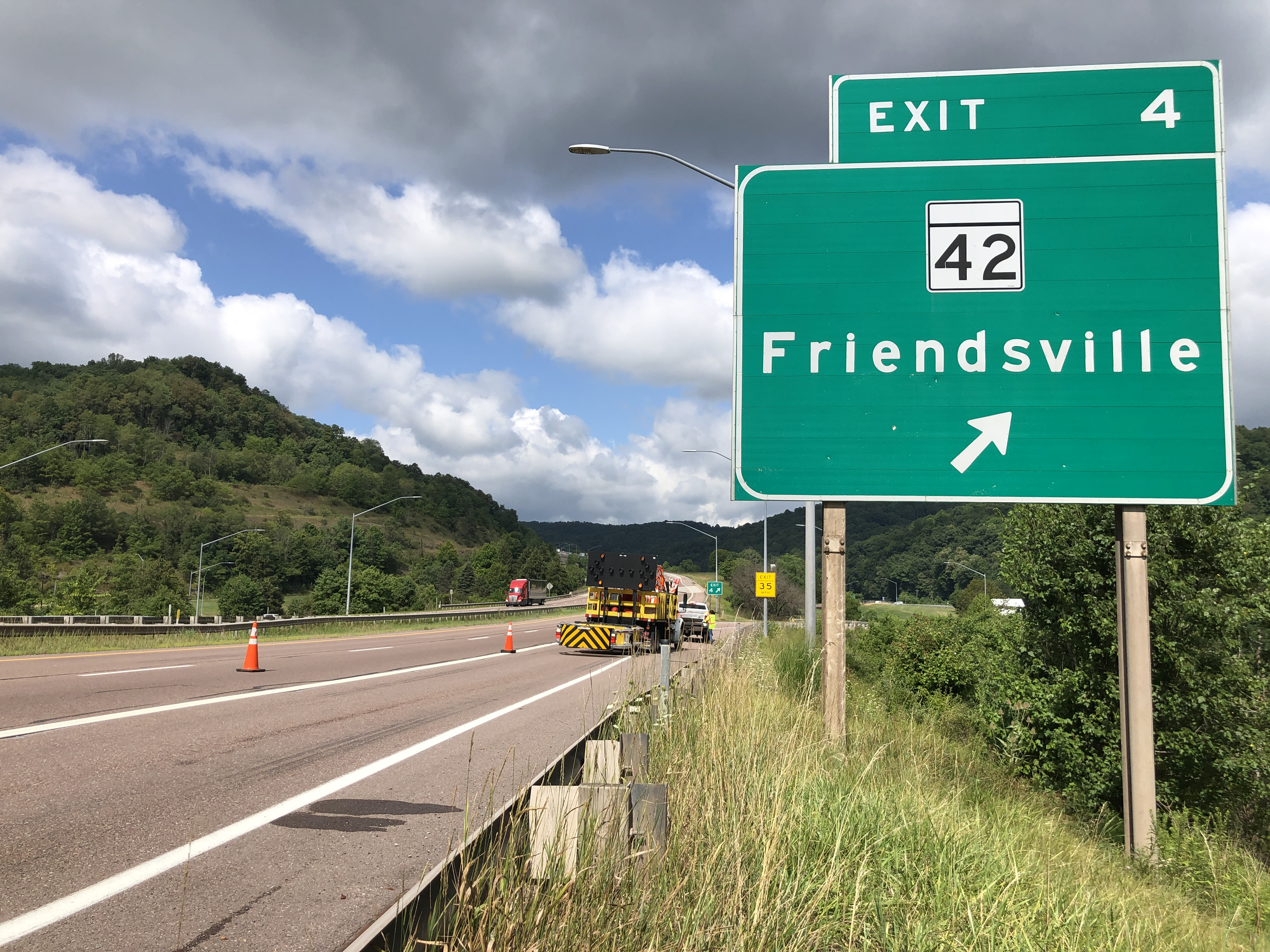
I-68 westbound at MD 42 in Friendsville

The primary mode of transportation to Friendsville is by road. Interstate 68 passes through the town, with access provided via an interchange at Maryland Route 42. Maryland Route 742 also serves Friendsville, following the old alignment of MD 42 through the center of town.

== Demographics ==
Historical population
Census	Pop.	Note	%±
1910	466		—
1920	408		−12.4%
1930	494		21.1%
1940	569		15.2%
1950	607		6.7%
1960	580		−4.4%
1970	566		−2.4%
1980	511		−9.7%
1990	577		12.9%
2000	539		−6.6%
2010	491		−8.9%
2020	438		−10.8%
U.S. Decennial Census

=== 2010 census ===
As of the census of 2010, there were 491 people, 219 households, and 128 families living in the town. The population density was 539.6 inhabitants per square mile (208.3/km^{2}). There were 272 housing units at an average density of 298.9 per square mile (115.4/km^{2}). The racial makeup of the town was 99.6% White, 0.2% Native American, and 0.2% Asian. Hispanic or Latino of any race were 0.6% of the population.

There were 219 households, of which 25.1% had children under the age of 18 living with them, 38.8% were married couples living together, 16.0% had a female householder with no husband present, 3.7% had a male householder with no wife present, and 41.6% were non-families. 34.7% of all households were made up of individuals, and 12.8% had someone living alone who was 65 years of age or older. The average household size was 2.24 and the average family size was 2.85.

The median age in the town was 44.6 years. 19.6% of residents were under the age of 18; 11.2% were between the ages of 18 and 24; 19.8% were from 25 to 44; 33% were from 45 to 64; and 16.5% were 65 years of age or older. The gender makeup of the town was 48.1% male and 51.9% female.

=== 2000 census ===
As of the census of 2000, there were 539 people, 232 households, and 134 families living in the town. The population density was 580.6 inhabitants per square mile (224.2/km^{2}). There were 266 housing units at an average density of 286.5 per square mile (110.6/km^{2}). The racial makeup of the town was 97.96% White, 0.56% African American, 0.74% Native American, 0.19% Asian, 0.19% Pacific Islander, 0.19% from other races, and 0.19% from two or more races. Hispanic or Latino of any race were 0.37% of the population.

There were 232 households, out of which 28.9% had children under the age of 18 living with them, 40.9% were married couples living together, 12.9% had a female householder with no husband present, and 42.2% were non-families. 39.2% of all households were made up of individuals, and 19.4% had someone living alone who was 65 years of age or older. The average household size was 2.32 and the average family size was 3.05.

In the town, the population was spread out, with 25.4% under the age of 18, 8.3% from 18 to 24, 27.1% from 25 to 44, 22.4% from 45 to 64, and 16.7% who were 65 years of age or older. The median age was 40 years. For every 100 females there were 97.4 males. For every 100 females age 18 and over, there were 94.2 males.

The median household income in the town was $24,286, and the median family income was $28,750. Males had a median income of $26,591 versus $15,000 for females. The per capita income for the town was $13,292. About 18.2% of families and 24.0% of the population were below the poverty line, including 29.9% of those under age 18 and 28.4% of those age 65 or over.
