= List of college athletic programs in Maryland =

This is a list of college athletic programs in the U.S. state of Maryland.

== NCAA ==
=== Division I ===
Full NCAA Division I member colleges in Maryland.
– FBS Football, – FCS Football, – Non-Football

Team	School	City	Conference	Sport sponsorship						
Team	School	City	Conference	Foot- ball	Basketball		Base- ball	Soft- ball	Soccer	
Team	School	City	Conference	Foot- ball	M	W	Base- ball	Soft- ball	M	W
Coppin State Eagles	Coppin State University	Baltimore	MEAC	No	Yes	Yes	Yes (Note: Coppin State and Maryland Eastern Shore's baseball teams compete as members of the Northeast Conference.)	Yes	No	No
Loyola Greyhounds	Loyola University Maryland	Baltimore	Patriot	No	Yes	Yes	No	No	Yes	Yes
Maryland Terrapins	University of Maryland, College Park	College Park	Big Ten	FBS	Yes	Yes	Yes	Yes	Yes	Yes
Maryland Eastern Shore Hawks	University of Maryland, Eastern Shore	Princess Anne	MEAC	No	Yes	Yes	Yes	Yes	No	No
Morgan State Bears and Lady Bears	Morgan State University	Baltimore	MEAC	FCS	Yes	Yes	No	Yes	No	No
Mount St. Mary's Mountaineers	Mount St. Mary's University	Emmitsburg	Metro	No	Yes	Yes	Yes	Yes	Yes	Yes
Navy Midshipmen	United States Naval Academy	Annapolis	Patriot	FBS (Note: Navy's football team competes in the American Athletic Conference.) (Note: Navy additionally fields a team in sprint football, a weight-restricted form of football not governed by the NCAA, as a member of the Collegiate Sprint Football League.)	Yes	Yes	Yes	No	Yes	Yes
Towson Tigers	Towson University	Towson	CAA	FCS (Note: Towson's football team competes in CAA Football, the technically separate football league operated by the all-sports CAA.)	Yes	Yes	Yes	Yes	No	Yes
UMBC Retrievers	University of Maryland, Baltimore County	Catonsville	America East	No	Yes	Yes	Yes	Yes	Yes	Yes

=== Division II ===
Full NCAA Division II member colleges in Maryland.

Team	School	City	Conference	Sport sponsorship						
Team	School	City	Conference	Foot- ball	Basketball		Base- ball	Soft- ball	Soccer	
Team	School	City	Conference	Foot- ball	M	W	Base- ball	Soft- ball	M	W
Bowie State Bulldogs	Bowie State University	Bowie	CIAA	Yes	Yes	Yes	No	Yes	No	No
Frostburg State Bobcats	Frostburg State University	Frostburg	Mountain East	Yes	Yes	Yes	Yes	Yes	Yes	Yes

=== Division III ===
Full NCAA Division III member colleges in Maryland.
– Football, – Non-Football

Team	School	City	Conference	Sport sponsorship										
Team	School	City	Conference	Foot- ball	Basketball		Base- ball	Soft- ball	Ice hockey		Soccer		Lacrosse	
Team	School	City	Conference	Foot- ball	M	W	Base- ball	Soft- ball	M	W	M	W	M	W
Goucher Gophers	Goucher College	Towson	Landmark	No	Yes	Yes	No	No	No	No	Yes	Yes	Yes	Yes
Hood Blazers	Hood College	Frederick	MAC (Commonwealth)	No	Yes	Yes	Yes	Yes	No	No	Yes	Yes	Yes	Yes
Johns Hopkins Blue Jays	Johns Hopkins University	Baltimore	Centennial	Yes	Yes	Yes	Yes	No	No	No	Yes	Yes	Yes	Yes
McDaniel Green Terror	McDaniel College	Westminster	Centennial	Yes	Yes	Yes	Yes	Yes	No	No	Yes	Yes	Yes	Yes
Notre Dame Gators	Notre Dame of Maryland University	Baltimore	United East	No	Yes	Yes	No	Yes	No	No	Yes	Yes	No	Yes
St. Mary's Seahawks	St. Mary's College of Maryland	St. Mary's City	United East	No	Yes	Yes	Yes	No	No	No	Yes	Yes	Yes	Yes
Salisbury Sea Gulls	Salisbury University	Salisbury	Coast to Coast	Yes (Note: Salisbury's football team competes in the New Jersey Athletic Conference.)	Yes	Yes	Yes	Yes	No	No	Yes	Yes	Yes	Yes
Stevenson Mustangs	Stevenson University	Stevenson	MAC (Commonwealth)	Yes	Yes	Yes	Yes	Yes	Yes (Note: Stevenson's ice hockey teams compete in the United Collegiate Hockey Conference.)	Yes	Yes	Yes	Yes	Yes
Washington College Shoremen and Shorewomen	Washington College	Chestertown	Centennial	No	Yes	Yes	Yes	Yes	No	No	Yes	Yes	Yes	Yes

== NAIA ==
Full NAIA member colleges in Maryland.
– Non-Football

Team	School	City	Conference	Sport sponsorship					
Team	School	City	Conference	Basketball		Base- ball	Soft- ball	Soccer	
Team	School	City	Conference	M	W	Base- ball	Soft- ball	M	W
Washington Adventist Shock	Washington Adventist University	Takoma Park	Independent	Yes	Yes	No	Yes	Yes	Yes

== NJCAA ==
Team	School	City	Conference
Allegany Trojans	Allegany College of Maryland	Cumberland	Maryland JC
Anne Arundel Riverhawks	Anne Arundel Community College	Arnold	Maryland JC
Baltimore City Panthers	Baltimore City Community College	Baltimore	Maryland JC
CCBC-Catonsville Cardinals	CCBC-Catonsville	Catonsville	Maryland JC
CCBC-Dundalk Lions	CCBC-Dundalk	Baltimore	Maryland JC
CCBC-Essex Knights	CCBC-Essex	Baltimore	Maryland JC
Cecil Seahawks	Cecil College	North East	Maryland JC
Chesapeake Skipjacks	Chesapeake College	Wye Mills	Maryland JC
Frederick Cougars	Frederick Community College	Frederick	Maryland JC
Garrett Lakers	Garrett College	McHenry	Maryland JC
Hagerstown Hawks	Hagerstown Community College	Hagerstown	Maryland JC
Harford Fighting Owls	Harford Community College	Bel Air	Maryland JC
Howard Dragons	Howard Community College	Columbia	Maryland JC
Montgomery Raptors	Montgomery College	Takoma Park	Maryland JC
Prince George's Owls	Prince George's Community College	Largo	Maryland JC
Southern Maryland Hawks	College of Southern Maryland	La Plata	Maryland JC

== Defunct ==
Team	School	Division	Defunct
UBalt Bees	University of Baltimore		1983

== See also ==
- List of NCAA Division I institutions
- List of NCAA Division II institutions
- List of NCAA Division III institutions
- List of NAIA institutions
- List of USCAA institutions
- List of NCCAA institutions
- List of NJCAA Division I institutions
- List of NJCAA Division II institutions
- List of NJCAA Division III institutions
