= Adventure Sports Center International =

White water rafting and canoe/kayak slalom center at Deep Creek Lake, McHenry, Maryland

Coordinates: 39.546°N 79.372°W

About
- Locale: McHenry, Maryland United States
- Managing agent: Adventure Sports Center, Inc.
- Main shape: Loop
- Water source: Deep Creek Lake
- Pumped: 3 pumps (plus one in reserve)
- Practice pool: Yes
- Construction: 2003-2007, 2013
- Opening date: May 2007

Stats
- Length: 579 metres (1,900 ft)
- Slope: 1.7% (300 m Slalom Course)
- Flowrate: 12.7 m^{3}/s (450 cu ft/s)

Adventure Sports Center International is an Olympic standard white water rafting and canoe/kayak slalom center located on the mountaintop above the Wisp Ski Resort at Deep Creek Lake, McHenry, Maryland, United States. In addition to serving as a venue for slalom races and training, the center offers a range of services to the general public, including guided raft trips, inflatable kayak rentals, and riverboard rentals.

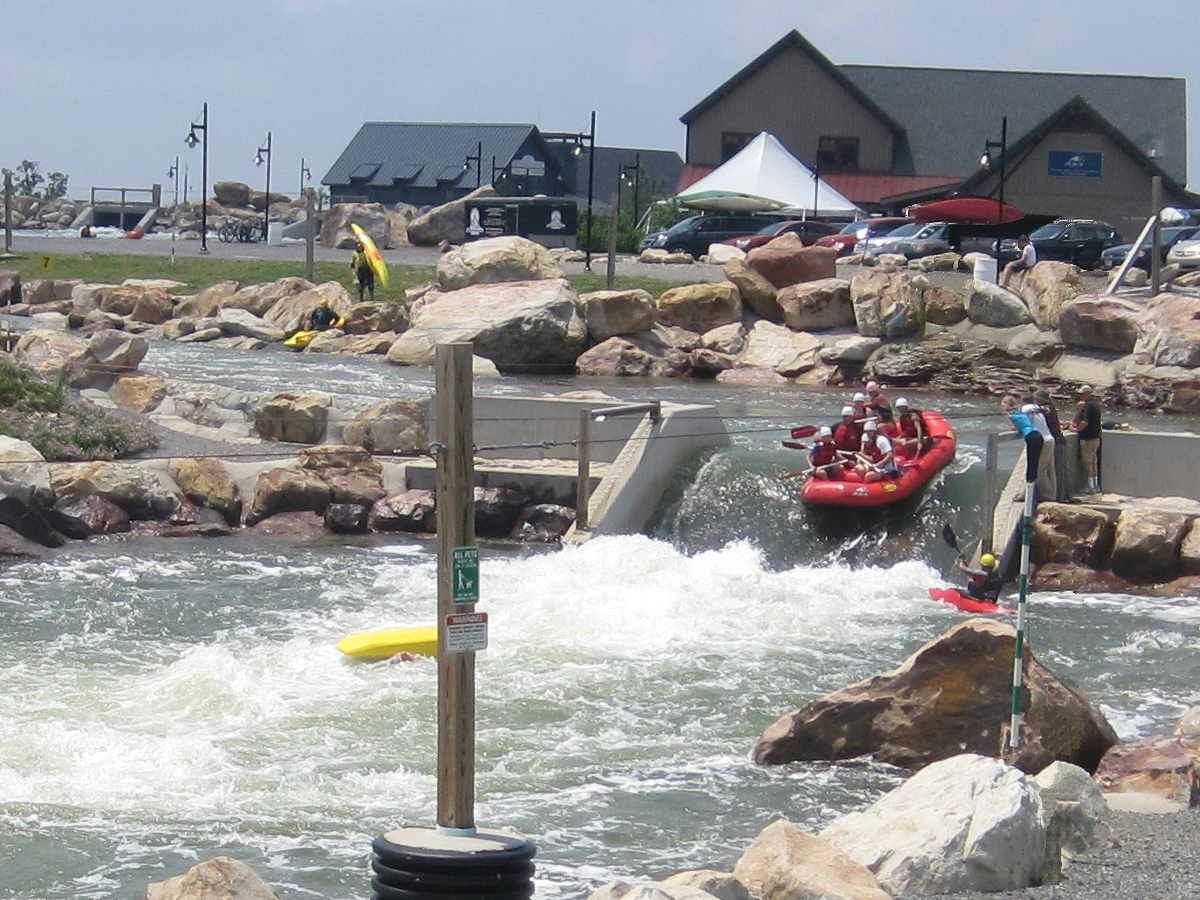

The center opened in May 2007, constructed for $24 million, and is the third pump-powered artificial whitewater facility built in North America. Its educational partner in water sports instruction is the Adventuresports Institute of nearby Garrett College, which offers degrees in outdoor adventure sports.

== History ==
The concept of Adventure Sports Center International (ASCI) originated after the 1989 Whitewater Slalom World Championships on the remote Savage River in Western Maryland. Sergi Orsi, then president of the International Canoe Federation, encouraged the organizers of the 1989 Savage River event to build a pump-powered artificial whitewater course in a more accessible location nearby. The Maryland state government supported the project to promote summer tourism in the region.

Since the Wisp Ski Resort already had a pump-filled mountaintop reservoir to supply its snowmaking machines with water in the winter, the artificial whitewater course was sited next to this reservoir to make use of its water in the summer. The roads, motels, and restaurants that served the ski area in the winter made the location accessible to summer visitors.

In April 2011, ASCI was chosen as the site for the 2014 World Championship slalom competition. The races were held on September 16–21. Several modifications were made for the 2014 competition, including two boulder removals and several streambed changes.

== Course Design ==

The course plans were drawn by the McLaughlin Whitewater Design Group, architects of the Ocoee Whitewater Center, which served as the canoe slalom venue for the 1996 Summer Olympics in Atlanta. The Ocoee facility is the only Olympic whitewater venue built in a riverbed, using natural boulders to direct the water flow, and McLaughlin used a similar design here—with a channel shaped like a natural streambed and lined with natural boulders blasted from the mountaintop. The purpose was both aesthetic and practical. Irregular surfaces dampen the water surges that can occur in geometrically regular artificial channels.

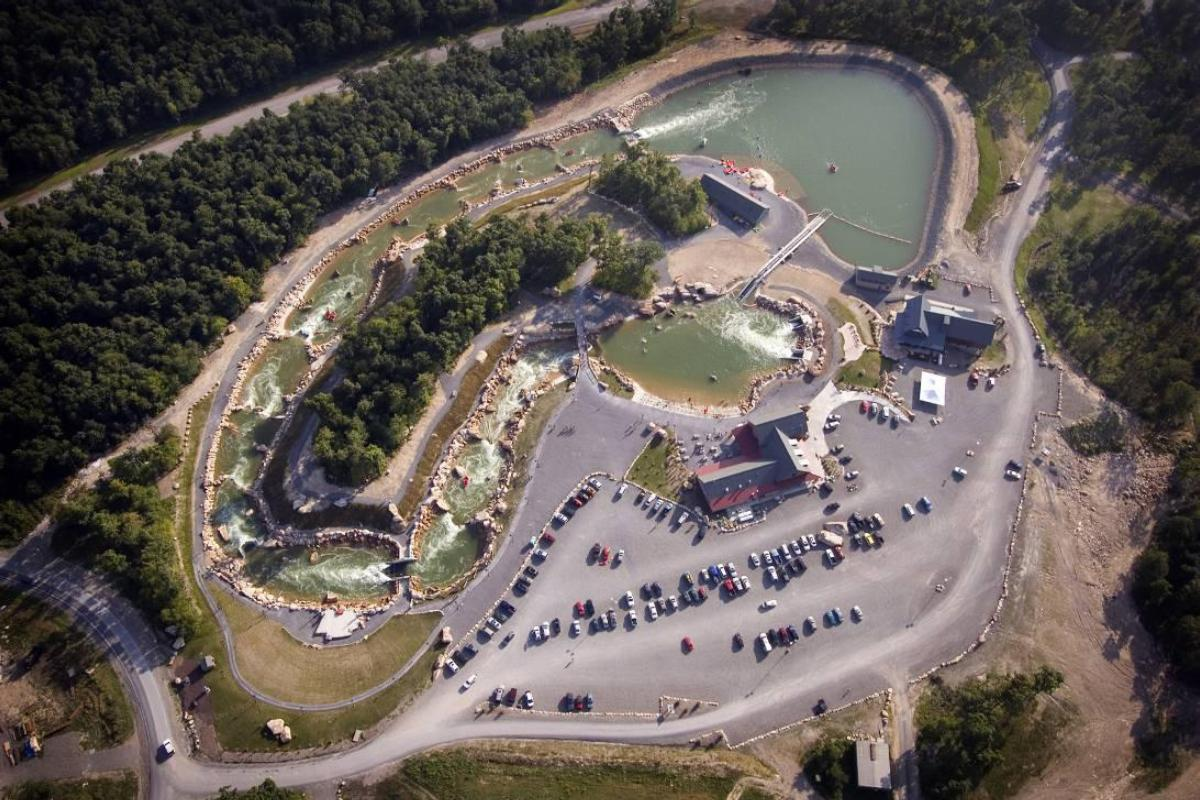

The first 100 meters of the course originally began with a stream-wide drop from the start pool and a split around a "Dark Destroyer" boulder in the middle of the stream. However, in the winter of 2013, the top drop was narrowed and moved back into the start pool, reducing the slope, and the mid-stream boulder was removed. The next three drops were modified with underwater speed bumps to slow down the water and reduce surges. The first 100 meters remains the steepest and narrowest part of the course, but it is now more of a pool-drop stream than a continuous rapid. At any point, swimmers can escape the current and swim ashore.

The last 280 meters of the course, starting at the lower bridge beyond the 300-meter competition section, is a practice area with easy put-in and take-out on either shore. The last feature is a 10-foot (3.0 m) spillway drop into the lower pool. A conveyor belt carries boats and paddlers back to the start pool.

To create standing waves for freestyle (rodeo) competition, hydraulically adjustable wave shaping plates were placed under the water in six locations: two where pump-driven water enters the start pool, and one at the bottom of each of the four concrete-walled spillway drops. Jimmy Blakeney, 2003 U.S. National Freestyle Kayak Champion, assisted in the final design of the wave shapers.

== ICF Canoe Slalom World Championships ==
On December 11, 2012, Adventure Sports Center International's bid was selected in Paris, France, and they became the official site for the ICF World Championships. In 2014, ASCI served as the official venue for the 2014 ICF Canoe Slalom World Championships. The event was held from September 17 to 21, 2014. Events included were the men's and women's C1, the men's and women's C2, and the men's and women's K1.

== Gallery - Slalom gates and 2013 modifications ==
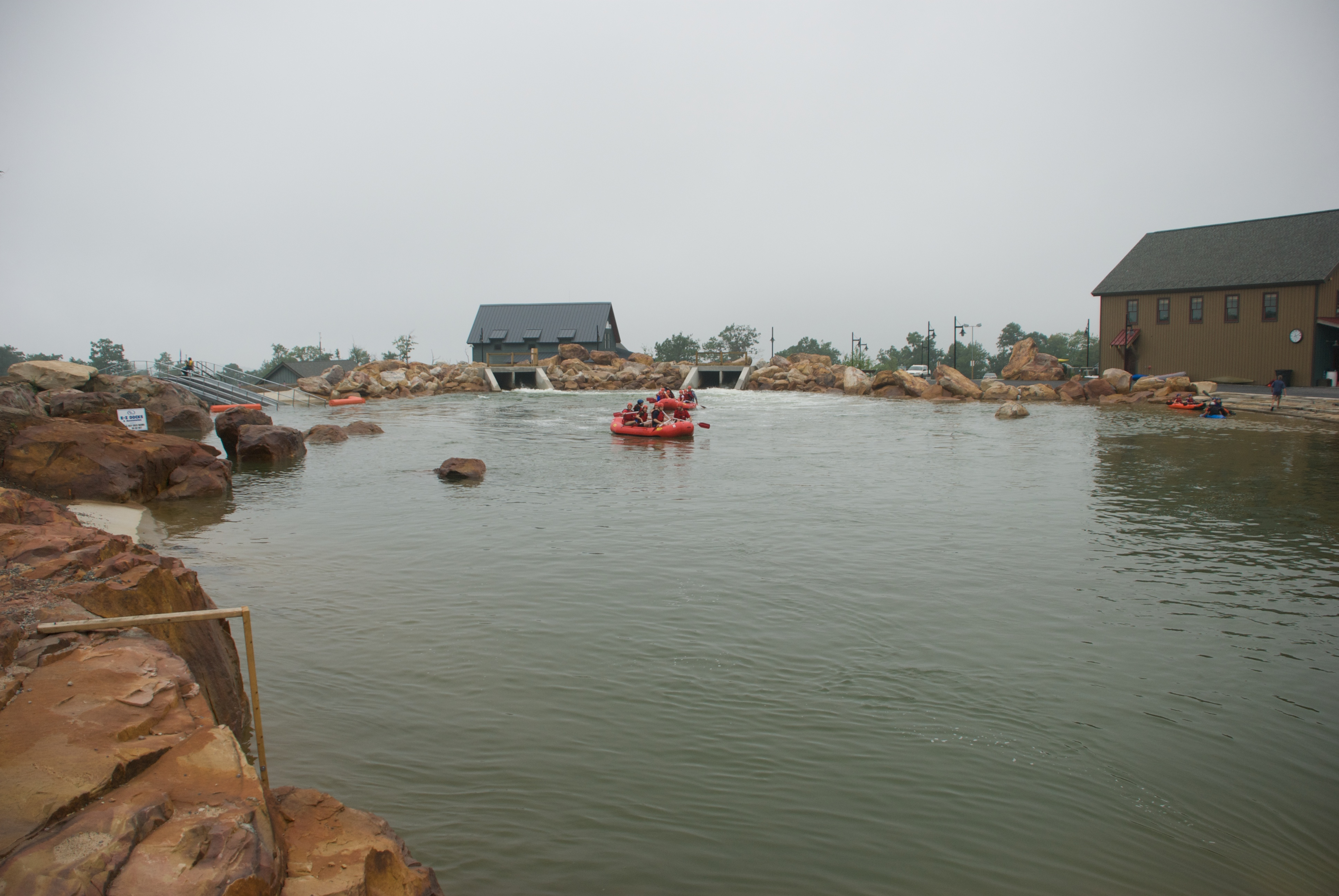
The upper pond

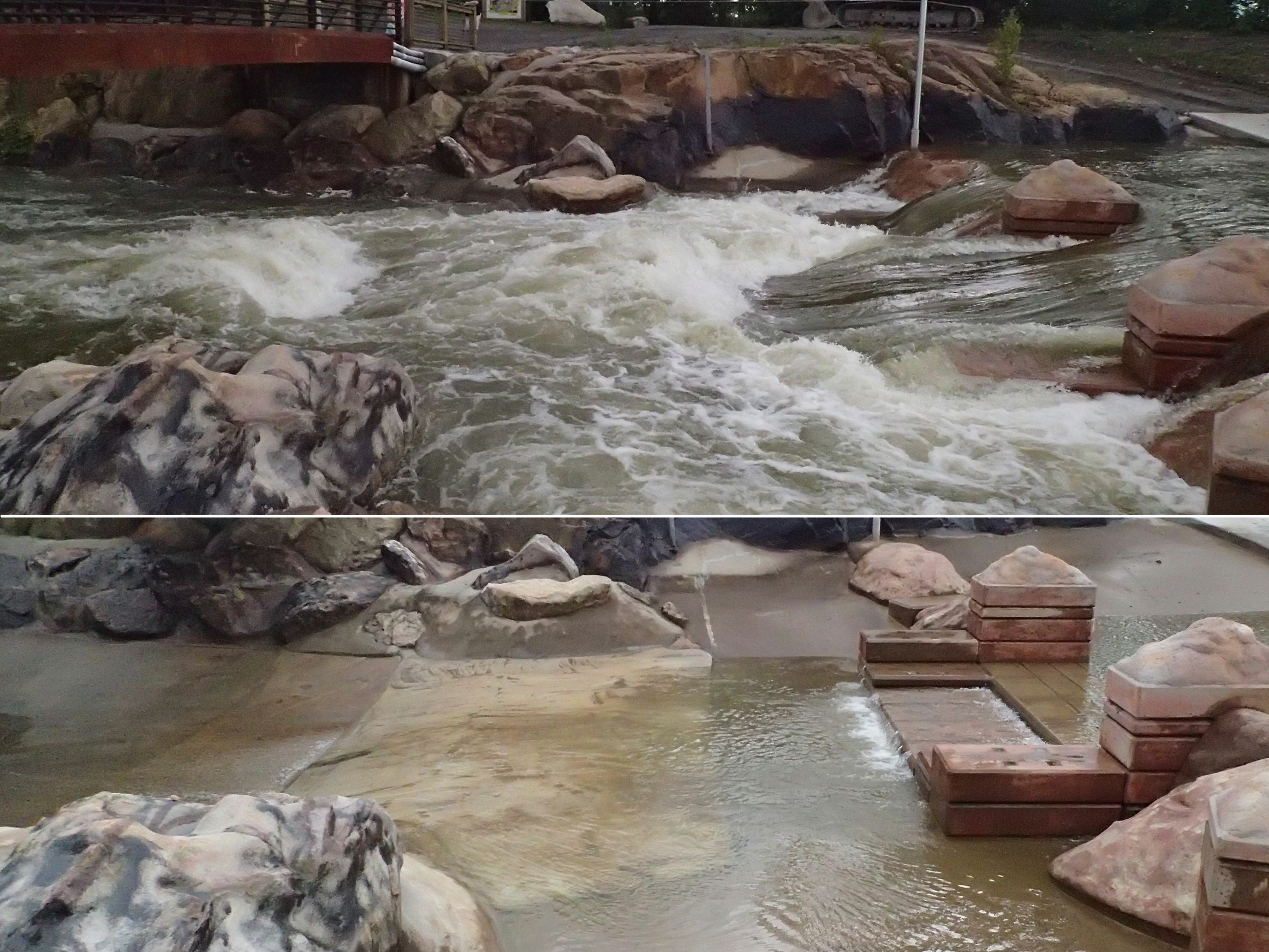
Top drop with and without water, 2013 modification.

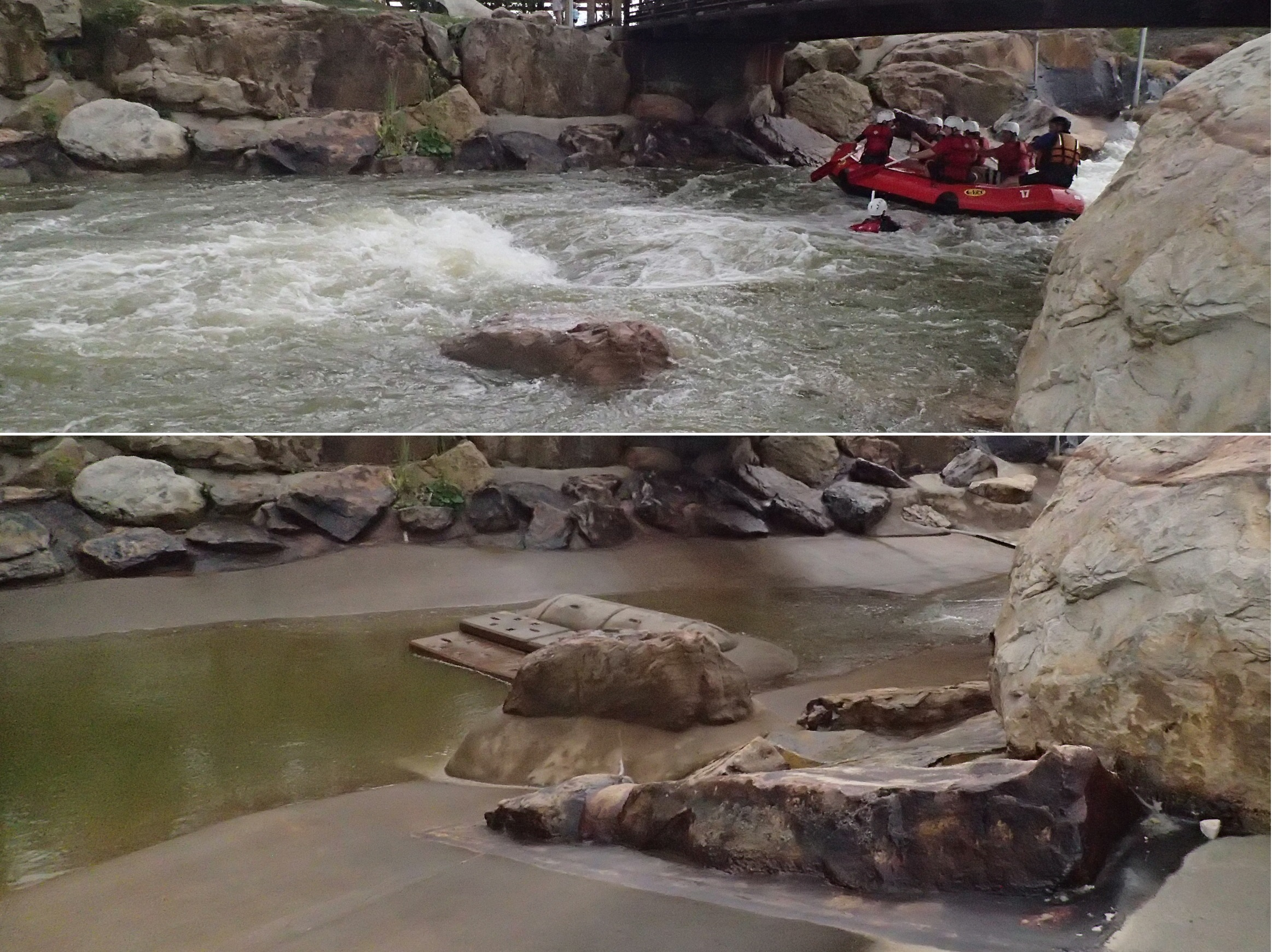
Standing waves under bridge with and without water, 2013 modification.

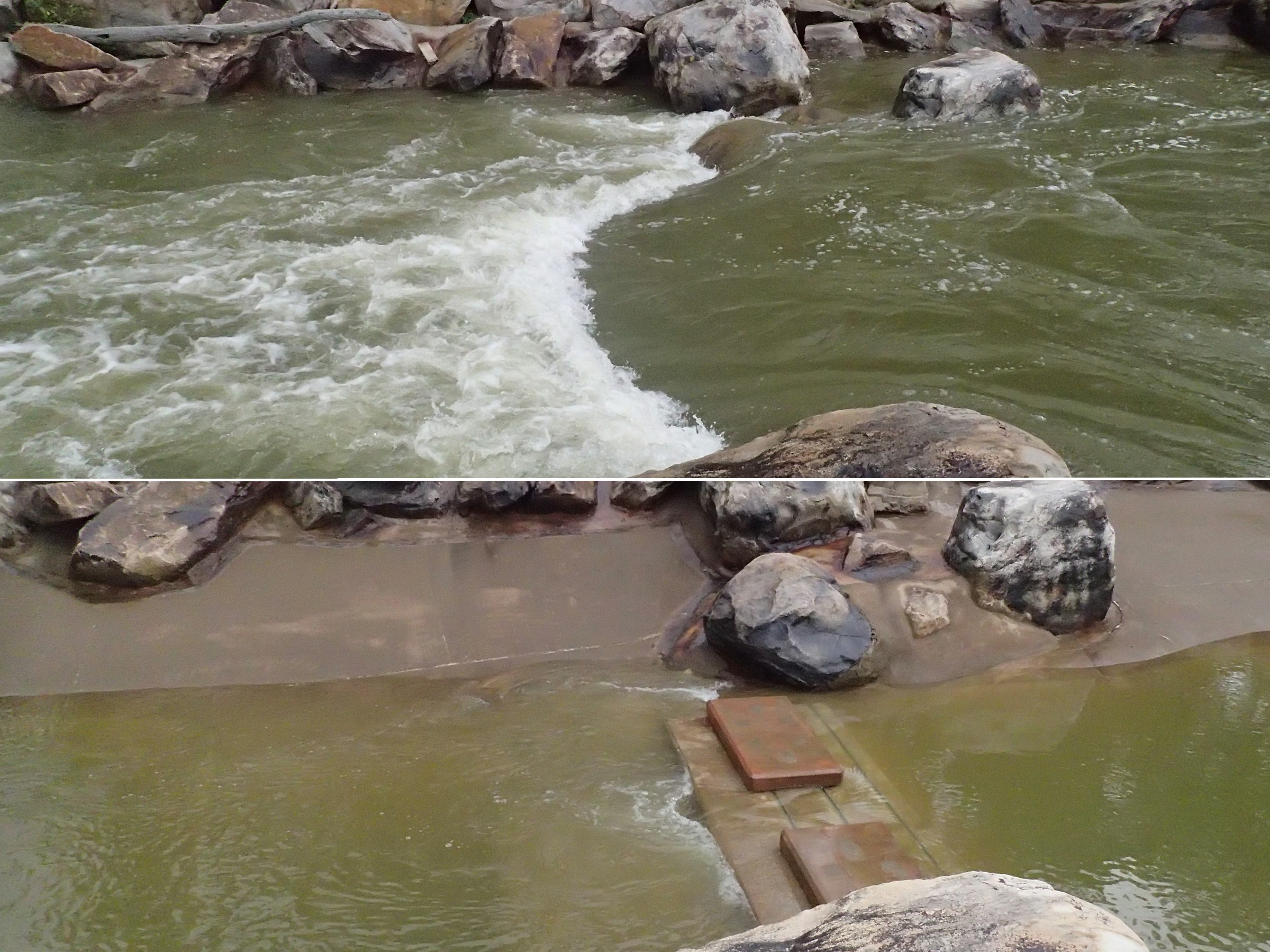
Second drop with and without water, 2013 modification.

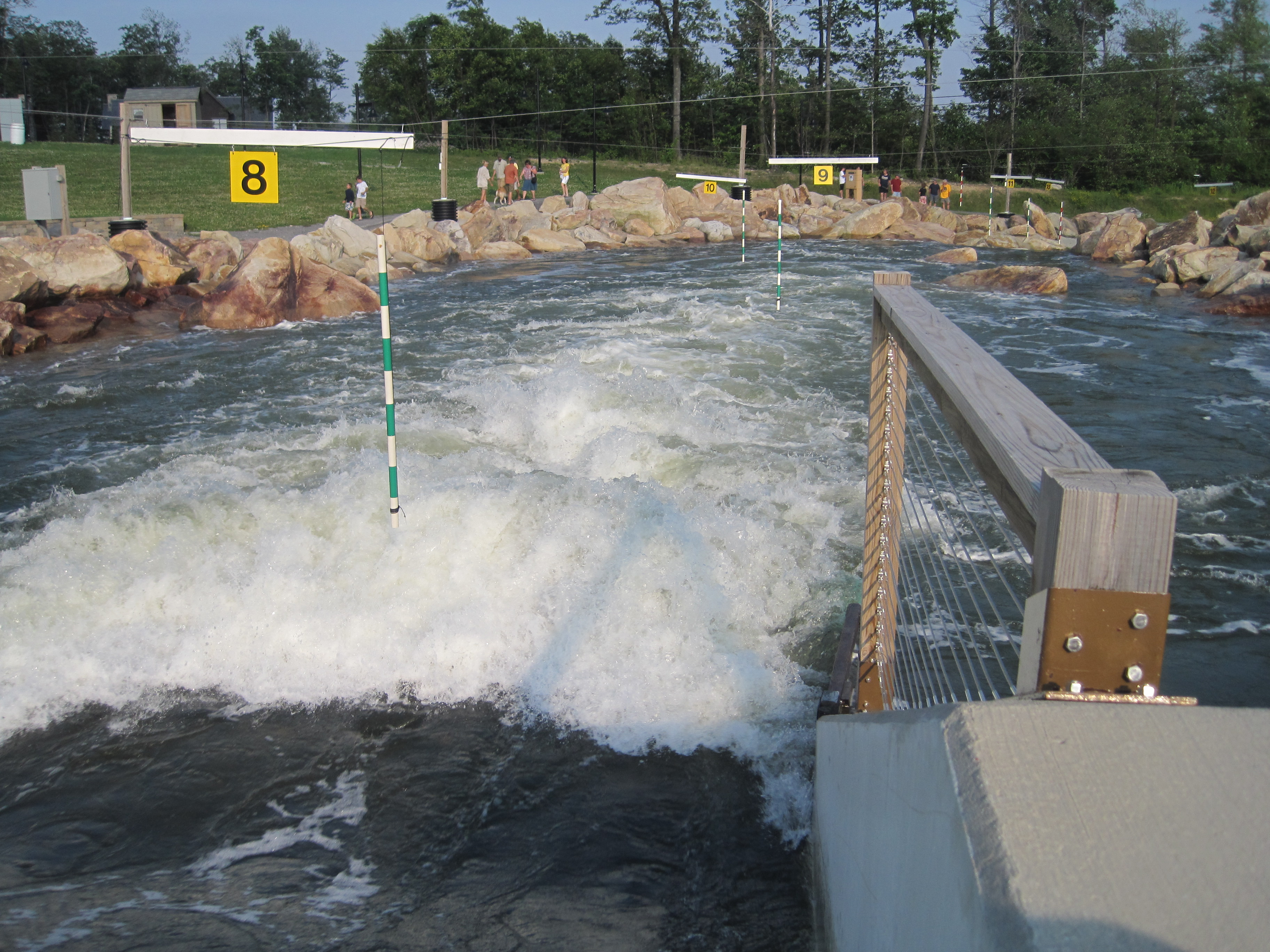
First Spillway drop.

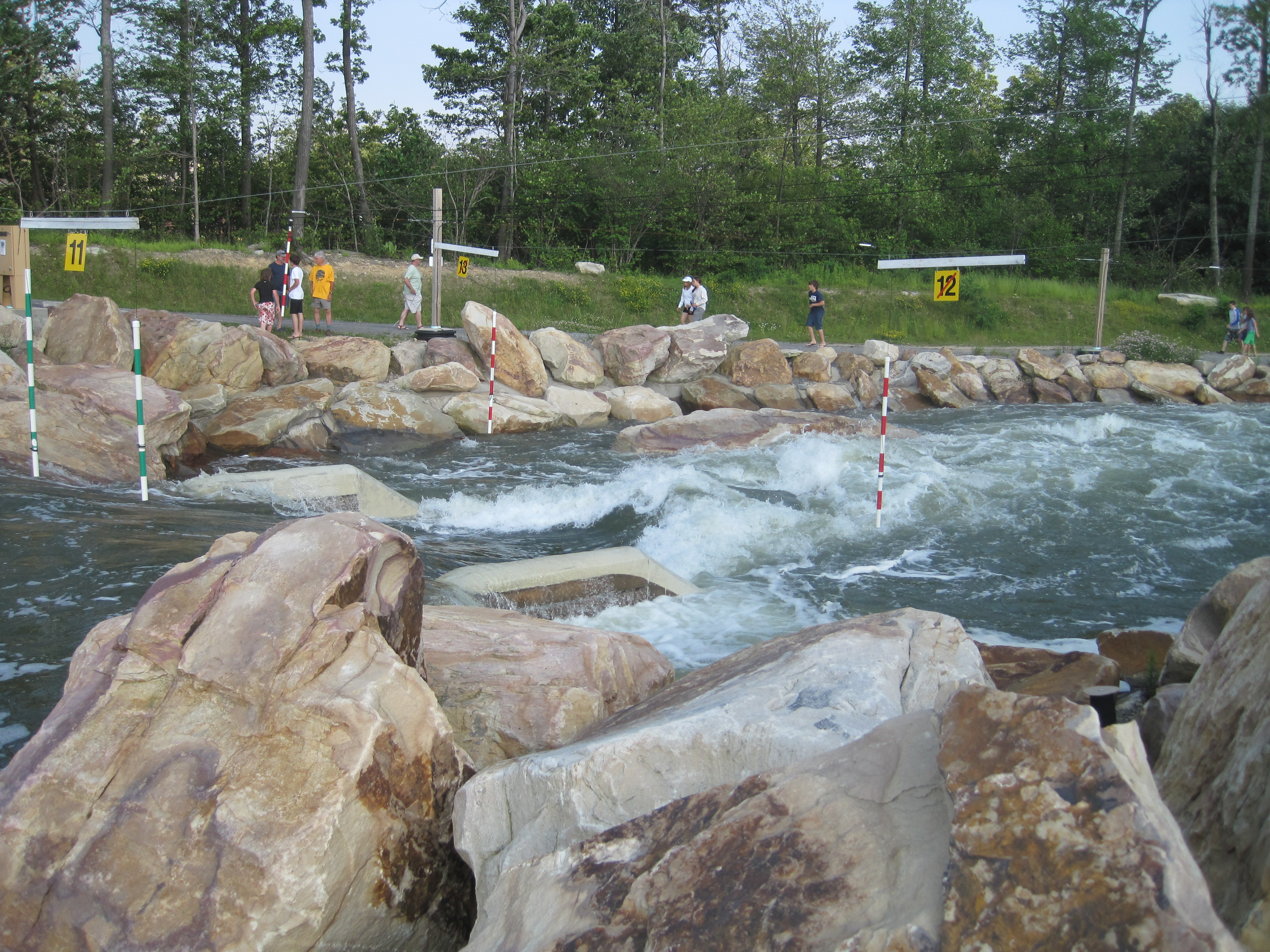
Second Spillway drop.

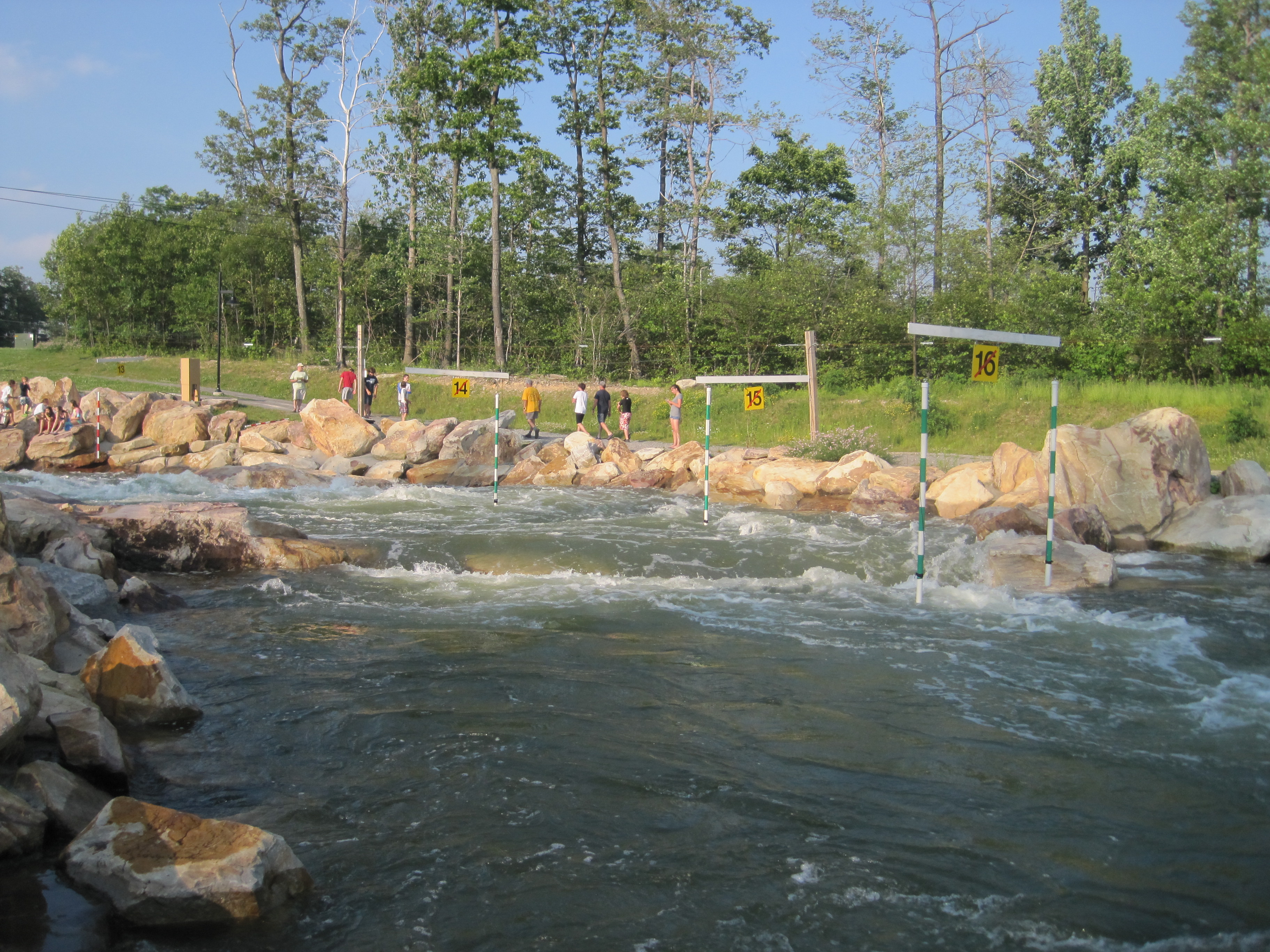
2010 Gates #14 through #16.

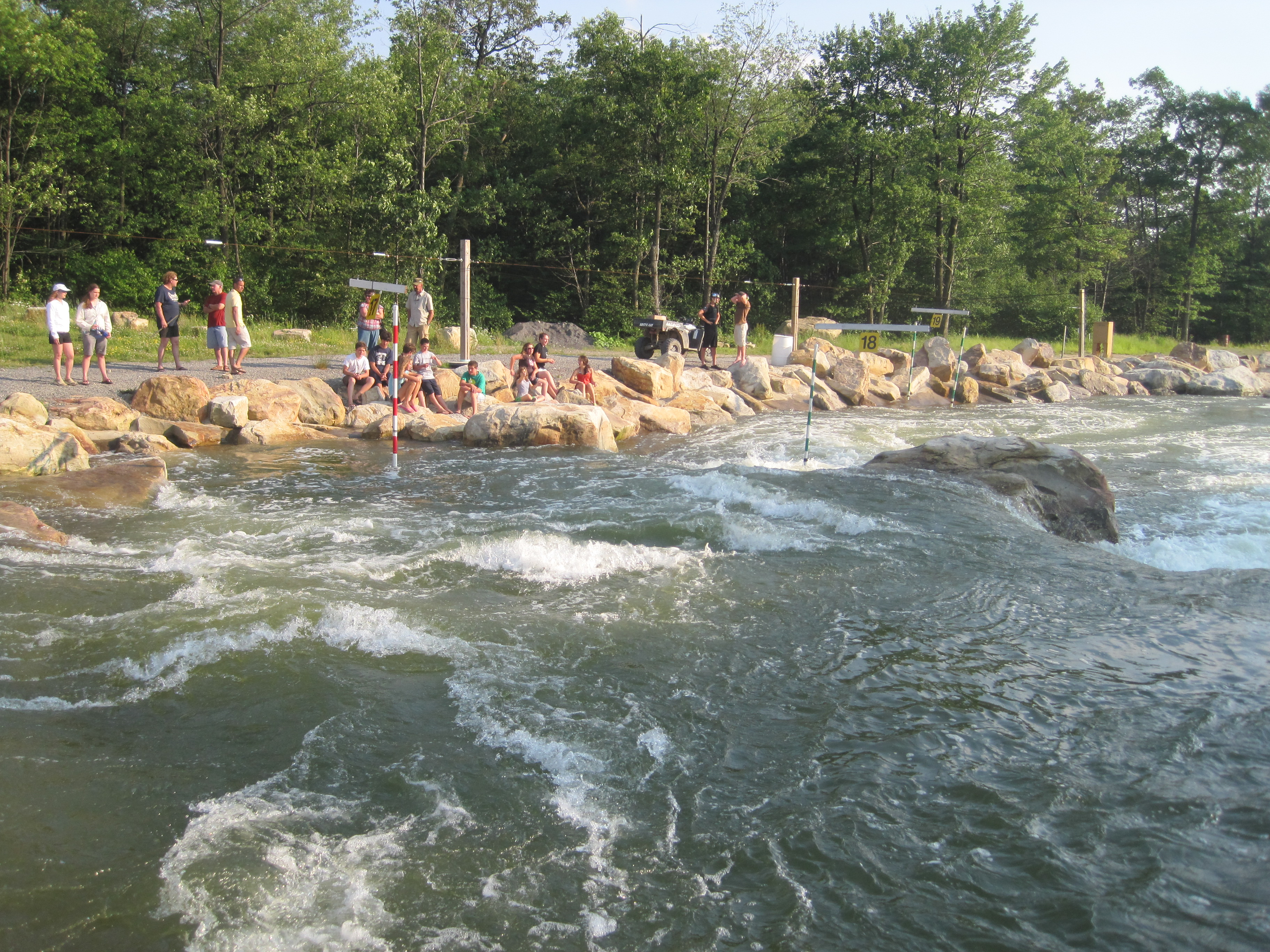
2010 Gates #17 through #19 (last gate).

Gates for Age-Group Nationals, June 27, 2010

Gates for U.S. Nationals, 9 September 2012

Gates for the Heats of the World Championships, 2014 Sep 17-18

Gates for the Finals of the World Championships, 2014 Sep 18-20

== SuperShafty Fall Crawl - National Radio Control Truck Competition ==
On the weekend of October 19–21, 2018, Adventure Sports Center International became the official site for the first SuperShafty Fall Crawl National-level Radio Control Truck Competition.

The pumps were turned off, and the water was drained for this event. 117 RC trucks were in attendance for 2018.

In 2019, the event took place from September 27 to 29. Events included for 2018 and 2019 were: SORRCA Class 1, Class 2, Class 3, and an Ultra4-style foot race. 191 RC trucks were in attendance.

The 2020 event took place from October 1 to 4 and included WRCCA and SORRCA-style events, as well as the Ultra4 and Spotter Challenge. 320 RC trucks were in attendance.

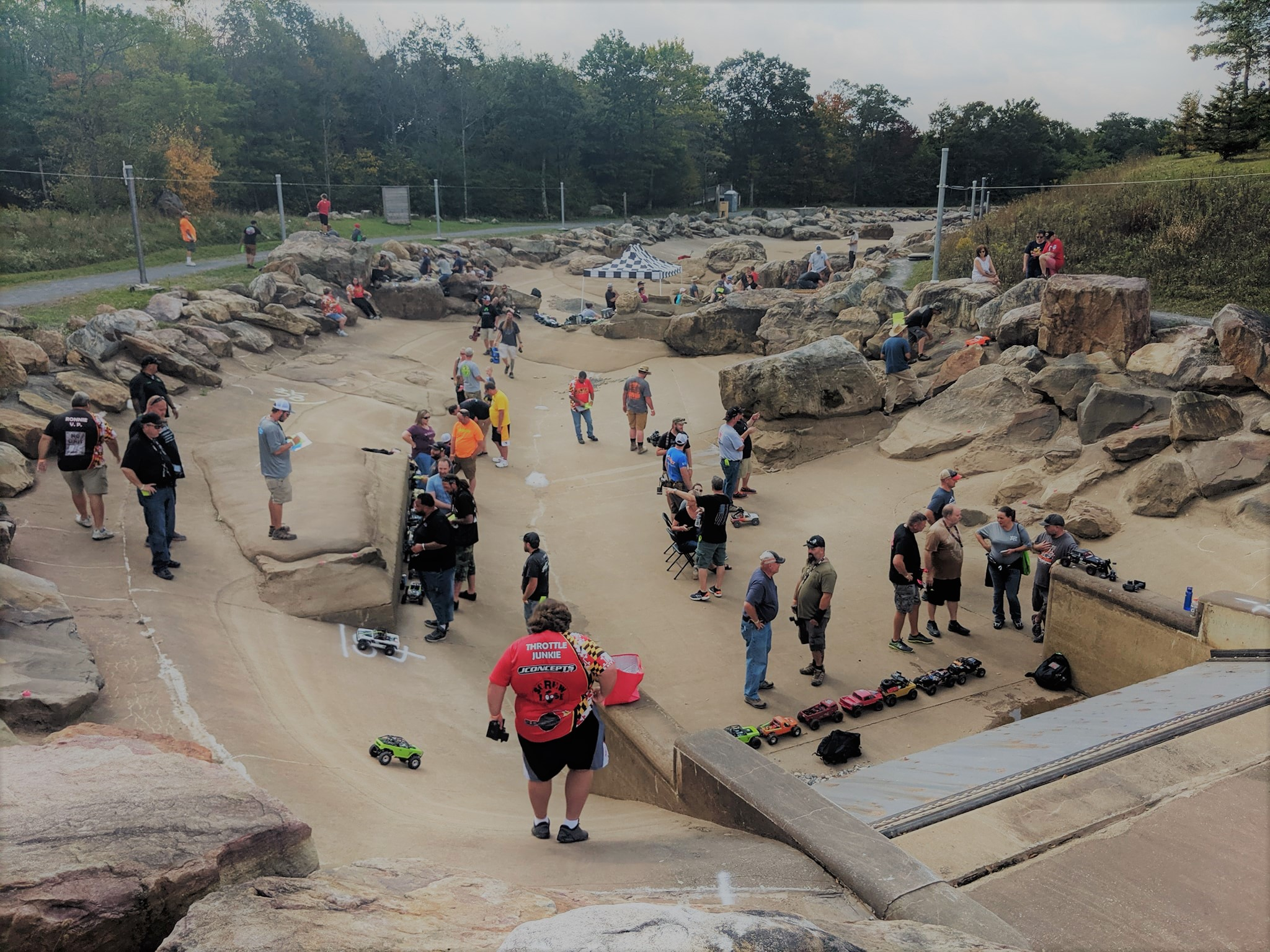
2019 SSFC Event Photo

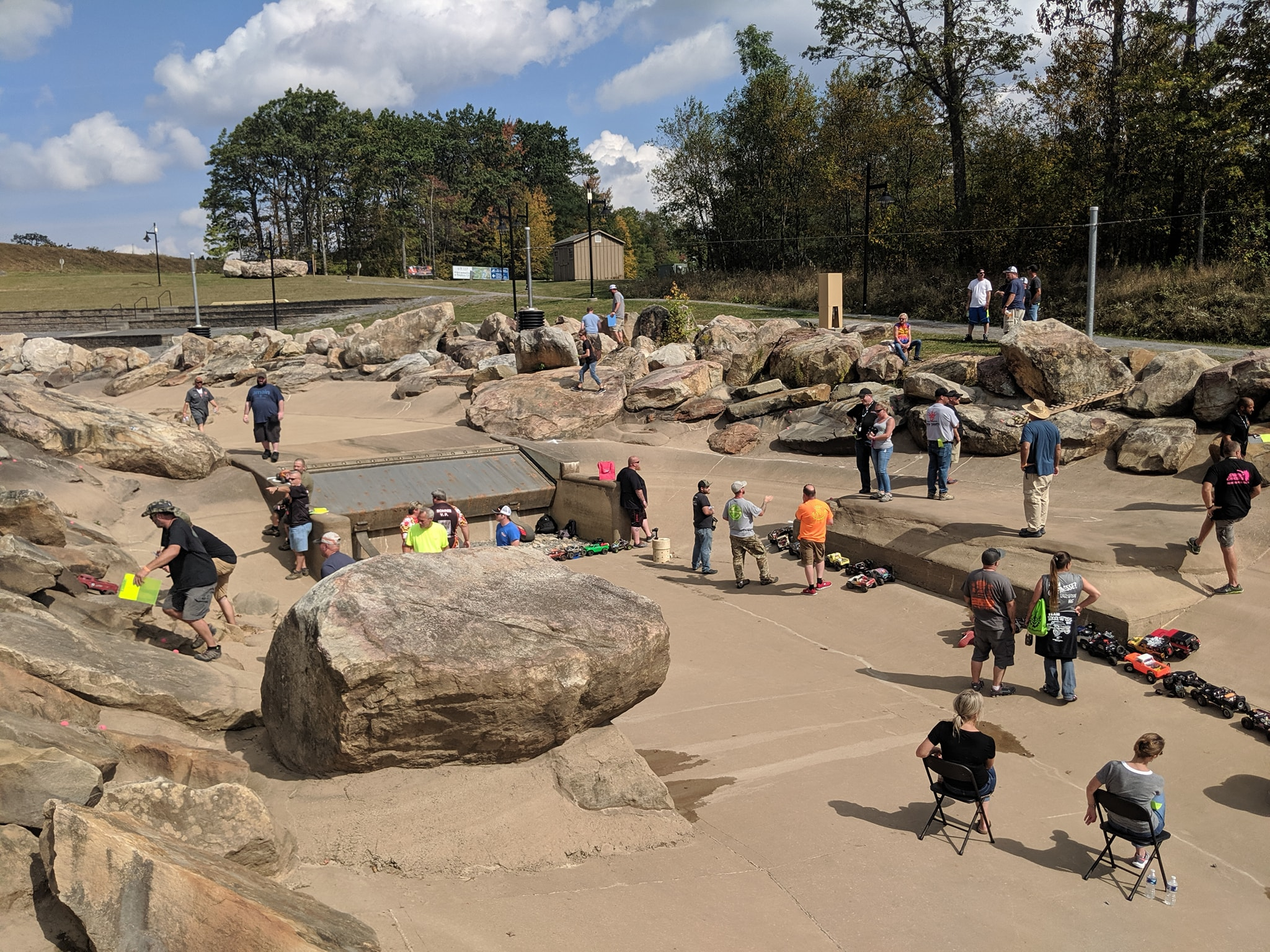
2019 SSFC Event Photo
