= Daria Willis =

American academic administrator and historian

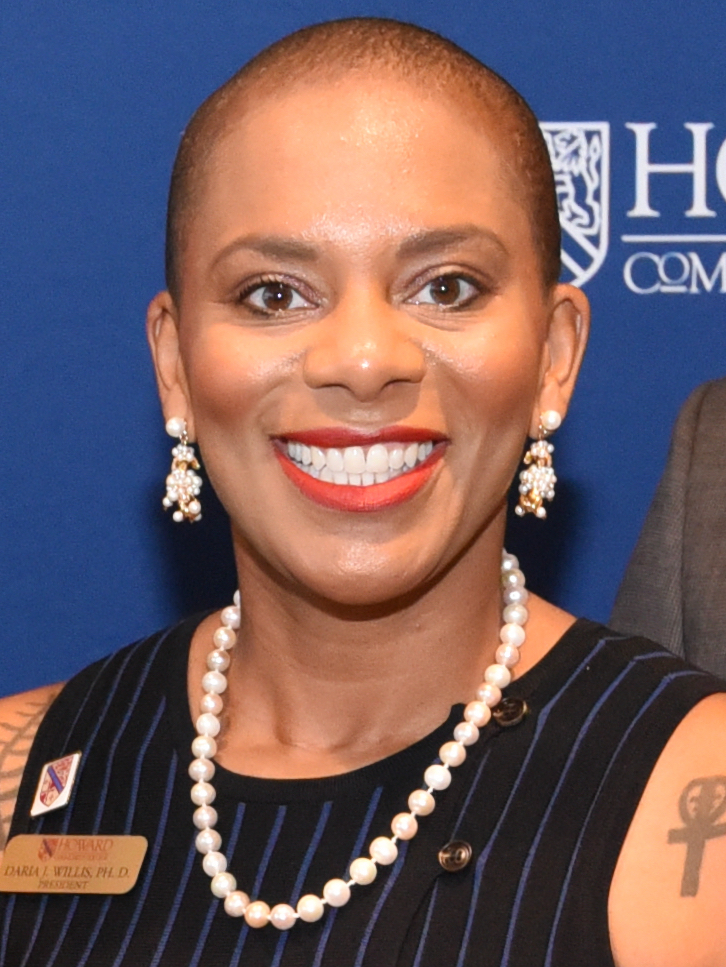

President of Howard Community College
- Incumbent
- Assumed office January 10, 2022
- Preceded by: Kathleen Hetherington

President of Everett Community College
- In office July 1, 2019 – January 2022

Personal details
- Children: 3
- Education: Florida A&M University; Florida State University

Daria J. Willis is an American academic administrator and historian. She is the president of Howard Community College. Willis was president of Everett Community College from 2019 to 2021. She is the first African American president at both institutions. Willis was an assistant professor in history in the Lone Star College System.

== Education ==
Willis is from Atlanta. When she was six, her father died from AIDS. She completed high school in three years. Willis completed a bachelor's in African American studies and a master's degree in applied social science at Florida A&M University. She earned a Ph.D. in history from Florida State University. Her 2012 dissertation about Adella Hunt was titled The life and times of Adella Hunt Logan: Educator, mother, wife, and suffragist, 1863–1915. Maxine D. Jones was Willis' doctoral advisor.

== Career ==
Willis was an adjunct professor of history at Tallahassee Community College. With the Lone Star College System, she was an assistant professor of history, faculty senate president, department chairwoman, and executive dean of centers. Willis was dean of academic studies at Lee College.

Willis joined the faculty at Onondaga Community College in July 2016. At Onondaga, she was provost and senior vice president for academic affairs. In 2018, Willis received a 40 under 40 award from the American Association for Women in Community Colleges. She chaired the NAACP education committee. On July 1, 2019, Willis became president of Everett Community College, succeeding Dave Beyer. She was the institution's first African American president.

On November 5, 2021, Willis was announced as the incoming president of Howard Community College (HCC). She succeeded Kathleen Hetherington and interim president Lynn Coleman on January 10, 2022. Willis is the first African American to hold this position.

On November 7, 2025 the Howard Community College Faculty Forum Constituency Committee representing all faculty on campus sent a letter to the Board of Trustees expressing a vote of no confidence in Willis' leadership as President of Howard Community College. The committee cited the instability of her leadership, a hostile work environment, disrespect towards faculty, mismanagement and financial misconduct.

== Personal life ==
Willis had a daughter when she was 19. At the age of 21, she divorced her first husband. Willis is married to Isiah David Brown. They met in Tallahassee, FL. Willis has two daughters and a son.
