= Garrett College =

Community college in McHenry, Maryland, U.S.

- Former name: Garrett Community College
- Motto: Experience. Explore. Excel.
- Type: Public community college
- Established: 1966
- President: Richard Midcap
- Undergraduates: 900
- Other students: 4,000
- Location: McHenry, Maryland, U.S. 39°33′40″N 79°20′32″W
- Nickname: Lakers
- Sporting affiliations: NJCAA Region XX
- Website: garrettcollege.edu
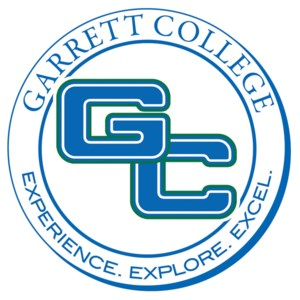

Garrett College is a public community college in McHenry, Maryland. The college has three outreach centers: Accident, Grantsville, and Oakland.

== History ==
Garrett College was established in 1966 as Garrett Community College, and took its present name in 2002. In 1968, the Garrett Community College Board of Trustees acquired a site in McHenry, Maryland and construction of the campus began shortly thereafter. It officially opened its doors to students in 1971.

In 2012, construction of the Garrett College Community Aquatic and Recreation Complex (CARC) was completed. The CARC is a 42,500-square-foot facility that houses a gymnasium, a six-lane competition swimming pool, a fully equipped fitness facility, locker and shower rooms, a wet classroom for instruction, multi-use classroom space, and a physical and occupational therapy facility. In 2018, Garrett College opened a state-of-the-art STEM building. In 2018, Garrett College announced that it would be moving forward with a new performing arts center. Architecture and engineering work began on July 1, 2018, and construction began the following year. The PAC opened in the summer of 2022.

== Academics ==
Garrett College offers four different associate degrees: Associate in Arts (AA), Associate in Arts in Teaching (AAT), Associate of Science (AS), and Associate in Applied Science (AAS). Within these degree options, the college offers 16 programs of study and 12 different concentrations. The college also offers eight non-degree transfer options, three certificate programs, and numerous continuing education programs. Taking advantage of its scenic surroundings and nearby Deep Creek Lake, Wisp Ski Resort and the Adventure Sports Center International, Garrett College offers an unusual associate degree in Adventure Sports.

=== Accreditation ===
Garrett College is a member of the Maryland Association of Community Colleges and is one of 16 junior colleges in the state. Garrett College is accredited by the Middle States Commission on Higher Education. The Maryland Higher Education Commission (MHEC) oversees and coordinates higher education in the State of Maryland, including academic and financial policies at the college. The college is also accredited and approved for operation by the Maryland Higher Education Commission (MHEC).

== Athletics ==
Garrett College is a member of the National Junior College Athletic Association (NJCAA) and the Maryland Junior College Athletic Conference (MD JUCO). Garrett College added wrestling in 2017, becoming the first Maryland junior college to offer a wrestling program. The college competes in:

- Baseball
- Basketball (men's and women's)
- Softball
- Volleyball
- Wrestling
- Women's Soccer
