= Mary Ellen Duncan =

American academic administrator and teacher (1941–2022)

President of Howard Community College
- In office 1998 – June 2008
- Preceded by: Dwight A. Burrill
- Succeeded by: Kathleen Hetherington

President of the State University of New York at Delhi
- In office September 1, 1991 – July 1, 1998
- Preceded by: Seldon M. Kruger
- Succeeded by: Mary E. Rittling (interim)

Interim president of Catonsville Community College
- In office 1990–1991

Personal details
- Born: August 29, 1941
- Died: February 10, 2022 (aged 80)
- Education: St. John's University; University of Connecticut
- Occupation: Academic administrator, teacher

Mary Ellen Duncan (August 29, 1941 – February 10, 2022) was an American academic administrator and teacher. She was a high school English and Latin teacher for nine years before becoming an academic administrator. Duncan served as interim president of Catonsville Community College from 1990 to 1991. She was president of State University of New York at Delhi before working as president of Howard Community College from 1998 to 2008.

== Early life and education ==
Duncan born on August 29, 1941 and raised on Long Island, New York. By third grade, Duncan knew she wanted to be a teacher. She graduated from West Islip High School in 1959. Duncan completed a B.S. at St. John's University in 1963. She was an English and Latin high school teacher for nine years.

== Career ==
In 1975, Duncan taught at Tri-County Technical College. The next year, she worked for a community college consortium. Duncan earned a M.A. (1973) and Ph.D. (1982) in curriculum administration at the University of Connecticut. Her 1982 dissertation was titled Educational commitments and attitudes of part-time and full-time instructors in the two-year technical colleges in South Carolina. Her doctoral advisor was Arthur D. Roberts.

At Catonsville Community College, Duncan was dean of planning and development for three years and interim president from 1990 to 1991.

On September 1, 1991, Duncan succeeded Seldon M. Kruger as president of the State University of New York at Delhi. During her tenure, she was head of the University Colleges of Technology, a collection of two-year technical colleges. Duncan established a bachelor's degree program in business administration in hospital management. She also increased Delhi's distance learning capabilities. Duncan established the office for business and industry relations. She worked with New York state senator Charles D. Cook to implement a gifted and talented program offering college-level courses to high school students. She served in this role until July 1, 1998. Duncan was succeeded by interim president Mary E. Rittling.

In 1998, Duncan succeeded Dwight A. Burrill as the third president of Howard Community College. During her first 4.5 years, the college built a children's learning center for students with children, established the Silas Craft Collegians financial and social support program, renovated athletics facilities, and oversaw the construction of a $18.7 million dollar instructional lab building. By 2007, the college constructed four campus buildings. Duncan stepped down in June 2008 and was succeeded by Kathleen Hetherington.

== Personal life ==
Duncan died on February 10, 2022, at the age of 80.
