= Deep Creek Lake State Park =

State park in Garrett County, Maryland

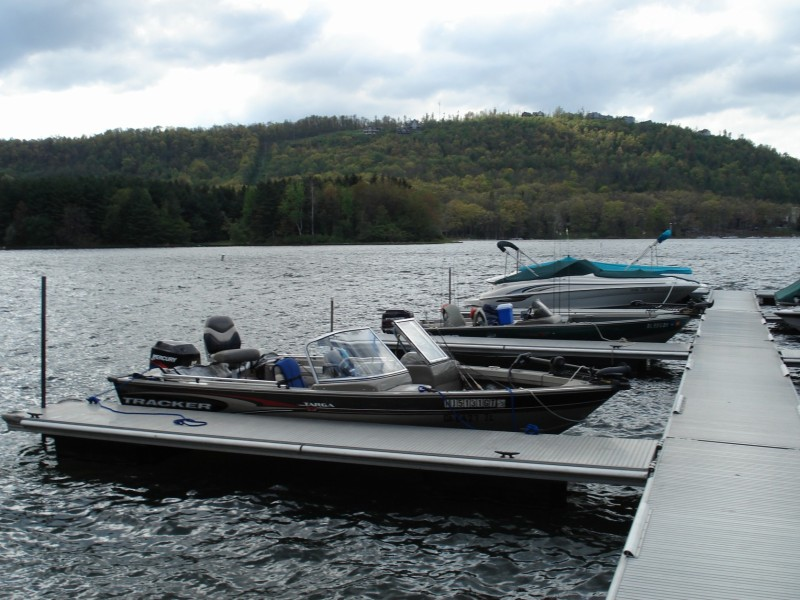

- Location within Maryland
- Location: Garrett County, Maryland, United States
- Nearest city: Frostburg, Maryland
- Coordinates: 39°31′30″N 79°18′18″W
- Area: 1,169 acres (473 ha)
- Elevation: 2,461 ft (750 m)
- Established: 1959
- Administrator: Maryland Department of Natural Resources
- Designation: Maryland state park
- Website: Official website

Deep Creek Lake State Park is a Maryland state park occupying more than 1,100 acres (450 ha) on the northeast side of Deep Creek Lake in Garrett County, Maryland, in the United States. The park features water activities, camping facilities, and recreational trails and is located about 18 miles (29 km) south of Interstate 68 on U.S. Route 219.

== History ==
Although settlers arrived in the area in the 1700s, it was the massive logging operations of the 20th century that stripped the land of its virgin forest. The park's forest of oaks and hickories was regenerated from the original timber stand.

The Deep Creek Lake reservoir was created on a tributary of the Youghiogheny River with the completion of the Deep Creek Dam by the Pennsylvania Electric Company in 1925. The state took charge of recreation on the lake in 1980, then purchased the land underlying the lake and buffer zone properties for $17 million in 2000.

In September 2010, the Appalachian Regional Commission provided $20,000 in funding for a study of potential development at Deep Creek Lake. An official tourism website promoting Deep Creek Lake was launched soon after by the Garrett County Chamber of Commerce.

== Activities and amenities ==
Lake activities include motor boating, water skiing, swimming, fishing, and canoeing. A campground has 112 campsites, 26 of which have electricity. Trails are used for hiking and mountain biking. The park's 6,000-square-foot (560 m^{2}) Discovery Center offers exhibits on local plants and wildlife, including the American black bears occasionally seen in the campground, the lake and its watershed, conservation issues, and local coal and logging activities in addition to the daily educational programs about nature and the environment presented by naturalists, rangers, and volunteers.

=== Johnny's Bait House ===
Johnny's Bait House was a business and facility that operated on the shore of Deep Creek Lake from 1955 to 2003. It was owned and operated by Johnny Marple and his wife Elaine. Johnny promoted and supported the fishing industry at Deep Creek Lake. In the early years, Johnny's was open year-round, supporting all fishing, including ice fishing, but eventually started closing during the winter months. Johnny's provided the Deep Creek Lake Fishing Report to the Maryland Department of Natural Resources and many publications such as The Washington Post, Baltimore Sun, Field and Stream Magazine and Star Democrat.

Johnny's partnered with the Garrett County Promotion Council and founded the Garrett County Fishing Contest, a weekly event that continues to this day. The establishment also managed the official Deep Creek Lake Fishing records through 2003. During that time, multiple Maryland state freshwater fishing record catches were registered. Johnny assisted the State of Maryland Department of Natural Resources in the monitoring of fish population and the registration of fish tagged for population studies. Many items from the collection of mounted fish from that time period are still on display in the Discovery Center of the Deep Creek Lake State Park.
