= Maryland Junior College Athletic Conference =

- Association: NJCAA
- Founded: 1960s
- Commissioner: Greg Witkop
- Sports fielded: 17; men's: 8; women's: 9
- No. of teams: 17
- Headquarters: Baltimore, Maryland
- Region: Maryland – NJCAA Region 20
- Official website: www.mdjuco.org

The Maryland Junior College Athletic Conference (MD JUCO) is a member conference of the National Junior College Athletic Association (NJCAA). It belongs to Region XX (20) of the NJCAA. Chartered in the late 1960s, the MD JUCO is composed of 17 community colleges in the U.S. State of Maryland.

== Member schools ==
=== Current members ===
The MD JUCO currently has 17 full members, all of which are public schools:

Institution	Location (Note: All cities are located within the State of Maryland.)	Founded	Affiliation	Enrollment	Nickname	Joined	Colors
Allegany College of Maryland	Cumberland	1961	Public	18,000	Trojans	?	
Anne Arundel Community College	Arnold	1961	Public	50,000	Riverhawks	?	
Baltimore City Community College	Baltimore	1947	Public	7,000	Panthers	?	
Carroll Community College	Westminster	1976	Public	8,000	Lynx	?	
Cecil College	North East	1968	Public	10,000	Eagles	?	
Chesapeake College	Wye Mills	1965	Public	2,700	Skipjacks	?	
Community College of Baltimore County at Catonsville (CCBC at Catonsville)	Catonsville	1957	Public	30,000	Cardinals	?	
Community College of Baltimore County at Dundalk (CCBC at Dundalk)	Dundalk	1971	Public	20,000	Lions	?	
Community College of Baltimore County at Essex (CCBC at Essex)	Essex	1957	Public	20,000	Knights	?	
Frederick Community College	Frederick	1957	Public	6,500	Cougars	?	
Garrett College	McHenry	1966	Public	6,000	Lakers	?	
Hagerstown Community College	Hagerstown	1946	Public	10,000	Hawks	?	
Harford Community College	Bel Air	1957	Public	10,000	Fighting Owls	?	
Howard Community College	Columbia	1966	Public	29,000	Dragons	?	
Montgomery College	Rockville	1946	Public	60,000	Raptors	?	
Prince George's Community College	Largo	1958	Public	40,000	Owls	?	
College of Southern Maryland	La Plata	1958	Public	25,000	Hawks	?	

== Sports ==
The MD JUCO offers 17 sports, 8 men's and 9 women's.

Sport	Men's	Women's
Baseball	Yes	No
Basketball	Yes	Yes
Cheerleading	No	Yes
Cross country	Yes	Yes
Golf	Yes	No
Lacrosse	Yes	Yes
Soccer	Yes	Yes
Softball	No	Yes
Tennis	Yes	Yes
Track & field	Yes	Yes
Volleyball	No	Yes

Men's Sponsored Sports by School
School	Basketball	Lacrosse	Tennis	Soccer	Cross Country	Track & Field	Baseball	Golf	Total Sports
Allegany	✓	✗	✗	✓	✗	✗	✓	✓	4
Anne Arundel	✓	✓	✗	✓	✗	✗	✓	✓	5
Baltimore City	✓	✗	✗	✗	✓	✗	✗	✗	2
Cecil	✓	✓	✗	✓	✗	✗	✓	✓	5
Chesapeake	✓	✗	✗	✓	✗	✗	✓	✗	3
Catonsville	✓	✓	✗	✓	✗	✗	✓	✗	4
Dundalk	✓	✗	✗	✗	✗	✗	✓	✗	2
Essex	✓	✓	✗	✓	✗	✗	✓	✗	4
Frederick	✓	✗	✗	✓	✗	✗	✓	✗	3
Garrett	✓	✗	✗	✗	✓	✗	✓	✓	4
Hagerstown	✓	✗	✗	✓	✓	✓	✓	✗	5
Harford	✓	✓	✓	✓	✓	✗	✓	✓	7
Howard	✓	✓	✗	✓	✓	✓	✗	✗	5
Mountgomery	✓	✗	✓	✓	✗	✓	✓	✗	5
Prince George's	✓	✗	✗	✓	✗	✓	✓	✗	4
Southern Maryland	✓	✓	✗	✓	✗	✗	✓	✓	5
Total Sports	16	7	2	13	5	4	14	6	67

Women's Sponsored Sports by School
School	Basketball	Lacrosse	Tennis	Soccer	Cross Country	Track & Field	Softball	Volleyball	Cheerleading	Total Sports
Allegany	✓	✗	✗	✗	✗	✗	✓	✓	✗	3
Anne Arundel	✓	✓	✗	✓	✓	✗	✓	✓	✗	6
Baltimore City	✓	✗	✓	✗	✓	✗	✓	✗	✗	4
Cecil	✓	✗	✗	✓	✗	✗	✓	✓	✗	4
Chesapeake	✓	✗	✗	✗	✗	✗	✓	✓	✗	3
Catonsville	✓	✓	✗	✓	✓	✓	✓	✓	✗	7
Dundalk	✓	✗	✗	✗	✓	✓	✓	✗	✗	4
Essex	✓	✓	✗	✓	✓	✓	✗	✓	✗	6
Frederick	✓	✗	✗	✓	✗	✗	✓	✓	✗	4
Garrett	✓	✗	✗	✗	✗	✗	✓	✓	✗	3
Hagerstown	✓	✗	✗	✗	✓	✗	✓	✓	✗	4
Harford	✓	✓	✓	✓	✓	✗	✓	✓	✗	7
Howard	✓	✓	✗	✓	✓	✓	✗	✓	✗	6
Mountgomery	✓	✗	✓	✓	✗	✓	✓	✓	✓	5
Prince George's	✓	✗	✗	✓	✗	✓	✓	✗	✓	5
Southern Maryland	✓	✗	✗	✓	✓	✗	✓	✓	✗	5
Total Sports	16	5	3	10	9	6	14	13	2	76

== Awards ==
The MD JUCO offers two program awards, The Presidents' Cup and The Sportsmanship Award.

The Presidents’ Cup is a points based award. A school will earn points based on its final standings in a sport, with first place earning the most points, and the number of points earned being relative to the number of schools sponsoring the sport. The school with the most points at the end of the school year wins the cup. As of the 2010-11 season, the cup is awarded to men's and women's sports separately.

The Sportsmanship Award is awarded to the school with the best sportsmanship at the end of each school year. The recipient is elected by representatives from each school.

The MD JUCO has two academic awards, The Student-Athlete of the Month Award, which is given to an individual man and woman athlete each month, and the MD JUCO All-Academic Team, in which student-athletes with a GPA of over 3.6 are elected too.

The MD JUCO has two All-MD JUCO teams (first team and second team) for individual athletes in each sport.

== Championships ==
The MD JUCO schools can qualify to compete in the NJCAA Region 20 tournament championships for each respective sport. The MD JUCO teams also face off against their fellow Region XX conference, the Pennsylvania Collegiate Athletic Association in the tournament.

Once a team wins the regional tournament, they go on to the NJCAA national tournament. Schools from the MD JUCO have won a total of 30 national championships.

School	Number of Titles	Sport
CCBC Essex	9	Men's Soccer: 1974; Field Hockey: 1977, 1978, 1980; Women's Soccer: 1983, 1993; Men's Lacrosse: 1991, 2004; Baseball: 1992
Harford	5	Field Hockey: 1995; Men's Lacrosse: 2023, 2024, 2025, 2026
Anne Arundel	4	Men's Lacrosse: 1998; Softball: 2003; Women's Lacrosse: 2006, 2007
CCBC Catonsville	4	Women's Lacrosse: 2004, 2005, 2008; Women's Soccer: 2008
Montgomery	4	Golf: 1990; Women's Tennis: 2001, 2006; Women's Soccer: 2011
CCBC Dundalk	1	Men's Basketball: 2000
Cecil	1	Men's Basketball: 2006
Hagerstown	1	Men's Marathon: 2000
Prince George's	1	Coneisha Smith (Women's Track & Field - 400 meters): 2012

== See also ==
- Western Pennsylvania Collegiate Conference, also in Region 20 of NJCAA
