= Deep Creek Dam =

Earth and rockwall dam in Maryland, US

- Location within Maryland
- Country: United States
- Location: Oakland, Maryland
- Coordinates: 39.5093°N 79.3908°W
- Status: Operational
- Construction began: 1925
- Opening date: 1928

Dam and spillways
- Type of dam: earth and rockwall dam
- Impounds: Youghiogheny River

Power Station
- Operator: Constellation Energy
- Commission date: 1928
- Type: Run-of-the-river
- Turbines: 2 x 20 MWe
- Installed capacity: 40 MWe

The Deep Creek Dam located about 8 miles north of Oakland, Maryland, consists of an earth and rockwall dam across a tributary of the Youghiogheny River that was completed in 1925 by the Pennsylvania Electric Company. Construction of the dam created the Deep Creek Lake. The twin water turbine 20 MW hydroelectric plant, acquired by Brookfield Renewable Power, Inc., in 2005, became operational in 1928. The Federal Energy Regulatory Commission licensed the dam and hydroelectric plant in 1968, but released the licensing to Maryland effective 1994. Under a 1994 agreement with the Maryland Department of Natural Resources, the dam is operated to control waterflows to maintain the river temperature and dissolved oxygen levels to assist downstream fisheries with the intent of increasing the number of trout as well as to enable recreational whitewater activities (kayaking, canoeing, and commercial rafting) on the Upper Youghiogheny River into which the dam releases. The Maryland Department of the Environment water appropriations permit under which the dam operates was last renewed on September 2, 2020.

== See also ==
- History of Deep Creek Lake, Maryland
