= Prince George's Community College =

Public college in Largo, Maryland, US

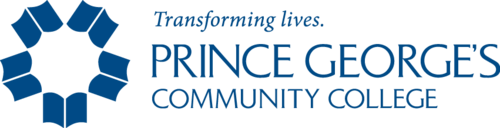
- Motto: Transforming Lives.
- Type: Public community college
- Established: 1958; 68 years ago
- Accreditation: Middle States Commission on Higher Education
- Academic affiliations: CUWMA
- President: Dr. Falecia D. Williams
- Academic staff: 914 (Spring 2023)
- Students: 10,577 (all undergraduate) (Spring 2023)
- Location: Largo, Maryland, U.S. 38°53′19″N 76°49′29″W
- Campus: Urban
- Sporting affiliations: NJCAA – MDJUCO
- Mascot: Owls
- Website: www.pgcc.edu

Prince George's Community College (PGCC) is a public community college in Largo in Prince George's County, Maryland. The college serves Prince George's County and surrounding areas, including Washington, D.C.

== History ==
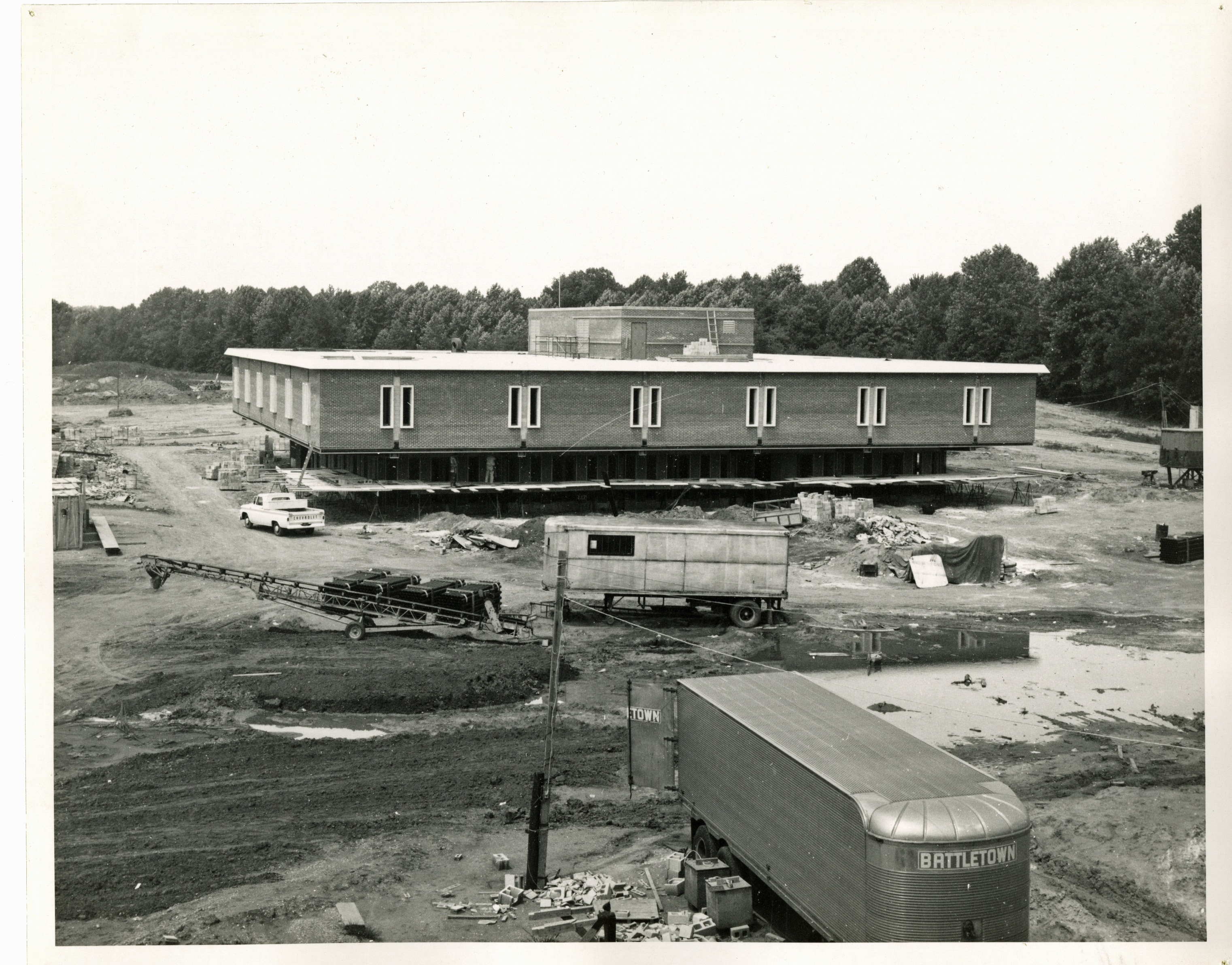
Largo campus construction, 1968

Founded in 1958, Prince George's Community College came into existence because there was perceived to be a need for educational opportunities for the residents of the county, particularly those who were still in the K–12 grades of the public schools in the late 1950s.

Classes commenced at Suitland High School, with a student body of 185; thus, the college celebrated 50 years of service in 2008. The college was the first educational institution to integrate in the county, and today serves more African-American students than any other post-secondary institution in the state of Maryland. In 1967, the college moved to its permanent location in Largo, Maryland, where it has grown to an enrollment of nearly 40,000 students. During the past decades, a handful of buildings on the campus has grown to 22 facilities.

In spring 2007, the college selected its first female president, Charlene Dukes.

== Academics ==
Prince George's Community College offers over 100 fields of study through its academic, workforce development, continuing education, and personal enrichment programs. More specifically, PGCC has 68 academic degree programs and 34 professional certificate program, many of which feature distance learning options. The college awards Associate of Arts, Associate of Science, and Associate of Arts in Teaching degrees. In addition, PGCC allows students to transfer to a four-year college or university.

=== Accreditation ===
Prince George's Community College is accredited by the Middle States Commission on Higher Education. Its education, engineering, nursing, radiology, paramedic and respiratory therapy programs have specialized accreditation.

They also participate in dual-enrollment for high school junior and senior students from PGCPS. Students can take courses while still in high school, earning both high school and college credit.

== Community focus ==
The school hosts a number of special programs that address the needs and interests of county residents. These include the Book Bridge Project, the Center for Business and Industry Training and the Children's Developmental Clinic. College meeting rooms and recreational facilities are also available for use by the public. These facilities include the Robert I. Bickford Natatorium, which is open to individuals and groups. More than 1,000 events sponsored by community organizations are held at the college each year.

== Campuses and training facilities ==
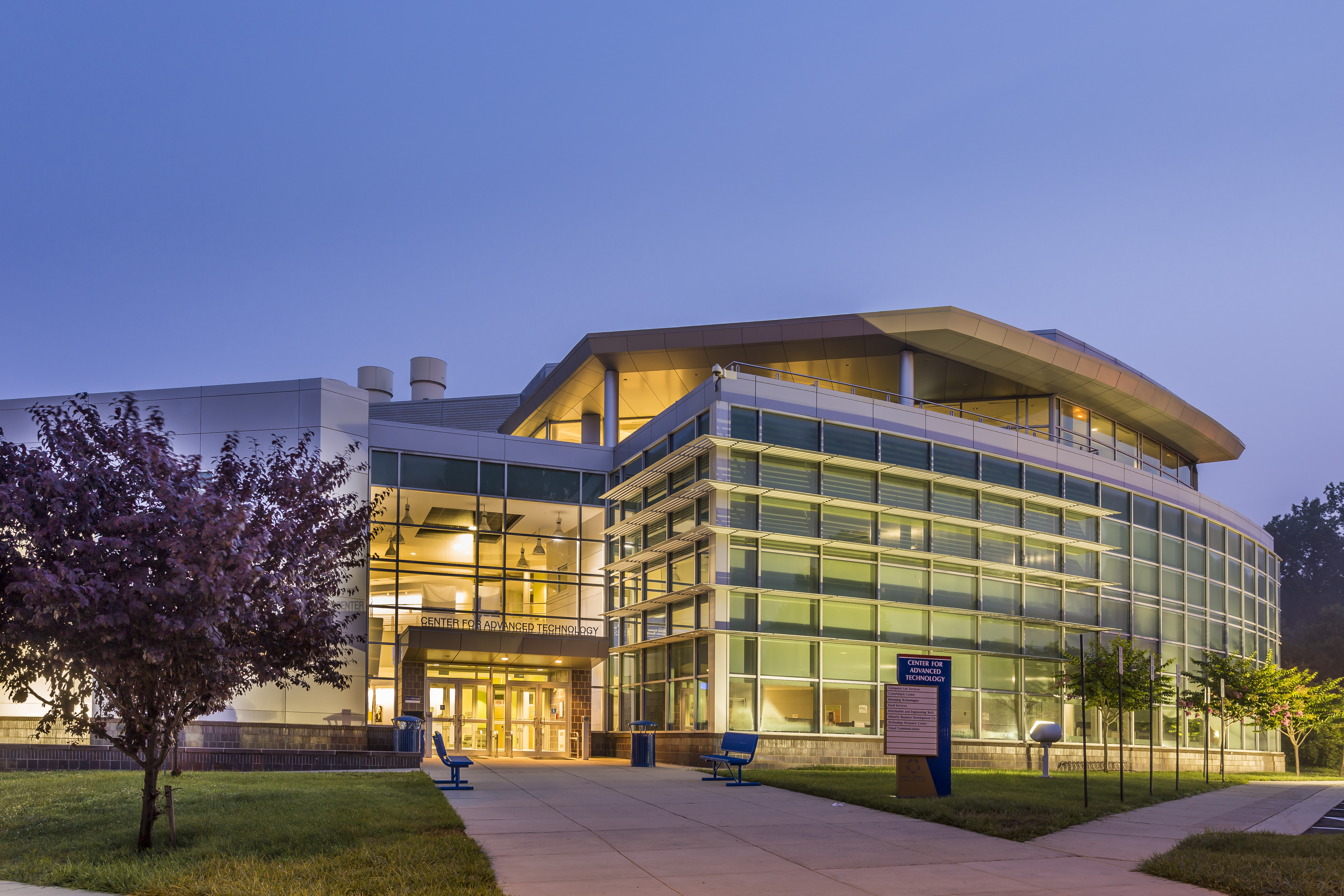
Center for Advanced Technology, Largo campus

The main campus is located in Largo, Maryland, which opened in 1967. PGCC operates extension centers at University Town Center in Hyattsville, and Andrews Air Force Base as well as Skilled Trades Center in Camp Springs. The college shares an extension center with Howard Community College in Laurel called the Laurel College Center.

Within the last six years, the college has seen the completion of two new modern facilities: the Center for Advanced Technology and the Center for Health Studies. There are several more developments underway including a brand new Culinary Arts Center, renovation and expansion of Lanham Hall, the Queen Anne Arts Education Center, a renovation of the Rennie Forum auditorium, and a health and wellness center.

== Student life ==
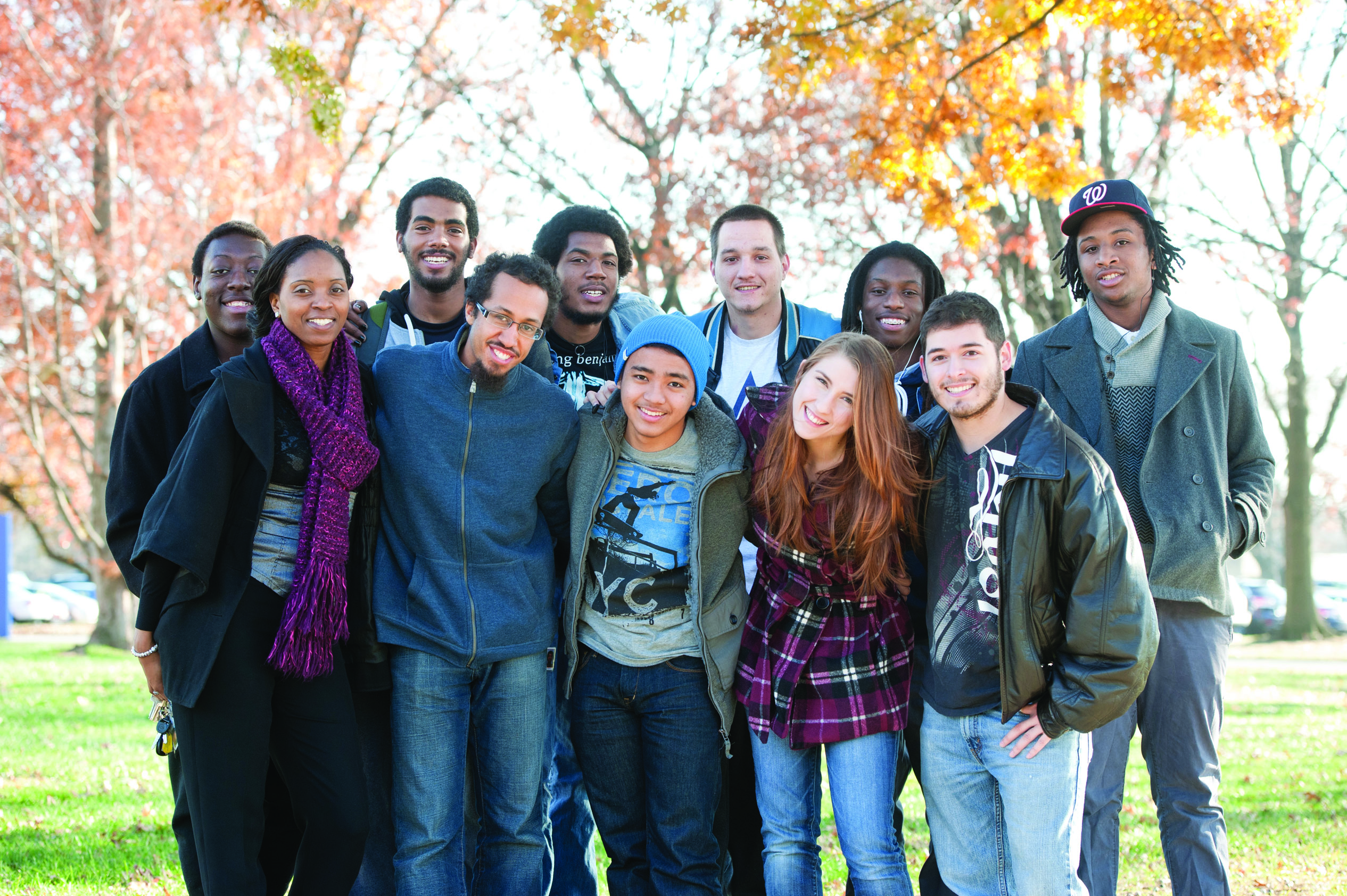
Prince George's Community College students

PGCC serves approximately 40,000 students.

The college also offers many student services and resources like the study rooms, print services, and computer labs with tutoring. It also includes many places where students can hang out: the student lounge and indoor and outdoor gathering spaces.

=== Clubs and organizations ===
The college has 43 student clubs and organizations representing a wide variety of interest, including an Active Seniors Club, the African Student Union, a Caribbean Student Association, an Honors Society, Intercollegiate Athletics, Improvisational Theatre, a Muslim Student Association, a chapter of Phi Theta Kappa, and a Student Governance Board to name a few. The school mascot and also the name of the student newspaper is The Owl.

== Intercollegiate athletics ==
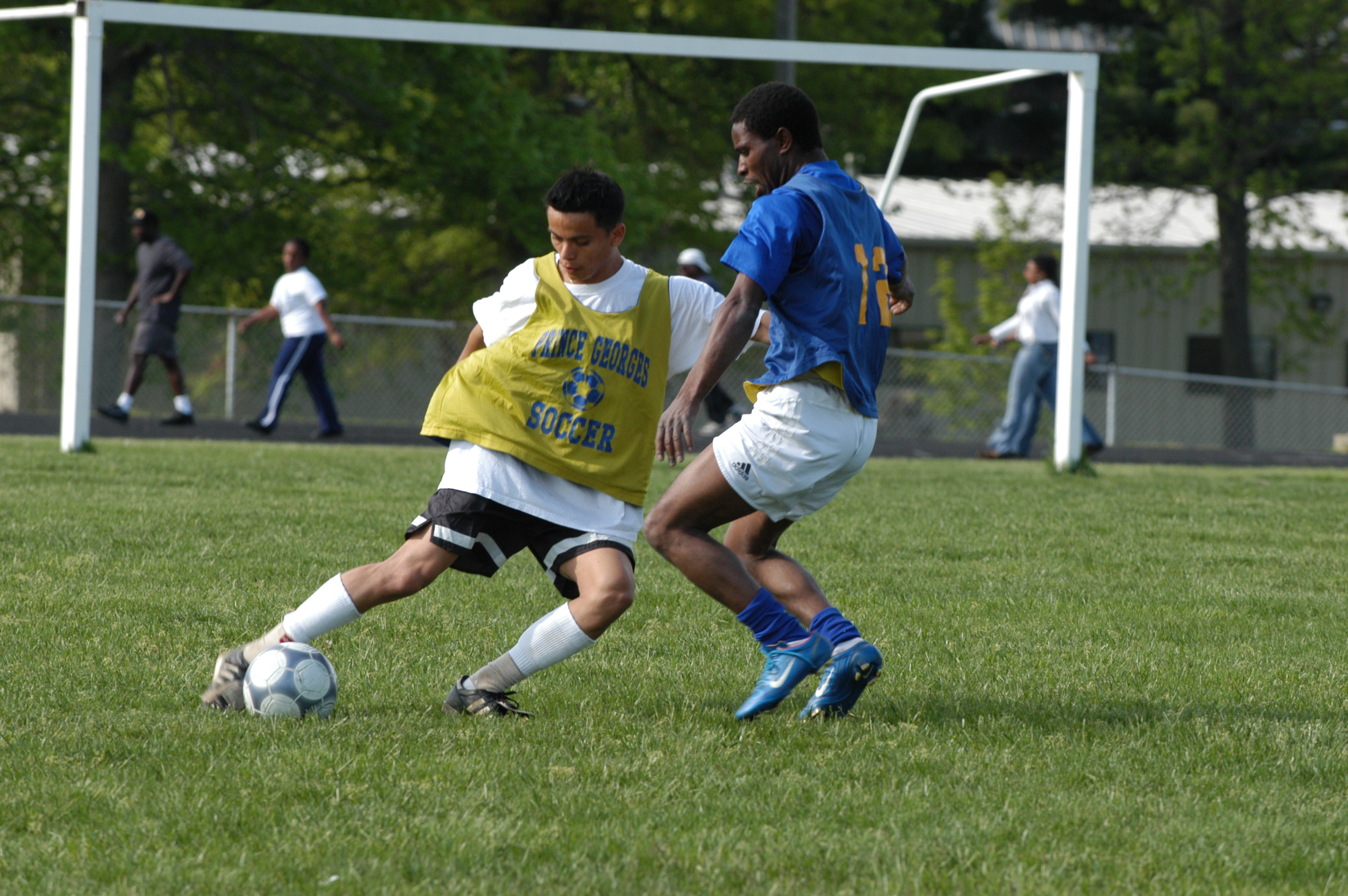
Prince George's Community College men's soccer

Prince George's Community College is a member of the National Junior College Athletic Association (NJCAA) and Maryland Junior College Athletic Conference (MD JUCO). Ten intercollegiate teams represent the college in the NJCAA and MD JUCO, including:

- men's soccer
- women's soccer
- women's basketball
- men's basketball
- men's cross country
- women's cross country
- men's baseball
- women's softball
- men's track & field
- women's track & field
- cheerleading

== Notable alumni ==
- Peter Bergman, actor
- Reginald Dwayne Betts, poet, teacher
- Frank Cho, cartoonist
- Fred Funk, professional golfer
- Ginuwine, singer-songwriter
- Karen Handel, former member of Congress
- Andrea Harrison, politician
- Cathy L. Lanier, Chief of the Metropolitan Police Department of the District of Columbia
- Nino Paid, rapper
- Rosa Salazar, actress
- Jan C. Scruggs, Vietnam Veterans Memorial Fund founder
- Tulu, professional soccer player
- Troy Weaver, NBA executive

== Presidents ==
- Charlene Dukes 2007 to 2020
