= Wisp Ski Resort =

Ski area in Maryland, United States

Wisp Resort
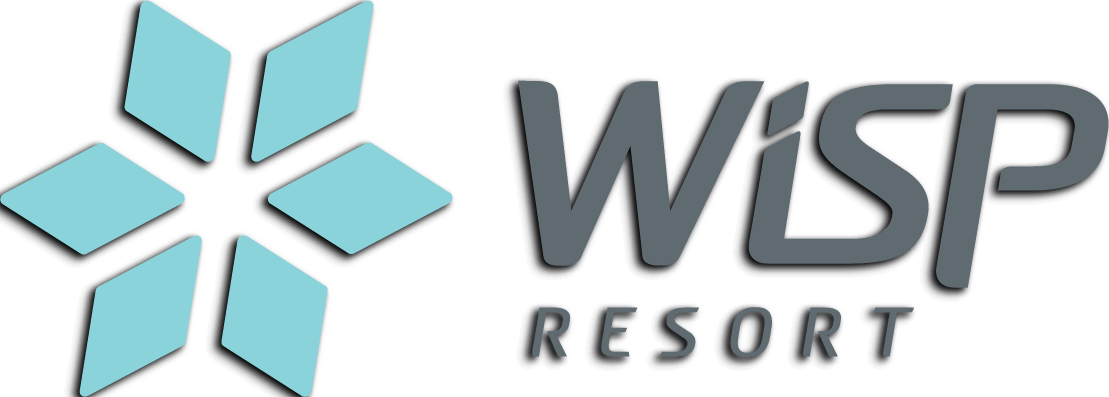
- Interactive map of Wisp Resort
- Location: Garrett County, Maryland
- Nearest city: McHenry, Maryland; Oakland, Maryland
- Coordinates: 39°33′29″N 79°21′47″W
- Vertical: 700 ft - (213 m)
- Top elevation: 3,115 ft (949 m)
- Base elevation: 2,415 ft (736 m)
- Skiable area: 132 acres (0.53 km^{2})
- Trails: 34
- Longest run: 1.5 miles (2.4 km)
- Lift system: 12 chairlifts (2 quad, 5 triple, 4 conveyor, 1 surface)
- Lift capacity: 12,600 / hr
- Snowfall: 100 in. - (254 cm)
- Snowmaking: 90%
- Night skiing: 90%
- Website: wispresort.com

Wisp Resort is the only four-season downhill ski resort in Maryland. It is located near Deep Creek Lake in the town of McHenry in Garrett County, Maryland, near the border of West Virginia and Western Pennsylvania/Pittsburgh Metropolitan Area. It is located almost 10 miles northwest of Oakland, 32 miles west of Cumberland, Maryland, 2 hours from Pittsburgh, and 3 hours from Baltimore and Washington, DC. The ski slopes are located on Marsh Mountain. The closest ski resorts to Wisp are Seven Springs Mountain Resort, about 48 miles North, and Hidden Valley Resort (Pennsylvania), around 50 miles North of Wisp. Wisp Resort was founded by Mr.Helmuth M.G. Heise and is currently owned by Pacific Group Resorts, Inc.

== History ==
Originally called Marsh Mountain, Wisp first opened up in the winter of 1955-1956 and is still one of the earliest southern ski areas to exist.

By 1960, Marsh Mountain had a pomalift and four rope tows, and the ski season was from approximately December 15 to March 15.

In the winter of 1966-1967, the first snowmaking was active on the mountain. During the 1970's Wisp resort grew to 16 slopes and added more lights, snowmakers, and chairlifts. A hotel was also added during this time period at the base of the slopes.

In 2001, Deep Creek Development purchased Wisp Resort. The Bear Claw Snow Tubing Park was added in 2001. In 2003, the Main Lodge was renovated and expanded by 11,000 feet. In 2007, a white water rafting course was added. Since DCD purchased the resort in 2001, there have been over $30 million in renovations and capital investment added to the Resort.

The newly remodeled hotel in 2016 features 102 suites and 67 guest rooms and is a non-smoking establishment. It is a four-season establishment and offers recreational activities year-round including 2 18-hole golf courses; Lodestone Golf Course and Fantasy Valley Golf Course. The resort is located near three state parks and three state forests within 30 miles. These include Deep Creek Lake, Swallow Falls and Big Run State Parks, and Garrett, Potomac, and Savage River State Forests.

== Other Seasons ==
Wisp Resort is Maryland’s only four-season ski resort. Wisp has different activities for each season. Summer activities include: 3 canopy tour zip lines, kayak and paddleboard rentals, mountain biking, segway tours, archery, and orienteering. The resort also includes a Mountain coaster which is a hybrid of an alpine slide and a roller coaster. Coaster cars go 3,500 feet downhill over 350 vertical feet on the eastern side of Wisp Mountain.

== The Mountain ==
Wisp Resort is seasonal and receives on average 100 inches of snow each year; however, they do make their own snow in order to make the season last longer. Offering different trails for each skill level, Wisp is accessible to all people of all skiing and snowboarding abilities, even offering lessons to beginner skiers and snowboarders. Night skiing is also available on 90% of the terrain Tuesdays thru Saturdays. According to DCSki.com, Wisp was voted runner-up in the category "best year-round resort in the Mid-Atlantic."

== Slopes ==
Wisp Resort has a total of 34 slopes and trails. The Front Side Trails include five trails marked "easy", ten trails marked "more difficult", and five trails marked "most difficult." East Ridge Trails include one "more difficult" trail and five "most difficult" trails. North Camp Trails include five "easy" trails, three "more difficult" trails, and one "most difficult" trail. The resort also includes a tubing park, an ice skating rink, and a mountain coaster. The nordic center closed in 2020.

== Snowfall ==
Wisp Resort receives a decent amount of snowfall throughout the season, and in recent years the heaviest snow has begun around January and has ended late, near mid-March. The base of the slopes is made by snow machines, along with touch-ups throughout the season and making slopes skiable for those on the mountain. Onthesnow.com shows total snowfall, maximum base depth, largest snowfall, total snowfall days, and average base depth at Wisp resort; the website includes a calendar view to show daily snowfall data for the current ski season.

== Runs ==
Wisp has one bowl, Bobcat Bowl, which opens according to natural snowfall.
