= Maxine D. Jones =

American historian

Maxine Deloris Jones is an American historian. She is a professor of history at Florida State University. Jones co-authored a book on African American history in Florida and another on Talladega College. She was the principal author of a report on the Rosewood Massacre for the Florida Legislature.

Jones completed her undergraduate, graduate, and doctoral studies at Florida State University. The book African Americans in Florida received an award from the Florida Historical Society in 1994.

== Selected works ==
- Rosewood Massacre report for the Florida Legislature, principal author
- Jones, Maxine Deloris; Richardson, Joe Martin (1990). Talladega College: The First Century. University of Alabama Press. ISBN 978-0-8173-0472-0.
- Jones, Maxine Deloris; McCarthy, Kevin M. (1993). African Americans in Florida. Pineapple Press. ISBN 978-1-56164-031-7.
- Jones, Maxine D.; McCarthy, Kevin M. (1993). Teachers' Manual for African Americans in Florida. Pineapple Press. ISBN 978-1-56164-045-4.
- Richardson, Joe M.; Jones, Maxine D. (2009). Education for Liberation: The American Missionary Association and African Americans, 1890 to the Civil Rights Movement. University of Alabama Press. ISBN 978-0-8173-1657-0.
