= Kathleen Hetherington =

American college administrator

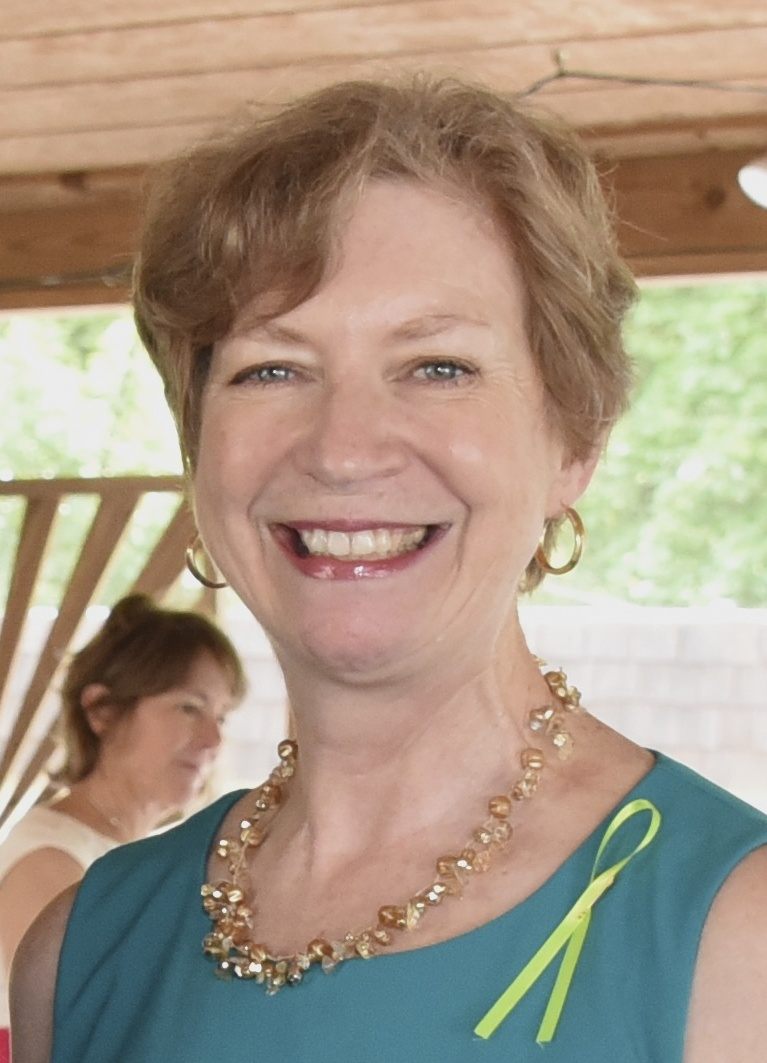
Kathleen Hetherington (2015)

Kathleen Carey Hetherington is an American academic administrator. She was the president of Howard Community College (HCC) from 2007 to 2021.

== Early life and education ==
Kathleen Carey is a native of Philadelphia. She has five younger siblings. Hetherington earned an Associate in Applied Science from the Community College of Philadelphia. She completed a Bachelor of Social Science from Pennsylvania State University. She earned a master of science from Villanova University and a doctor of education from Widener University.

== Career ==
Hetherington was a staff member for 22 years at the Community College of Philadelphia before leaving in 1999. She was the co-owner of an ice cream shop in South Philadelphia. The same year, she became the vice president of student services at HCC. In 2007, Hetherington became the president of HCC. She retired on October 1, 2021.

== Personal life ==
Kathleen Carey met her husband, John Hetherington in their college Spanish 101 class. The professor had paired the two to share a textbook. In 2006, she competed in the Marine Corps Marathon.
