= Deep Creek Lake =

Man-made lake in Maryland, United States

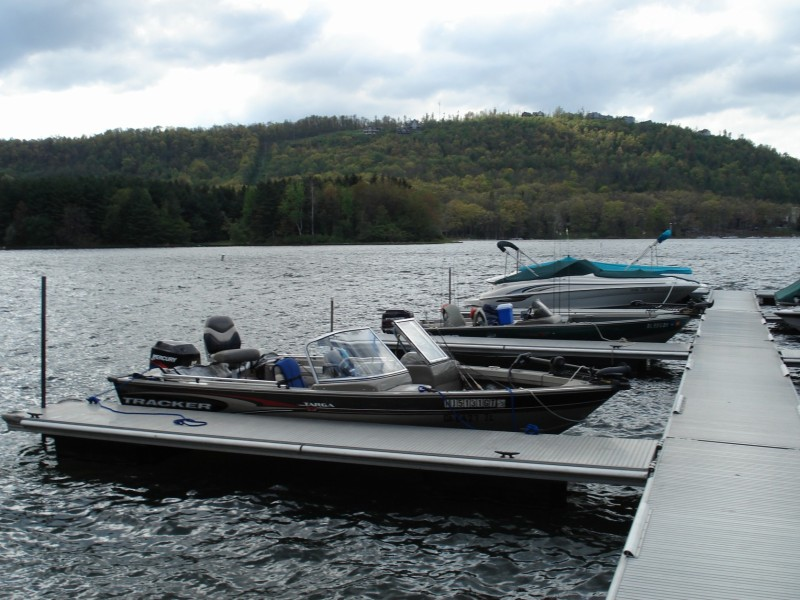
- Boats docked at a Deep Creek Lake dock in May 2008

- Location within Maryland Location within the United States
- Location: Garrett County, Maryland
- Coordinates: 39°30′34″N 79°23′28″W
- Lake type: Reservoir
- Primary inflows: Deep Creek, Meadow Mountain Run, Cherry Creek, Green Glade Run
- Primary outflows: Deep Creek
- Catchment area: 64.7 sq mi (168 km^{2})
- Basin countries: United States
- Max. length: 11.25 mi (18.11 km)
- Max. width: 1.13 mi (1.82 km)
- Surface area: 3,628 acres (14.68 km^{2})
- Max. depth: 75 ft (23 m)
- Water volume: 106,000 acre⋅ft (0.131 km^{3})
- Shore length^{1}: 69 mi (111 km)
- Surface elevation: 2,461 ft (750 m)
- Settlements: McHenry, Maryland
- ^{1} Shore length is not a well-defined measure.

Deep Creek Lake is an artificial reservoir in the U.S. state of Maryland. It has an area of 3,900 acres (16 km^{2}), a shoreline length of 69 miles (111 km), and a volume of 106,000 acre⋅ft (0.131 km^{3}). The lake is home to a wide variety of aquatic life, such as freshwater fish and aquatic birds. Along with the nearby Wisp Ski Resort, the lake is a popular regional vacation and tourism destination. Deep Creek Lake State Park is on the northeast side. There is also the Deep Creek Lake Natural Resources Management Area.

== History ==
The lake is a result of the Youghiogheny Hydroelectric Company hydroelectric project on Deep Creek in the 1920s. Deep Creek Dam, located about 8 miles (13 km) north of Oakland, Maryland, consists of an earth and rock wall dam across a tributary of the Youghiogheny River. Construction of the dam began in 1923 and was completed in 1925. The hydroelectric plant became operational at 4 p.m. on May 26, 1925. The state of Maryland purchased the lake in 2000 from the Pennsylvania Electric Company, and Deep Creek Lake State Park provides public access to the lake.

== Fishing ==
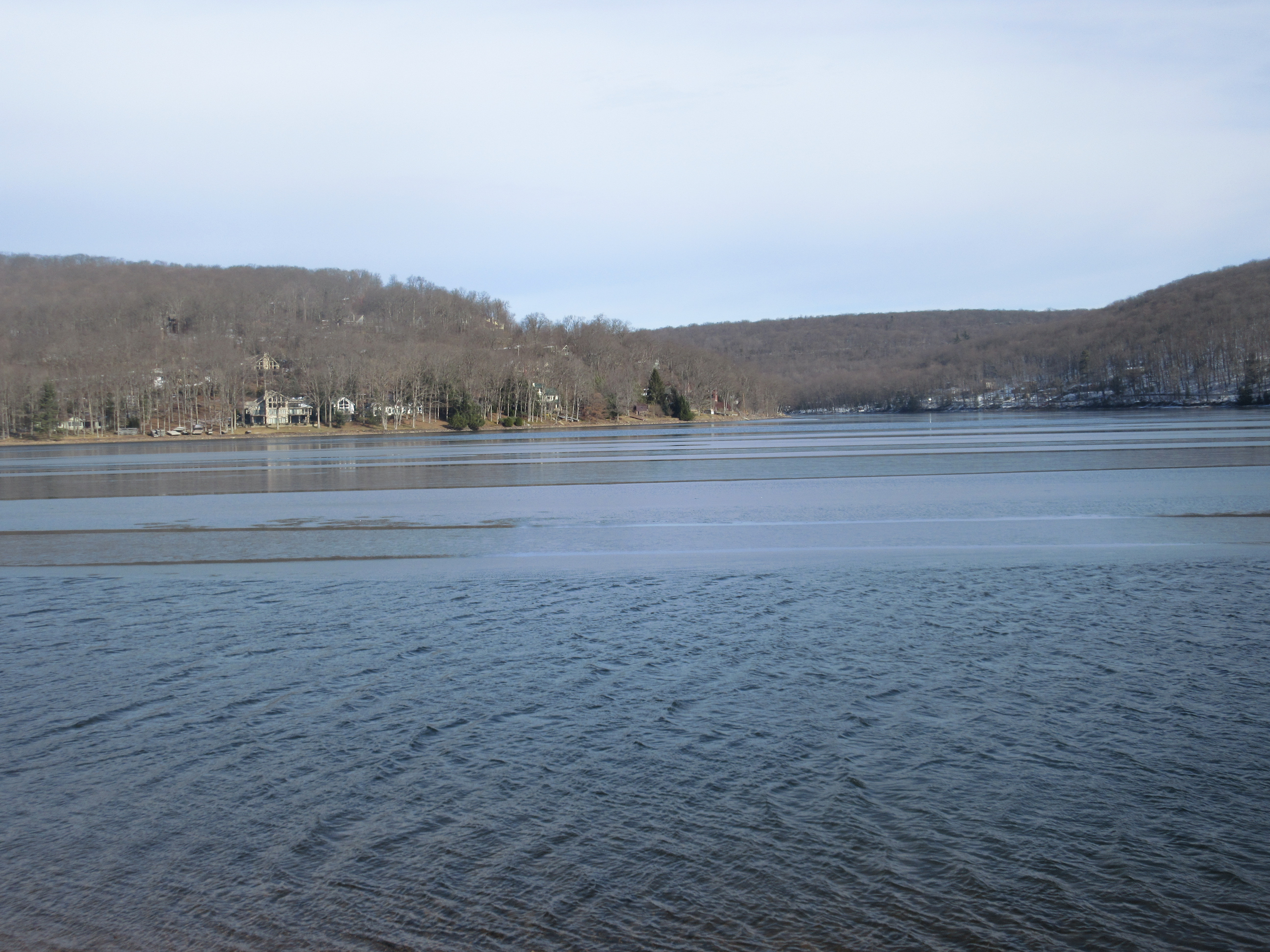
Deep Creek Lake

Fish commonly caught by anglers include:

- largemouth bass
- smallmouth bass
- rock bass
- northern pike
- muskellunge
- walleye
- yellow perch
- chain pickerel
- black crappie
- bluegill
- redear sunfish
- common carp
- shiners
- bluntnose minnow
- fathead minnow

== Climate ==
Deep Creek Lake has a humid continental climate (Köppen Dfb).

Climate data for Sines Deep Creek, Maryland, 1991–2020 normals, 1928-2020 extremes: 2040ft (622m)
Month	Jan	Feb	Mar	Apr	May	Jun	Jul	Aug	Sep	Oct	Nov	Dec	Year
Record high °F (°C)	73 (23)	74 (23)	82 (28)	87 (31)	88 (31)	93 (34)	96 (36)	94 (34)	95 (35)	86 (30)	78 (26)	75 (24)	96 (36)
Mean maximum °F (°C)	54.8 (12.7)	58.4 (14.7)	70.2 (21.2)	77.6 (25.3)	83.7 (28.7)	85.1 (29.5)	87.2 (30.7)	83.1 (28.4)	83.2 (28.4)	75.7 (24.3)	68.6 (20.3)	58.9 (14.9)	87.5 (30.8)
Mean daily maximum °F (°C)	34.0 (1.1)	37.8 (3.2)	46.9 (8.3)	59.3 (15.2)	67.9 (19.9)	74.9 (23.8)	79.0 (26.1)	76.4 (24.7)	71.5 (21.9)	61.1 (16.2)	48.5 (9.2)	38.2 (3.4)	58.0 (14.4)
Daily mean °F (°C)	25.3 (−3.7)	27.7 (−2.4)	35.7 (2.1)	46.5 (8.1)	55.7 (13.2)	63.3 (17.4)	67.6 (19.8)	65.7 (18.7)	59.8 (15.4)	49.8 (9.9)	38.8 (3.8)	29.6 (−1.3)	47.1 (8.4)
Mean daily minimum °F (°C)	16.6 (−8.6)	17.5 (−8.1)	24.4 (−4.2)	33.7 (0.9)	43.5 (6.4)	51.7 (10.9)	56.2 (13.4)	54.9 (12.7)	48.0 (8.9)	38.5 (3.6)	29.0 (−1.7)	21.0 (−6.1)	36.2 (2.3)
Mean minimum °F (°C)	−3.3 (−19.6)	−1.1 (−18.4)	7.7 (−13.5)	20.0 (−6.7)	28.9 (−1.7)	39.3 (4.1)	47.9 (8.8)	45.0 (7.2)	36.4 (2.4)	27.2 (−2.7)	15.5 (−9.2)	8.0 (−13.3)	−4.2 (−20.1)
Record low °F (°C)	−20 (−29)	−23 (−31)	−11 (−24)	11 (−12)	20 (−7)	24 (−4)	35 (2)	35 (2)	22 (−6)	14 (−10)	−8 (−22)	−17 (−27)	−23 (−31)
Average precipitation inches (mm)	4.65 (118)	4.39 (112)	4.67 (119)	4.35 (110)	4.90 (124)	5.67 (144)	5.01 (127)	4.41 (112)	3.29 (84)	3.19 (81)	3.36 (85)	4.64 (118)	52.53 (1,334)
Average snowfall inches (cm)	31.7 (81)	30.7 (78)	16.0 (41)	4.0 (10)	0.1 (0.25)	0.0 (0.0)	0.0 (0.0)	0.0 (0.0)	0.0 (0.0)	2.6 (6.6)	6.2 (16)	19.1 (49)	110.4 (281.85)
Source 1: NOAA(Mc Henry 4.8 SSE Precip/Snowfall)
Source 2: XMACIS2 (2007-2020 snowfall, records & monthly max/mins)

== See also ==
- List of Maryland state parks#Maryland natural resources management areas
