= Howard Community College =

Community college in Columbia, Maryland, U.S.

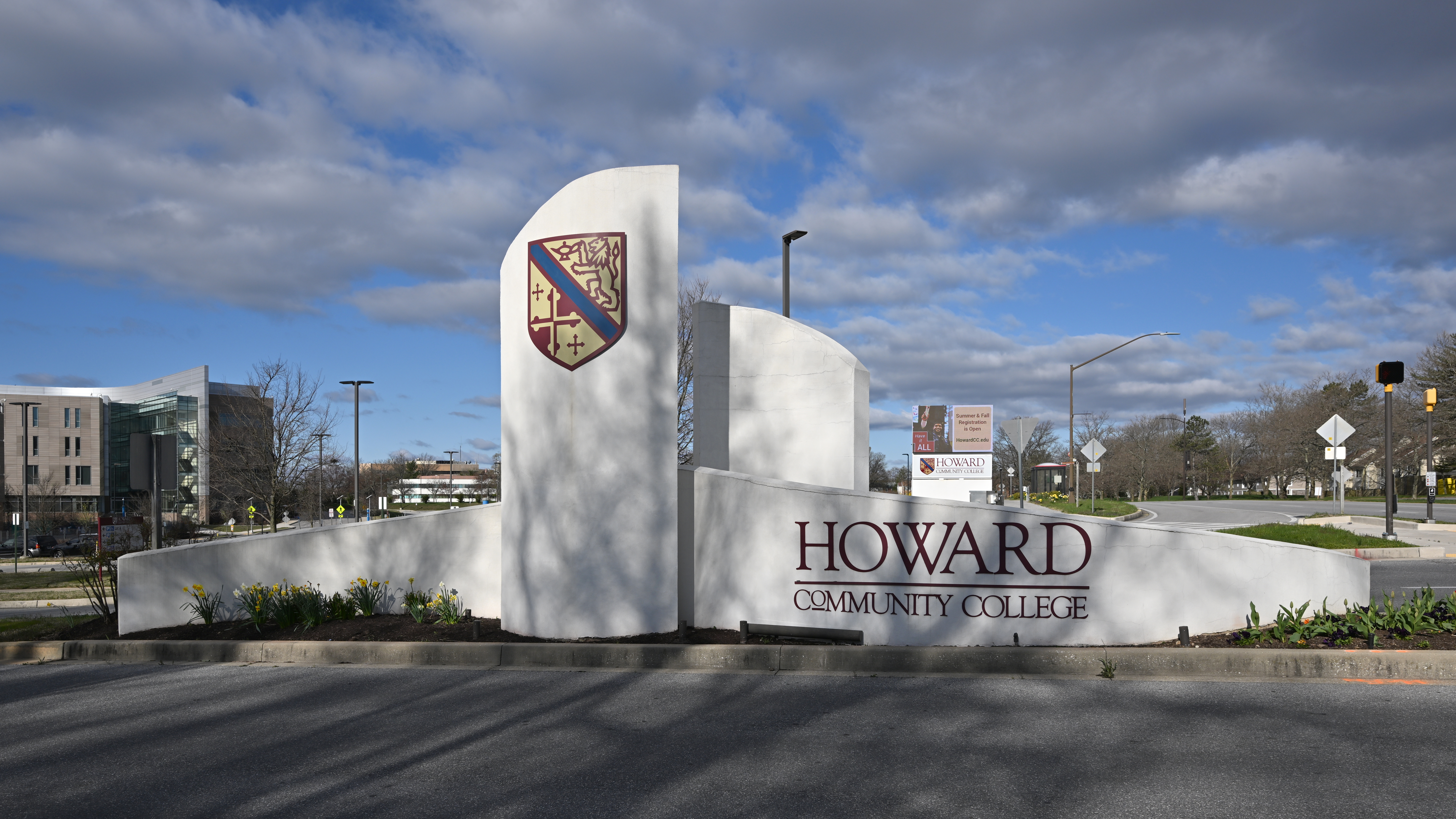
- Motto: Meeting students where they dream
- Type: Public community college
- Established: 1966
- President: Daria Willis
- Faculty: 196 Full-Time and 454 Part-Time (Fall 2022)
- Students: 8,080 (all undergraduate)(Fall 2022)
- Undergraduates: 8,080 (all undergraduate)(Fall 2022)
- Location: Columbia, Maryland, United States; 39°12′45″N 76°52′40″W
- Campus: 120 acres (0.49 km^{2})
- Sporting affiliations: NJCAA; MDJUCO
- Mascot: Dragon
- Website: www.howardcc.edu

Howard Community College (HCC or Howard CC) is a public community college in Columbia, Maryland. It offers classes for credit in more than 100 programs, non-credit classes, and workforce development programs. In addition to the main campus in Columbia, courses are also held at two satellite campuses.

== History ==
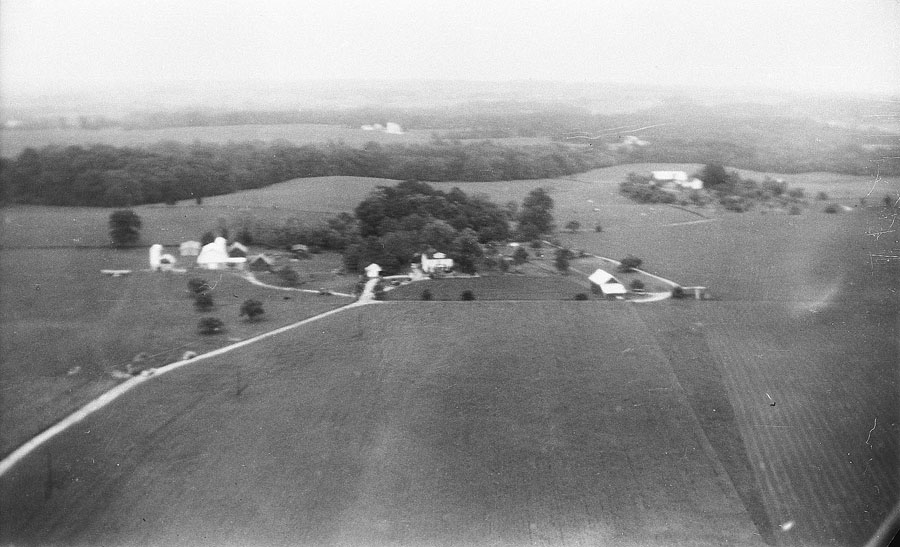
Howard Community College in 1977

In 1966, Howard Community College was founded by the Board of Education in Howard County and formally authorized by the Howard County Commissioners Charles E. Miller, J. Hubert Black, and David W. Force. The board recommended that the college operate under a separate budget than the school system. The first HCC board was drawn from the current state-appointed county school board. HCC was approved as the State of Maryland's 14th community college in late 1967.

The school was built on a prehistoric Native American settlement which became the site of the Dieker farm, which was later inherited by Gustave Basler's (1858–1938) wife Dora Dieker. Alfred Christian Bassler sold his share of his father's 400 acre Cedar Lane farm to Community Research and Development to be the site of the project; the sale included a trade of land in Clarksville off of Shepherd Lane. His family home, barn, granaries, and silos were demolished in 1969. A groundbreaking ceremony in June 1969 began construction on 119 acres (0.48 km^{2}) in the heart of the planned community of Columbia that, at the time, was just beginning to take shape. In October 1970, the first classes took place in a new structure called the Learning Resources Center, now the James Clark Jr. Library Hall, with 10 full-time faculty and just over 600 full-time students attending classes in HCC's nine credit programs.

HCC's first president was Alfred J. Smith Jr, former dean of faculty at Corning Community College, who was hired by HCC in June 1969. In 1973, he signed a five-year contract to remain as president. In 1976, Smith faced scrutiny for accounting expense allowances from the county which funded 35% of operational costs. Dwight Burrill took the role of dean in 1981, serving for seventeen years. In 1980, the Columbia Film Society moved to the HCC performing arts center for weekend movies.

Mary Ellen Duncan became president of the college in 1998, followed by Dr. Kathleen Hetherington in 2007. In September 2015, then-First Lady Michelle Obama visited HCC and attended a panel hosted by the magazine Essence to kick off its second annual college tour that encouraged high school students to continue their education when they graduate as part of Obama's education initiative Reach Higher. In 2019, HCC won the Malcolm Baldrige National Quality Award in the category of education. That same year, the ST and Nursing buildings were remodeled and renamed Academic Commons and Howard Hall, respectively.

On February 5, 2025, HCC staff reported to Maryland legislators that pro-union posters were removed without consent from their office without warning. Union members claim the administration is not in good faith, but the administration denies these claims. Students and staff criticized President Daria Willis for creating a toxic work environment, but Willis maintains support from Howard County Executive Calvin Ball III and Maryland Governor Wes Moore. Three board members resigned without explanation in 2025.

On November 7, 2025, the Howard Community College Faculty Forum Constituency Committee, a committee representing all faculty on campus, sent a letter to the Board of Trustees expressing a vote of no confidence in President Daria Willis' leadership as President of Howard Community College. This vote was in response to a statement from the Board of Trustees dated July 31, 2025, in which the Board of Trustees expressed full confidence in Willis and her leadership. The Faculty Forum Constituency Committee cited the instability of her leadership, a hostile work environment, disrespect towards faculty, mismanagement and financial misconduct as the reason for the vote of no confidence. Included with this letter was a copy of a letter signed by Willis, dated July 30, 2025, in which the college stated it may have violated the law by removing pro union signage from faculty offices without their authorization or consent and threatened faculty with unlawful disciplinary actions.

== Campus ==
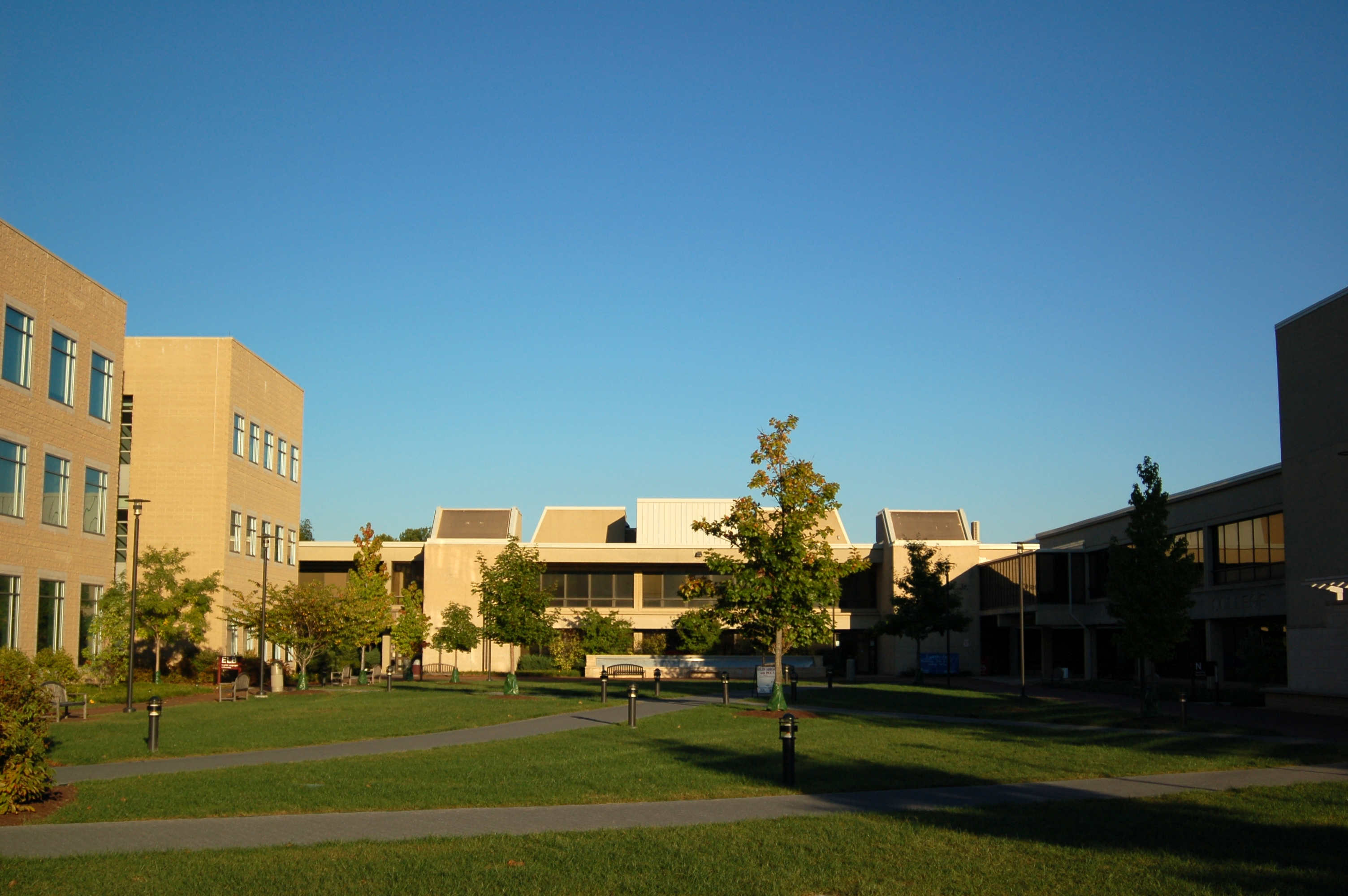
The Quad in 2007

The HCC main campus is located in Columbia, MD and is made up of 14 buildings, including a Welcome Center, located 35 minutes south of Baltimore and 50 minutes north of Washington, D.C. There are satellite campuses in Laurel at the Laurel College Center (LCC) and Training & Development Solutions Center.

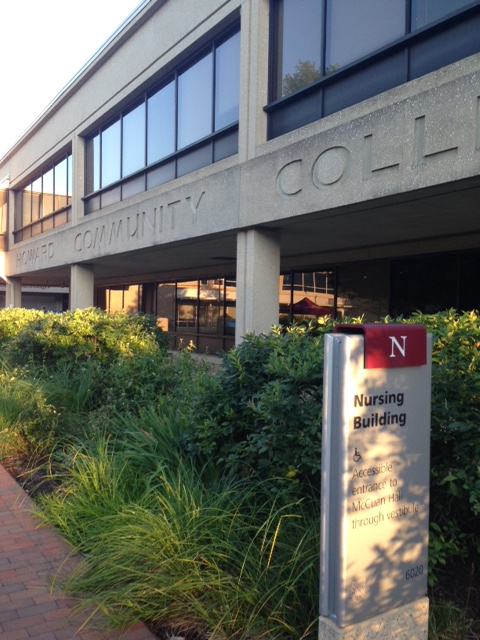
HCC's Nursing Building (now Howard Hall), one of the first structures on campus.

In 2003, a new instructional building was completed, the Mary Ellen Duncan Hall for English, Languages & Business, which includes a landscaped area now known as The Quad. The Student Services Building, completed in spring 2007, is the most recent building added to The Quad. It was later renamed The Rouse Company Foundation Student Services Hall. In 2013, the Health Sciences Building (now Kathleen Herrington Hall) opened, and the HCC Men's Track and Field team won the 2013 NJCAA Outdoor Track and Field.

The Peter and Elizabeth Horowitz Visual and Performing Arts Center opened in the fall of 2006. The center is home to three performance venues, two art galleries, two dance studios and multiple instructional facilities for HCC's Arts and Humanities Programs. Performance venues include the 250-seat Horowitz Center Studio Theatre, the 119-seat Monteabaro Recital Hall and the 424-seat Smith Theatre. The center caters to numerous community events, in addition to being the home of the Howard County Community Dance Festival, HCC Music Guest Artist in Residence Series, HCC Jazz Festival, and until 2023, Rep Stage.

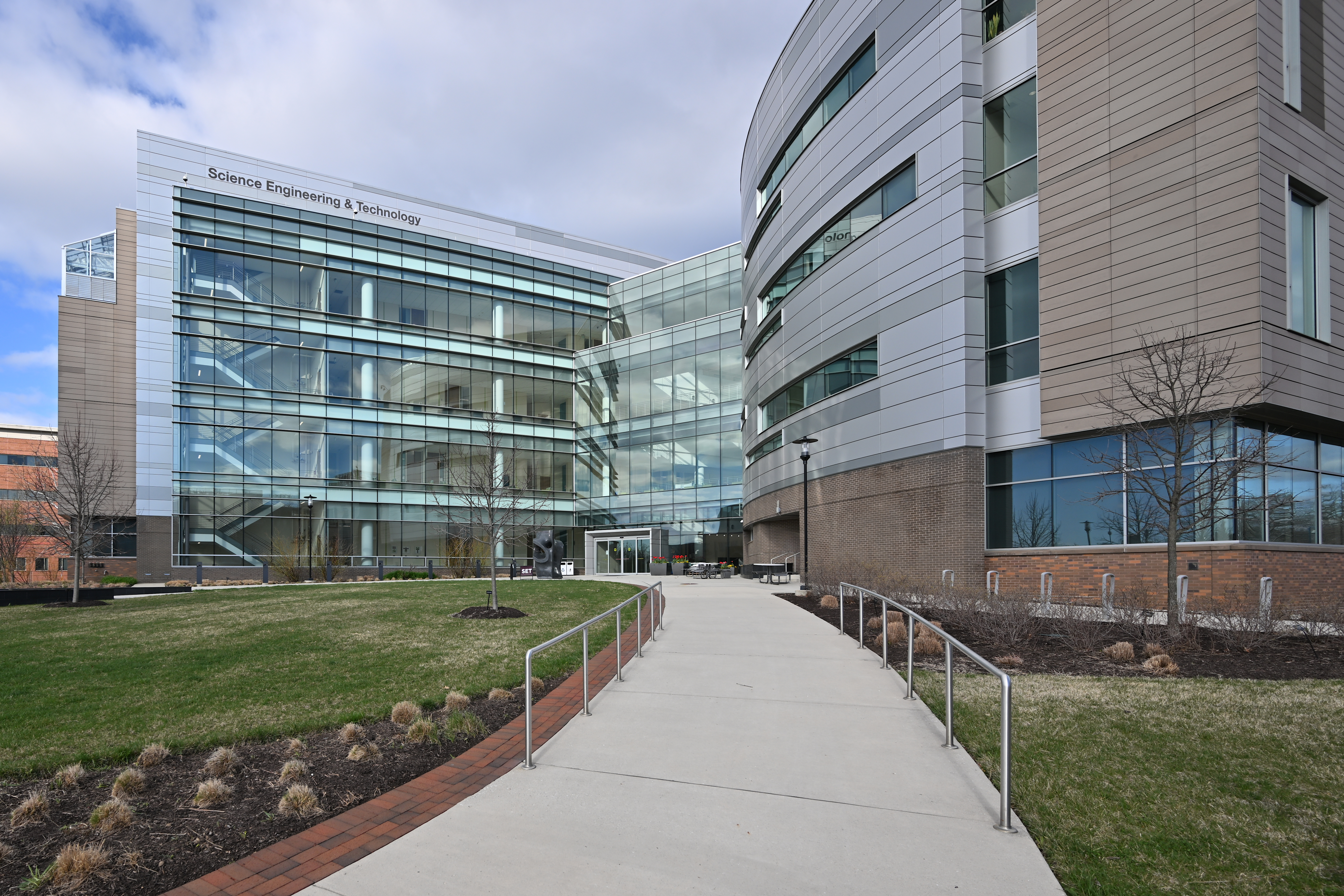
The Science Engineering and Technology building

In November 2014, a groundbreaking was held for a 145,300 sq ft four-story Science Engineering and Technology (SET) building. The facility replaces 260 parking spots to provide labs focused on Howard County Economic Development Agency initiatives including 3D printing and cybersecurity. The SET Building opened for classes in the summer of 2017, providing dedicated laboratories, a rooftop telescope observation area, and more than 1,000 total classroom seats. In 2023, the college announced an $11 million campaign to create a new campus-based workforce development and skilled trades center, the first in Howard County. In 2024, the Boys & Girls Clubs of America opened a new location in the college campus, aided by county executive Calvin Ball.

== Academics ==
There are eight academic divisions at Howard Community College. They include:

- Arts & Humanities
- Business & Computer Systems
- Continuing Education & Workforce Development
- English & World Languages
- Health Sciences
- Mathematics
- Science, Engineering & Technology
- Social Sciences & Teacher Education
