= McHenry, Maryland =

Unincorporated community in Maryland, United States

- Unincorporated community
- Location within Maryland Location within the United States
- Coordinates: 39°33′30″N 79°21′10″W
- Country: United States
- State: Maryland
- County: Garrett
- Elevation: 2,480 ft (760 m)
- Time zone: UTC-5 (Eastern (EST))
  - Summer (DST): UTC-4 (EDT)
- ZIP code: 21541
- GNIS feature ID: 585763

McHenry is an unincorporated community located in Garrett County, Maryland, United States, on the northernmost shore of Deep Creek Lake.

Located on the outskirts of McHenry are the Garrett County Airport, Wisp Ski Resort, and the Golf Club at Wisp.

McHenry is part of the media market of Pittsburgh.

McHenry's population as of 2012 was 1,328.
