= Maryland Route 935 =

State highway in Maryland, United States

Maryland Route 935

Route information
- Maintained by MDSHA
- Length: 2.99 mi (4.81 km)
- Existed: 1982–present

Major junctions
- South end: MD 36 in Barton
- North end: MD 36 in Nikep

Location
- Country: United States
- State: Maryland
- Counties: Allegany

Highway system
- Maryland highway system; Interstate; US; State; Scenic Byways
← MD 932	→ MD 936

Maryland Route 935 (MD 935) is an unsigned state highway in the U.S. state of Maryland. The state highway runs 2.99 miles (4.81 km) from MD 36 in Barton north to MD 36 in Nikep. MD 935 is the old alignment of MD 36 through Barton, Moscow, and Nikep in the Georges Creek Valley of western Allegany County. The state highway was designated when MD 36 moved to a new alignment through the communities in the early 1980s.

== Route description ==
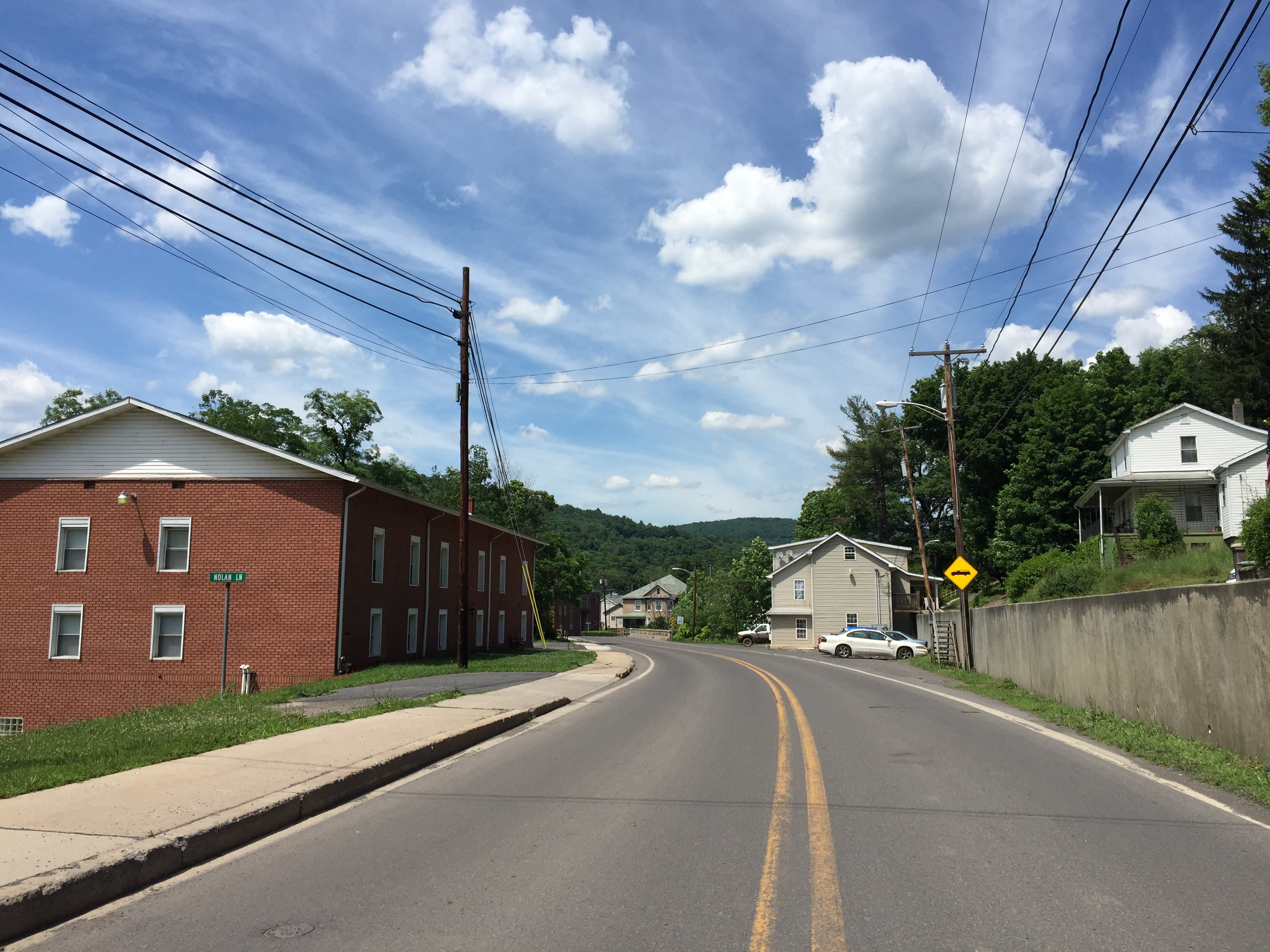
View north along MD 935 entering central Barton

MD 935 begins at an intersection with MD 36 (New Georges Creek Road) just south of Barton. The state highway heads west as a two-lane undivided road, then turns north at the following intersection with Lower Georges Creek Road, which heads south as a county-maintained portion of old MD 36. MD 936 heads north as Lower Georges Creek Road. The state highway's name changes to Legislative Road on crossing Moores Run and entering the town limits of Barton. MD 935 crosses Georges Creek and turns west. The state highway turns north again at Railroad Street and parallels the Georges Creek Railway through the business district of Barton. MD 935 turns northwest and crosses the railroad, then turns northeast to cross Butcher Run. Takoma Drive, an old alignment, splits to the east shortly before the state highway leaves the town of Barton. MD 935 continues north as Lower Georges Creek Road through the community of Moscow, where the state highway crosses Georges Creek a second time and closely parallels the railroad. A short unnamed highway, MD 935A, connects MD 935 and MD 36 within Moscow. MD 935 crosses Georges Creek a third time and passes through Nikep, where an old alignment parallels the highway, before reaching its northern terminus at MD 36 (Lower Georges Creek Road).

== History ==
MD 935 is the old alignment of MD 36 through Barton, Moscow, and Nikep. The highway was paved from Nikep toward Lonaconing by 1910. The road south of the center of Barton was paved by 1915. The highway from Barton north through Moscow to Nikep was under construction at that time and completed by 1919. MD 36's bypass of Barton, Moscow, and Nikep was completed around 1982, at which time MD 935 was assigned to the old road through the communities.

== Junction list ==
The entire route is in Allegany County.

Location	mi	km	Destinations	Notes
Barton	0.00	0.00	MD 36 (New Georges Creek Road) – Westernport	Southern terminus
Nikep	2.99	4.81	MD 36 (Lower Georges Creek Road) – Frostburg	Northern terminus
1.000 mi = 1.609 km; 1.000 km = 0.621 mi

== Auxiliary route ==
MD 935A is the unsigned designation for a 0.10-mile (0.16 km) connector road between MD 935 and MD 36 in Moscow.
