= Maryland Route 936 =

State highway in Maryland, United States

Maryland Route 936
- MD 936 highlighted in red

Route information
- Maintained by MDSHA
- Length: 5.04 mi (8.11 km)
- Existed: 1972–present

Major junctions
- South end: Church Street in Midland
- North end: US 40 Alt. / MD 36 in Frostburg

Location
- Country: United States
- State: Maryland
- Counties: Allegany

Highway system
- Maryland highway system; Interstate; US; State; Scenic Byways
← MD 935	→ MD 937

Maryland Route 936 (MD 936) is a state highway in the U.S. state of Maryland. Known for most of its length as Upper Georges Creek Road, the state highway runs 5.04 miles (8.11 km) from Church Street in Midland north to U.S. Route 40 Alternate (US 40 Alternate) and MD 36 in Frostburg. MD 936 is the old alignment of MD 36 between Midland and Frostburg in the upper Georges Creek Valley of western Allegany County. The state highway was designated when MD 36 moved to a new alignment between the two communities in the early 1970s.

== Route description ==
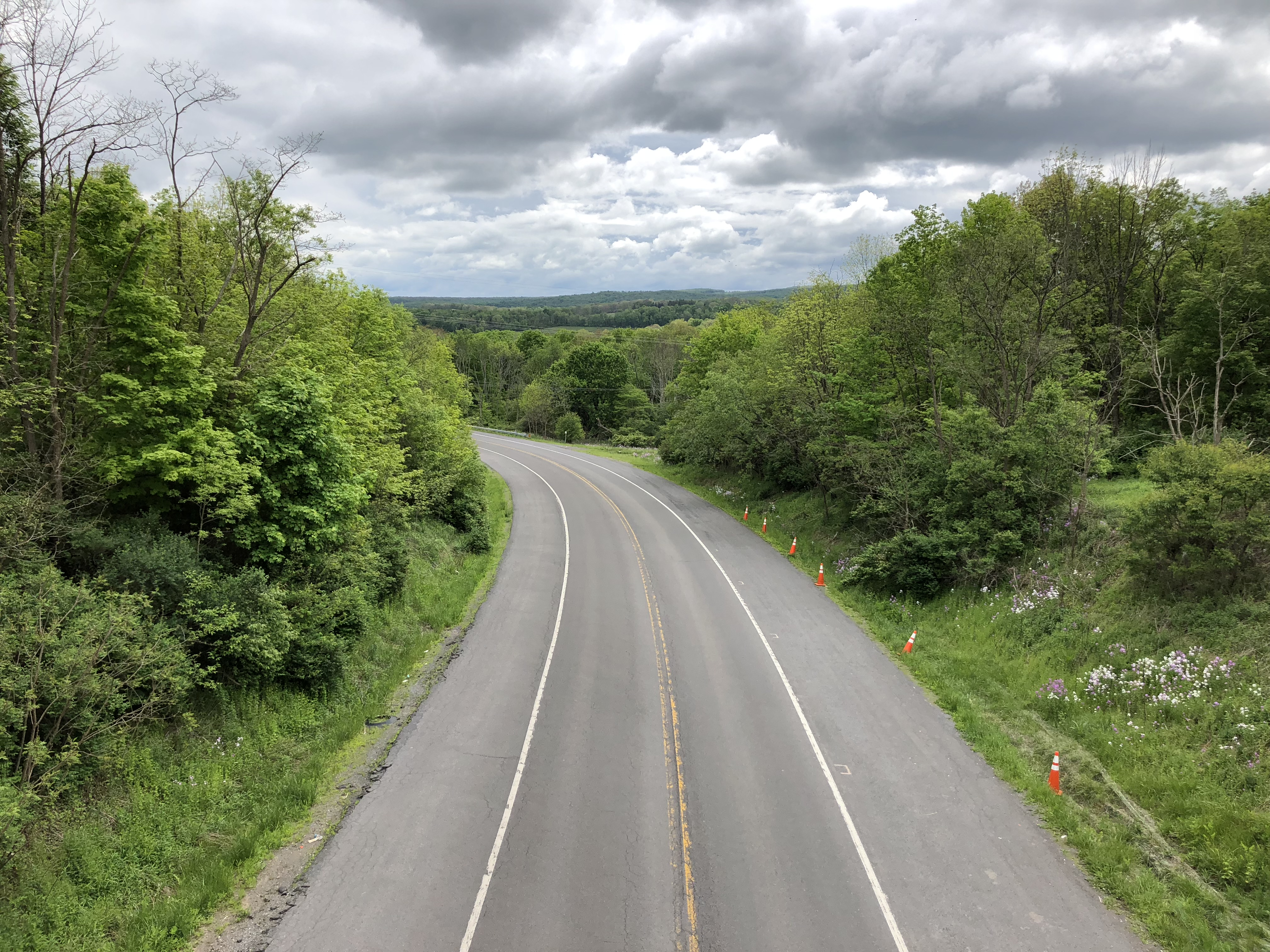
View south along MD 936 from I-68/US 40 in Borden Shaft

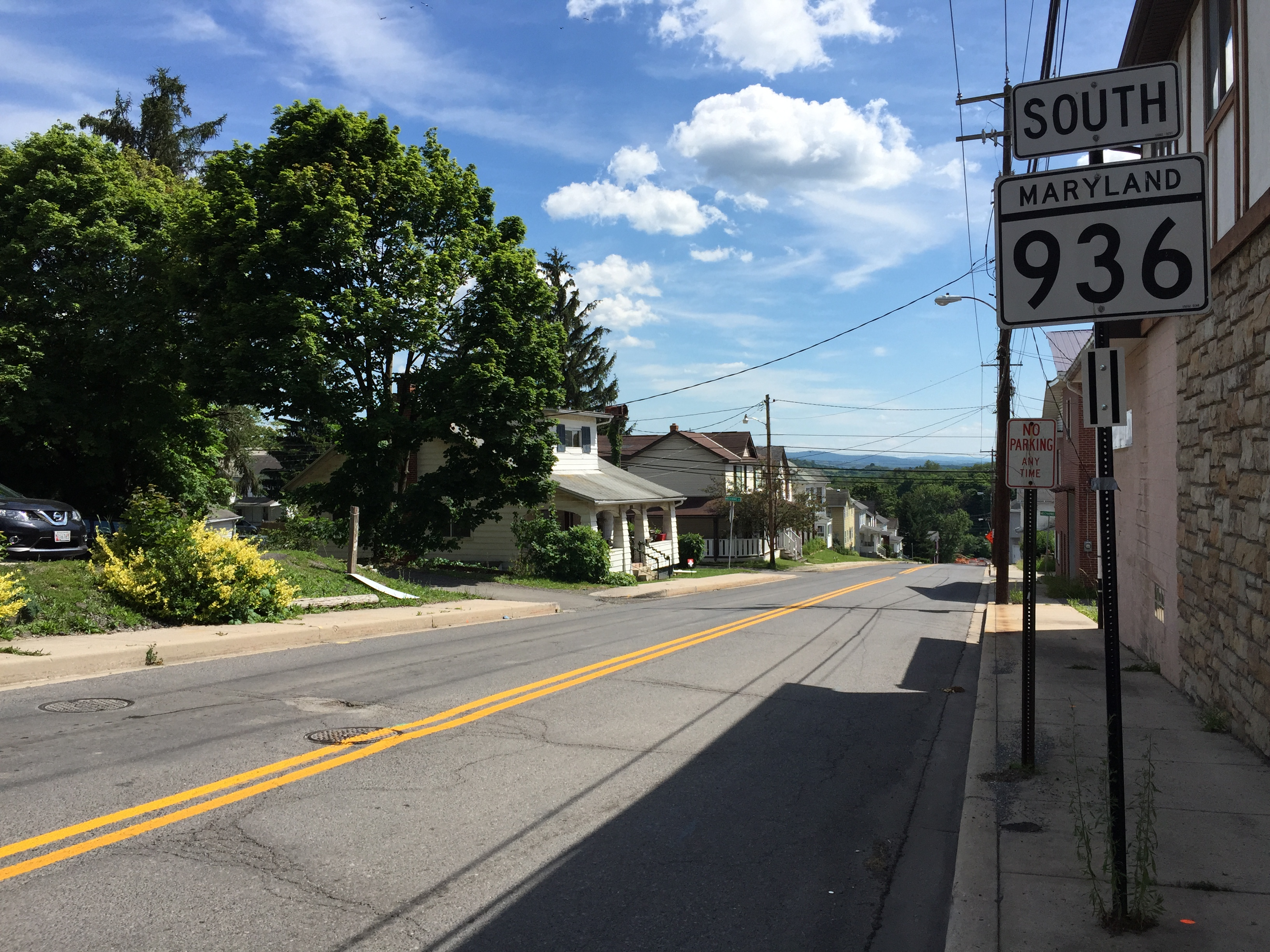
View south from the north end of MD 936 at US 40 Alt./MD 36 in Frostburg

MD 936 begins at the intersection of Broadway Street and Church Street in the town of Midland. The state highway is connected to MD 36 (Main Street) by Church Street. MD 936 heads north as two-lane undivided Upper Georges Creek Road paralleling Georges Creek and the Georges Creek Railway. The state highway passes through the small communities of Ocean, Klondike, Woodland, and Borden Shaft, where the railway reaches its northern terminus. MD 936 passes under Interstate 68 (I-68) without access, then enters a residential area. In the community of Grahamtown, the state highway passes through a very sharp S-curve. MD 936 veers to the northwest and enters the city of Frostburg at Green Street, where the highway becomes Grant Street. The state highway veers back north as it ascends a hill through a densely populated residential area to its northern terminus at US 40 Alternate and MD 36 (Main Street).

== History ==
MD 936 is the old alignment of MD 36 between Midland and Frostburg. The highway was paved from Frostburg to Borden Shaft by 1910. The highway from Borden Shaft to Midland was constructed as a state-aid road by 1915. MD 936 was assigned to its present course shortly after MD 36 moved to its new alignment east of MD 936 from Midland to Frostburg in 1972. MD 36 replaced the portion of MD 55 from Midland to Vale Summit. A new highway was constructed for MD 36 from Vale Summit to the eastern end of Frostburg, including the interchange with I-68. MD 936 originally included Broadway Street west from its current southern terminus in Midland. Responsibility for that 0.15-mile (0.24 km) portion of Broadway Street was returned to the town of Midland in 1999.

== Junction list ==
The entire route is in Allegany County.

Location	mi	km	Destinations	Notes
Midland	0.00	0.00	Broadway Street west / Church Street to MD 36	Southern terminus
Frostburg	5.04	8.11	US 40 Alt. / MD 36 (Main Street) – Cumberland, Mount Savage	Northern terminus
1.000 mi = 1.609 km; 1.000 km = 0.621 mi
