= Georges Creek Subdivision =

Railway line in Maryland

Overview
- Status: Inactive
- Owner: Eighteen Thirty Group, LLC (Leased by WMSR 2024)
- Locale: West Virginia, Western Maryland

Service
- Type: Freight rail
- Operator(s): CSX, WMSR

Technical
- Number of tracks: 1
- Track gauge: 4 ft 8 1/2 in (1,435 mm) standard gauge

The Georges Creek Subdivision also known as the Georges Creek Division (under the WMSR) is a railroad line with portions owned and operated by either CSX Transportation or the Georges Creek Railway (now owned by the WMSR) in the U.S. state of Maryland. The line runs from Westernport, Maryland, north to Carlos, Maryland, along the former Thomas Subdivision of the Western Maryland Railway (WM). CSX Huntington East Division Timetable

== History ==
The majority of the Georges Creek Subdivision was originally owned by the Cumberland and Pennsylvania Railroad (C&P). The WM purchased the C&P in 1944, and merged the two companies on September 1, 1953. Upon acquisition by the WM, the C&P was divided in half by the abandonment of the tunnel under Frostburg, Maryland and line through Gramtown (Lower Frostburg) with a total abandonment of 2.6 miles. The portion along Georges Creek continued to be a source of revenue for the WM, until it was acquired by Chessie System in 1973.

After the 1987 mergers of Chessie and Seaboard System into CSX, the line began to decline in use, but continues to this day to have occasional trains to the Morrison, Maryland open load-out tipple. On June 21, 2006 Western Maryland Survivors, LLC (WMS) purchased the northern/abandoned 8.54 mile portion of the Georges Creek Subdivision. This portion had two significant washouts that caused CSX to discontinue service north of the Morrison load-out and begin abandonment proceedings. Due to investor difficulties involving WMS, the property was sold during Federal Bankruptcy Court proceedings on February 24, 2011 to one of the WMS original partners, and another partner under the auspices of the Eighteen Thirty Group, LLC. This partner was also a partner with the Georges Creek Railway, which had intended to operate the line upon the restoration of the washouts. This portion of the line was being restored in 2012.

== Post-CSX activity ==
On May 15, 2015, the Eighteen Thirty Group filed a notice of intent to acquire 5.4 miles of rail line from CSX: 4.8 miles of the Georges Creek Subdivision between Barton, Maryland and Westernport, and 0.6 miles of the CSX Thomas Subdivision. The Georges Creek Railway entered an agreement with Eighteen Thirty Group to operate trains on these lines. Following the closure of a paper mill in Luke, Maryland—a major customer of the Georges Creek Railway—the Railway ceased operations in 2019.

In January 2024, the Western Maryland Scenic Railroad (WMSR) of Cumberland, Maryland signed a long-term lease of the Georges Creek Railway from the Eighteen Thirty Group, and the railroad made plans to eventually operate passenger excursion and freight trains the right-of-way as their Georges Creek Division. CSX had occasionally expressed interest in interchanging revenue freight trains with the WMSR, and the WMSR decided to eventually use the Georges Creek Division to fulfill CSX’s desires for a profitable freight partnership.
