= Maryland Route 937 =

State highway in Maryland, United States

Maryland Route 937

Route information
- Maintained by MDSHA and Town of Westernport
- Length: 1.53 mi (2.46 km)
- Existed: 1982–present

Major junctions
- South end: MD 135 in Westernport
- North end: MD 36 in Westernport

Location
- Country: United States
- State: Maryland
- Counties: Allegany

Highway system
- Maryland highway system; Interstate; US; State; Scenic Byways
| ← MD 936 | → MD 939 |

Maryland Route 937 (MD 937) is an unsigned state highway in the U.S. state of Maryland. The state highway runs 1.53 miles (2.46 km) from MD 135 north to MD 36 within Westernport. MD 937 is the old alignment of MD 36 through Westernport in the Georges Creek Valley of western Allegany County. The state highway was designated when MD 36 moved to a new alignment through the community in the early 1980s.

== Route description ==
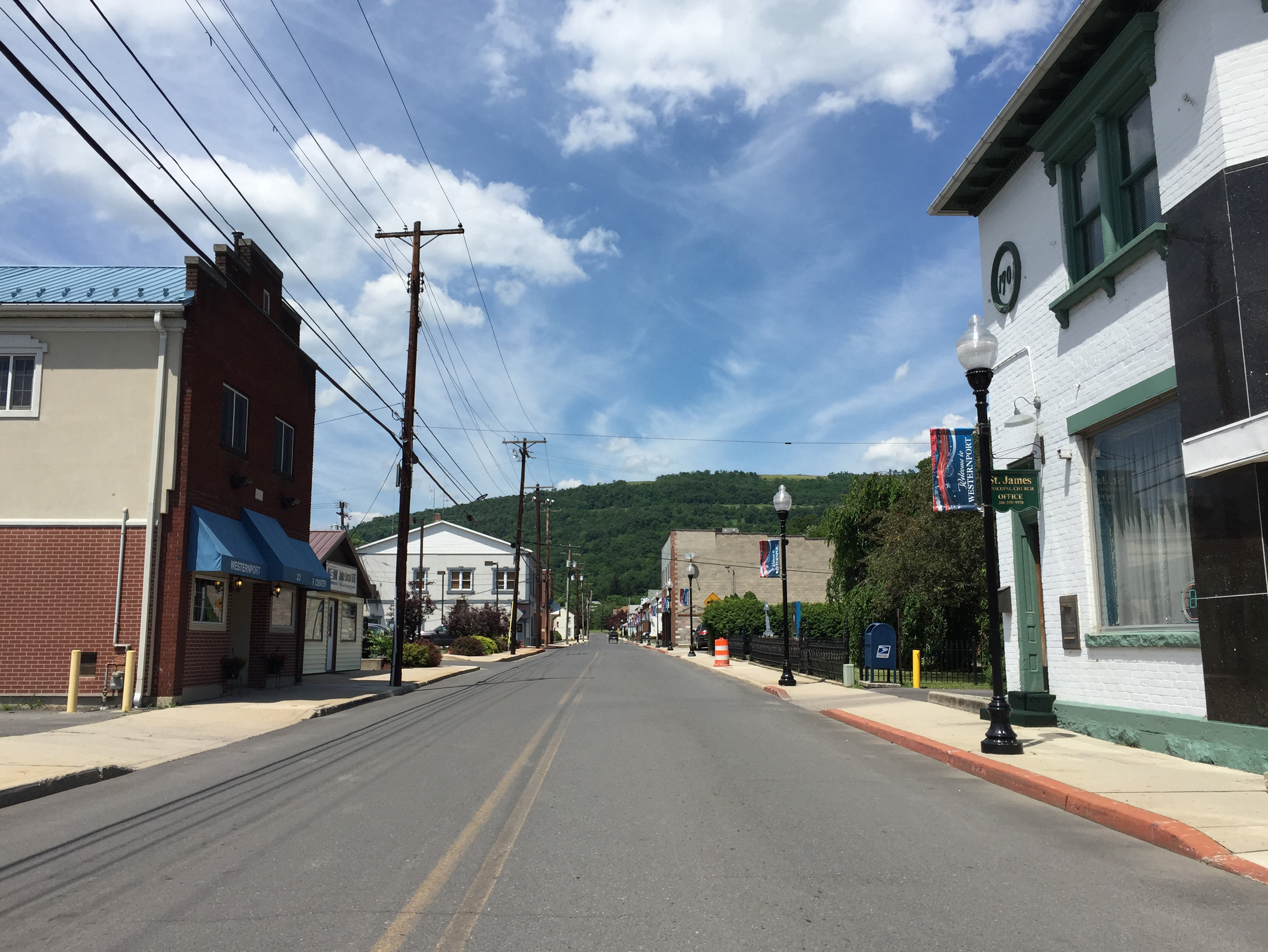
View north along MD 937 at MD 135 in Westernport

MD 937 begins at an intersection with MD 135 (Church Street) adjacent to the junction of the Georges Creek Railway with CSX's Thomas Subdivision railroad line on the south side of Westernport. The state highway heads north as Main Street, a two-lane undivided street maintained by the town of Westernport. North of downtown Westernport, MD 937 passes through several sharp curves as it parallels the Georges Creek Railway. The state highway becomes maintained by the Maryland State Highway Administration and its name changes to Creekside Drive on leaving the town of Westernport. The state highway passes a row of residences before reaching its northern terminus at MD 36 (New Georges Creek Road).

== History ==
MD 937 is the old alignment of MD 36 through Westernport. The highway was paved through Westernport by 1910. MD 36's present alignment on the west side of Georges Creek was under construction by 1975. MD 36 was transferred to the new alignment and MD 937 was assigned to the old road by 1982.

== Junction list ==
The entire route is in Westernport, Allegany County.

| mi | km | Destinations | Notes |
|---|---|---|---|
| 0.00 | 0.00 | MD 135 (Church Street) – Luke, McCoole | Southern terminus |
| 1.53 | 2.46 | MD 36 (New Georges Creek Road) – Barton, Frostburg | Northern terminus |
1.000 mi = 1.609 km; 1.000 km = 0.621 mi
