= Georges Creek Railroad =

Defunct American rail line

Map

The Georges Creek Railroad was a railroad operated by the Georges Creek Coal and Iron Company in Western Maryland. The railroad operated from 1853 to 1863, when it was acquired by the Cumberland and Pennsylvania Railroad (C&P).

== History ==
Georges Creek Coal and Iron Company (GCC&I) had constructed and was operating a blast furnace in Lonaconing, Maryland. With production going well, iron piled up. Delivery was a problem. After experimenting with a horse-powered tram road, the company realized that a rail line, built down the Georges Creek Valley toward the Potomac River at Westernport, would be the answer to the transportation issue.

The company began to concentrate on a railroad to meet with the Chesapeake and Ohio Canal and the railroad at Westernport. By 1850, surveys were complete. The Baltimore and Ohio Railroad (B&O) reached Piedmont, West Virginia, across the river from Westernport, in July 1851. In September of that year, the GCC&I railroad construction began up the Georges Creek. The 9.2 miles (14.8 km) rail line was opened on May 9, 1853, and ran from Lonaconing to Piedmont, where it connected with the B&O line. In June 1853, a total of 1,061 tons of coal were shipped. In all of 1855, 225,000 tons of coal were shipped, sometimes in 102-car trains. Iron, ore or cast, did not figure into the shipments. In 1856, the rail line was extended from Lonaconing northward to connect with the Cumberland and Pennsylvania Railroad (C&P) from Frostburg, Maryland.

It was, unfortunately, too late to provide the needed market access for the Lonaconing Iron Furnace. The furnace in Lonaconing was abandoned in 1855. Coal, not iron, became the most important commodity shipped out of the region on the railroad.

The Georges Creek Railroad was acquired by the C&P on October 23, 1863. The shops and engine house at Lonaconing were used until 1867. These were located just north of where the road to Dan's Mountain State Park merges with Maryland Route 36, at Water Station Road, north of Lonaconing. This section of line still saw use in 1998 for on-demand coal service. In 1991, the Georges Creek subdivision of CSX hauled 195,197 tons of coal over this line, as compared with the 225,000 tons by the Georges Creek Rail Road in 1855.

Baldwin Locomotive Works and Smith & Perkins sold engines and rolling stock to the Georges Creek Company. Ross Winans of Baltimore sold wheels and axles to the GCC&I for mine cars. Passenger service was provided on the Georges Creek Railroad with their 2-6-0 engine. A list of motive power for the Georges Creek Rail Road has been compiled, but it is not known if this is a complete list. All of the listed engines were transferred to Cumberland & Pennsylvania Railroad ownership, as part of the buyout. No pictures of the 2-6-0 or 0-6-0 engines are known to exist. Locomotives were generally named after geographical references, or persons of significance. The significance of Mr. A. H. Stump has not yet been determined.

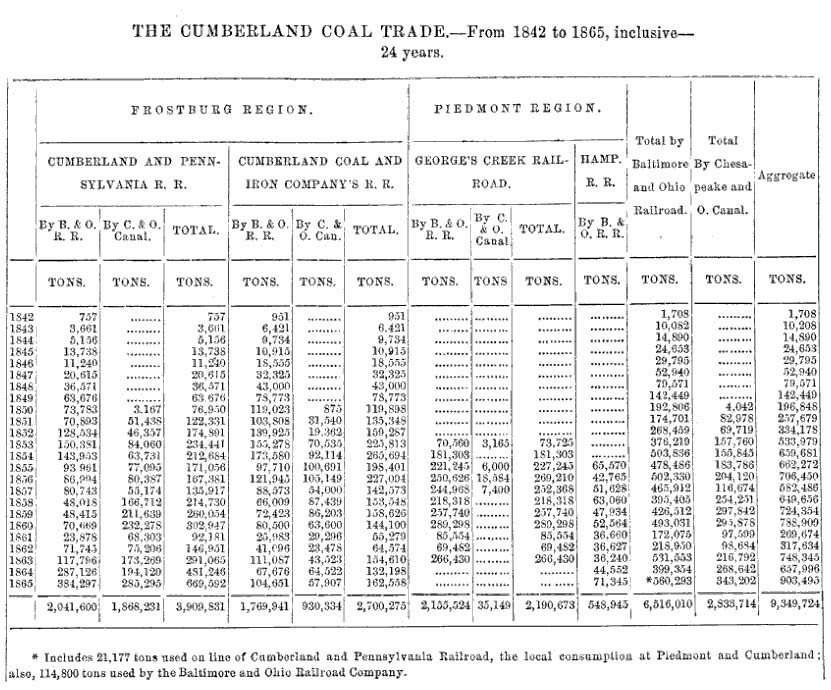

== See also ==
- List of defunct Maryland railroads
- George's Creek and Cumberland Railroad (1876-1917)
- Georges Creek Railway (2007–present)
