= Franklin, Maryland =

- Census-designated place
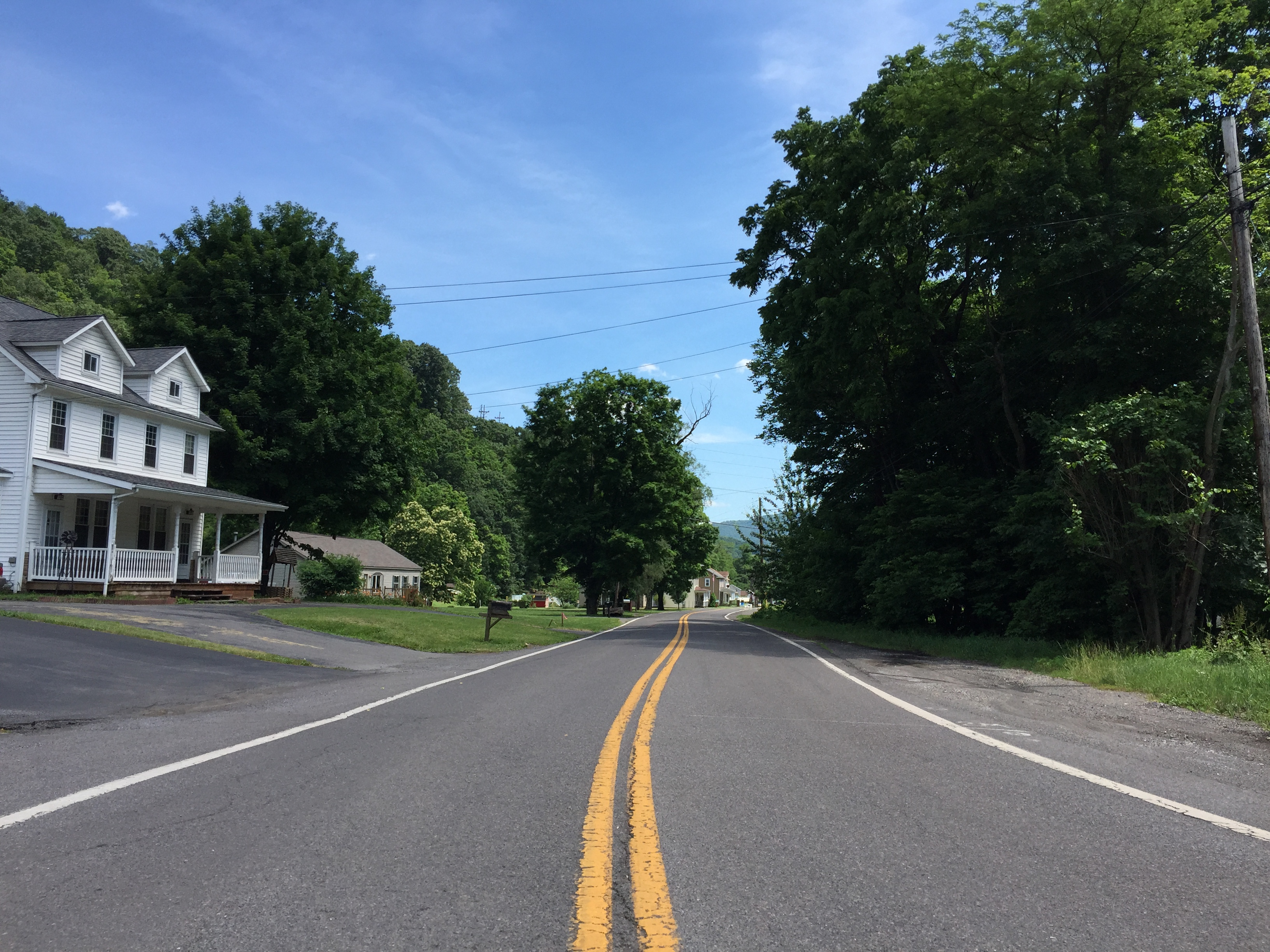

- Location within Maryland
- Coordinates: 39°30′01″N 79°03′03″W
- Country: United States
- State: Maryland
- County: Allegany

Area
  - Total: 0.27 sq mi (0.71 km^{2})
  - Land: 0.27 sq mi (0.71 km^{2})
  - Water: 0 sq mi (0.00 km^{2})
- Elevation: 1,106 ft (337 m)

Population (2020)
  - Total: 253
  - Density: 917.0/sq mi (354.04/km^{2})
- Time zone: UTC-5 (Eastern (EST))
  - Summer (DST): UTC-4 (EDT)
- ZIP code: 21562
- Area codes: 301, 240
- GNIS feature ID: 2583624

Franklin is an unincorporated community and census-designated place (CDP) in Allegany County, Maryland, United States. As of the 2010 census it had a population of 290.

Franklin is located along Maryland routes 36 and 937, 1 mile (1.6 km) north of Westernport.

== Demographics ==
Historical population
Census	Pop.	Note	%±
2020	253		—
U.S. Decennial Census
