= Gilmore, Maryland =

- Census-designated place
- Location within the State of Maryland Gilmore (the United States)
- Coordinates: 39°34′58″N 78°57′0″W
- Country: United States
- State: Maryland
- County: Allegany

Area
  - Total: 0.10 sq mi (0.27 km^{2})
  - Land: 0.10 sq mi (0.27 km^{2})
  - Water: 0 sq mi (0.00 km^{2})
- Elevation: 1,667 ft (508 m)

Population (2020)
  - Total: 132
  - Density: 1,268.5/sq mi (489.77/km^{2})
- Time zone: UTC−5 (Eastern (EST))
  - Summer (DST): UTC−4 (EDT)
- FIPS code: 24-32175
- GNIS feature ID: 2583630

Gilmore is an unincorporated community and census-designated place (CDP) in Allegany County, Maryland, United States. As of the 2010 census it had a population of 127. It is part of the Cumberland, MD-WV Metropolitan Statistical Area.

Gilmore lies in the valley of Georges Creek, a tributary of the North Branch Potomac River, between Dans Mountain to the southeast and Big Savage Mountain to the northwest. Maryland Route 36 runs north–south through the community. Midland is directly to the north, and Lonaconing is 2 miles (3 km) to the southwest.

== Demographics ==
Historical population
Census	Pop.	Note	%±
2020	132		—
U.S. Decennial Census
