= Laurel Run (Georges Creek tributary) =

Tributary in Allegany County, Maryland

Coordinates: 39.544813°N 79.006972°W

Laurel Run is a 4.5-mile-long (7.2 km) tributary stream of Georges Creek in Allegany County, Maryland. The creek rises about 3 miles (4.8 km) northwest of Lonaconing and empties into Georges Creek north of Barton.

Laurel Run Road crosses Laurel Run on a steel girder bridge with open grating, constructed in 1955 and rebuilt in 2002.
