= Maryland Route 55 =

State highway in Allegany County, Maryland, US, known as Vale Summit Rd

Maryland Route 55
- Vale Summit Road

Route information
- Maintained by MDSHA
- Length: 2.53 mi (4.07 km)
- Existed: 1927–present

Major junctions
- South end: MD 36 in Vale Summit
- North end: US 40 Alt. in Clarysville

Location
- Country: United States
- State: Maryland
- Counties: Allegany

Highway system
- Maryland highway system; Interstate; US; State; Scenic Byways
← MD 54	→ MD 56

Maryland Route 55 (MD 55) is a state highway in the U.S. state of Maryland. Known as Vale Summit Road, the state highway runs 2.53 miles (4.07 km) from MD 36 in Vale Summit north to U.S. Route 40 Alternate (US 40 Alt.) in Clarysville. MD 55 connects the La Vale area with Midland in the upper Georges Creek Valley in northwestern Allegany County. MD 55 was paved from Clarysville to Vale Summit around 1921 and extended south to Midland in the late 1930s. The southern terminus of the state highway was truncated at Vale Summit when MD 36 took over part of the highway for a new alignment in the early 1970s.

== Route description ==
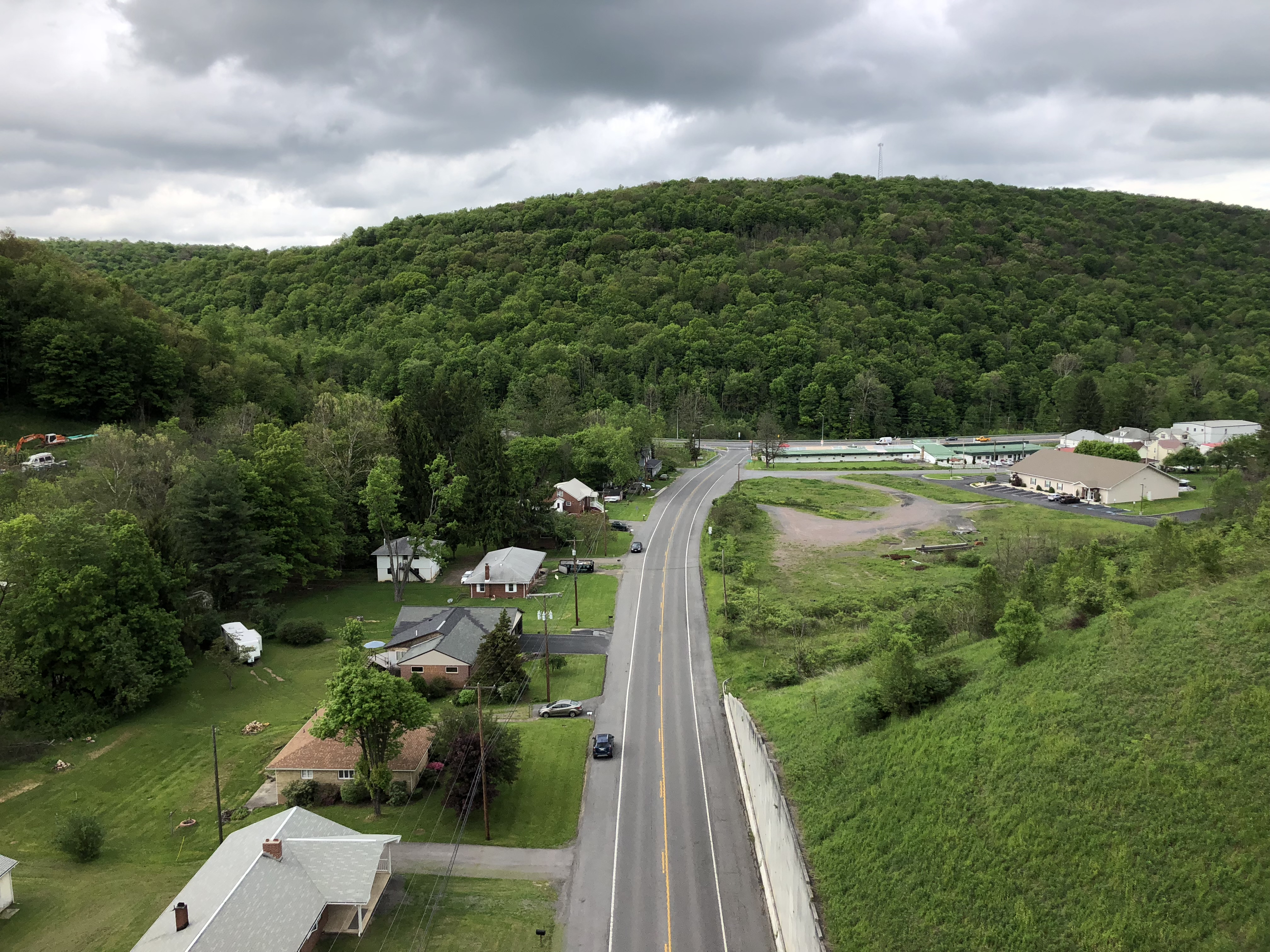
View north along MD 55 entering Clarysville

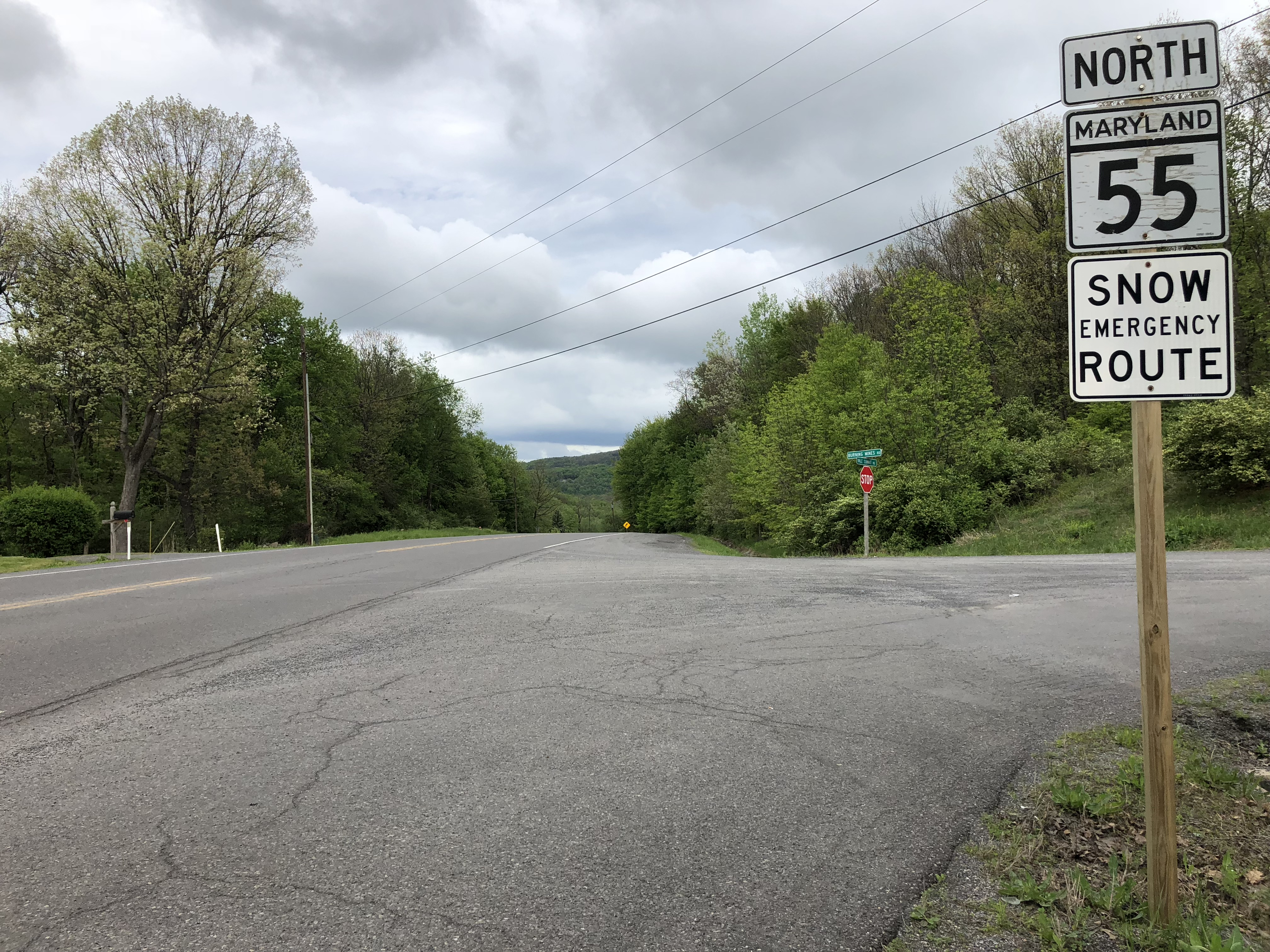
View north from the south end of MD 55 at MD 36 in Vale Summit

MD 55 begins at an intersection with MD 36 (New Georges Creek Road) in Vale Summit. The two-lane undivided highway descends from Vale Summit into the valley of Braddock Run on its way to Clarysville. The state highway starts by heading east through a residential area of Vale Summit. As MD 55 passes the Vale Summit United Methodist Church, which dates back to 1889, the state highway curves to the north and passes by the residential settlements of Loartown and Montel. The state highway descends into Spruce Hollow and passes under Interstate 68/US 40 (National Freeway) with no access before arriving in Clarysville. MD 55 intersects Clarysville Road, the original alignment of US 40, and passes the site of the Clarysville Inn, a historic inn built in 1807 that was destroyed by a fire in 1999, before reaching its northern terminus at US 40 Alt. (National Pike) in Clarysville.

== History ==
MD 55 was paved from Clarysville to Vale Summit by 1921. The Vale Summit–Midland segment of the highway was constructed around 1938. When US 40 was relocated in Clarysville around 1950, MD 55 was extended north a short distance to meet the new alignment. MD 55 itself was rebuilt and widened from Clarysville to Vale Summit in 1952 and from there to Midland in 1954. As part of MD 36's relocation between Midland and Frostburg, MD 36 took over the section of MD 55 between Midland and Vale Summit in 1972, leaving MD 55 at its present length.

== Junction list ==
The entire route is in Allegany County.

Location	mi	km	Destinations	Notes
Vale Summit	0.00	0.00	MD 36 (New Georges Creek Road) – Midland, Frostburg	Southern terminus
Clarysville	2.53	4.07	US 40 Alt. (National Pike) – Cumberland, Frostburg	Northern terminus
1.000 mi = 1.609 km; 1.000 km = 0.621 mi
