= Nikep, Maryland =

- Census-designated place
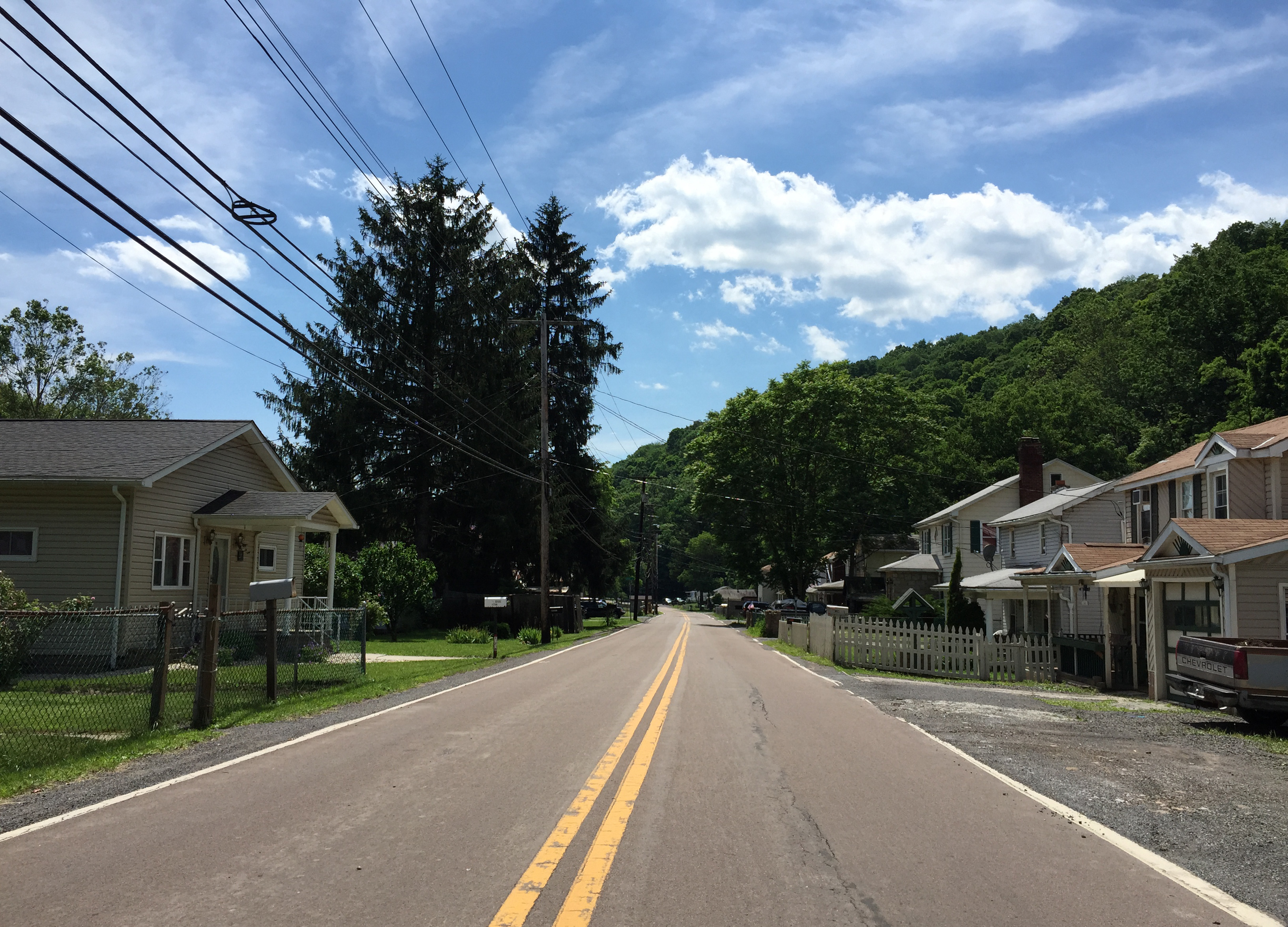

- Location within the State of Maryland Nikep (the United States)
- Coordinates: 39°33′04″N 78°59′56″W
- Country: United States
- State: Maryland
- County: Allegany

Area
  - Total: 0.15 sq mi (0.39 km^{2})
  - Land: 0.15 sq mi (0.39 km^{2})
  - Water: 0 sq mi (0.00 km^{2})
- Elevation: 1,486 ft (453 m)

Population (2020)
  - Total: 95
  - Density: 631.3/sq mi (243.76/km^{2})
- Time zone: UTC−5 (Eastern (EST))
  - Summer (DST): UTC−4 (EDT)
- FIPS code: 24-55950
- GNIS feature ID: 2583666

Nikep (originally known as Pekin) is an unincorporated community and census-designated place (CDP) in Allegany County, Maryland, United States. As of the 2020 census it had a population of 95. Nikep is located in the Georges Creek Valley of western Allegany County, along the old route of Maryland Route 36. Lonaconing is 1.6 miles (2.6 km) to the northeast, and Westernport is 6.6 miles (10.6 km) to the southwest.

The name Nikep was given to the first post office established in the community, because Pekin was already in use at another post office (Pekin, Indiana).

== Demographics ==
Historical population
Census	Pop.	Note	%±
2010	116		—
2020	95		−18.1%
U.S. Decennial Census
