= William Shaw (minister) =

William Shaw (1757 - 1815) was a Methodist minister born in Barton-upon-Humber, Lincolnshire, England, who founded the town of Barton, Maryland in the United States in 1794.

The Shaw Mansion, on Laurel Run Road in Barton, is on the National Register of Historic Properties. It was built in 1872 by the son of Willam Shaw, Andrew Shaw.
