= Zihlman, Maryland =

- Census-designated place
- Location within the State of Maryland Zihlman, Maryland (the United States)
- Coordinates: 39°40′26″N 78°54′47″W
- Country: United States
- State: Maryland
- County: Allegany

Area
  - Total: 1.51 sq mi (3.90 km^{2})
  - Land: 1.51 sq mi (3.90 km^{2})
  - Water: 0 sq mi (0.00 km^{2})
- Elevation: 1,706 ft (520 m)

Population (2020)
  - Total: 331
  - Density: 220/sq mi (84.8/km^{2})
- Time zone: UTC−5 (Eastern (EST))
  - Summer (DST): UTC−4 (EDT)
- FIPS code: 24-87275
- GNIS feature ID: 2583708

Zihlman (formerly Allegany) is an unincorporated community and census-designated place (CDP) in Allegany County, Maryland, United States. As of the 2010 census it had a population of 362.

Zihlman is located along Maryland Route 36, 1.5 miles (2.4 km) northeast of and 500 feet (150 m) lower in elevation than Frostburg. Mount Savage is 3 miles (5 km) further northeast along MD 36.

== Demographics ==
Historical population
Census	Pop.	Note	%±
2020	331		—
U.S. Decennial Census
