= Maryland Route 36 =

State highway in Allegany County, Maryland, US

Maryland Route 36
- MD 36 highlighted in red

Route information
- Maintained by MDSHA
- Length: 29.43 mi (47.36 km)
- Existed: 1927–present
- Tourist routes: Historic National Road; Mountain Maryland Scenic Byway

Major junctions
- South end: WV 46 at Westernport
- MD 135 at Westernport; I-68 / US 40 near Frostburg; US 40 Alt. at Frostburg
- North end: US 40 Alt. at Cumberland

Location
- Country: United States
- State: Maryland
- Counties: Allegany

Highway system
- Maryland highway system; Interstate; US; State; Scenic Byways
← MD 35	→ MD 38

Maryland Route 36 (also known as MD 36 or Route 36) is a 29.43-mile (47.36 km) state highway located in Allegany County, Maryland, United States. MD 36's southern terminus is at the West Virginia Route 46 (WV 46) bridge in Westernport and its northern terminus is at U.S. Route 40 Alternate (US 40 Alt.) near Cumberland. Between Westernport and Frostburg, it is known as Georges Creek Road, and from Frostburg to Cumberland it is known as Mount Savage Road. Like the majority of Maryland state highways, MD 36 is maintained by the Maryland State Highway Administration (MDSHA).

MD 36 serves as the main road through the Georges Creek Valley, a region which is historically known for coal mining, and has been designated by MDSHA as part of the Coal Heritage Scenic Byway. MD 36 is the main road connecting the towns of Westernport, Lonaconing, and Midland in southwestern Allegany County, as well as Frostburg, Mount Savage, and Corriganville in northwestern Allegany County.

== Route description ==
MD 36 has two main sections: Georges Creek Road, which runs along the Georges Creek Valley, from Westernport to Frostburg in southwestern Allegany County, and Mount Savage Road, which runs eastward from Frostburg to Cumberland in northwestern Allegany County. MD 36 is a part of the National Highway System as a principal arterial from Interstate 68 (I-68) to US 40 Alt. in Frostburg and from MD 35 at Corriganville to US 40 Alt. in Cumberland.

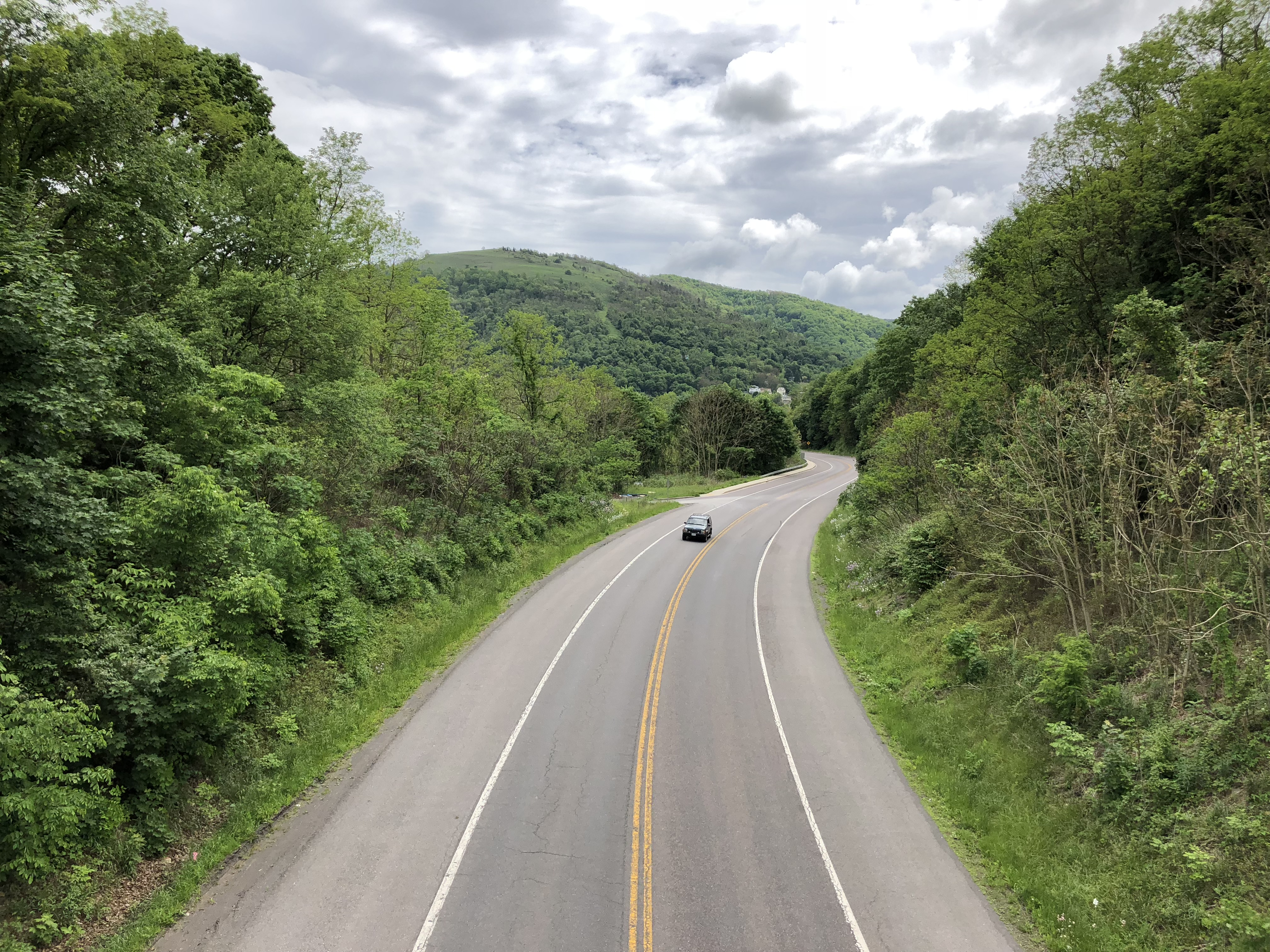
MD 36 southbound entering Westernport

=== Georges Creek Road ===
MD 36 begins at the WV 46 bridge in Westernport, crossing MD 135 in Westernport, and runs northeast across western Allegany County as a two-lane undivided road named Georges Creek Road, named for Georges Creek, a North Branch Potomac River tributary which the road parallels. The roadway also parallels the Georges Creek Railway. A short distance outside Westernport city limits, MD 36 intersects MD 937, an old alignment of MD 36. Near Barton, MD 36 intersects MD 935, which is the old alignment of MD 36 through Barton. MD 36 bypasses Barton, climbing the hillside above the Georges Creek Valley before descending back into the valley as it approaches Lonaconing. MD 935 returns to MD 36 south of Lonaconing, with its northern terminus at MD 36.

As the road enters Lonaconing, it narrows and passes through the town as Main Street, intersecting Douglas Avenue near the center of Lonaconing. Along Main Street in Lonaconing is the Lonaconing Iron Furnace, a historic blast furnace which operated in the early 19th century.

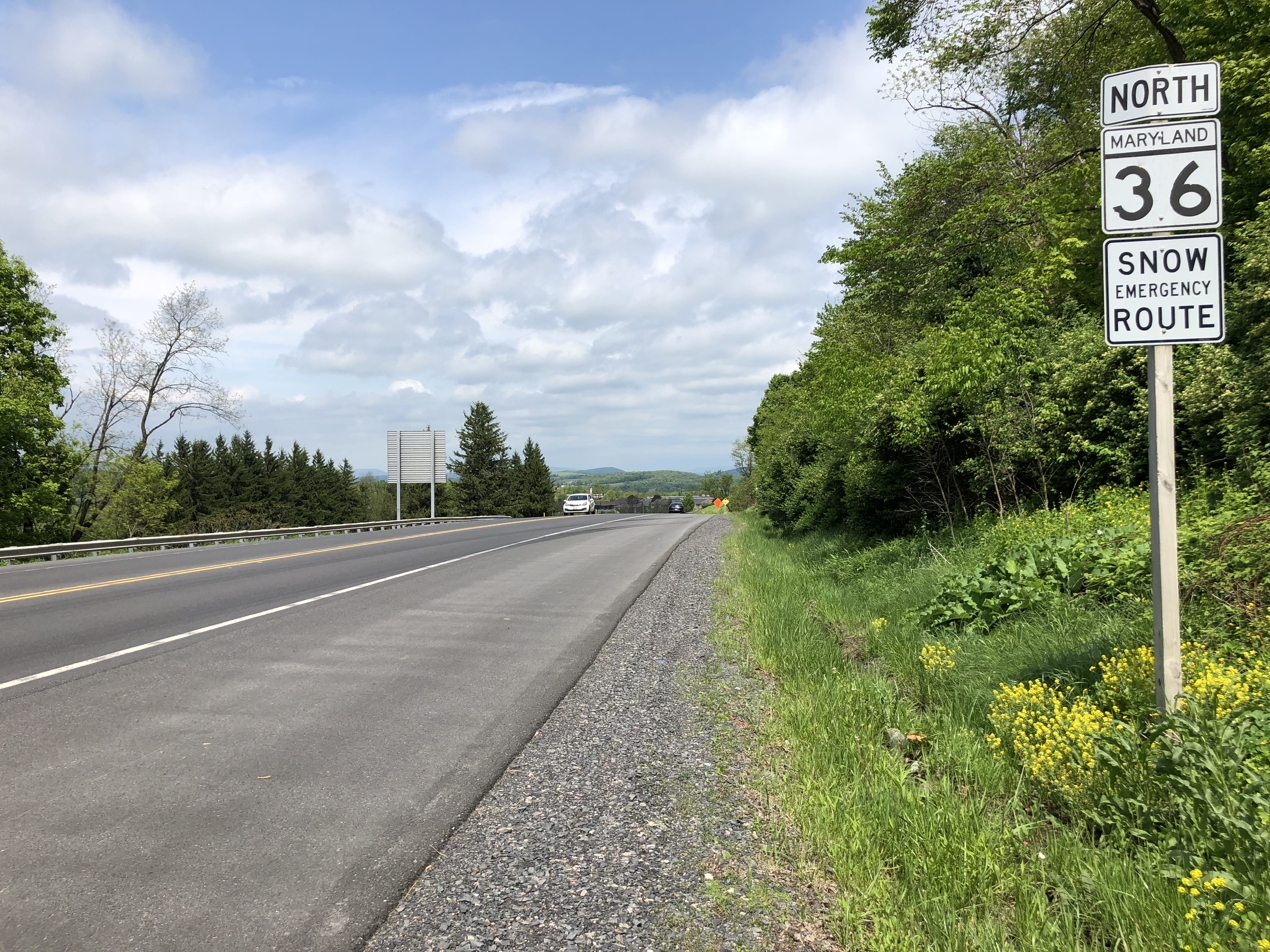
MD 36 northbound past I-68/US 40 south of Frostburg

MD 36 then continues toward Midland. At Midland, there is a sharp curve in the road. Along this curve, MD 36 intersects Church Street, which connects to MD 936, the old alignment of MD 36 between Midland and Frostburg. The new alignment of MD 36 proceeds northeast, passing near Vale Summit, where it intersects MD 55.

North of the MD 55 intersection, MD 36 passes west of a park and ride lot before it meets I-68/US 40 at a diamond interchange at exit 34. Near this interchange is God's Ark of Safety, a church famous for its attempt to build a replica of Noah's Ark. Between Midland and Frostburg, there is a short section near the I-68/US 40 interchange where MD 36 expands to four lanes. Upon entering Frostburg, MD 36 joins US 40 Alt. as Main Street. MD 36 follows Main Street westward through Frostburg, meeting the northern terminus of MD 936 at Grant Street. At Depot Street, near the center of Frostburg, MD 36 connects to the western depot of the Western Maryland Scenic Railroad. At the intersection with Water Street, MD 36 leaves US 40 Alt., and upon leaving Frostburg city limits its name changes to Mount Savage Road.

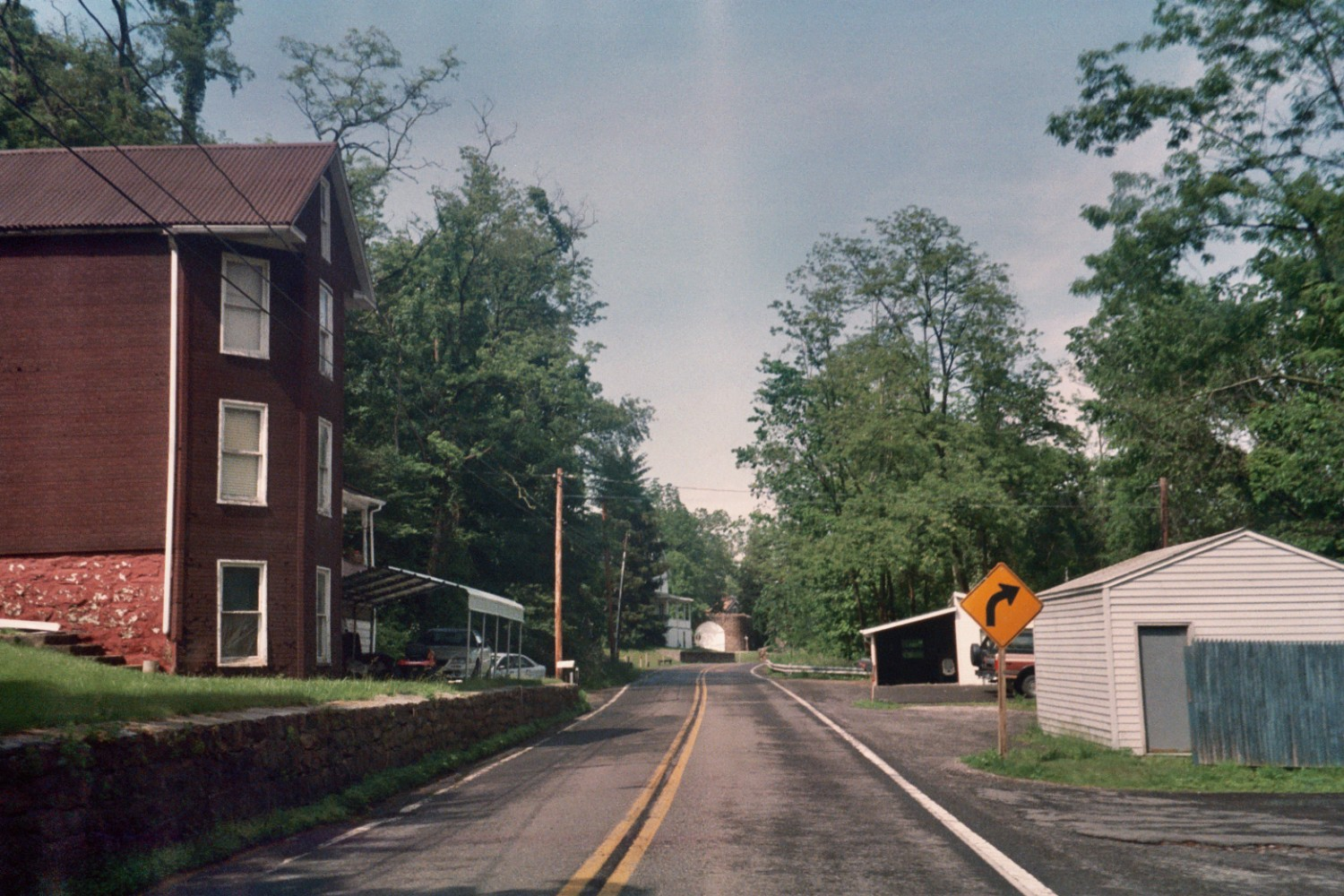
MD 36 approaching Mount Savage, with part of the Mount Savage Castle visible in the background

=== Mount Savage Road ===
After leaving Frostburg, MD 36 is known as Mount Savage Road, as it travels eastward, perpendicular to its signed direction, toward Mount Savage. North of Eckhart Mines, MD 36 meets MD 638, which connects MD 36 to US 40 Alt. in Eckhart Mines. The road between Frostburg and Mount Savage is particularly curvy, and includes several hairpin turns near Frostburg.

As the road enters Mount Savage, it passes by the Mount Savage Castle, a Scottish-style castle built in 1840, which currently operates as a bed-and-breakfast. In Mount Savage, the route narrows as it follows Main Street. East of Mount Savage, the route widens.

In Barrelville, MD 36 intersects MD 47, which connects it with Pennsylvania Route 160 (PA 160) in Somerset County. From its intersection with MD 47 to its terminus at Cumberland, MD 36 follows newer alignments, with the old alignments being designated MD 831. At Corriganville, MD 36 intersects MD 35, which connects it with PA 96 in Bedford County. MD 36 ends at US 40 Alt. at the Narrows near Cumberland.

== History ==
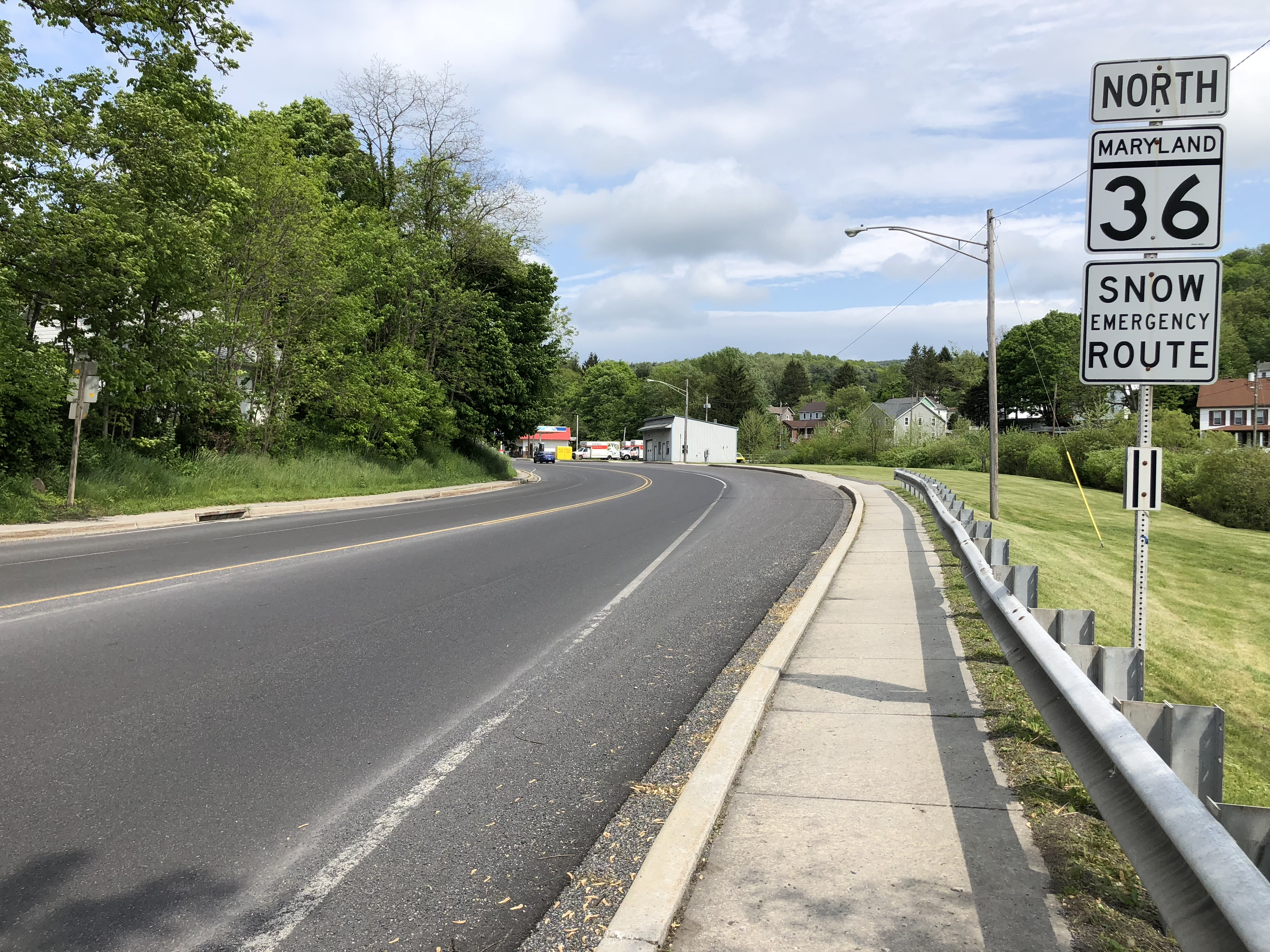
MD 36 northbound past MD 936 in Midland

MD 36 passes through the Georges Creek Valley, which has a long history of coal mining. In recognition of this, the MDSHA has designated MD 36 as part of the Coal Heritage Scenic Byway. Coal mining was a major industry in western Maryland in the 19th century, with railroads being the major route connecting the coal mines to markets outside the Georges Creek Valley. Deep mining, which was the primary mining method used in western Maryland, declined in use after World War II, replaced primarily by surface mining. Although Maryland coal production is now only a small fraction of total U.S. coal production, coal from the Georges Creek Valley is used to power the AES Warrior Run power plant in Cumberland.

MD 36 was assigned a route number before 1927, earlier than most of the other Maryland state highways. The original alignment of MD 36 in southern Allegany County closely paralleled the Georges Creek Railroad. Later realignments have shifted MD 36 away from the railroad in several locations, but three crossings remain: one north of Lonaconing, one south of Lonaconing near the MD 935 intersection, and a third crossing near Westernport.

Over the years, multiple new alignments of MD 36 have been built for various reasons, such as to smooth out curves in the road. Several of the old alignments have been assigned route numbers of their own. The southernmost of these is MD 937, which consists of the old alignment through Westernport. Prior to the construction of the bridge connecting MD 36 to WV 46, MD 937 was the alignment of MD 36 through Westernport, ending at MD 135. In Barton, MD 935 carries the old alignment of MD 36. The longest of the old alignment sections is MD 936, which runs from Midland to Frostburg, and was bypassed in the 1970s with a new alignment of MD 36 following part of MD 55 and connecting to Interstate 68 (I-68). Prior to this change, MD 55 ended in Midland; it has since been truncated to its current terminus at Vale Summit.

North of Frostburg, several old alignments are designated as MD 831, though these segments of road are not signed. Among these segments of road are Kriegbaum Road (designated as MD 831C), and Old Mount Savage Road (designated as MD 831A). Kriegbaum Road splits from MD 36 west of Corriganville and runs through Corriganville, returning to MD 36 east of the town. Old Mount Savage Road intersects MD 36 west of the Cumberland Narrows, and runs southward to intersect US 40 Alt. near its current intersection with MD 36.

== Junction list ==
The entire route is in Allegany County.

Location	mi	km	Destinations	Notes
Westernport	0.00	0.00	WV 46 east (Ashfield Street) – Piedmont	West Virginia state line at North Branch Potomac River; southern terminus
Westernport	0.06	0.097	MD 135 (Church Street) – Luke, McCoole	
Westernport	1.44	2.32	MD 937 south (Creek Side Drive) – Franklin	Northern terminus of MD 937; former alignment of MD 36
Barton	4.07	6.55	MD 935 north (Legislative Road)	Southern terminus of MD 935; former alignment of MD 36
Lonaconing	6.85	11.02	MD 935 south (Legislative Road)	Northern terminus of MD 935
Lonaconing	8.03	12.92	Douglas Avenue north	Former MD 657
Midland	11.06	17.80	MD 936 north via Church Street	Southern terminus of MD 936; former alignment of MD 36
Vale Summit	14.04	22.60	MD 55 north (Vale Summit Road) – Clarysville	Southern terminus of MD 55
Frostburg	15.05	24.22	I-68 / US 40 (National Freeway) – Cumberland, Morgantown	Exit 34 on I-68
Frostburg	16.44	26.46	MD 743 east (Old National Pike) – Eckhart Mines	Western terminus of MD 743
Frostburg	16.53	26.60	US 40 Alt. east (National Pike) – Cumberland	South end of US 40 Alt. overlap
Frostburg	17.07	27.47	MD 936 south (Grant Street)	Northern terminus of MD 936
Frostburg	17.60	28.32	US 40 Alt. west (National Pike)	North end of US 40 Alt. overlap
Zihlman	20.36	32.77	MD 638 south (Parkersburg Road) – Eckhart Mines	Northern terminus of MD 638
Barrelville	24.34	39.17	MD 47 north (Barrelville Road) – Barrelville	Southern terminus of MD 47; connects MD 36 to PA 160
Corriganville	26.64	42.87	MD 831 east (Kreigbaum Road)	Western terminus of MD 831; officially MD 831C; former alignment of MD 36
Corriganville	27.34	44.00	MD 35 north (Ellerslie Road) – Ellerslie	Southern terminus of MD 35; connects MD 36 to PA 96
Corriganville	27.51	44.27	MD 831 west (Kreigbaum Road)	Eastern terminus of MD 831; officially MD 831C
Cumberland	29.05	46.75	MD 831 south (Old Mount Savage Road)	Northern terminus of MD 831; officially MD 831A; former alignment of MD 36
Cumberland	29.43	47.36	US 40 Alt. (National Pike) – Cumberland, Frostburg	Northern terminus
1.000 mi = 1.609 km; 1.000 km = 0.621 mi: Concurrency terminus
