= Georges Creek (Potomac River tributary) =

River in the U.S. state of Maryland

Coordinates: 39°28′59″N 79°02′46″W

Georges Creek is a 17.6-mile-long (28.3 km) tributary stream of the North Branch Potomac River in western Maryland. The creek has its headwaters on Savage Mountain near Frostburg and empties into the North Branch Potomac River at Westernport, all in western Allegany County. Along the Georges Creek Valley, there exists a series of small towns founded in the nineteenth century for miners' homes. The Georges Creek Valley is rich in wide veins of coal, once extracted by deep mines but still mined today through surface mining.

The creek passes through Borden Shaft, Midland, Gilmore, Lonaconing, Nikep, Moscow, and Barton on its way to Westernport. Some of the tributaries running into Georges Creek include Sand Spring Run, Winebrenner Run, Neff Run, Staub Run, Squirrel Neck Run, Elklick Run, Hill Run, Koontz Run, Jackson Run, Laurel Run, Butcher Run, Moores Run, and Mill Run.

== See also ==
- Waverly Street Bridge
