= Georges Creek Railway =

Shortline railroad in Western Maryland, U.S.

Overview
- Headquarters: Luke, Maryland
- Reporting mark: GCK
- Locale: Western Maryland
- Dates of operation: July 10, 2006–2019

Technical
- Track gauge: 4 ft 8 1/2 in (1,435 mm)
- Length: 14 miles (23 km)

The Georges Creek Railway (reporting mark GCK) was a shortline railroad in Western Maryland that performed contract switching, and it owns 14 miles (23 km) of trackage between Westernport and Carlos. The railroad was headquartered at 119 Pratt Street in Luke in the former Luke Post Office. Gerald Altizer and Pat Stakem are the primary partners in the company.

Operating since December 2007 on CSX Transportation and plant trackage, the firm did contract switching services for the Verso (formerly NewPage) Paper Mill in Luke.

An article in the Baltimore Business Journal dated April 30, 2019, announced the closing of the paper mill in Luke by June 30, which affected the employment of the GCK's Alco T-6. Beginning in January 2024, the Western Maryland Scenic Railroad (WMSR) signed a long-term loan to revitalize and eventually operate GCK as the Georges Creek Division for regular excursion and occasional freight operations.

== Acquisition of the Georges Creek Subdivision ==
The acquisition of track for the Georges Creek Railway began 2005, the year CSX had begun the process of abandoning their Georges Creek Subdivision, following two washouts along the right-of-way and the loss of its customers. In December 2005, the deed for the northern 8.54 miles of track from Morrison, Maryland to Carlos, Maryland was transferred to WMS, LLC which would go bankrupt a year later due to investor difficulties. The following year, the Eighteen Thirty Group, LLC and Georges Creek Railway, LLC, filed to acquire and operate the line as Class III common carriers, having purchased the line out of bankruptcy court.

On May 15, 2015, Eighteen Thirty Group with the Georges Creek Railway, LLC filed a notice of intent to acquire 5.4 miles of rail line from CSX: 4.8 miles of the Georges Creek Subdivision between Barton and Westernport, and 0.6 miles of the Thomas Subdivision. The GCK entered an agreement with Eighteen Thirty Group to operate on these lines. This acquisition brought the entirety of the former Georges Creek Subdivision under the control of GCK.

Several right of way improvement projects had been undertaken since March 2016, but the washouts were not repaired, keeping the line north of the village of Moscow inoperable.

== Abandonment and rail conversion ==
Dockets numbered 1293X and 1294X and filed with the Surface Transportation Board on February 3, 2020, stated, "Eighteen Thirty Group, LLC (“Eighteen Thirty”) and Georges Creek Railway (“GCR”) file this Verified Notice of Exemption pursuant to the class exemption at 49 C.F.R. § 1152.50 for Eighteen Thirty to abandon and GCR to discontinue service over an approximately 7.54-mile rail line between milepost BAI 26.00 in Moscow, MD and milepost BAI 18.46 in Shaft, MD, all in Allegany County, MD (the “Line”). No local rail traffic has moved over the Line during the past two years. Any overhead traffic on the Line can be and has been rerouted."

An article in the Cumberland Times-News dated November 27, 2020 stated, "Allegany County officials approved an agreement last week with the Maryland Department of Natural Resources to move forward on plans to construct a hiking and bicycling trail in the Georges Creek area. The project would involve construction of a trail extending 7.5 miles from the Great Allegheny Passage in Frostburg along Georges Creek railroad lines to Barton." The article also stated, "[T]he rail lines through Georges Creek are owned by the Eighteen Thirty Group, which obtained them from CSX Transportation.... [T]he Eighteen Thirty Group has expressed interest in transferring rights to Allegany County with the Maryland Department of Natural Resources stepping forward to remove the tracks and install the trail."

This action would replace the track the Georges Creek Railway has filed to abandon with a trail. This portion of the GCK has not seen a train in decades and is heavily covered in tree and brush growth. Nine Dragons Paper Holdings Limited, which purchased the recycled-content bleached kraft pulp mill in Fairmont, West Virginia, was reportedly interested in buying the Luke plant in 2021. An article dated January 19, 2021 on the website of WCBC Radio stated in part "that a firm is close to finalizing an agreement to purchase the Luke Mill and its wood yard. The firm, known as Whiskey River, would establish a lumber related business at the mill, which was shuttered by Verso Corporation in May of 2019."

By the end of 2021, the Luke Mill site remained dormant and there was no report of its purchase by any company. An article dated May 13, 2022 in the Mineral News and Tribune stated that mill's equipment and assets would be sold at a three-day auction starting on June 1, 2022. Capital Recovery Group, a private equity firm, had become the new owners of the former mill property. The auction of the equipment and assets leaves little likelihood the site will ever reopen as a paper mill again, and rail service to the former mill remains unnecessary.

== Western Maryland Scenic Railroad stewardship ==
In January 2024, following more than two years of negotiations, the Western Maryland Scenic Railroad (WMSR) of Cumberland, Maryland announced their long-term lease of the Georges Creek Railway from the Eighteen Thirty Group. With vegetation growing over the Georges Creek right-of-way, the first task the WMSR intends to accomplish for the railway is to thoroughly investigate the safety improvements required for the rail infrastructure, and they plan to create a trail that would accompany most of trackage to satisfy local bicyclists. The railroad’s eventual goal is to operate the short line as a separate business entity from the main WMSR operations called the Georges Creek Division, and the planned operations will consist of regular tourist excursion trains and occasional freight trains that would interchange with CSX, and the railroad estimates that the operations will boost local economic growth.

== See also ==
- Georges Creek Railroad (1853–1863)
- George's Creek and Cumberland Railroad (1876–1917)
