= Shaw Mansion (Barton, Maryland) =

Historic house in Maryland, United States

- U.S. National Register of Historic Places
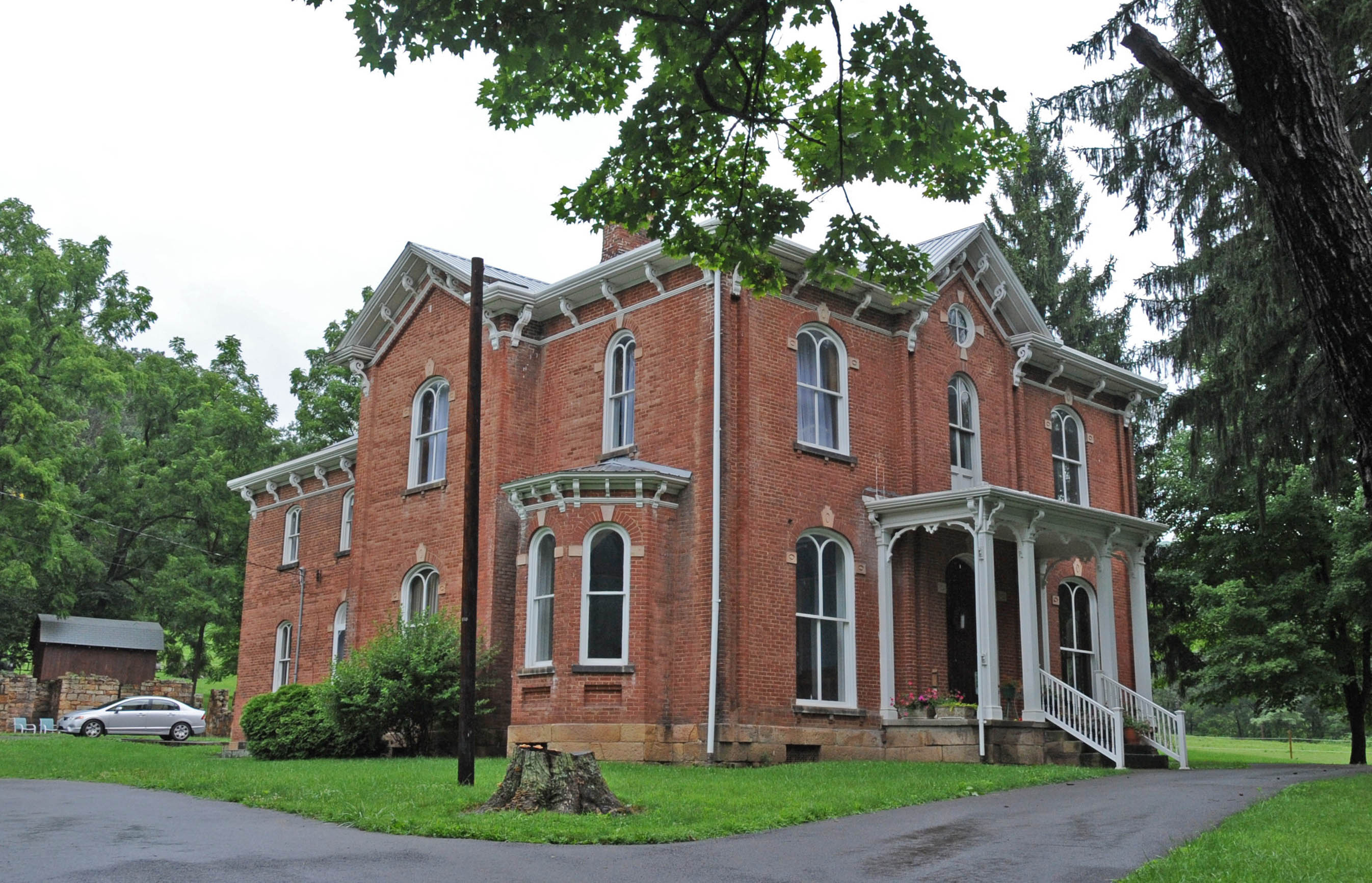
- In 2017

- Location within Maryland Location within the United States
- Location: Laurel Run Cemetery Road, Barton, Maryland
- Coordinates: 39°32′31″N 79°0′28″W
- Area: 5 acres (2.0 ha)
- Built: 1872
- Built by: Shaw, Andrew
- Architectural style: Italianate
- NRHP reference No.: 85001345
- Added to NRHP: June 19, 1985

The Shaw Mansion is an Italianate style house in the George's Creek Valley of Allegany County, Maryland, built in 1872. The house is significant as an unusually large and well-preserved example of the style for its area, with stone trim, detailed brick bonding, cast-iron mantels and much of the original interior woodwork.

It was listed on the National Register of Historic Places in 1985.
