= Barton, Maryland =

Barton
- Town
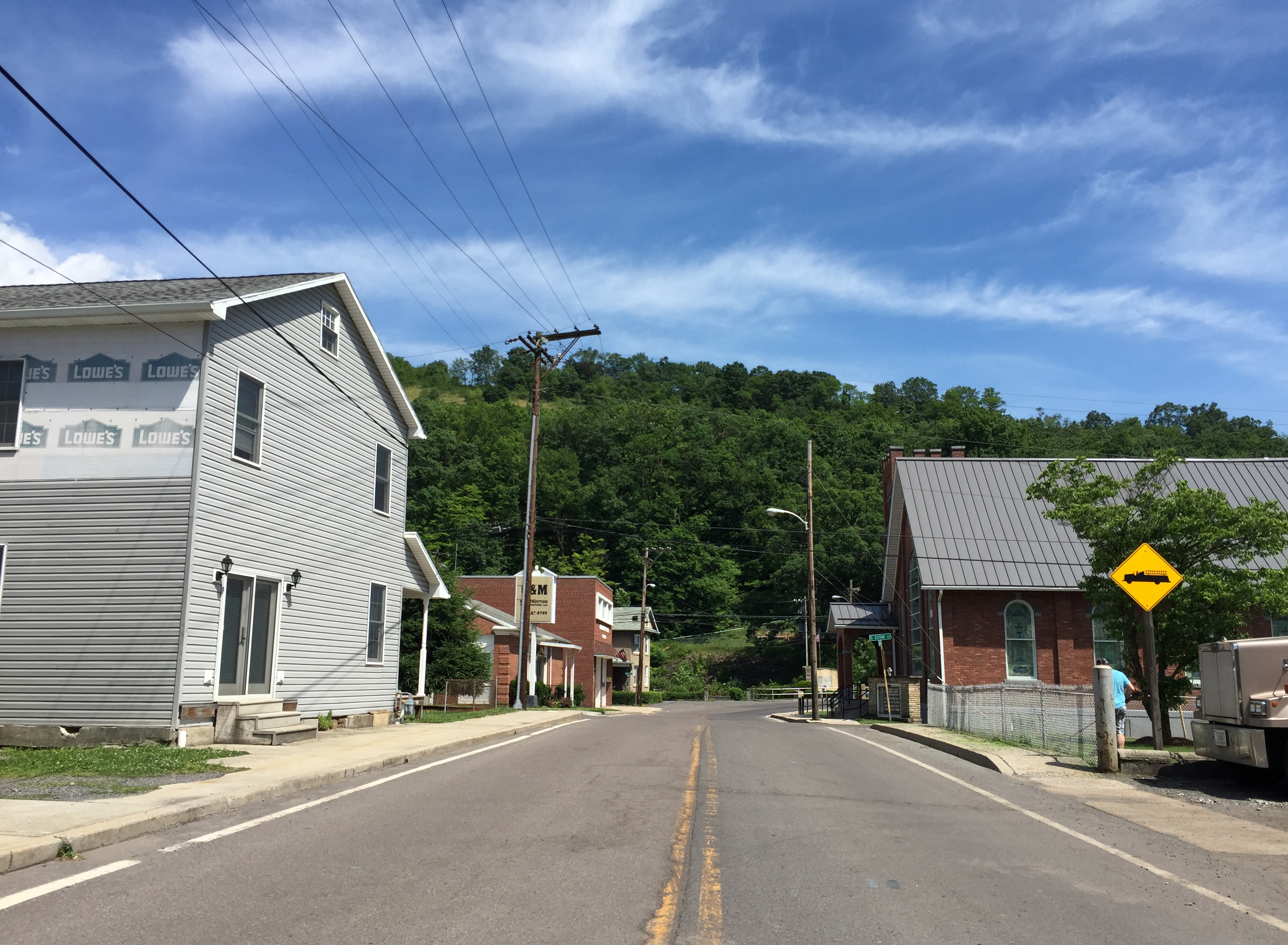
- MD 935 through central Barton
- Etymology: Named for Barton-upon-Humber, England
- Location of Barton, Maryland

- Location within Maryland Location within the United States Location within North America
- Coordinates: 39°31′56″N 79°01′02″W
- Country: United States
- State: Maryland
- County: Allegany
- Incorporated: 1900
- Named for: Barton-upon-Humber, North Lincolnshire, England

Area
  - Total: 0.21 sq mi (0.54 km^{2})
  - Land: 0.21 sq mi (0.54 km^{2})
  - Water: 0.0039 sq mi (0.01 km^{2})
- Elevation: 1,276 ft (389 m)

Population (2020)
  - Total: 464
  - Density: 2,244.5/sq mi (866.61/km^{2})
- Time zone: UTC-5 (Eastern (EST))
  - Summer (DST): UTC-4 (EDT)
- ZIP code: 21521
- Area codes: 301, 240
- FIPS code: 24-04625
- GNIS feature ID: 2390715
- Website: msa.maryland.gov/msa/mdmanual/37mun/barton/html/b.html

Barton is a town in Allegany County, Maryland, United States, located along the Georges Creek Valley. It is part of the Cumberland, MD-WV Metropolitan Statistical Area. As of the 2020 census, Barton had a population of 464.

== History ==
The Reverend William Shaw, a Methodist minister settled on the site of Barton in 1794. His son, William Shaw Jr. laid out the town in 1853, naming it for his father's hometown, Barton-upon-Humber, England.

The discovery of coal in the area attracted more settlers. They came from Scotland, Ireland and Germany, eager to work in the mines. In 1853, the first shipment of coal was made on the newly built Georges Creek Railroad. Eventually, all the deep coal mines had been abandoned and replaced by strip mines, several of which are still in operation and can be seen from the town. Today, most families in Barton are supported by other types of employment.

The first gristmill powered by a water wheel was built on Moores Run by Henry Ingram. It was about 200 to 300 ft. from the confluence of Georges Creek. The mill at Moores Run was owned and tended by Mathias Ball. Ball also owned and ran a tannery at Butcher Run in Barton. The second gristmill was built at Mill Run south of Barton, it was called the Morrison Mill, and was owned by John Morrison. The Morrison Mill was located where Mill Run flows into Georges Creek. John Haymaker also tended the Hockenberry Mill before Hockenberry took over. The third mill was the Shaw Mill, built by the Shaw family. It was a large mill built of stone at Moscow. It was torn down in the summer or fall of 1961.

Major Barton-area coal companies in the 19th century:

- American Coal Company, owner of the Swanton and Caledonia Mines. Their coal tipples were located right in Barton and the mines were located on the mountain on the west side of Barton.
- Davis & Rieman Co.
- Piedmont Coal & Iron Co., located up Temperance Row on the east side of the mountain.
- Potomac Coal Co., located up Moore's Run. The first mine was located about ½ mile from Dogwood Flat and the No. 2 mine was about 1-1/4 mile up the run. Owned by the Union Mining Co.
- Swanton Mining Co.
- George's Creek Mining Co.
- Barton Coal Mining Co., located at the top of Moores Run.

The Barton Coal Company plane (or cable railway) was built in 1854 and was engineered by O.D. Robbins. It remained in operation until March 21, 1898. The next week the tract, cables and mining equipment were removed. Along with the major mines, there were also many small family-owned mines on the family farms, which catered to the local coal trade.

The Pickell Mine was located on the west side of Barton towards Moscow. Its tipple was not located in town.

The Cumberland and Pennsylvania Railroad, successor to the Georges Creek Railroad, opened a train station in Barton in 1889. The station was demolished in the mid-20th century.

Today Barton has four churches and many volunteer groups. There is a lighted ball field, a playground, and two parks for use by citizens. Barton has survived floods and fires and still maintains its peaceful and congenial atmosphere. Each year the town celebrates itself with a Party in the Park. That get-together showcases crafts, food, entertainment, and a parade through the center of town.

Shaw Mansion was listed on the National Register of Historic Places in 1985.

== Geography ==
According to the United States Census Bureau, the town has a total area of 0.22 square miles (0.57 km^{2}), all land.

=== Nearby communities ===
1. Cumberland
2. Lonaconing
3. Westernport
4. Piedmont, West Virginia
5. Luke
6. Midland
7. Keyser, West Virginia
8. Frostburg
9. Cresaptown-Bel Air

== Transportation ==
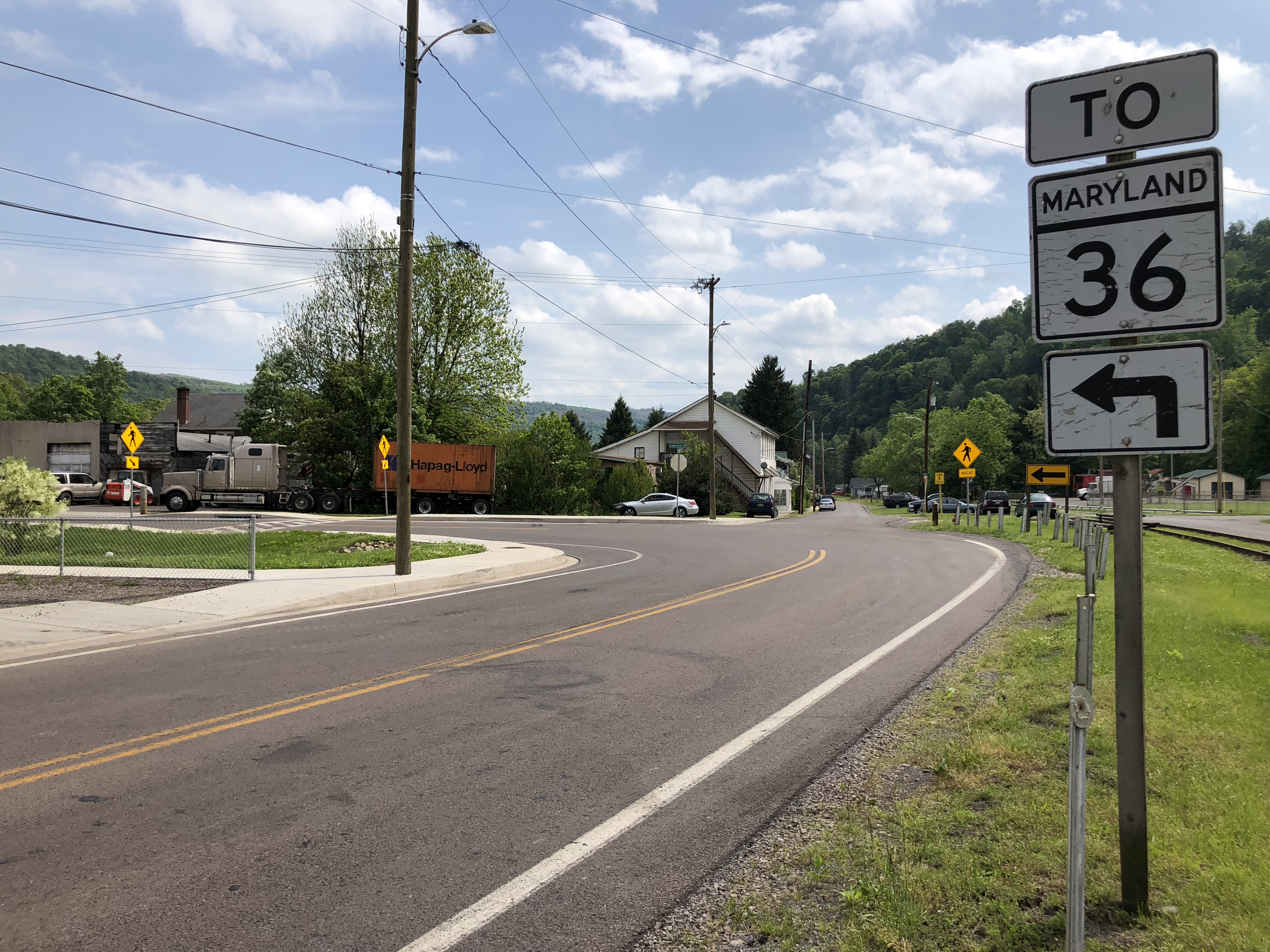
MD 935 through the middle of Barton

The primary means of travel to and from Barton is by road. The only state highway directly serving the town is Maryland Route 935, which mostly follows Legislative Road through the middle of town. MD 935 is the old alignment of Maryland Route 36, which now traverses a bypass on the town's east side. Both ends of MD 935 connect to MD 36, which extends northward to Frostburg and Interstate 68, and heads southward to Westernport.

== Demographics ==
Historical population
Census	Pop.	Note	%±
1880	1,112		—
1920	765		—
1930	689		−9.9%
1940	781		13.4%
1950	695		−11.0%
1960	731		5.2%
1970	723		−1.1%
1980	617		−14.7%
1990	530		−14.1%
2000	478		−9.8%
2010	457		−4.4%
2020	464		1.5%
U.S. Decennial Census

=== 2010 census ===
As of the census of 2010, there were 457 people, 195 households, and 132 families residing in the town. The population density was 2,077.3 inhabitants per square mile (802.1/km^{2}). There were 225 housing units at an average density of 1,022.7 per square mile (394.9/km^{2}). The racial makeup of the town was 98.0% White, 0.2% African American, 0.4% Asian, and 1.3% from two or more races. Hispanic or Latino of any race were 1.3% of the population.

There were 195 households, of which 28.7% had children under the age of 18 living with them, 50.8% were married couples living together, 11.8% had a female householder with no husband present, 5.1% had a male householder with no wife present, and 32.3% were non-families. 27.7% of all households were made up of individuals, and 10.8% had someone living alone who was 65 years of age or older. The average household size was 2.34 and the average family size was 2.83.

The median age in the town was 39.9 years. 20.4% of residents were under the age of 18; 8.9% were between the ages of 18 and 24; 28.2% were from 25 to 44; 25.2% were from 45 to 64; and 17.3% were 65 years of age or older. The gender makeup of the town was 51.0% male and 49.0% female.

=== 2000 census ===
As of the census of 2000, there were 478 people, 200 households, and 142 families residing in the town. The population density was 2,129.8 inhabitants per square mile (822.3/km^{2}). There were 233 housing units at an average density of 1,038.2 per square mile (400.9/km^{2}). The racial makeup of the town was 99.58% White and 0.42% African American.

There were 200 households, out of which 28.5% had children under the age of 18 living with them, 55.5% were married couples living together, 11.0% had a female householder with no husband present, and 29.0% were non-families. 27.5% of all households were made up of individuals, and 16.5% had someone living alone who was 65 years of age or older. The average household size was 2.39 and the average family size was 2.89.

In the town, the population was spread out, with 23.2% under the age of 18, 8.8% from 18 to 24, 25.5% from 25 to 44, 24.5% from 45 to 64, and 18.0% who were 65 years of age or older. The median age was 39 years. For every 100 females, there were 98.3 males. For every 100 females age 18 and over, there were 88.2 males.

The median income for a household in the town was $30,104, and the median income for a family was $33,333. Males had a median income of $29,844 versus $14,196 for females. The per capita income for the town was $14,453. About 13.1% of families and 14.4% of the population were below the poverty line, including 32.7% of those under age 18 and 8.4% of those age 65 or over.

== See also ==
- Georges Creek Valley
