= Shaft, Maryland =

- Census-designated place
- Location within the State of Maryland Shaft, Maryland (the United States)
- Coordinates: 39°37′27″N 78°56′24″W
- Country: United States
- State: Maryland
- County: Allegany

Area
  - Total: 0.80 sq mi (2.06 km^{2})
  - Land: 0.79 sq mi (2.04 km^{2})
  - Water: 0.012 sq mi (0.03 km^{2})
- Elevation: 1,775 ft (541 m)

Population (2020)
  - Total: 208
  - Density: 264.5/sq mi (102.11/km^{2})
- Time zone: UTC−5 (Eastern (EST))
  - Summer (DST): UTC−4 (EDT)
- ZIP code: 21532
- Area codes: 240 and 301
- FIPS code: 24-71460
- GNIS feature ID: 2583687

Shaft is a census-designated place (CDP) in Allegany County, Maryland, United States. As of the 2010 census, the CDP had a population of 235. It is located south of Frostburg, in the Georges Creek Valley. It lies at an elevation of 1,795 feet (547 m).

== History ==
Borden, or Borden Shaft, was the site of a major deep mine in the valley. The principal owners of the mines were the Borden family of Massachusetts. Deep mines were unusual in the area, as most were drift mines in the Big Vein region. In 1907, the mine operator was H. and W. Hitchens Coal company. The C&P railroad delivered the windlass for the mine, then used its railroad crane to set it in place.

== Demographics ==
Historical population
Census	Pop.	Note	%±
2020	208		—
U.S. Decennial Census
