= Midland, Maryland =

Midland
- Town
- Seal

- Location of Midland, Maryland

- Location within Maryland Location within the United States
- Coordinates: 39°35′23″N 78°56′55″W
- Country: United States
- State: Maryland
- County: Allegany
- Incorporated: 1900

Area
  - Total: 0.16 sq mi (0.41 km^{2})
  - Land: 0.16 sq mi (0.41 km^{2})
  - Water: 0 sq mi (0.00 km^{2})
- Elevation: 1,713 ft (522 m)

Population (2020)
  - Total: 488
  - Density: 3,089.2/sq mi (1,192.74/km^{2})
- Time zone: UTC-5 (Eastern (EST))
  - Summer (DST): UTC-4 (EDT)
- ZIP code: 21542
- Area codes: 301, 240
- FIPS code: 24-52475
- GNIS feature ID: 2391301

Midland is a town in Allegany County, Maryland, United States, along the Georges Creek Valley. It is part of the Cumberland, MD-WV Metropolitan Statistical Area. As of the 2020 census, Midland had a population of 488. Midland was founded in 1850 as a coal-mining community, though today only some strip mining remains.

== Geography ==
According to the United States Census Bureau, the town has a total area of 0.19 square miles (0.49 km^{2}), all land.

The town of Midland is 1,600 feet (490 m) above sea level, is located 5 miles (8 km) south of Frostburg and 3 miles (5 km) north of Lonaconing. Paradise Run and Neff's Run carry the precipitation from Dan's Mountain on the east to Georges Creek, while Squirrel Neck Run feeds it from the west off Savage Mountain.

Approximately three miles beyond the town's limits is an outcropping known as Dan's Rock, from which it is possible to view the eastern end of the county and nearby West Virginia.

=== Nearby communities ===
- Cumberland
- Lonaconing
- Frostburg
- Barton
- Cresaptown-Bel Air
- Westernport
- Piedmont, West Virginia
- LaVale
- Keyser, West Virginia

== Demographics ==
Historical population
Census	Pop.	Note	%±
1910	1,173		—
1920	910		−22.4%
1930	865		−4.9%
1940	935		8.1%
1950	889		−4.9%
1960	737		−17.1%
1970	665		−9.8%
1980	601		−9.6%
1990	574		−4.5%
2000	473		−17.6%
2010	446		−5.7%
2020	488		9.4%
U.S. Decennial Census

=== 2010 census ===
As of the census of 2010, there were 446 people, 189 households, and 117 families living in the town. The population density was 2,347.4 inhabitants per square mile (906.3/km^{2}). There were 214 housing units at an average density of 1,126.3 per square mile (434.9/km^{2}). The racial makeup of the town was 98.4% White, 0.2% African American, 0.4% from other races, and 0.9% from two or more races. Hispanic or Latino of any race were 0.9% of the population.

There were 189 households, of which 25.9% had children under the age of 18 living with them, 43.4% were married couples living together, 13.2% had a female householder with no husband present, 5.3% had a male householder with no wife present, and 38.1% were non-families. 33.3% of all households were made up of individuals, and 15.9% had someone living alone who was 65 years of age or older. The average household size was 2.36 and the average family size was 2.92.

The median age in the town was 43.3 years. 19.1% of residents were under the age of 18; 10.5% were between the ages of 18 and 24; 23.1% were from 25 to 44; 27.3% were from 45 to 64; and 20% were 65 years of age or older. The gender makeup of the town was 50.4% male and 49.6% female.

=== 2000 census ===
As of the census of 2000, there were 473 people, 189 households, and 123 families living in the town. The population density was 2,500.3 inhabitants per square mile (965.4/km^{2}). There were 211 housing units at an average density of 1,115.4 per square mile (430.7/km^{2}). The racial makeup of the town was 99.37% White and 0.63% Asian. Hispanic or Latino of any race were 0.42% of the population.

There were 189 households, out of which 26.5% had children under the age of 18 living with them, 52.9% were married couples living together, 10.6% had a female householder with no husband present, and 34.4% were non-families. 30.7% of all households were made up of individuals, and 20.6% had someone living alone who was 65 years of age or older. The average household size was 2.49 and the average family size was 3.10.

In the town, the population was spread out, with 20.9% under the age of 18, 11.4% from 18 to 24, 24.7% from 25 to 44, 25.4% from 45 to 64, and 17.5% who were 65 years of age or older. The median age was 40 years. For every 100 females, there were 84.8 males. For every 100 females age 18 and over, there were 84.2 males.

The median income for a household in the town was $32,404, and the median income for a family was $37,500. Males had a median income of $26,750 versus $22,115 for females. The per capita income for the town was $19,318. About 6.2% of families and 8.1% of the population were below the poverty line, including 9.0% of those under age 18 and 9.8% of those age 65 or over.

== Religion ==
Midland contains two churches—St. Joseph's Catholic Church and Grace United Methodist Church. Both were established in 1891.

== Transportation ==
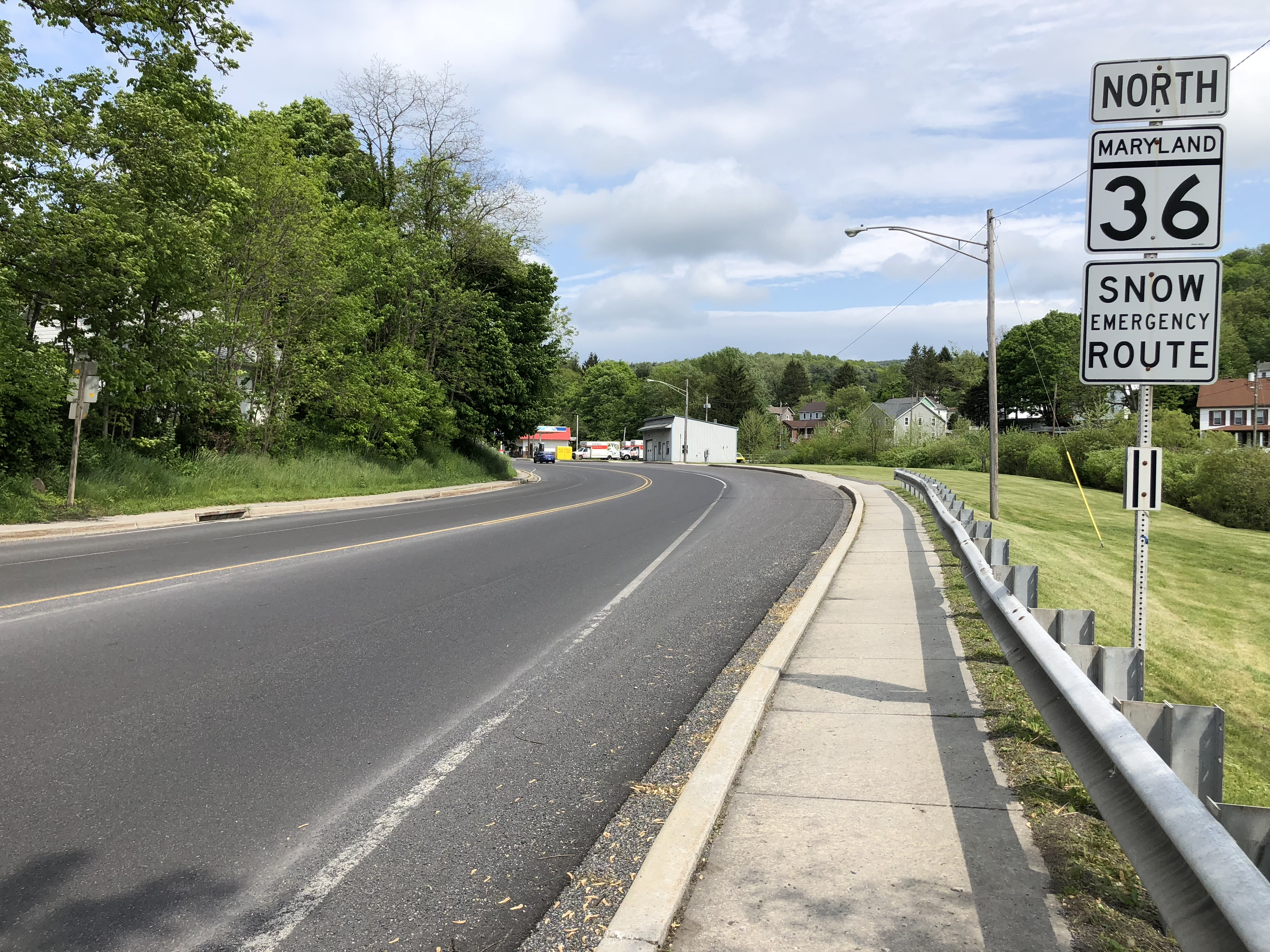
MD 36 northbound in Midland

The main method of travel to and from Midland is by road. The primary highway serving Midland is Maryland Route 36, which travels northward to Frostburg and Interstate 68, and south to Westernport. Maryland Route 936 also serves the town, forming a more direct but slower route between Midland and Frostburg. MD 936 is the old alignment of MD 36.

== Notable person ==
Suzanne Rogers, actress who has played the role of Maggie Simmons Horton on NBC's Days of Our Lives continuously since 1973.
