= Carlos, Maryland =

- Census-designated place
- Location within the State of Maryland Carlos (the United States)
- Coordinates: 39°37′29″N 78°57′26″W
- Country: United States
- State: Maryland
- County: Allegany

Area
  - Total: 0.29 sq mi (0.74 km^{2})
  - Land: 0.29 sq mi (0.74 km^{2})
  - Water: 0 sq mi (0.00 km^{2})
- Elevation: 2,015 ft (614 m)

Population (2020)
  - Total: 144
  - Density: 502.2/sq mi (193.89/km^{2})
- Time zone: UTC−5 (Eastern (EST))
  - Summer (DST): UTC−4 (EDT)
- ZIP code: 21532
- Area codes: 240 and 301
- FIPS code: 24-13225
- GNIS feature ID: 2583594

Carlos is an unincorporated community and census-designated place (CDP) in Allegany County, Maryland, United States. As of the 2010 census it had a population of 153.

Carlos is located 3 miles (5 km) southwest of Frostburg near the western border of Allegany County, at the foot of Big Savage Mountain.

== Demographics ==
Historical population
Census	Pop.	Note	%±
2020	144		—
U.S. Decennial Census
