= Moscow, Maryland =

- Census-designated place
- Location within the State of Maryland Moscow (the United States)
- Coordinates: 39°32′21″N 79°00′29″W
- Country: United States
- State: Maryland
- County: Allegany

Area
  - Total: 0.25 sq mi (0.65 km^{2})
  - Land: 0.24 sq mi (0.63 km^{2})
  - Water: 0.0039 sq mi (0.01 km^{2})
- Elevation: 1,303 ft (397 m)

Population (2020)
  - Total: 219
  - Density: 893.3/sq mi (344.91/km^{2})
- Time zone: UTC−5 (Eastern (EST))
  - Summer (DST): UTC−4 (EDT)
- FIPS code: 24-53700
- GNIS feature ID: 2583660

Moscow is an unincorporated community and census-designated place (CDP) in Allegany County, Maryland, United States. As of the 2010 census it had a population of 240.

Moscow is located in the Georges Creek Valley of western Allegany County, 11 miles (18 km) southwest of Frostburg and 6 miles (10 km) northeast of Westernport.

== Demographics ==
Historical population
Census	Pop.	Note	%±
2020	219		—
U.S. Decennial Census
