= Georges Creek Valley =

Valley in Maryland, United States

Coordinates: 39°34′18″N 78°58′38″W

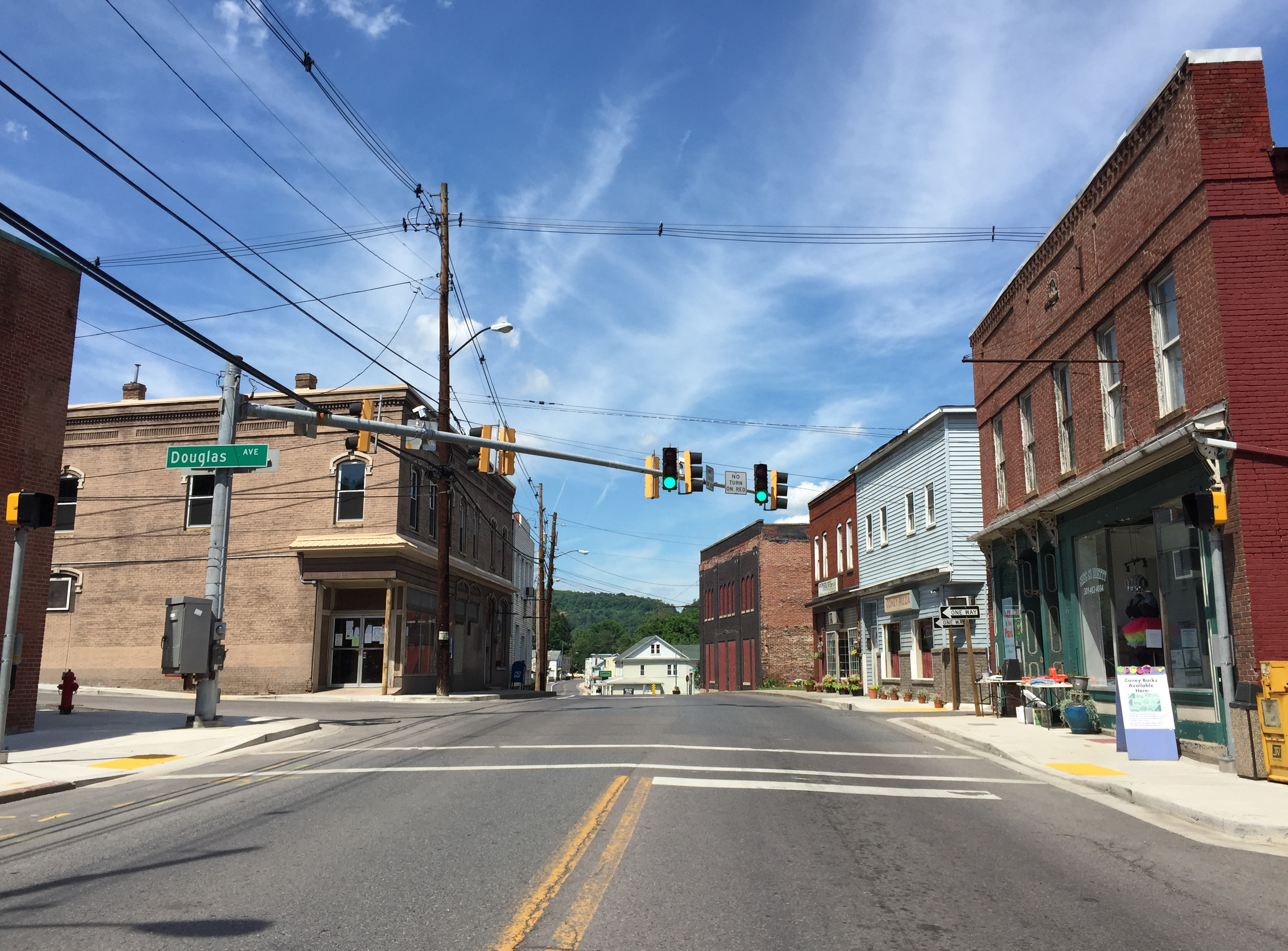
Lonaconing, Maryland, one of the towns in the valley

Georges Creek Valley is located in Allegany County, Maryland along the Georges Creek. The valley is rich in wide veins of coal, known historically as "The Big Vein." Coal was once extracted by deep mines but is only mined today through surface mining. The Georges Creek Valley was once a major center for the US coal industry.

== History ==
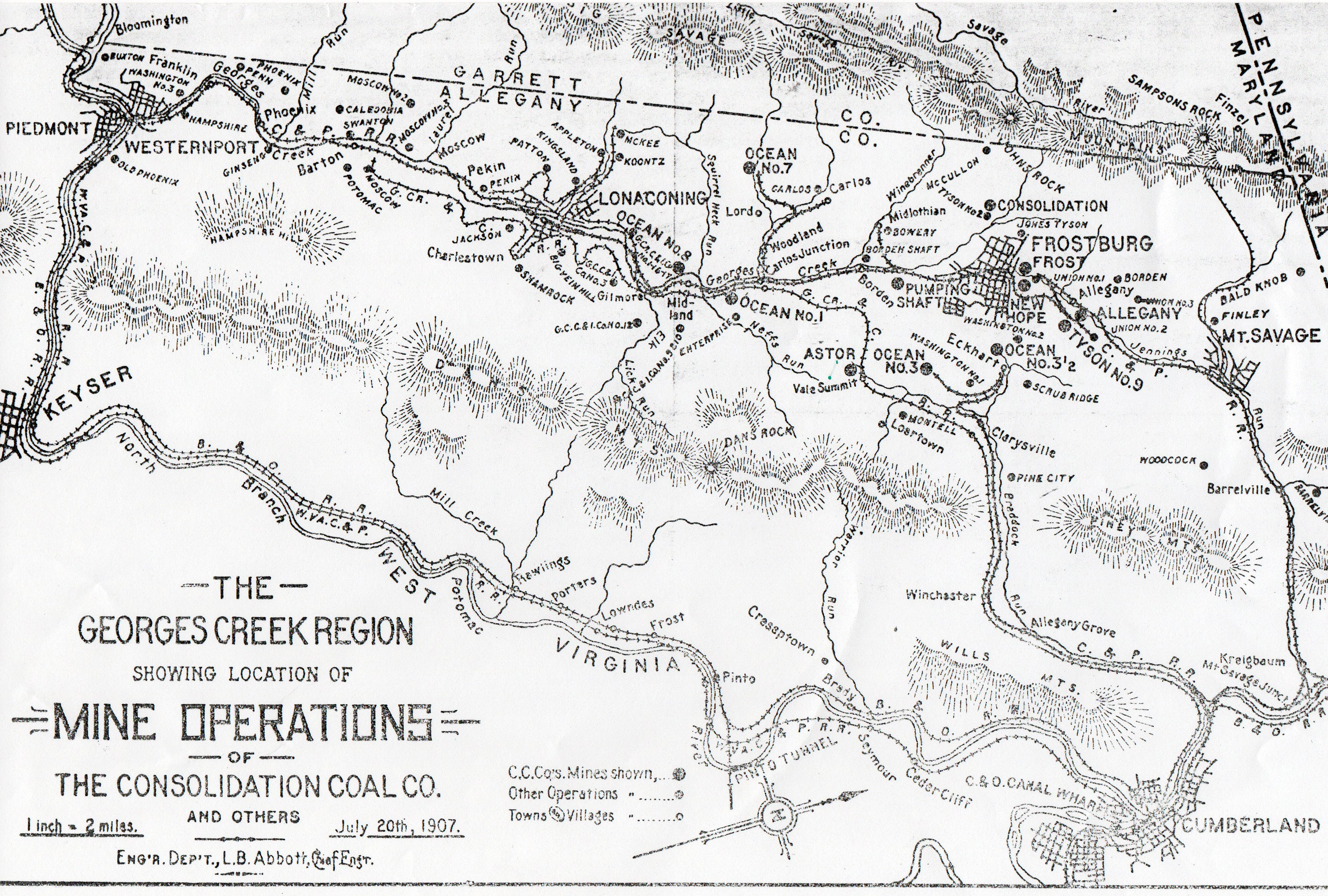
Map of the Georges Creek region, 1907

A series of small mining towns were founded along the Georges Creek Valley in the nineteenth century when coal was discovered in the region. This led mining companies in the valley to develop railroads for transporting the coal. Some of these railroads were merged into the Cumberland and Pennsylvania Railroad System between 1853 and 1870. A competing railroad, the George's Creek and Cumberland Railroad, operated in the valley between 1876 and 1917, followed by the Western Maryland Railway.

Most of the original settlers to the Valley came in response to the abundance of jobs available in the coal mines. Many were Irish, but German, Scottish, and Welsh names also are found in the early records of the town.

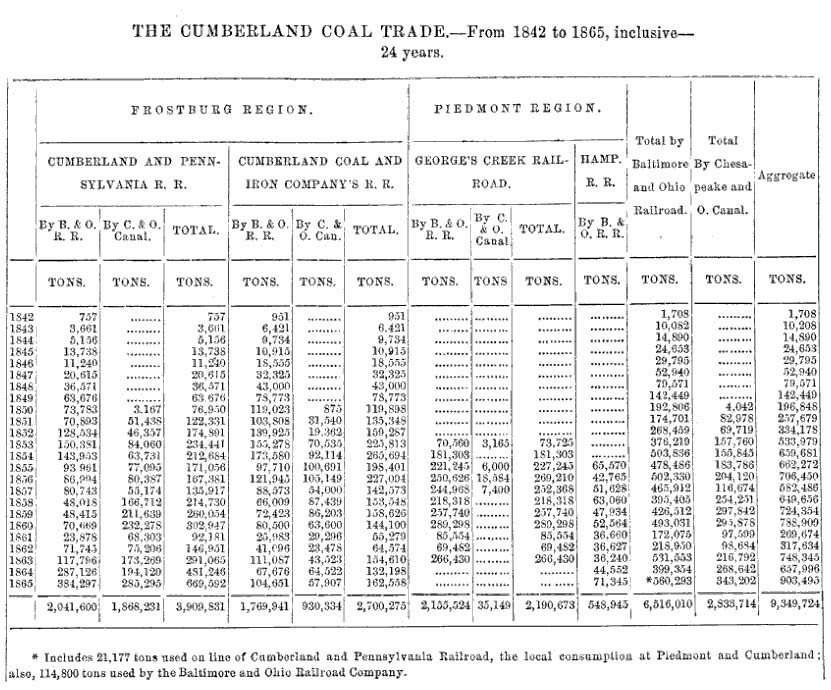
Table of Cumberland Coal Trade Production Levels 1842-1865

Coal mining quickly became the most important industry in the Cumberland area. Some of the richest beds of soft, bituminous coal in the country lay within the hills and mountains of this region. After the Civil War, coal became one of Maryland's chief products and exports. Coal from the Cumberland area fueled the state's mills and plants, steamships in Baltimore's harbor as well as the US Navy fleet, and was traded to buyers from London, Brazil, Egypt, and beyond. Primarily Scottish and Welsh immigrants provided the labor force for these mines, immigrating with their families for the opportunities America offered. In the Cumberland region, miners escaped the indebtedness to the mining company that plagued miners in surrounding states. The company store system, in which miners were forced to purchase all their supplies and household needs from the mining company, was outlawed in Maryland in 1868. A comparatively high proportion of miners were also homeowners, as local mining firms found it more profitable to sell houses to their miners, than establish "company" housing.

Since regional coal mines were constructed with horizontal shafts, they were far less dangerous than the vertical shaft mines of Pennsylvania and West Virginia. Still, the regional miners, blackened from head to foot when they emerged from a mine at the end of a day, knew that the carbon-filled air, which corroded the lungs over time, would lead to an early death.

After World War I, coal production started to decline, and today only some strip mining remains as the last vestige of this once all-important industry. Coal trains once went through the valley every day, but now do so only once or twice a month.

== Towns in the Valley ==
- Westernport: Westernport is the terminus of Georges Creek, where it empties into the North Branch of the Potomac River. The town derives its name from being the westernmost navigable port on the river. In the late 18th century and early to mid part of the 19th century, coal and timber were loaded onto flatboats at Westernport and floated down to near Great Falls, Virginia, where the goods were unloaded, the boats broken up to sell as lumber, and the operators walked back to Westernport. The town of Piedmont, West Virginia, lies directly adjacent to Westernport on the other side of the Potomac.
- Barton: The Reverend William Shaw, a Methodist minister, settled on the site of Barton in 1794. His son, William Shaw, Jr., laid out the town in 1853, naming it for his father's hometown, Barton-upon-Humber, England.
- Lonaconing: The first non-Indian settlers in the late 18th century were explorers, hunters and farmers. Names of some of the first settlers were Dye, Duckworth, Green, Fazenbaker, Beeman, Grove, VanBuskirk, Knapp and Miller. The first stone house built in 1797 in Knapps Meadow just north of Lonaconing was owned by Samuel VanBuskirk. The house still stands as of 2005.
- Midland
- Frostburg: Frostburg is the home of Frostburg State University, an institution within the University System of Maryland.

== Notable residents ==
- Lefty Grove - Lonaconing
- Leo Mazzone - Westernport
- William Shaw - Barton

== Local dialect ==
Locals pronounce the "creek: in Georges Creek as crick by locals, though they pronounce other streams as creek.

Heavy Scottish heritage in the area give locals a dialect unique in the area. Many outsiders confuse the local dialect with that of Ontario, Canada, which it closely resembles. However, the use of terms like "crick" and others like "crawfish" for "crayfish" are indicative of the Western Pennsylvania English dialect.

== See also ==
- Maryland Route 36
