= Westernport, Maryland =

Westernport
- Town
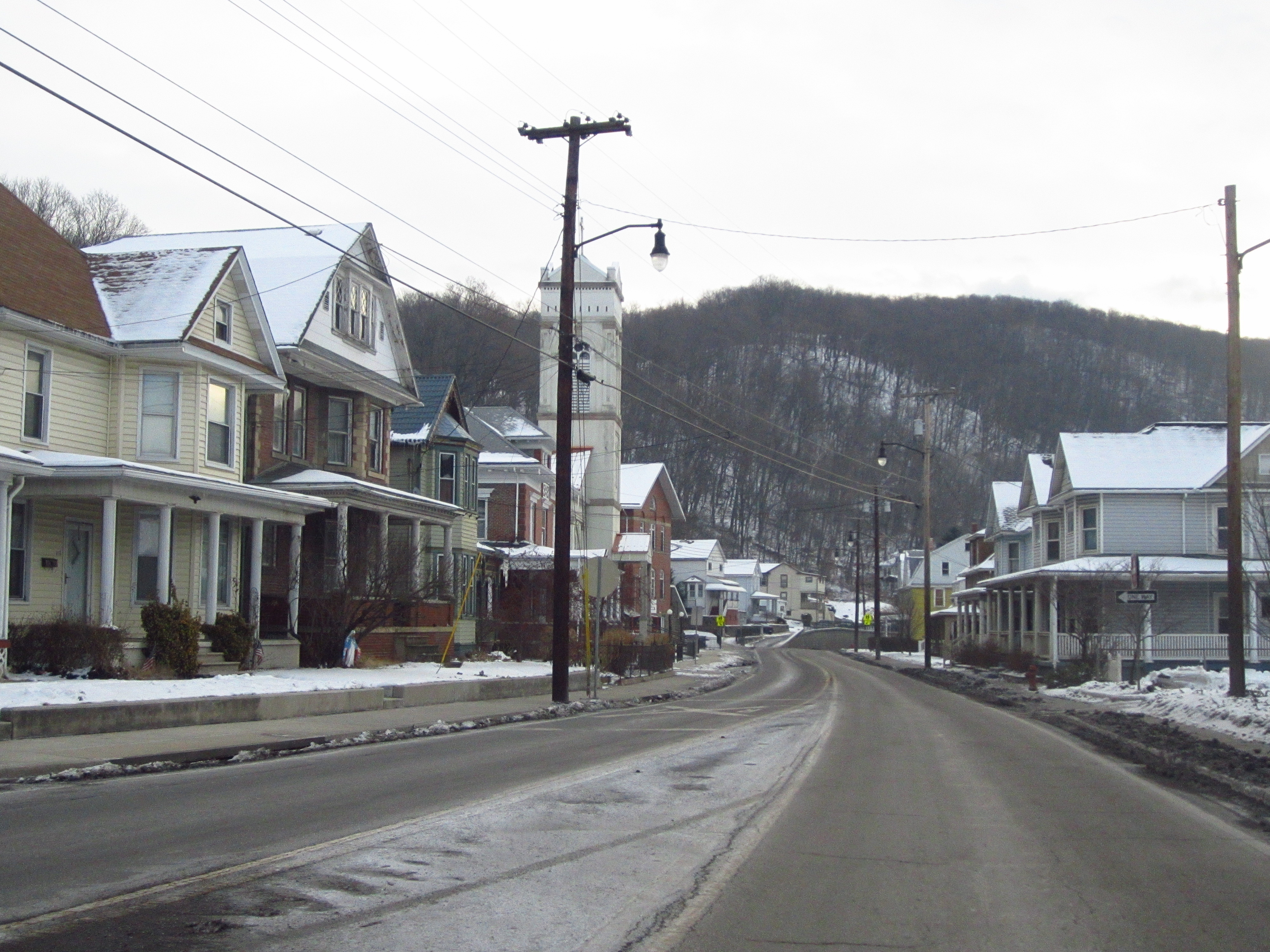
- Downtown looking east on Church St in January 2014

- Flag Seal

- Location of Westernport, Maryland

- Location within Maryland Location within the United States
- Coordinates: 39°29′17″N 79°02′34″W
- Country: United States
- State: Maryland
- County: Allegany
- Settled: 1758
- Incorporated: 1859

Area
  - Total: 0.91 sq mi (2.35 km^{2})
  - Land: 0.88 sq mi (2.28 km^{2})
  - Water: 0.027 sq mi (0.07 km^{2})
- Elevation: 971 ft (296 m)

Population (2020)
  - Total: 1,812
  - Density: 2,062.2/sq mi (796.23/km^{2})
- Time zone: UTC-5 (Eastern (EST))
  - Summer (DST): UTC-4 (EDT)
- ZIP code: 21562
- Area codes: 301, 240
- FIPS code: 24-82750
- GNIS feature ID: 2391482
- Website: https://townofwesternport.com/?fs=e&s=cl

Westernport is a town in Allegany County, Maryland, United States, along the Georges Creek Valley. It is part of the Cumberland micropolitan area. As of the 2020 census, Westernport had a population of 1,812.

== History ==
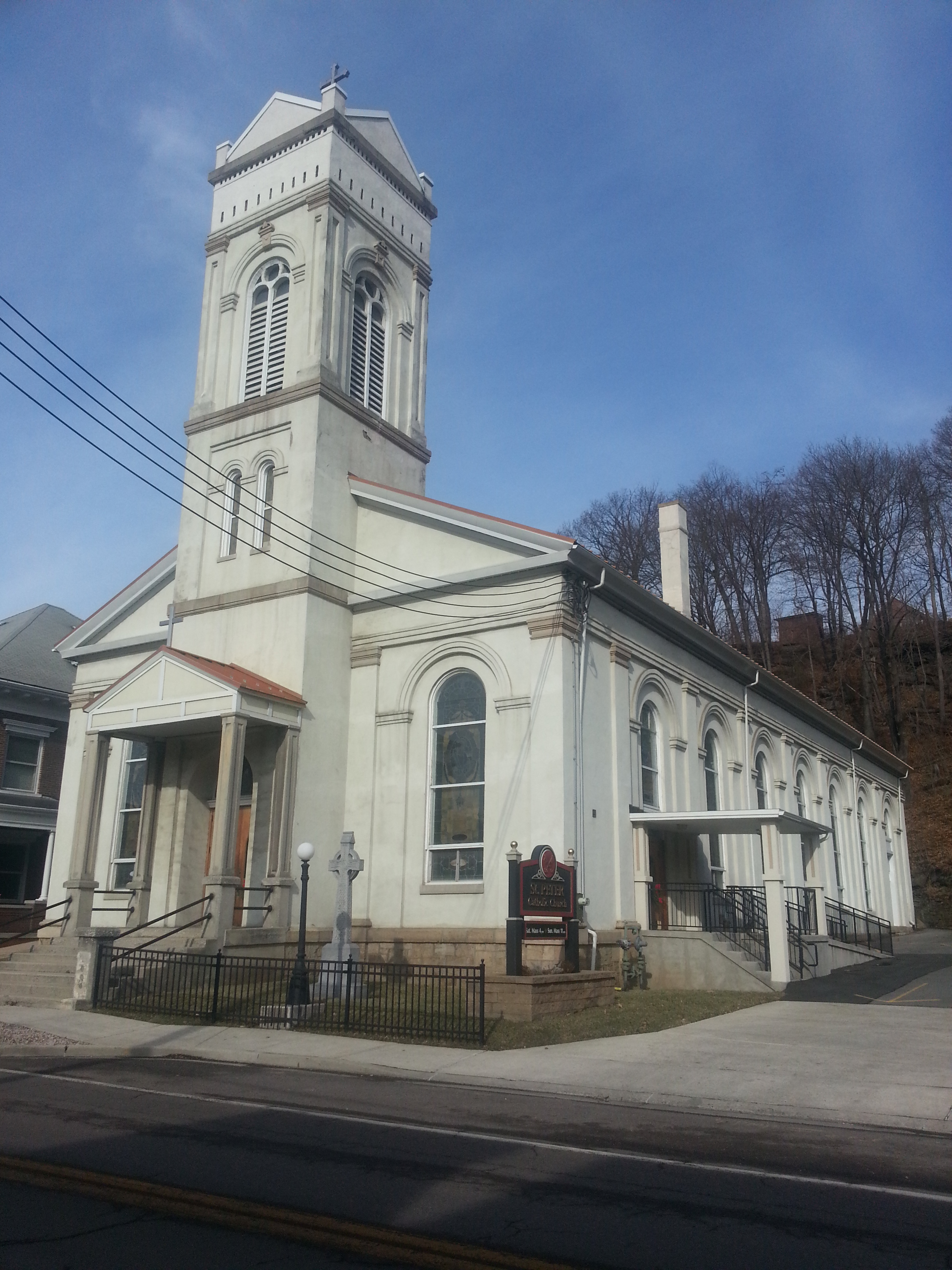
St. Peter Catholic Church on Church St in January 2014

Westernport's first settlement is identified on a French military map dating from 1758. The map is currently on display at École Militaire in Paris. The settlement at that time had no name. By 1774, it was known as Hardscrabble because the rocky soil made planting difficult. Some time in the mid-1790s, the name was changed to Westernport, with the town being the westernmost navigable port on the Potomac River. In the late 18th century and early to mid part of the 19th century, coal and timber was loaded onto flatboats where George's Creek empties into the Potomac, then floated down to near Great Falls, Virginia, where the goods were unloaded, the boats broken up to sell as lumber, with the operators walking back to Westernport. The town was incorporated in 1859.

In 1886–87 the Piedmont and Cumberland Railway was built through Westernport, connecting the town to Cumberland.

== Notable people ==
- Stephen Wheeler Downey, the "Father of the University of Wyoming", was born in Westernport.
- Leo Mazzone, former pitching coach of the Baltimore Orioles and Atlanta Braves

== Geography ==
According to the United States Census Bureau, the town has a total area of 0.89 square miles (2.31 km^{2}), of which 0.87 square miles (2.25 km^{2}) is land and 0.02 square miles (0.05 km^{2}) is water.

=== Nearby communities ===
- Barton, Maryland
- Cumberland, Maryland
- Elk Garden, West Virginia
- Keyser, West Virginia
- Kitzmiller, Maryland
- Lonaconing, Maryland
- Luke, Maryland
- Midland, Maryland
- Piedmont, West Virginia

=== Climate ===
The climate in this area has mild differences between highs and lows, and there is adequate rainfall year-round. According to the Köppen Climate Classification system, Westernport has a marine west coast climate, abbreviated "Cfb" on climate maps.

== Transportation ==
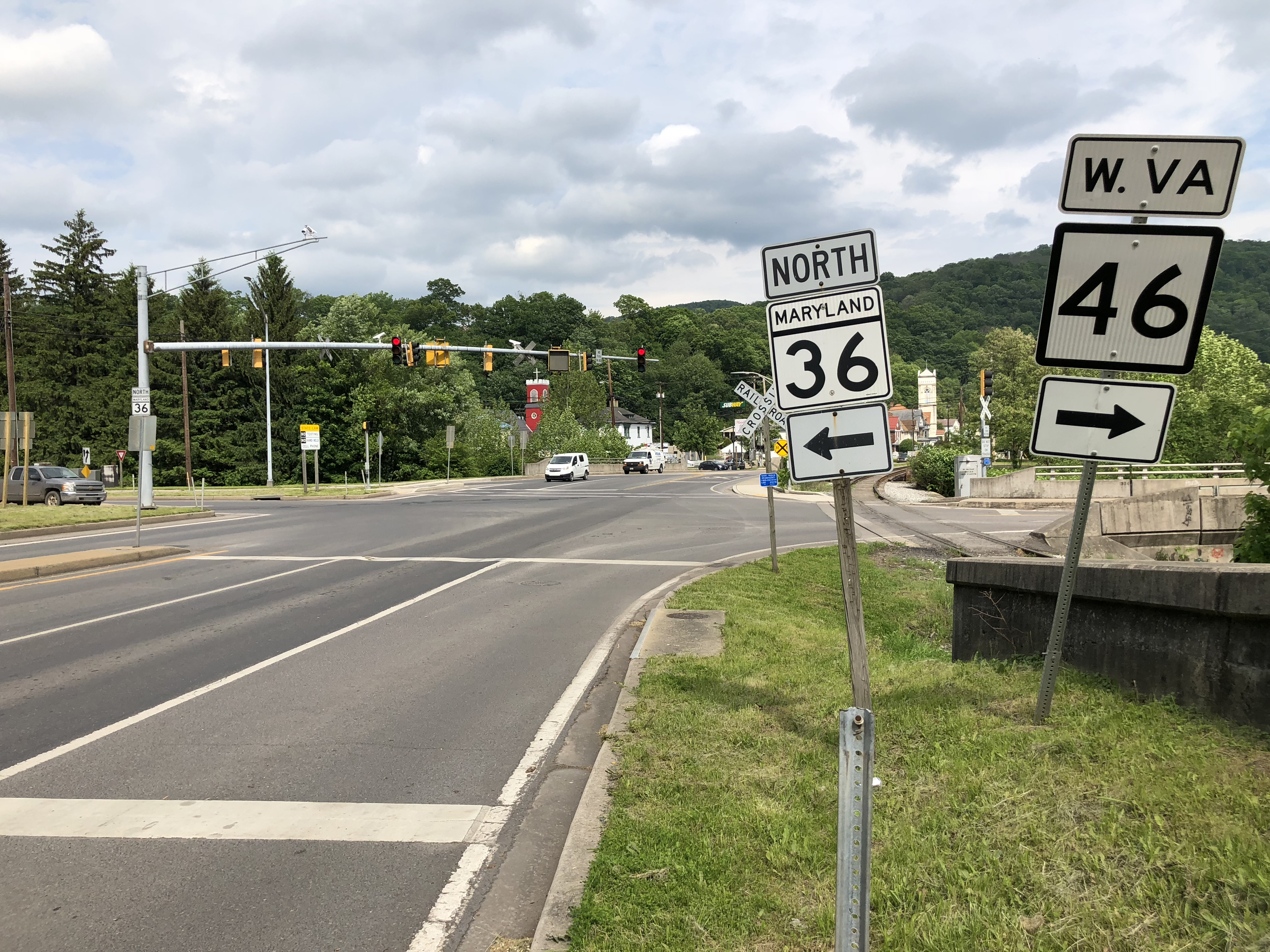
The junction of MD 36 and MD 135 in Westernport

=== Roadways ===
The primary means of travel to and from Westernport are by road. The main highways serving the town are Maryland Route 36 and Maryland Route 135. To the south, MD 36 connects the town to West Virginia Route 46 on the other side of the North Branch Potomac River in Piedmont, while heading north, MD 36 passes Interstate 68 on its way to Frostburg. MD 135 connects eastward to U.S. Route 220 just north of Keyser. To the west, MD 135 eventually reaches U.S. Route 219 in Oakland. Within the town limits, Maryland Route 937 also serves locals, having formerly been the alignment of MD 36.

=== Public transportation ===
The Potomac Valley Transit Authority offers service to the town via bus route 104 with stops at the town's McDonald's and the towns Boal's. With this route you can connect to the neighboring towns of Piedmont, WV and Keyser, WV.

Allegany County also provides transit to the town.

== Demographics ==
Historical population
Census	Pop.	Note	%±
1880	1,468		—
1890	1,526		4.0%
1900	1,998		30.9%
1910	2,702		35.2%
1920	3,977		47.2%
1930	3,440		−13.5%
1940	3,565		3.6%
1950	3,431		−3.8%
1960	3,559		3.7%
1970	3,106		−12.7%
1980	2,706		−12.9%
1990	2,454		−9.3%
2000	2,104		−14.3%
2010	1,888		−10.3%
2020	1,812		−4.0%
U.S. Decennial Census

=== 2020 census ===
As of the 2020 census, Westernport had a population of 1,812. The median age was 40.8 years. 23.5% of residents were under the age of 18 and 20.6% of residents were 65 years of age or older. For every 100 females there were 95.0 males, and for every 100 females age 18 and over there were 91.7 males age 18 and over.

0.0% of residents lived in urban areas, while 100.0% lived in rural areas.

There were 757 households in Westernport, of which 31.2% had children under the age of 18 living in them. Of all households, 42.9% were married-couple households, 18.8% were households with a male householder and no spouse or partner present, and 30.1% were households with a female householder and no spouse or partner present. About 29.5% of all households were made up of individuals and 16.0% had someone living alone who was 65 years of age or older.

There were 937 housing units, of which 19.2% were vacant. The homeowner vacancy rate was 5.4% and the rental vacancy rate was 15.7%.

Racial composition as of the 2020 census
Race	Number	Percent
White	1,737	95.9%
Black or African American	10	0.6%
American Indian and Alaska Native	1	0.1%
Asian	6	0.3%
Native Hawaiian and Other Pacific Islander	0	0.0%
Some other race	1	0.1%
Two or more races	57	3.1%
Hispanic or Latino (of any race)	30	1.7%

=== 2010 census ===
As of the census of 2010, there were 1,888 people, 810 households, and 532 families living in the town. The population density was 2,170.1 inhabitants per square mile (837.9/km^{2}). There were 1,006 housing units at an average density of 1,156.3 units per square mile (446.4 units/km^{2}). The racial makeup of the town was 98.6% White, 0.5% African American, 0.1% Asian, and 0.7% from two or more races. Hispanic or Latino of any race were 0.4% of the population.

There were 810 households, of which 27.0% had children under the age of 18 living with them, 50.0% were married couples living together, 9.9% had a female householder with no husband present, 5.8% had a male householder with no wife present, and 34.3% were non-families. 31.5% of all households were made up of individuals, and 16.6% had someone living alone who was 65 years of age or older. The average household size was 2.33 and the average family size was 2.88.

The median age in the town was 44 years. 20.4% of residents were under the age of 18; 9% were between the ages of 18 and 24; 21.8% were from 25 to 44; 27.6% were from 45 to 64; and 21.2% were 65 years of age or older. The gender makeup of the town was 48.7% male and 51.3% female.

=== 2000 census ===
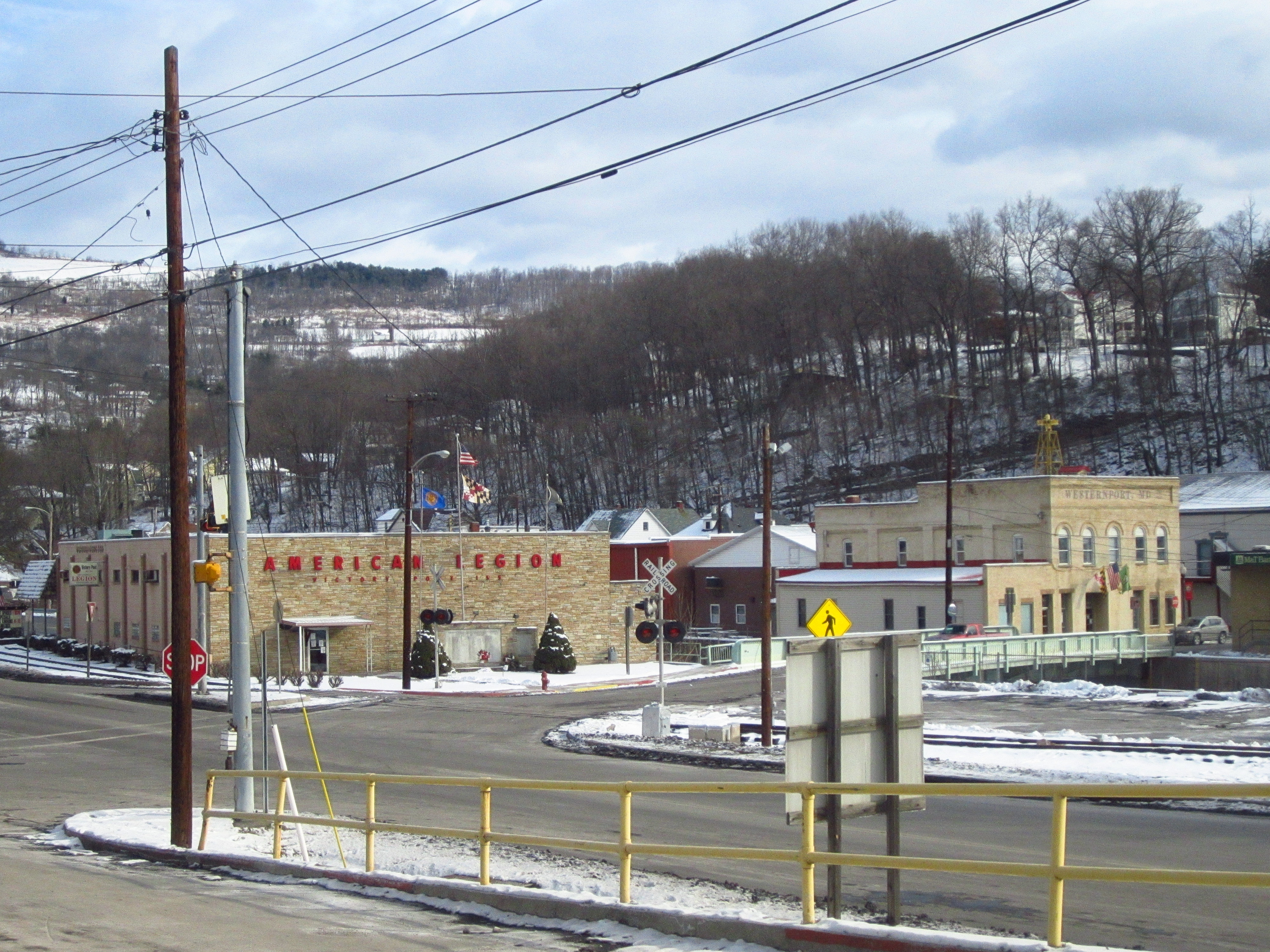
American Legion building in downtown in January 2014

As of the census of 2000, there were 2,104 people, 909 households, and 601 families living in the town. The population density was 2,385.6 inhabitants per square mile (921.1/km^{2}). There were 1,056 housing units at an average density of 1,197.3 units per square mile (462.3 units/km^{2}). The racial makeup of the town was 99.24% White, 0.19% African American, 0.10% Native American, 0.14% Asian, and 0.33% from two or more races. Hispanic or Latino of any race were 0.29% of the population.

There were 909 households, out of which 27.8% had children under the age of 18 living with them, 50.2% were married couples living together, 11.9% had a female householder with no husband present, and 33.8% were non-families. 31.7% of all households were made up of individuals, and 20.9% had someone living alone who was 65 years of age or older. The average household size was 2.31 and the average family size was 2.88.

The age distribution is 22.6% under the age of 18, 8.0% from 18 to 24, 25.9% from 25 to 44, 20.7% from 45 to 64, and 22.8% who were 65 years of age or older. The median age was 41 years. For every 100 females, there were 91.6 males. For every 100 females age 18 and over, there were 86.1 males.

The median income for a household in the town was $23,681, and the median income for a family was $31,714. Males had a median income of $34,896 versus $16,920 for females. The per capita income for the town was $12,503. About 12.1% of families and 16.5% of the population were below the poverty line, including 18.9% of those under age 18 and 14.2% of those age 65 or over.
