= Bedford Branch =

Map

The Bedford Branch, previously the Bedford Division and then the Juniata Division, was a rail line owned and operated by the Pennsylvania Railroad, Middle Division in the U.S. state of Pennsylvania.

The line ran from the Morrisons Cove Branch at Brookes Mills south via Bedford to the Maryland state line. The PRR had trackage rights south to Cumberland over the Western Maryland Railway's State Line Branch. Only the line from Brookes Mills south to Sproul is still in use, as a line of the Everett Railroad.

== History ==
The Bedford and Bridgeport Railroad opened from the state line north via Bedford to Mount Dallas (at the Huntingdon and Broad Top Mountain Railroad and Coal Company) in 1871; the Cumberland and Pennsylvania Railroad built a connecting branch in Maryland. The Dunnings Creek Branch, later part of the main line, opened from Dunnings Creek Junction (near Bedford) north, through Cessna, to ore mines at Holderbaum in 1873. The Pennsylvania Railroad in Maryland was chartered in 1876 to build an independent connection from the state line to Cumberland. The road opened in 1879 and in 1888 was merged into the Georges Creek and Cumberland Railroad and later became part of the Western Maryland Railway.

In 1891, the Bedford and Hollidaysburg Railroad opened an extension from Cessna north to near Imler, and completed the line to Brookes Mills in 1910. This connected it to the rest of the PRR system via the Morrisons Cove Branch; it had formerly only been connected via the Huntingdon and Broad Top Mountain Railroad and Coal Company.

== Infrastructure ==
Two editions of the Pennsylvania Railroad's CT 1000, Lists of Stations and Sidings and Instructions for Making Reports to the Superintendent Car Service, (1923, 1945) serve as the basic guide for the line.

=== Brookes Mills, Pa to Dunning's Creek Junction, Pa ===
	Station	CT-1000 Edition	Note	Lineside Facilities	Dist. from Brookes Mills
5115	Brookes Mills, Pa	1923/1945	Jct. Morison's Cove Branch	Telephone Office	0.0
5115	Brookes Mills, Pa	1923	Jct. Morison's Cove Branch	Passing Siding	0.2
	BROOK		Block-Limit Station		0.0
4070	Brookes Mills, Pa	1923	Station	No siding	0.0
4070	Brookes Mills, Pa	1923/1945	Passing Siding	No carload delivery	0.2
4070	Brookes Mills, Pa	1923	Interchange Siding	Siding - No carload delivery	0.4
4070	Brookes Mills, Pa	1945	Standard Oil Co. No. 3	Siding for individual use	1.1
4071	East Freedom, Pa	1945	Station	Telephone Office	1.5
		1923	E. R. Baldridge & Co. No. 1	Siding for individual use	5.4
4072	Claysburg, Pa	1923/1945	General Refractories Co. No. 6	Siding for individual use	5.4
4072	Claysburg, Pa	1923/1945	Station	Telephone Office Water tower	6.1
4072	Claysburg, Pa	1945	L. H. Diehl	Siding for individual use	6.2
4072	Claysburg, Pa	1923/1945	Passing Siding	No carload delivery	6.3
4074	Sproul, Pa	1923/1945	General Refractories Co. No. 3 ('23), No. 7 ('45)	Siding for individual use	7.4
4074	Sproul, Pa	1923	Station	Telephone Office	7.6
4075	Queen, Pa	Prior to 1923	Passing Siding		
4075	Queen, Pa	1923	Station	Telephone Office	9.2
4075	Queen, Pa	1945		Telephone Office	9.2
4076	Summit, Pa	1923	Passing Siding	No carload delovery	10.2
4078	Imler, Pa	1923/1945	Passing Siding	No carload delivery	13.0
4078	Imler, Pa	1923	Station	Telephone Office	13.3
4080	Osterberg, Pa	1923	Passing Siding	No carload delivery	15.6
4080	Osterberg, Pa	1923	Station	Telephone Office	15.7
4080	Osterberg, Pa	1945		Telephone Office	15.7
4081	Reynoldsdale, Pa	1923	Passing Siding	No carload delivery	18.0
4081	Reynoldsdale, Pa	1923	Station	Telephone Office	18.1
4081	Reynoldsdale, Pa	1945		Telephone Office	18.1
4082	Fishertown, Pa	1923/1945	Station	Telephone Office	20.3
4084	Cessna, Pa	1923/1945	Passing Siding	No carload delivery	22.0
4085	Cessna, Pa	1923	Station	Telephone Office	22.6
4085	Cessna, Pa	1945		Telephone Office	22.6
4085	Cessna, Pa	1923	Blackburn Milling Co.	Siding for individual use	22.6
	Smith's Crossing, Pa	1923	Station	No siding	24.1
	Hughes, Pa	1923	Station	No siding	25.9
4090	Younts, Pa	1923	Station		27.3
4090	Younts, Pa	1945			27.3
4091	Younts, Pa	1923	Passing siding	No carload delivery	27.5
	Chalybeate, Pa	1923	Station	No siding	29.9
	CREEK		Block-Limit Station		30.4
4092	Dunning's Creek Jct	1945		No siding	30.5

=== Mt. Dallas Branch, Pa ===
	Station	CT-1000 Edition	Note	Lineside Facilities	Distance From Mt. Dallas	Distance From Brookes Mills
	CREEK		Block-Limit Station		7.0	30.4
4092	Dunning's Creek Jct	1923/1945	Jct Mt. Dallas Branch	No siding	6.9	30.5
4150	Cliffs, Pa	1923	Station	No siding	6.4	31.0
4150	Cliffs, Pa	1923	Tate Ganister Rock Co.	For individual use	6.2	31.2
4148	Hartley, Pa	1923	Station	No siding	4.2	33.2
4148	Hartley, Pa	1923	Passing	No carload delivery	4.3	33.1
4147	Lutzville, Pa	1923	Station		3.3	34.1
4147	Lutzville, Pa	1945			3.3	34.1
4146	Ashcom, Pa	1923	J. E. Thropp No. 4	For individual use	1.7	35.7
4146	Ashcom, Pa	1945	New Enterprise Stone & Lime Co. No. 2	For individual use	1.7	35.7
4146	Ashcom, Pa	1923	Station		1.7	35.7
4145	Earlston, Pa	1923	Barclay Gannister Rock Co.	For individual use	0.3	37.1
4145	Earlston, Pa	1923	J. E. Thropp No. 1	For individual use/Switch connection with H&BTMRR	0.3	37.1
MD	Mt. Dallas, Pa	1923/1945	Jct H&BTMRR	Telephone Office		37.4
MD	Mt. Dallas, Pa	1923/1945	Passing Siding	No carload delivery		37.4
	DALLAS		Block-Limit Station			37.4

=== Dunning's Creek Junction, Pa to Cumberland, Md ===
	Station	CT-1000 Edition	Note	Lineside Facilities	Distance From Mt. Dallas	Distance From Brookes Mills
		1923	Allen C. Blackburn	For individual use	7.3	30.9
4152	Bedford, Pa	1945	Kund Cabinet Co.	For individual use	7.3	30.9
4152	Bedford, Pa	1923/1945	Davidson Bros.	For individual use	7.8	31.4
4152	Bedford, Pa	1923	Bedford Electric Light, Heat, & Power Co	For individual use	7.8	31.4
4152	Bedford, Pa	1923/1945	Public Delivery	For individual use	7.9	31.5
4152	Bedford, Pa	1923	Blackburn-Russell Co, and Public Delivery	For individual use	7.9	31.5
4152	Bedford, Pa	1923	Public Delivery and H. C. Metzger Supply Co.	For individual use	7.9	31.5
4152	Bedford, Pa	1945	Blackburn-Russell Co. and Freight House	For individual use	7.9	31.5
4152	Bedford, Pa	1945	FORD - Block-Limit Station		7.9	31.5
4152	Bedford, Pa	1945	W. R. Lysinger and May & Bigley	For individual use	8.0	31.6
4152	Bedford, Pa	1923/1945	Station	Telephone Office	8.0	31.6
4152	Bedford, Pa	1923/1945	Station	Water tower	8.0	31.6
4152	Bedford, Pa	1923/1945	Station	Turntable and Engineshed	8.0	31.6
4152	Bedford, Pa	1923/1945	Carlton Heckerman	For individual use	8.3	31.9
4152	Bedford, Pa	1945	Sinclair Refining Co. No. 5	For individual use	8.3	31.9
4152	Bedford, Pa	1945	Public delivery	For individual use	8.3	31.9
4152	Bedford, Pa	1923/1945	Supplee-Wills-Jones Co. No. 2	For individual use	8.4	32.0
4152	Bedford, Pa	1945	The Texas Co.	For individual use	8.4	32.0
4152	Bedford, Pa	1945	Petroleum Economy Products Co.	For individual use	8.5	32.1
4155	Wolfsburg, Pa	1923	Station	Telephone Office	10.8	34.5
4155	Wolfsburg, Pa	1945			10.8	34.5
4155A	Atlantic Refining Co. No. 9	1923/1945		For individual use	11.5	35.2
4156	E. R. Baldridge & Co. No. 2	1923/1945		For individual use	11.7	35.4
4157	Napier, Pa	1923	Station		12.9	36.5
4160	Manns Choice, Pa	1923	Passing Siding	No carload delivery	15.6	39.2
4160	Manns Choice, Pa	1923/1945	Station	Telephone Office	15.9	39.5
4160	Manns Choice, Pa	1923	John M. Egolf & H. F. W. Miller	For individual use	16.3	39.9
4160	Manns Choice, Pa	1923	Elk Tanning Co. No. 10	For individual use	16.3	39.9
4164	Sulphur Springs	1923	Station		18.1	41.7
4165	Buffalo Mills, Pa	1923/1945	Station	Telephone Office	21.1	44.7
4165	Buffalo Mills, Pa	1923/1945	Passing Siding	No carload delivery	21.3	44.9
4167	Bard, Pa	1923	Station		22.5	46.1
4169	Madley, Pa	1923	Station		24.8	48.4
4169	Madley, Pa	1945			24.8	48.4
4169A	Leap Ganister Rock Co.	1945		For individual use	25.2	48.8
4170	Fossilville Gravel Pit	1923		For individual use	26.4	50.1
HY	Hyndman, Pa	1945	Station	Telephone Office	31.0	54.6
HY	Hyndman, Pa	1945	Jct. B&O RR		31.2	54.8
HY	Hyndman, Pa	1945	Penna. Post & Lumber Co.	For individual use	31.2	54.8
	STATE		Block-Limit Station		37.1	60.7
4182	State Line, Pa			Telephone Office	38.4	62.0
4182	State Line, Pa	1945	Shops	Roundhouse https://digital.hagley.org/PRR_ME00596A	38.6	62.3
4182	State Line, Pa	1945	Shops	Turntable	38.6	62.3
4182	State Line, Pa	1945	Shops	Coaling	38.6	62.3
4182	State Line, Pa	1945	Shops	Water https://digital.hagley.org/PRR_ME00592A	38.6	62.3
4182	State Line, Pa	1945	Shops	Yard https://digital.hagley.org/PRR_ME00595A	38.6	62.3
4182	State Line, Pa	1945	Passing Siding	No carload delivery	38.6	62.3
4182	State Line, Pa	1945	Jct. Cumberland & Pennsylvania RR		38.7	62.3
CU	Cumberland, Md	1945	Jct. Western Maryland Railway		38.4	62.0
CU	Cumberland, Md	1945	Pennsylvania-Maryland State Line	No siding	38.6	62.3
CU	Cumberland, Md	1945	City Jct. B&O RR	Telephone Office	44.1	67.7
CU	Cumberland, Md	1945	Station	Telephone Office	45.0	68.6
CU	Cumberland, Md	1945	Ridgley Yard		46.0	69.6
