= Eckhart Branch Railroad =

Early short line railroad

Map

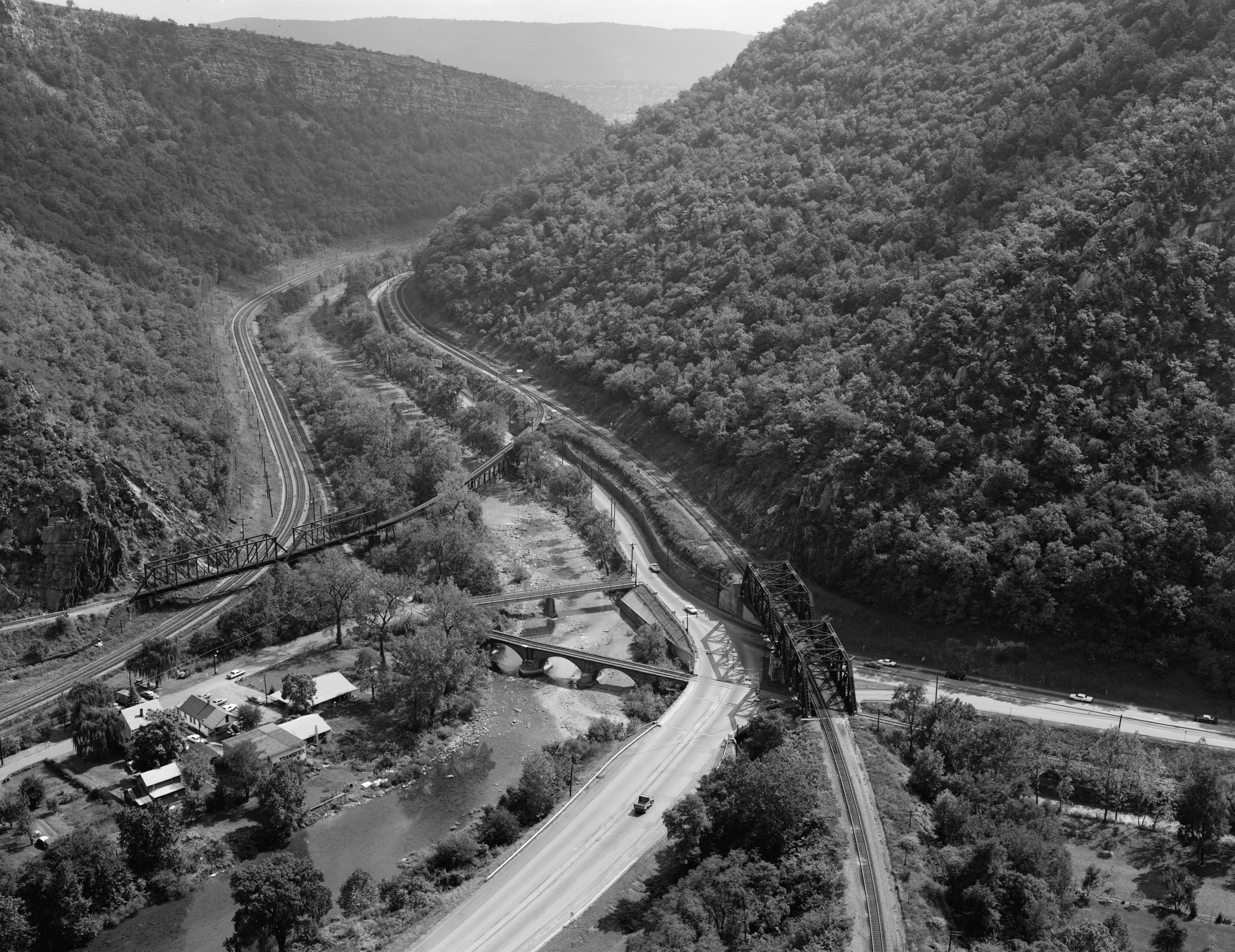
Eckhart Branch junction with the Baltimore and Ohio Railroad at Wills Creek. The brick arch viaduct was built in 1860.

The Eckhart Branch Railroad was a railroad that operated in the Cumberland, Maryland area in the 19th century.

The company was a subsidiary of the Maryland Mining Company of Eckhart Mines, Maryland. The railroad operated from 1846 to 1870, when it was absorbed into the Cumberland and Pennsylvania Railroad.

== Corporate ownership and construction history ==
The Maryland Mining Company (MMC) was incorporated in Maryland on March 12, 1829. The company built the railroad from Eckhart to Wills Creek, a length of 9 miles (14 km), along Braddock Run in 1846. It extended the line as the Potomac Wharf Branch between 1846 and 1850, totalling 14 miles (23 km). The railroad was acquired by the Cumberland and Pennsylvania Railroad (C&P) in 1870.

Wills Creek was bridged at the west end of the Cumberland Narrows with a four arch brick structure that stood until removed for flood control in 1998. The railway included two tunnels, the one closest to Cumberland (lower tunnel) being 506 feet (154 m) long, and the upper tunnel being 335 feet (102 m) long. The tunnels were separated by 0.6-mile (0.97 km). The grade (slope) reached 3 percent in places. This branch was also the location of a large horseshoe curve, at Clarysville, with 180 degrees of a 30-degree curvature. The construction of Interstate 68 from the Vocke Road intersection to the bridges at Clarysville removed most of the evidence of the Eckhart Branch railroad in that area, including the tunnels.

The MMC rail line connected with the Mount Savage Railroad at the west end of the Narrows. After passing through the Narrows on the north side, it recrossed Wills Creek on a bridge (no longer present) just east of the present U.S. Route 40 bridge. Some of the tracks were still visible as of 1999 near some billboards, and a gas station. A picture of a classic wreck scene, circa 1860, shows that bridge collapsed into Wills Creek, with the engine C.E. Detmold hanging on. The original Potomac Wharf Branch bridge was a 203-foot (62 m) deck plate girder structure, with two support pillars in the creek. It was built in 1849, and rebuilt after the Detmold accident. It survived until a flood in 1936, and was not replaced.

The Potomac Wharf Branch was used to carry coal to flat-bottom Potomac River boats, and to canal boats, before a canal wharf facility for the Chesapeake and Ohio Canal (C&O Canal) was completed. The flat-bottom boats ferried coal down the Potomac to Georgetown, Washington, D.C. and Alexandria, Virginia during the Spring, when the water level was high enough for navigation. After the C&O Canal reached Cumberland, canal boats could enter the Potomac River through the guard locks. The original Potomac River wharf had been built by John Galloway Lynn of Cumberland, and was known as the Lynn Wharf. It ran along what now is Avirett Avenue. It was deeded to the Maryland Mining Company in 1849.

The Cumberland Coal and Iron Company (CC&I), chartered in 1850, purchased the MMC mines and railroad property, including the village of Eckhart, in April 1852. The rail line was extended to the nearby Hoffman mines in 1859. Cumberland Coal & Iron was in turn acquired by the Consolidation Coal Company in 1870. At that point, the Eckhart Branch became part of the C&P Railroad, also owned by Consolidation Coal. However, for a period of 20 years, from 1850 to 1870, the Eckhart Branch Railroad operated independently of the C&P.

The Baltimore and Ohio Railroad (B&O) provided early motive power (locomotives) and rolling stock to the Allegany County coal short line railroads. The B&O supplied at least eight Camel engines to the MMC, as evidenced in notes by locomotive builder Ross Winans. These included B&O engines nos. 161, 162, and 163, among others. In addition, Winans, among other builders, sold engines, tenders, and coal hoppers to the various mining companies. Passenger service was provided on the Eckhart Branch sometime before 1853, and the C&P continued to use a gravity passenger car on that line. The passenger car was then hauled back up the mountain at the end of a string of empty coal hoppers. Servicing, watering, and coaling facilities were located in Eckhart. The C&P maintained an engine house and servicing facilities here, and the foundations of these were still evident in 1999.

== Line naming ==
The term "Eckhart Branch" seems to date from the later period of the 1870s. In a schedule published in the Frostburg Mining Journal, the line is referred to as the "Cumberland Branch." In the earliest accounts, the line is simply called the "Maryland Mining Company Railway." During the Civil War, the rail line was most probably used to transport supplies and patients to the Military Hospital facility at Clarysville. (ref. 100).

== Locomotive roster ==
It is not known if this is a complete list of Eckhart Branch locomotives. All of the listed engines except the first are of the "Camel" type. Hicks (ref. 23) recounts that the transfer records in the Maryland State Archives (from MMC to CC&I) mention five engines. Two of these are Winans, but lighter in weight than the listed engines, and three are much lighter. Rankin (ref. 46) mentions that the company motive power included three first class engines, two second class, and forty-one horses and mules. Rolling stock included sixty-eight iron hopper, gondola, scow, and passenger cars in 1853.

| Builder | Wheel Arrangement | Data | Name | Company | Disposition |
|---|---|---|---|---|---|
| unknown | 2-2-2 | ? | Enoch Pratt | MMC | unknown |
| Winans | 0-8-0 | 1849 | Eckhart | MMC | rebuilt in 1868, sold to C&P as #27 |
| Winans | 0-8-0 | 1849 | Mountaineer | MMC | sold to C&P as #28, scrapped in 1876 |
| Winans | 0-8-0 | 1851 | Fire King | MMC | unknown |
| Winans | 0-8-0 | 1852 | Black Monster | CC&I | sold to C&P as #29 |
| Winans | 0-8-0 | 1854 | Braddock | CC&I | sold to C&P as #31, later renumbered to #30 |
| Winans | 0-8-0 | 1853 | Cumberland | CC&I | sold to C&P as #30 |
Note: The "Black Monster" has the same specifications as B&O Nos. 106 and 108: 19" x 22" cylinders, 43" drivers.

No pictures of any of these engines are known to exist. The Transfer records mention "2 engines of 23 ton's weight, 1 second-class coal/wood burner of 15 tons, 1 English make, American built of 15 tons, and 1 second class engine of 12 tons." The use of the "Enoch Pratt" label is questionable, although it may be the "American built of 15 tons" mentioned. A 2-2-2 wheel arrangement is unusual. The Robert Stephenson Patentee locomotive of 1834 was of this pattern. American manufacturers known to have copied Stephenson's work from Britain include Baldwin Locomotive Works, Rogers Locomotive and Machine Works, the Locks & Canal Company of Lowell, Ma., and the West Point Foundry. No extant records support the sales of an engine from any of these companies to Eckhart. The West Point Foundry had supplied the machinery to the Georges Creek Coal and Iron Company or the blast furnace at Lonaconing.

The Eckhart was a "second class" engine, with 17-inch (430 mm) cylinders. The Braddock was a first class engine, with 19-inch (480 mm) cylinders. Winans customarily gave a thirty-day trial period to the purchasers. The engine Mountaineer was delivered on December 1, 1849, and accepted on Jan. 8, 1850. The engine Cumberland cost $11,000. and was delivered May 28, 1853. The engine Fire King, delivered 6/30/1851, came with a 4-wheel tender, holding 1½ tons of coal, and 900 gallons of water. The engine Frostburg went into service on Nov. 20, 1852.

== Operations ==
Service on the Eckhart Branch was hard, as evidenced by a series of correspondence with the Winans works in Baltimore in 1856. On June 16, 1856, CC&I ordered a replacement right-hand crosshead for the Braddock. The Braddock had gone into service on July 1, 1854. On September 24, they needed the same part for the Eckhart. The Eckhart had been placed into service on August 1, 1849. A frantic telegram on December 9, 1856, emphasizes the need for urgency for shipment of the replacement left-hand crosshead for the Eckhart. The engines Black Monster and Cumberland were at work at that time. The parts were delivered to the B&O Railroad at Cumberland. It is not known whether the repair work was done at Cumberland, or at Eckhart. The engine Eckhart was later rebuilt at the C&P shops in Mount Savage in 1868.

At the opening ceremony of the railroad on Wednesday, May 13, 1846, a special train took the board of directors and guests from Cumberland to Eckhart, and returned. About two weeks later, an accident occurred on the line near the junction with the Mount Savage Rail Road, at the west end of the Narrows. A dozen passengers were injured when the brakes burned out on the train, and it overturned due to excessive speed. It was noted in a contemporary newspaper account that these were the same brakes commonly used on the B&O line, but they were not adequate for the grades of the Eckhart Branch. Flooding in July 1846 also caused extensive damage to the line's lower end.

From 1846 to 1870, the Winans Camel engines of the Eckhart Railroad eased the heavy coal loads down the mountain, around the horseshoe curve, and through the tunnels to Cumberland. These were the days of manual car brakes, and link-and-pin couplers. Brakemen ran across the tops of cars, in all sorts of weather, to manually set and release the handbrakes. Later, the Camels would haul the empty coal hoppers and the lone passenger car back up the mountain in preparation for another day's work. The legacy of the Eckhart Branch railroad continued with the C&P, and with Western Maryland Railway equipment into the 1950s.

Before World War I, locomotive manufacturer Baldwin and the C&P management discussed the building of a small articulated engine to work the Eckhart Branch. The catalog Baldwin 2-4-4-2 was rated at 44,200 pounds of tractive effort, and grossed 188,000 pounds. It was rated for 475 trailing tons on a 3 percent grade. It used 51-inch (1,300 mm) wheels, and 200 psi boiler pressure. It was a Mallet design, with the high pressure rear cylinders rigidly attached to the frame, and the front low pressure cylinders pivoted, in the manner of a pilot. The high pressure cylinders were 19" x 26"; the low pressure ones were 29" x 26". Baldwin built at least two engines to this design for the Little River Railroad in Tennessee. The first was rejected, and eventually went into logging service on the West Coast.

C&P's Master Mechanic Sarby calculated he could get the same tractive effort by boring out the cylinders out on a C&P Class L 2-8-0. Engine number 23 was selected. Number 23 was a Mount Savage-built engine that entered service in October 1904. For some reason, Sarby was fired a short time later. The engine remained in service until scrapping in July 1944.

There are no details on the conversion, but if we assume that the cylinders were bored an additional 1", the tractive effort would have increased by about 10 percent. This is following Baldwin's published formula for tractive effort (ref. 78). Boring out the cylinders would have required new pistons, of course. The weight of the unit would not have changed significantly. The steam capacity of the boiler would have been sufficient for the low speed operations of the Eckhart Branch. One of the limitations of the Eckhart Branch, besides the tunnel clearances, curves, and grade was the load capacity of the Wills Creek Bridge, at the West End of the Narrows.

After the acquisition of the C&P by the Western Maryland Railway, the Eckhart Branch was worked by WM number 1102, a Baldwin Decapod (wheel arrangement 2-10-0). This class of engine was noted for its light axle loading, and had no flanges on the main drivers, for negotiating sharp curves.

Actual and Proposed Units on the Eckhart Branch
| Parameter | C&P Class L | Baldwin Articulated | No. 23, bored out 1" | WM Decapod | Camel (Winans) |
|---|---|---|---|---|---|
| Wheel Size (inches) | 50 | 51 | 50 | 52 | 43 |
| Steam Pressure (PSI) | 200 | 200 | 200 | 180 | 95 |
| Wheel Arrangement | 2-8-0 | 2-4-4-2 | 2-8-0 | 2-10-0 | 0-8-0 |
| Cylinders (inches) | 21x26 | 19x26 | 22x26 | 25x28 | 19x22 |
| Weight (lb) | 174,500 | 188,000 | 174,500 | 195,500 | 74,300 |
| Tractive Effort (lb) | 39,000 | 44,200 | 42,785 | 51,500 | 14,915 |

The figure of merit on the Eckhart Branch was the number of empty hoppers that could be pulled uphill. This figure depends on the rolling resistance of the car, the grade resistance, and the curve resistance. The Winans engine could handle 40 hoppers, based on a tare weight of 3 tons for the Winans-designed 6-wheel hoppers in use in 1854. The later engines would haul 55-ton capacity hoppers, of tare weight 20 tons. The capacity of a standard C&P class L engine would have been 21 cars. The articulated engine could have handled 24. The later Decapods pulled 28 cars.

== See also ==
- George's Creek and Cumberland Railroad (1876–1917)
- Georges Creek Valley
