= Hoffman tunnel =

Two-mile-long tunnel in Allegany County, Maryland, US

Coordinates: 39°38′17.6″N 78°53′32.65″W

- Interactive map of Hoffman tunnel

Overview
- Other name: Hoffman drainage tunnel
- Location: Clarysville

Operation
- Work began: 1903
- Opened: 1906

Technical
- Design engineer: Phillip Jenkins
- Length: 2 m (6 ft 7 in)
- Grade: 1/3 percent

The Hoffman tunnel, or Hoffman drainage tunnel, was constructed to drain water from coal mines northwest of Clarysville in Allegany County, Maryland. The two-mile-long tunnel drains into the Braddock Run tributary of Wills Creek.

== Tunnel construction ==
The Hoffman Drainage tunnel was an engineering triumph of its age. Built in the period 1903 through 1906, it was hand-driven through solid rock for two miles to provide an outlet for water that was flooding the coal mines. Since the water had proven to be too much for the steam pumps, coal production was stagnating. After an engineering survey of the tunnel project by the Consolidation Coal Company, a contract was let to Mr. Phillip Jenkins, Sr. of Wales. Work was begun from both ends in November 1903 by Jenkins' four sons, William, Edward, James, and Phillip, Jr.

The Jenkins crew were familiar with hard rock mining from their native Wales, but this work was different from coal mining. To speed progress, a shaft was sunk 181 feet deep inside Hoffman Mine number 3. From the bottom, the men dug in both directions, giving four working faces, including the exit portals.

The tunnel proceeds in a straight line, except for an 18 degree turn located some 400 feet from the east (exit) portal. The tunnel is a uniform 8 feet in height and width, and follows a downgrade of some 1/3 percent. This put the exit 40 feet lower than the drainage area in the mine, which was more than sufficient for adequate flow. The excavation work proceeded in three shifts per day, involving blasting through hard rock. Working conditions were described as "wretched" due to cold water seepage. The men worked in rubber waders. A pump was added near the exit at the horseshoe curve of the Eckhart Branch of the Cumberland and Pennsylvania Railroad (C&P), to help control the flow. The miners used lard oil lamps for illumination. Drilling for the blasts was done by hand, with a three-man crew. The excavated rock was removed through Hoffman number 3 mine, and dumped on the slate banks.

Later, a mule was lowered into the central shaft, and served there as a draft animal for six months. William Jenkins was in charge of the dynamite and his brother James supervised the digging. They stayed resided at the nearby Clarysville Inn while the work was under way. During the dig, there were only two accidents, and only one man died. The project cost $300,000.

The tunnel was punched through on Saturday, July 21, 1906 at 9 pm. It was found to be off by less than three inches. The Frostburg Mining Journal of September 15, 1906, proclaimed, "The Great Work Complete." Inside the mines, the pumps were silenced, and gravity took over to lower the water level. It is estimated that 9,000,000 gallons of water were drained in 24 hours.

== Mining operations ==
The impact on the coal workings was immediate. A tremendous amount of coal, previously inaccessible, was now available, and over 50 additional men were employed to work the coal. In addition, working conditions in the mines improved. Thirteen miles of mine drainage ditches fed the tunnel. Observers noted in the Cumberland News of 1906 that the volume of water carried by Braddock Run was ten times greater after the tunnel had been operating for two months. The draining water's red coloration and odor of sulfur was noted as far downstream as Wills Creek in the Narrows.

Maintenance continued until about 1953 and the mines closed around 1960. As of February 2000, the concrete portal arch at the east or drainage end was still standing. The overburden upstream for some 30 meters is gone, and some timbering can be seen in the stream bed. The water seems to emerge upward from the end of a blind canyon and flows through the arch. The inscription on the arch can still be clearly read: "1903-1906, Hoffman Drainage Tunnel, Length 2 miles."

== Aftermath ==
The east end of the tunnel with its associated concrete arch is located next to one of the bridge abutments that carried the C&P horseshoe curve over the creek at that point. Tunnels such as the Hoffman Drainage Tunnel have been a cause of acid mine drainage. The water flow in February 2000 was quite brisk, with obvious smell of sulfur, but with a decided red tinge to the water.

== See also ==
- Consolidation Coal Company
