= James A. Millholland =

American railroad executive

James Allaire Millholland (December 8, 1842 - December 6, 1911), the son of James Millholland, was an American railroad executive, serving as General Manager and later President of the Georges Creek and Cumberland Railroad in Cumberland, Maryland, USA, which served coal mines in the Georges Creek Valley.

Before then, he was associated with the Cumberland & Pennsylvania Railroad, responsible for setting up their shops in Mount Savage. He was lured away to the Georges Creek and Cumberland by a high salary, and a new Victorian home on Washington Street in Cumberland.

He was also a coin collector. Some of his collection was placed for auction more than a century after his death.

He had at least one child, Paul Douglass Millholland 2d, who in turn had at least one daughter, Jane Allaire Millholland.
