= Potomac Wharf Branch =

Historic railroad located in Maryland, US

Map

The Potomac Wharf Branch was a historic railroad located in Maryland. It was built by the Maryland Mining Company between 1846 and 1850, as an extension to the Eckhart Branch Railroad. The Potomac Wharf Branch crossed Wills Creek on a bridge (no longer present) just east of the present Route 40 road bridge near Cumberland. Rail tracks from this line may still be seen near some billboards, and a gas station in that area.

The area near the creek end of present-day Wills Creek Avenue is known as City Junction, and had a water tank and a tower. The Potomac Wharf Branch was crossed by the Georges Creek & Cumberland Railroad (GC&C). Rail was removed from the section west of the Valley Street crossing as late as 1990. In 1994, rail was removed from this area to maintain the Western Maryland Scenic Railroad, the former GC&C line to Frostburg.

The Potomac Wharf Branch Railroad was an early intermodal experiment to provide easy access for western Maryland coal to the markets of the eastern seaboard. Although its useful life was short, it provided a needed short-term outlet for the export of the region's "black gold."

== Ownership ==
The Maryland Mining Company sold its railroad property to the Cumberland Coal and Iron Company (CC&I) in 1852. CC&I was acquired by the Consolidation Coal Company in 1870. Consolidation Coal also owned the Cumberland and Pennsylvania Railroad (C&P). The C&P was acquired by the Western Maryland Railway (WM) in 1944.

== Bridge collapse ==
A classic wreck scene photo, circa 1860, shows the Wharf Branch bridge collapsed into Wills Creek, with the locomotive C. E. Detmold dangling into the creek. This image indicates the branch and the facility were in use at least to this date. The original Potomac Wharf Branch bridge was a 203-foot (62 m) deck plate girder structure, with two support pillars in the creek. Built in 1849, and rebuilt after the Detmold accident, it survived until the flood of 1936.

== Wharves ==
The Potomac Wharf Branch carried coal to flat-bottom Potomac River boats, and later to boats at the Chesapeake and Ohio Canal, before the canal's wharf facility was completed. There was a series of canal wharves built at Cumberland. The Mount Savage Railroad reportedly built one in 1850. The 1923 Interstate Commerce Commission valuation docket for the C&P Railroad gives the construction date for the concrete wharf as 1917. The Baltimore and Ohio Railroad (B&O) provided access for the C&P to reach the canal wharf, charging a tonnage tariff for this access. The later wharves were built south of the Western Maryland Railway station, along the canal basin.

Initially, canal boats could enter the Potomac River through the guard locks, and proceed upriver for some distance. The dam in the Potomac below the guard locks ensured that the Potomac was deeper at its junction with Wills Creek than it is today. The guard locks and the dam were removed as part of the Wills Creek flood control project, built by the Army Corps of Engineers for Cumberland in the 1950s.

== Route ==
The length of the Potomac Wharf branch was about 0.9 miles (1.4 km). The river terminus was the position where the present Interstate 68 bridge passes over the B&O "West End" line. From City Junction, where the Wharf Branch crossed Wills Creek, the line proceeded eastward to meet the B&O tracks at the southern end of the B&O viaduct. The Potomac Wharf Branch was built on more of an upward slope than the GC&C, to meet the B&O tracks at viaduct level. It crossed Valley Street, and the south end of today's road bridge, at street level. The B&O roadbed is about 20 feet (6.1 m) higher than the Western Maryland Scenic Railroad line. East of Valley Street, some track and ties were still in place as late as 1994. Looking back from the B&O line, the junction of the Wharf Branch is easily seen.

== Cumberland viaduct ==
B&O's Cumberland viaduct was built as a brick arch structure during the period 1849 to 1851. The Wharf Branch line and the B&O main passed through the "Deep Cut." The cut (passage) provides the "West End" of the B&O with access to the Potomac River Valley, towards Keyser, and Grafton. The viaduct passes over city streets, Wills Creek, and the WM tracks (ex-GC&C, now used by the Western Maryland Scenic Railroad). The viaduct is double-tracked, as is the "Deep Cut." The southern end of the cut is wide enough for triple track, and the bridges are designed for three tracks. They currently carry two CSX West End tracks. The C&P line merged into the B&O westernmost tracks, then crossed over to the easternmost track.

The wharf siding was about 1,000 feet (300 m) long, extending from the current Kelly Boulevard around to Wills Creek. The details of the facility and the method for loading coal from the rail cars to the canal boats are not known. However, it was probably not as convenient as dumping directly into the boats, as was done with the later Canal Wharf facility. The Potomac Wharf Branch was listed on the C&P valuation sheets in 1918, although it is doubtful it was in use for transporting coal at that time.

== Businesses served ==
Some rail and ties remained between the viaduct and the Valley Street Bridge in 1994, and extend as far west as City Junction. That section of the line east of Valley Street is built on a raised section of land, with a reinforced retaining wall. The connection has been removed from the B&O line, but the location is still visible. The line was used into the 1940s as an industrial siding for the Cumberland Contracting Company, and the City of Cumberland's warehouse at Valley Street.

Before crossing Wills Creek to City Junction, a spur of the Wharf Branch serviced the Wellington Glass Plant. The plant had been acquired from the National Glass Company in 1909, and the buildings burned in that year.

== See also ==
- History of Cumberland, Maryland
- List of defunct Maryland railroads
