= John Lynn =

John Lynn may refer to:

- John Lynn (VC) (1887–1915), English recipient of the Victoria Cross
- John A. Lynn (born 1943), military historian
- John P. Lynn, businessman
- Johnnie Lynn (born 1956), American football player
- John Lynn (painter), British painter of the 19th century
- John Galloway Lynn (1803–1883), American businessman

== See also ==
- John Linn (disambiguation)
