= Maryland Route 743 =

Highway in Maryland

Maryland Route 743
- Old National Pike
- Maryland Route 743 highlighted in red

Route information
- Maintained by MDSHA
- Length: 1.00 mi (1.61 km)
- Existed: 1950–present

Major junctions
- West end: MD 36 in Frostburg
- MD 638 in Eckhart Mines
- East end: US 40 Alt. in Eckhart Mines

Location
- Country: United States
- State: Maryland
- Counties: Allegany

Highway system
- Maryland highway system; Interstate; US; State; Scenic Byways
← MD 742	→ MD 746

Maryland Route 743 (MD 743) is a state highway in the U.S. state of Maryland. The state highway runs 1.00 mile (1.61 km) from MD 36 in Frostburg east to U.S. Route 40 Alternate (US 40 Alternate) in Eckhart Mines. MD 743 is the original alignment of US 40 through Eckhart Mines. The state highway was designated when US 40 bypassed Eckhart Mines around 1950.

== Route description ==
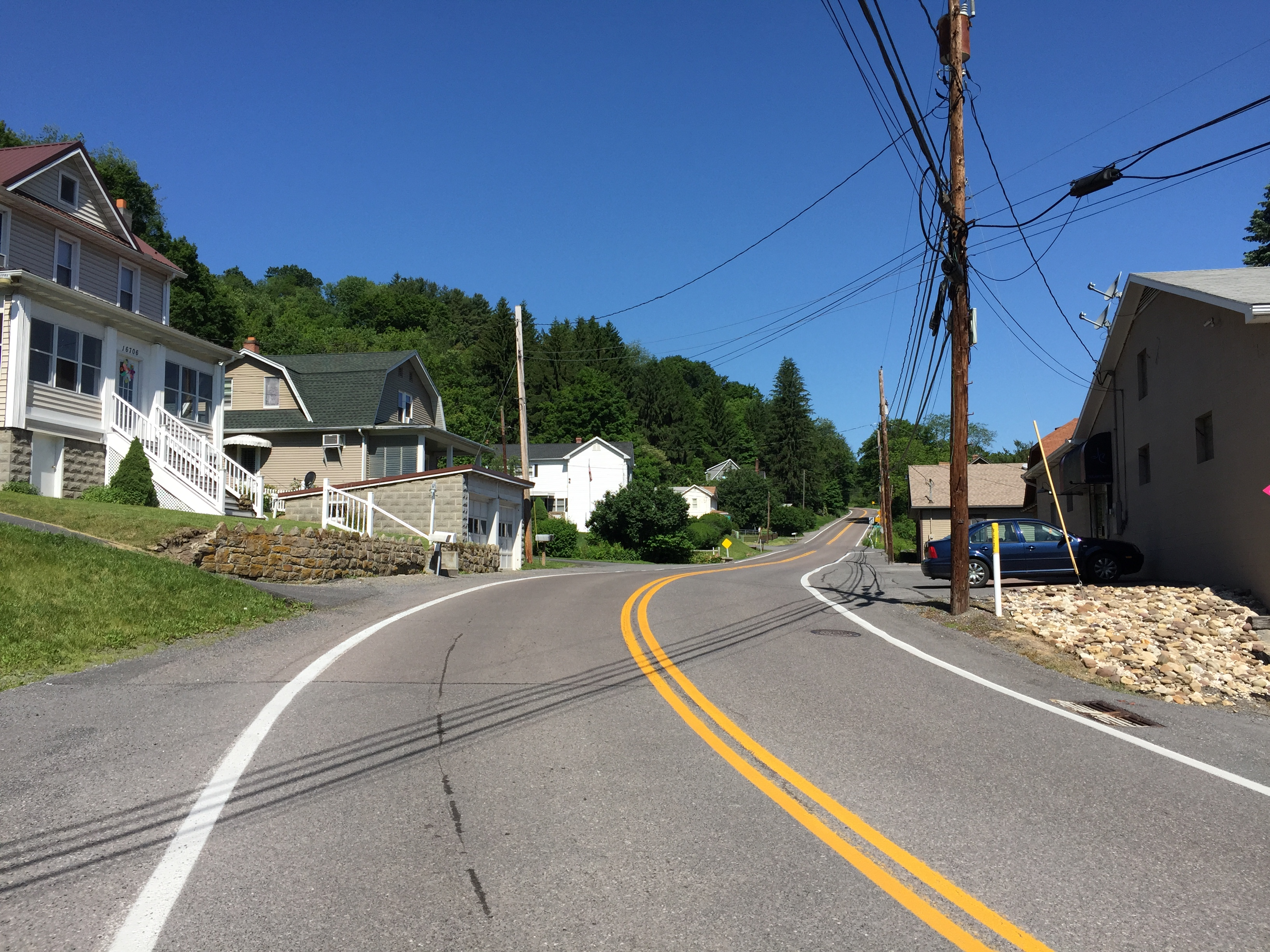
View west at the east end of MD 743 at US 40 Alt. in Eckhart Mines

MD 743 begins at an intersection with MD 36 (New Georges Creek Road) in Frostburg just south of MD 36's southern intersection with US 40 Alternate. The state highway heads east into the unincorporated village of Eckhart Mines as a winding two-lane undivided road. After intersecting MD 638 (Parkersburg Road) at an acute angle, MD 743 reaches its eastern terminus at US 40 Alternate (National Pike).

== History ==
MD 743 is the original alignment of US 40 and, before that, the National Road through Eckhart Mines. The highway was one of the original state roads scheduled for improvement by the Maryland State Roads Commission in 1909. The state road was paved through the village in 1911. MD 743 was designated through Eckhart Mines shortly after the US 40 (now US 40 Alternate) bypass of the village was completed in 1950. MD 743 originally extended west to US 40, meeting the highway on a tangent in front of Beall High School at the city limit of Frostburg. The western end of the state highway was truncated when MD 36 was moved to its present alignment between Midland and Frostburg in 1972.

== Junction list ==
The entire route is in Allegany County.

Location	mi	km	Destinations	Notes
Frostburg	0.00	0.00	MD 36 (New Georges Creek Road) – Westernport	Western terminus
Eckhart Mines	0.90	1.45	MD 638 north (Parkersburg Road) – Mount Savage	Southern terminus of MD 638
Eckhart Mines	1.00	1.61	US 40 Alt. (National Pike) – Frostburg, Cumberland	Eastern terminus
1.000 mi = 1.609 km; 1.000 km = 0.621 mi
