= Sloop-of-war =

Type of warship

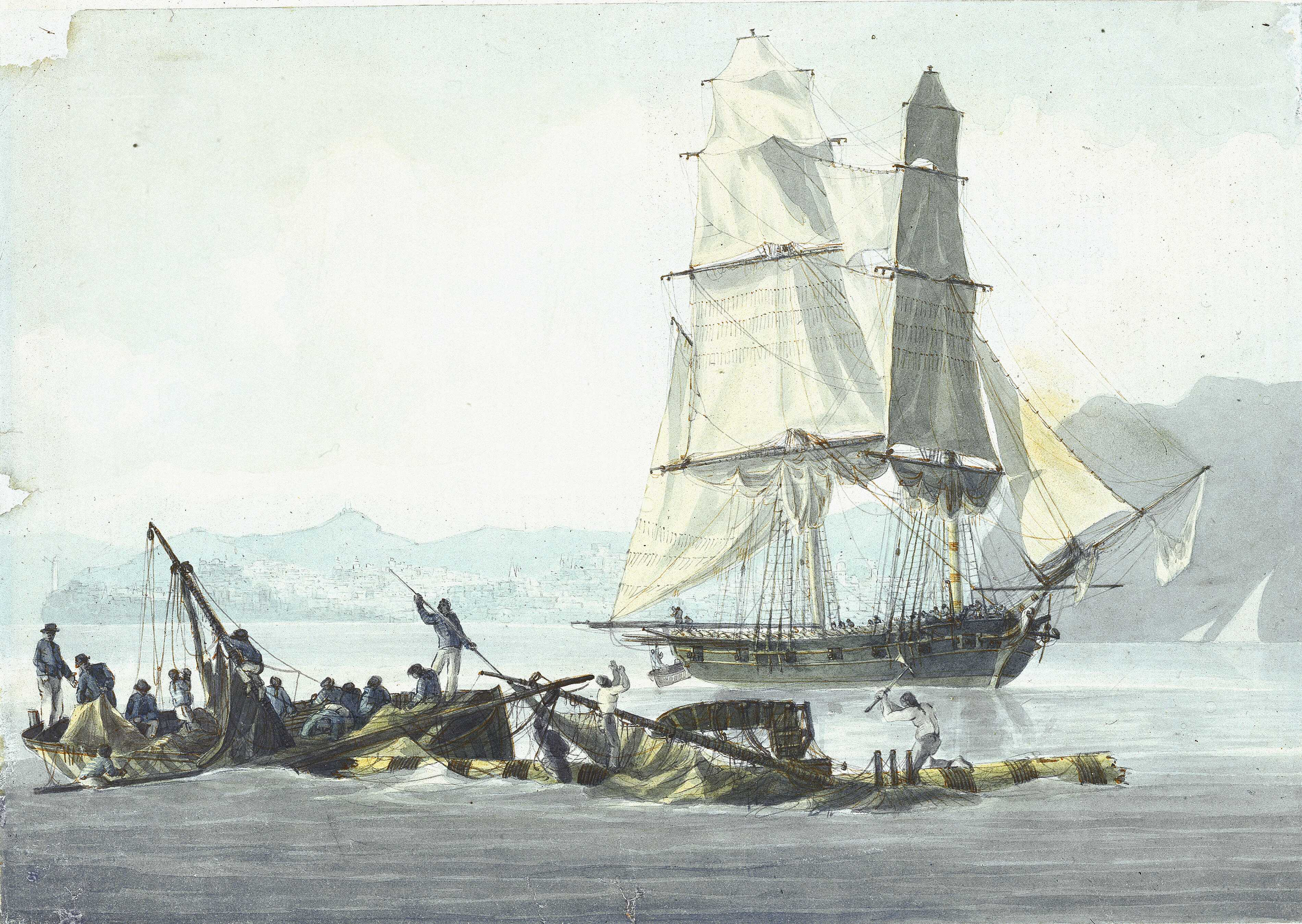
1800 illustration of the Royal Navy brig-sloop HMS Speedy

During the 18th and 19th centuries, a sloop-of-war was a warship of the Royal Navy with a single gun deck that carried up to 18 guns. The rating system of the Royal Navy covered all vessels with 20 or more guns; thus, the term encompassed all unrated warships, including gun-brigs and cutters. In technical terms, even the more specialised bomb vessels and fire ships were classed by the Royal Navy as sloops-of-war, and in practice these were employed in the role of a sloop-of-war when not carrying out their specialised functions.

In World War I and World War II, the Royal Navy reused the term "sloop" for specialised convoy-defence vessels, including the Flower class of the First World War and the highly successful Black Swan class of the Second World War, with anti-aircraft and anti-submarine capabilities. They performed similar duties to the destroyer escorts of the United States Navy, and also performed similar duties to the smaller corvettes of the Royal Navy.

== Rigging ==
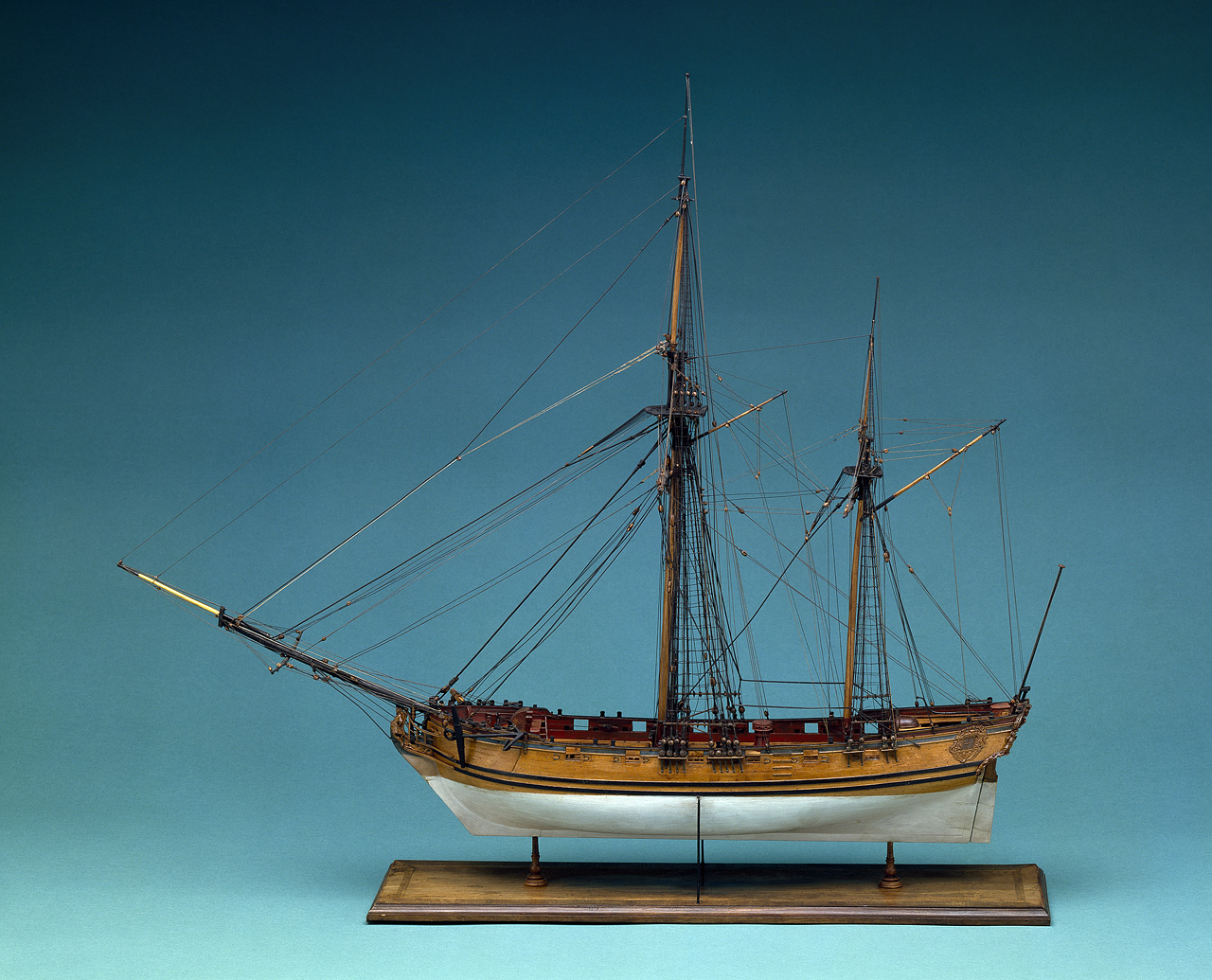
c. 1752 model of a 12-gun Royal Navy sloop

A sloop-of-war was quite different from a civilian or mercantile sloop, which was a general term for a single-masted vessel rigged in a way that would today be called a gaff cutter (but usually without the square topsails then carried by cutter-rigged vessels), though some sloops of that type did serve in the 18th century British Royal Navy, particularly on the Great Lakes of North America.

In the first half of the 18th century, most naval sloops were two-masted vessels, usually carrying a ketch or a snow rig. A ketch had main and mizzen masts but no foremast. A snow had a foremast and a main mast immediately abaft which a small subsidiary mast was fastened on which the spanker was set.

=== Ship-sloop ===
The first three-masted, i.e., "ship rigged", sloops appeared during the 1740s, and from the mid-1750s most new sloops were built with a three-masted (ship) rig. The third mast afforded the sloop greater mobility and the ability to back sail.

=== Brig-sloop ===
In the 1770s, the two-masted sloop re-appeared in a new guise as the brig sloop, the successor to the former snow sloops. Brig sloops had two masts, while ship sloops continued to have three (since a brig is a two-masted, square-rigged vessel, and a ship is a square-rigger with three or more masts, though never more than three in that period).

In the Napoleonic period, Britain built huge numbers of brig sloops of the Cruizer class (18 guns) and the Cherokee class (10 guns). The brig rig was economical of manpower – important given Britain's chronic shortfall in trained seamen relative to the demands of the wartime fleet. When armed with carronades (32-pounders in the Cruizer class, 18-pounders in the Cherokee class), they had the highest ratio of firepower to tonnage of any ships in the Royal Navy, albeit within the short range of the carronade. The carronades also used much less manpower than the long guns normally used to arm frigates. Consequently, the Cruizer class were often used as cheaper and more economical substitutes for frigates, in situations where the frigates' high cruising endurance was not essential. A carronade-armed brig, however, would be at the mercy of a frigate armed with long guns, so long as the frigate maneuvered to exploit its superiority of range. The other limitation of brig sloops as opposed to post ships and frigates was their relatively restricted stowage for water and provisions, which made them less suitable for long-range cruising. However, their shallower draught made them excellent raiders against coastal shipping and shore installations.

=== Bermuda sloop ===
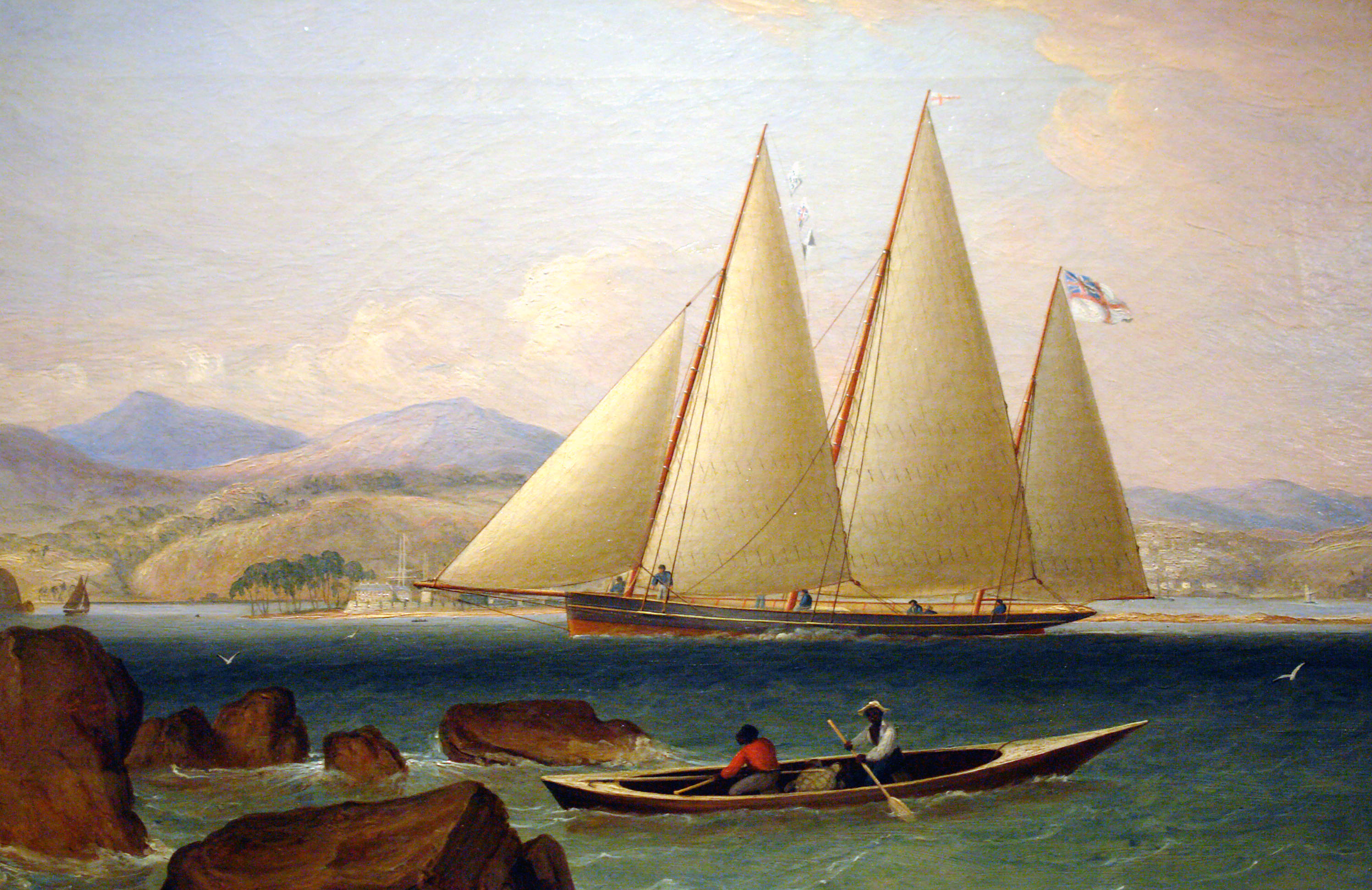
1831 painting of a Royal Navy Bermuda sloop entering a port in the West Indies by John Lynn

The Royal Navy also made extensive use of the Bermuda sloop, both as a cruiser against French privateers, slave ships and smugglers, and also as dispatch boats, carrying communications, vital persons and materials, and performing reconnaissance duties for British fleets. Bermuda sloops were found with gaff rig, mixtures of gaff and square rig, or a Bermuda rig. They were built with up to three masts. The single masted ships had huge sails and harnessed tremendous wind energy, which made them demanding to sail and required large, experienced crews. The Royal Navy favoured multi-masted versions, as it was perennially short of sailors at the end of the 18th century, and its personnel received insufficient training (particularly in the Western Atlantic, priority being given to the continuing wars with France for control of Europe). The longer decks of the multi-masted vessels also had the advantage of allowing more guns to be carried.

== Classification ==
Originally a sloop-of-war was smaller than a sailing frigate and was (by virtue of having too few guns) outside the rating system. In general, a sloop-of-war would be under the command of a master and commander rather than a post captain, although in day-to-day use at sea the commanding officer of any naval vessels would be addressed as "captain".

A ship sloop was generally the equivalent of the smaller corvette of the French Navy (although the French term also covered ships up to 24 guns, which were classed as post ships within the sixth rate of the British Navy). The name corvette was subsequently also applied to British vessels, but not until the 1830s.

American usage, while similar to British terminology into the beginning of the 19th century, gradually diverged. By about 1825 the United States Navy used "sloop-of-war" to designate a flush-deck ship-rigged warship with all armament on the gun deck; these could be rated as high as 26 guns and thus overlapped "third-class frigates," the equivalent of British post-ships. The Americans also occasionally used the French term corvette.

== History ==
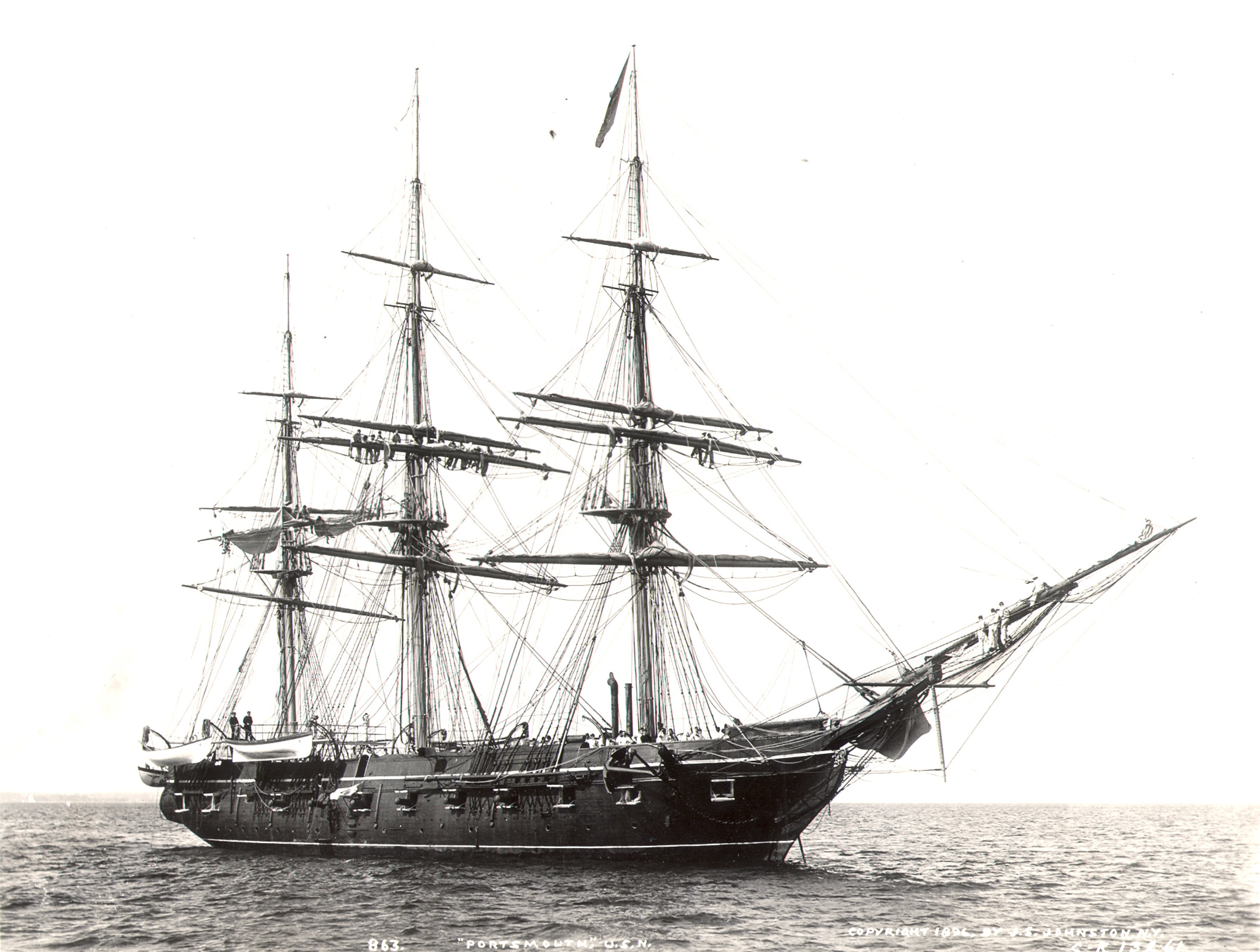
USS Portsmouth in 1896.

In the Royal Navy, the term "sloop of war" came into use in the early 18th century. However, small warships of roles later covered by the sloop of war were in use from the mid 17th century onwards. Many of these early ships were simply called "sloop", a term which did not yet refer to the sailing rig. Brigantine (which also did not refer to a rig yet) was another common type, originally intended to tow larger ships from danger, but quickly seeing use as patrol ships. These early military sloops can be thought of as the immediate predecessors to the sloop of war. They often found themselves working outside their intended role, highlighting the need for a small, versatile, unrated warship: this becomes the sloop of war in the 18th century.

=== Eighteenth and Early Nineteenth Centuries ===
At the start of the 18th century, the sloop of war was a small, unrated vessel with two masts, rigged usually as a ketch or snow. Schooner and brigantine rigged vessels also saw some use, and, very rarely, so did single masted sloops similar to the mercantile design.

Over the 18th century, the sloop evolved into a vessel with a single gun deck and three masts, two square rigged and the aft-most fore-and-aft rigged (corvettes had three masts, all of which were square-rigged). Steam sloops had a transverse division of their lateral coal bunkers in order that the lower division could be emptied first, to maintain a level of protection afforded by the coal in the upper bunker division along the waterline.

During the War of 1812 sloops of war in the service of the United States Navy performed well against their Royal Navy equivalents. The American ships had the advantage of being ship-rigged rather than brig-rigged, a distinction that increased their manoeuvrability. They were also larger and better armed. Cruizer-class brig-sloops in particular were vulnerable in one-on-one engagements with American sloops-of-war.

=== Decline ===
In the second half of the 19th century, successive generations of naval guns became larger and with the advent of steam-powered sloops, both paddle and screw, by the 1880s even the most powerful warships had fewer than a dozen large calibre guns, and were therefore technically sloops. Since the rating system was no longer a reliable indicator of a ship's combat power, it was abolished altogether and with it the classifications of sloops, corvettes and frigates. Instead a classification based on the intended role of the ship became common, such as cruiser and battleship.

=== Revival ===
During the First World War, the sloop rating was revived by the British Royal Navy for small warships not intended for fleet deployments. Examples include the Flower classes of "convoy sloops", those designed for convoy escort, and the Hunt class of "minesweeping sloops", those intended for minesweeping duty.

The Royal Navy continued to build vessels rated as sloops during the interwar years. These sloops were small warships intended for colonial "gunboat diplomacy" deployments, surveying duties, and acting during wartime as convoy escorts. As they were not intended to deploy with the fleet, sloops had a maximum speed of less than 20 knots (37 km/h). A number of such sloops, for example the Grimsby and Kingfisher classes, were built in the interwar years. Fleet minesweepers such as the Algerine class were rated as "minesweeping sloops". The Royal Navy officially dropped the term "sloop" in 1937, although the term remained in widespread and general use.

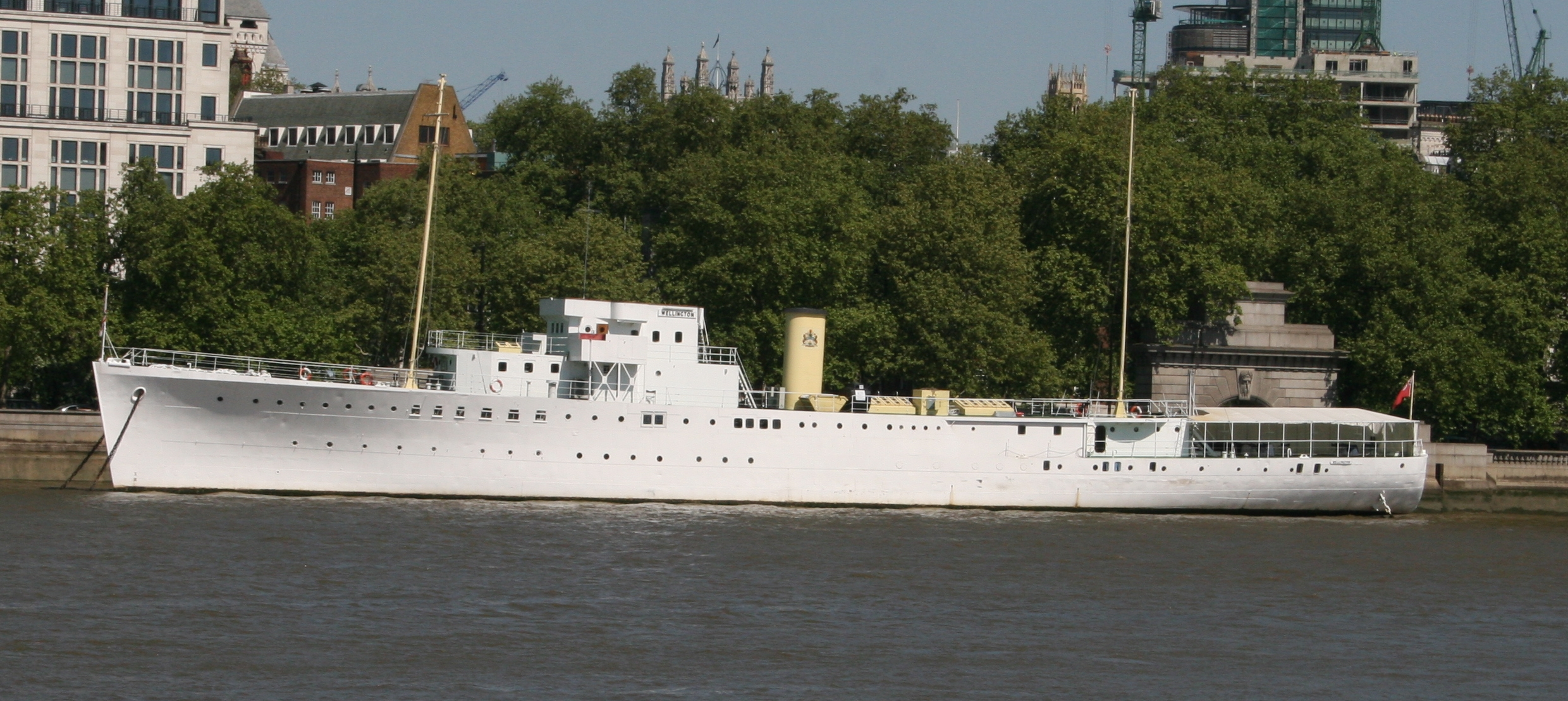
The Grimsby-class HMS Wellington. Launched in 1934, the vessel is now berthed on the Thames

=== World War II ===
During World War II, 37 ships of the Black Swan class were built for convoy escort duties. However, the warship-standards construction, propulsion and sophisticated armaments of the sloop of that time shared bottlenecks with destroyers and did not lend themselves to mass production on commercial shipyards, thus the sloop was supplanted by the corvette, and later the frigate, as the primary escort vessel of the Royal Navy. Built to mercantile standards and with (initially) simple armaments, these vessels, notably the Flower and River classes, were produced in large numbers for the Battle of the Atlantic. In 1948 the Royal Navy reclassified its remaining sloops and corvettes as frigates, even though the term sloop had been officially defunct for nine years.

=== Uncrewed Systems ===
In the 2010s, the Royal Navy proposed a concept, known as the "Future Black Swan-class Sloop-of-war", as an alternative to the Global Corvette of the Global Combat Ship programme. The project did not, however, advance.

The British Government's 2026 Defence Investment Plan (DIP) proposes the introduction of a series of autonomous vessels for the Royal Navy including the Type 92 "Uncrewed sense platform". The USV was envisaged as functioning as a Sloop "to hunt enemy submarines across the North Atlantic, supporting our new frigates". The numbers of vessels, and the timing of their introduction into service, had yet to be announced.

== Notable sloops ==
- Perhaps the most famous sloop was HMS Resolution, in which Captain James Cook made his second and third Pacific voyages. This was not a purpose-built naval sloop, but was a former merchant collier purchased by the Royal Navy and adapted for exploration purposes. Cook called Resolution "the ship of my choice", and "the fittest for service of any I have seen".
- USS Independence, a sloop of the Continental Navy which served on diplomatic missions to France. Independence was the first ship acquired by the Continental Congress for use during the American Revolutionary War. She captured two British prizes during her cruises to Europe.
- In 1780, HMS Vulture, a Swan-class sloop bearing 16 six-pounders and a crew of 99 seamen delivered Major John Andre to his meeting with General Benedict Arnold, near Haverstraw, New York, to finalise plans for Arnold's surrender of West Point to the British. After Andre's capture and the unmasking of the plot, Arnold fled to British lines, borne down the Hudson River aboard Vulture.
- HMS Beagle, a Cherokee-class brig-sloop re-rigged as a three-masted barque, is famous as the ship Charles Darwin sailed around the world in between 1831 and 1836.
- In 1804 Commodore Sir Samuel Hood, commissioned Diamond Rock, a small island south of Fort-de-France in Martinique, as HM Sloop-of-War Fort Diamond, following his establishment of a fortified garrison on the rock.

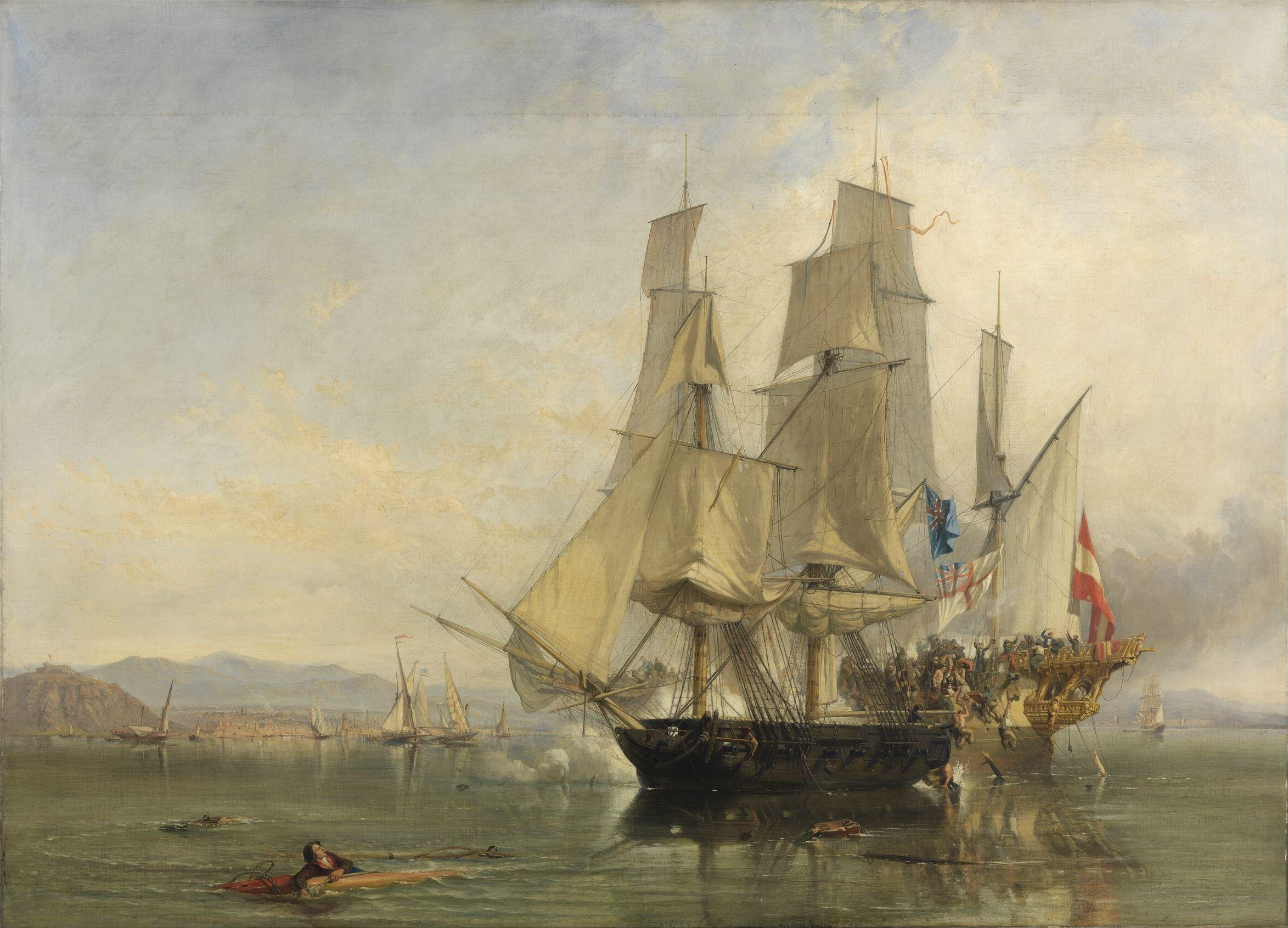
HMS Speedy captures a Spanish warship in 1801.

- In 1805, HMS Pickle (a Bermuda sloop) brought back news of the British victory at the Battle of Trafalgar.
- In 1800 and 1801 Lord Cochrane commanded HMS Speedy, a brig-sloop of 14 guns, through a series of famous exploits in the Mediterranean. Speedy served as the inspiration for the fictional Jack Aubrey's first command, Sophie.
- USS Eagle, a United States Navy sloop-of-war which was captured by the British in Canadian waters. Later she was liberated by the U.S. Navy at the Battle of Lake Champlain.

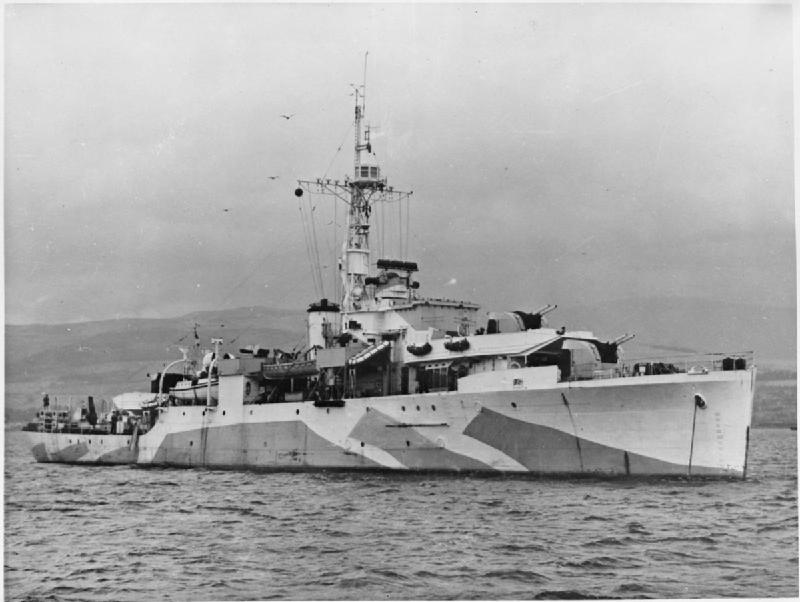
HMS Amethyst, a British Black Swan-class sloop became famous in the "Yangtse Incident" in 1949.

- In 1813, HMS Racoon was dispatched to Fort Astoria at the mouth of the Columbia River during the War of 1812 to seize the post, which as it turned out had already been sold to the North-West Company; the fort was renamed by the ship's Captain Black as Fort George.
- USS Wasp, a U.S. Navy sloop which served with distinction during the War of 1812. She is responsible for sinking or capturing at least four British warships and capturing several other merchant vessels. This within months of her commissioning and before her own sinking during a Caribbean storm in October 1814.
- In 1826, Karteria, acting as a warship of the Navy of the 1st Hellenic Republic under the command of Capt Frank Abney Hastings, was the first steam warship to see action. At the time the European armadas had no steam-warships.
- USS Portsmouth, a U.S. Navy sloop-of-war which served during the Mexican–American War in the California Campaign. She participated in combat during the Second Opium War, specifically the Battle of the Pearl River Forts. Later she served in the American Civil War, at the Battle of Forts Jackson and St. Philip.
- In 1843, Austin, flagship of Commodore Edwin Moore, and vessel of the Second Texas Navy, and was a participant in the naval Battle of Campeche, which is the only historical example of a sail navy having defeated a steam navy.
- USS Constellation, an 1854 sloop which is currently a museum ship. It was the last all-sail warship designed and built by the U.S. Navy.
- USS Kearsarge, an 1861 steam sloop-of-war best known for defeating the Confederate commerce raider CSS Alabama in a duel off the coast of Cherbourg, France in June 1864.
- HMS Egret, a 1938 sloop which was the first ship ever to be sunk by a guided missile, an event which occurred on 27 August 1943, when it was hit by a Henschel Hs 293 glide bomb launched from a Dornier Do 217.
- On 4 March 1942 HMAS Yarra sunk with the loss of 147 of 160 hands, while defending three ships under her protection from three Japanese cruisers and four destroyers. The actions of her crew are considered some of the bravest in the history of the Royal Australian Navy.
- HMS Starling, commanded by Captain Frederic John Walker, participated in the sinking of 14 U-boats between 1943 and 1944 as part of the 2nd Escort Group.
- In 1949, HMS Amethyst, a Black Swan-class sloop of the Royal Navy became involved in an international incident when she became trapped in the Yangtze River by Communist Chinese shore batteries. She made a famous escape on 30 July 1949, later turned into a feature film Yangtse Incident: The Story of HMS Amethyst.

== See also ==
- List of corvette and sloop classes of the Royal Navy
- List of sloops of war of the United States Navy
- Cruizer-class brig-sloop
- Rating system of the Royal Navy
- List of frigates of the Second World War
