= Maryland Route 638 =

State highway in Maryland, United States

Maryland Route 638
- Parkersburg Road
- Maryland Route 638 highlighted in red

Route information
- Maintained by MDSHA
- Length: 2.34 mi (3.77 km)
- Existed: 1938–present

Major junctions
- South end: MD 743 in Eckhart Mines
- US 40 Alt. in Eckhart Mines
- North end: MD 36 near Mount Savage

Location
- Country: United States
- State: Maryland
- Counties: Allegany

Highway system
- Maryland highway system; Interstate; US; State; Scenic Byways
← MD 637	→ MD 639

Maryland Route 638 (MD 638) is a state highway in the U.S. state of Maryland. Known as Parkersburg Road, the state highway runs 2.34 miles (3.77 km) from MD 743 in Eckhart Mines north to MD 36 near Mount Savage in northwestern Allegany County. MD 638 was constructed in the late 1930s.

== Route description ==
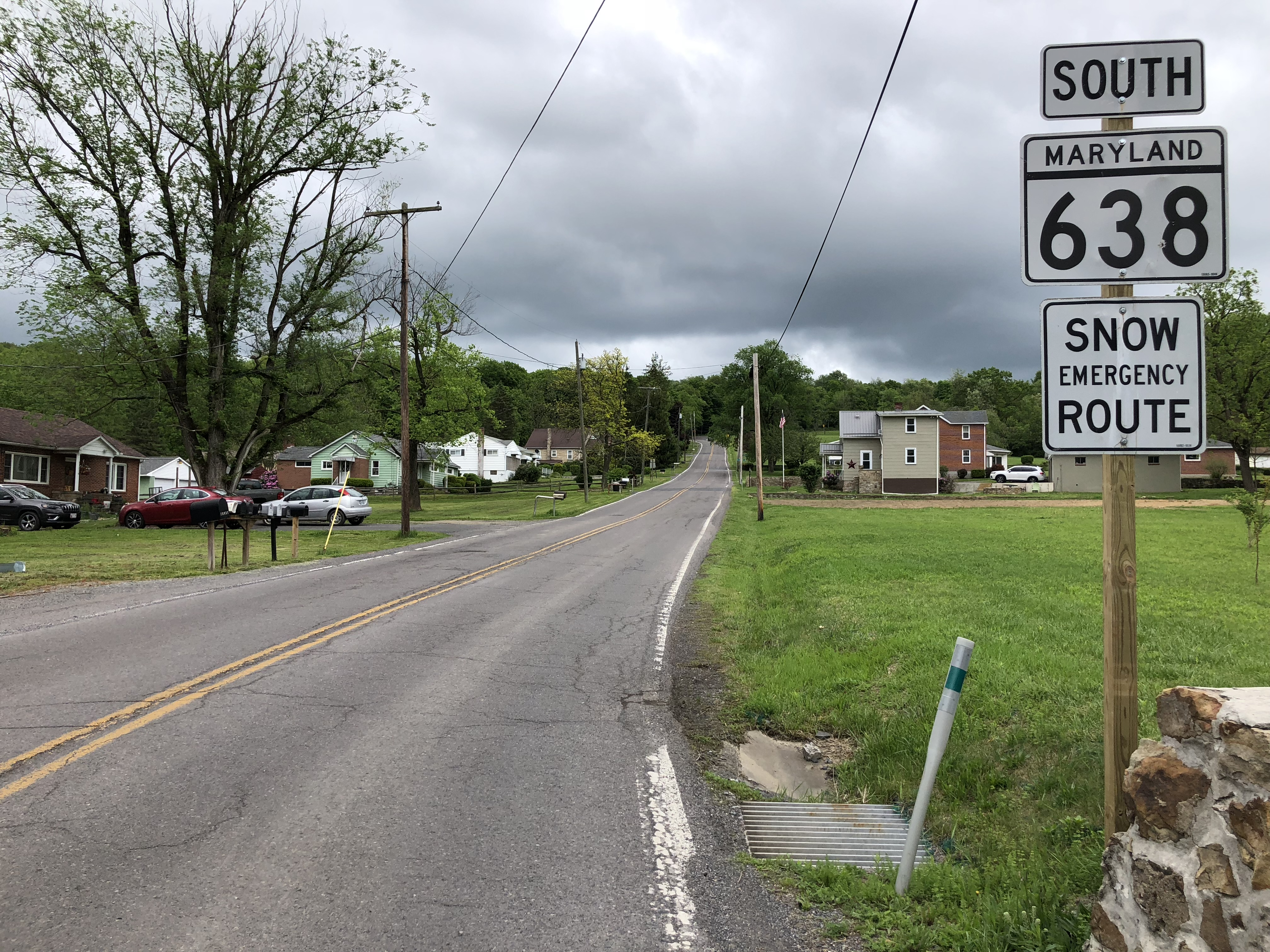
View south from the north end of MD 638 at MD 36 near Mount Savage

MD 638 begins at an oblique intersection with unsigned MD 743 (Old National Pike) in Eckhart Mines. The state highway crosses Porter Run on a narrow bridge before meeting U.S. Route 40 Alternate (National Pike). MD 638 continues north as a two-lane undivided road and ascends the side of Federal Hill. At Porter Cemetery Hill, the state highway turns northwest and descends into the valley of Jennings Run. MD 638 passes through two sharp S-curves on either side of a 15-foot-wide (4.6 m) bridge over the Western Maryland Scenic Railroad. The state highway reaches its northern terminus at MD 36 (Mount Savage Road) between Mount Savage and Zihlman near the hamlets of Morantown and Slabtown.

== History ==
MD 638 was constructed in its modern form in 1938.

== Junction list ==
The entire route is in Allegany County.

Location	mi	km	Destinations	Notes
Eckhart Mines	0.00	0.00	MD 743 (Old National Pike)	Southern terminus; MD 743 is unsigned
Eckhart Mines	0.21	0.34	US 40 Alt. (National Pike) – Frostburg, Cumberland	
	2.34	3.77	MD 36 (Mount Savage Road) – Frostburg, Mount Savage	Northern terminus
1.000 mi = 1.609 km; 1.000 km = 0.621 mi
