= Georges Creek Coal and Iron Company =

Company that operated in Maryland, US from 1835 to 1863

The Georges Creek Coal and Iron Company is a defunct coal mining, iron producer and railroad company that operated in Maryland from 1835 to 1863.

== Iron furnace ==
The company was formed in 1835, and chartered in the state of Maryland on March 29, 1836. The president was John Henry Alexander, who also happened to be the Maryland State Engineer.

Between 1837 and 1839, the company built an iron furnace in Lonaconing, Maryland. The furnace, fueled by coke, went into blast in 1839. There was plenty of iron ore, limestone, water, and coal locally, but the major problem the company faced was transporting finished products to market. Production reached 75 tons per week, and local iron needs were quickly satisfied. Some products were shipped out by wagon, including such items as dowels for the walls of the Chesapeake and Ohio Canal (C&O). The adjacent casting house made farming implements, mine car wheels and track, and household utensils. The furnace output was mostly in the form of pig iron, which was sold to be recast, or worked.

Ore for the furnace came from mines on the hill behind the furnace. Tram roads were used to transport the ore to the furnace. Later, the mine tunnels were used as storage cellars by residents on the hill. Ore was also mined on the opposite hillside, above the (later) silk factory, and the area around Buck Hill. Ore also came from Koontz (now called Midland, Maryland). The Tilley Field was on Hugh Weir's property, on the east side of a fork of Laurel Run. Another tunnel was located on the Philip Hansel land, just south of Tilley Field. It was reported to be 6 feet (1.8 m) high, and a 100 feet (30 m) long. From 1848 through 1858, ore came from the area around Pompey Smash (Vale Summit), on the south side of Dan's Rock Road.

One key ingredient of a blast furnace is the blast. The company bought the necessary machinery from the West Point Foundry in New York City. The machinery went by ship from New York to Georgetown, then by canal to Williamsport. Here, the parts were loaded on wagons for the final leg of the journey. The canal charged $3.50 per ton to transport the twenty tons of machinery parts. Only the boilers made it to Lonaconing before the canal froze in the winter of 1837. Ten additional wagon loads from Williamsport arrived at the site in November.

The blast machinery featured a 60 horsepower (45 kW) steam engine fed by five boilers. The steam cylinders were 18 inches (460 mm) in diameter, and 8 feet (2.4 m) long. The system operated at 50 psi. The steam cylinder drove a blast cylinder 5 feet (1.5 m) in diameter, and 8 feet (2.4 m) long. This forced about 3,500 cubic feet (99 m^{3}) per minute of air at 2.5 psi through the system. A very large iron regulator smoothed the air flow from the reciprocating cylinder. The air flowed through a series of pipes in the boiler furnaces and was heated to 700 °F (371 °C). The heated air then entered the blast furnace through two big water-cooled nozzles called tuyeres. When the water supply failed, the furnace had to be operated with a less efficient cold blast. The first run of good iron came from the furnace on May 17, 1839. By May 23, the furnace was producing six tons per day. Seven tons of coal were required to produce one ton of the cast metal.

The furnace complex was visited by Caspar Wever, Superintendent of Construction for the Baltimore and Ohio Railroad (B&O), in June 1839. Shortly afterwards, the shareholders of the C&O Canal visited. With the furnace up and operating, the facility expansion plans included a forge and rolling mill. However, these were never built. The company began to concentrate on building a railroad to meet with the canal in Cumberland, or with the railroad at Westernport.

With production going well, iron piled up in Lonaconing. In 1842, sales of pig iron to foundries in Cumberland began, with delivery by wagon. An adjacent sawmill and lumberyard, also owned by the company, recorded sales to the nearby Mount Savage Iron Works, then involved in building its own furnaces. In the fall of 1842, pig iron was offered to the B&O Railroad at a price of $29 per ton.

A major figure at the Lonaconing iron furnace was Christian Edward Detmold (1810–1887). A civil engineer born in Hannover, Germany, Detmold had entered the U.S. at age 16 while en route to Brazil to join the Army. He stayed in the U.S. and did surveys for a railroad in Charleston, South Carolina, won a $500 prize for a horse treadmill car from the Charleston & Hamburg Railroad & Canal Co., and worked for the U.S. War Department on the construction of Fort Sumter.

From 1845 to 1852 Detmold was involved in iron production at Lonaconing. He was responsible for the construction of the tram road in 1847 from Lonaconing to Clarysville, Maryland. This line connected with the Eckhart Branch Railroad, constructed by the Maryland Mining Company. Detmold leased the furnace, overhauled the boilers, and rebuilt the engine house. The furnace went back into blast in May 1846, and Detmold had a flourishing business by 1847. He was producing 2500 tons of pig iron annually. The company, perhaps jealous of his success, declined to renew his lease.

Detmold moved on to direct construction of the Exhibit of Industry, at the Crystal Palace in New York, which opened in July 1853. He is remembered by having both a town and a Cumberland and Pennsylvania Railroad (C&P) engine named after him.

== Railroad ==
Delivery of the manufactured iron was a problem at Lonaconing. After experimenting with a horse-powered tram road, the company realized that a rail line, built down the Georges Creek Valley toward the Potomac River at Westernport, would be the answer to the transportation issue. As a result, the Georges Creek Railroad was completed in 1853.

The rail line was unfortunately too late to provide the needed market access for the Lonaconing Iron Furnace. The furnace was abandoned in 1855. Coal, not iron, became the most important commodity shipped out of the region, as better grades of iron ore were discovered in Pennsylvania and the Great Lakes region.

== Furnace shut down ==
After taking back the furnace facility from Detmold, Georges Creek C&I operated it sporadically. The furnace produced 1,860 tons of pig iron in its last active year, 1855. It was then shut down, and abandoned. Harvey (1977) states that the furnace facility was too technologically advanced for its time. However, it provided an impetus for the mining industry and for the construction of the railroad, and served as a model for a similar iron working facility built at Mount Savage. There was technology sharing and cooperation between the facilities at Lonaconing and at Mount Savage.

The Georges Creek Railroad was sold to the C&P on October 23, 1863.
