= Maryland Mining Company =

Company that operated in Allegany County, Maryland, US

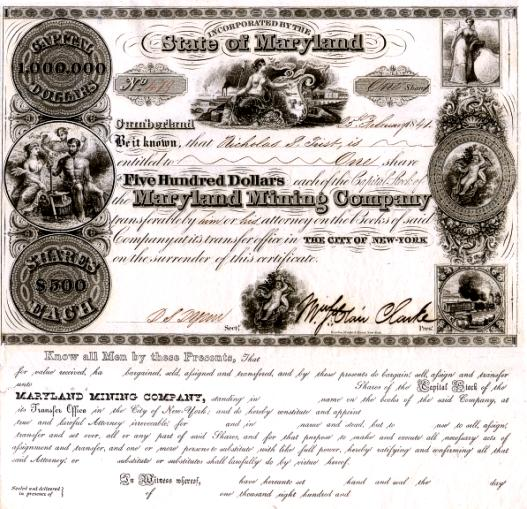
Stock certificate from Maryland Mining Company issued in 1841

The Maryland Mining Company is a historic coal mining, iron producer and railroad company that operated in Allegany County, Maryland, United States.

The company was based in Eckhart Mines, Maryland; the location in Braddock Run was among the first bituminous coal mines developed in the Georges Creek Valley.

== History ==
This region saw significant industrialization, with the first pig iron to be smelted at Mount Savage, Maryland to the northwest by the Maryland and New York Coal and Iron Company. Coal mining began in Eckhart Mines after "The Big Vein" was opened in 1820. The coal was originally transported by flatboats placed together on the headwaters of the North Branch Potomac River. As part of its operations, the company built the Potomac Wharf Branch rail line from Wills Creek, west of Cumberland, between 1846 and 1850, as an extension to its Eckhart Branch Railroad.

The Cumberland Coal & Iron Company, chartered in 1850, purchased the Maryland Mining Company's mines and railroad in April 1852, including the village of Eckhart.

With the arrival of the Baltimore and Ohio Railroad (B&O) in Cumberland, Maryland in 1842, local interests began lobbying for the construction of branch lines leading to the coal mines at Eckhart Mines, and the iron furnaces at Mount Savage, Maryland. The B&O didn't want to invest into branches for political as well as financial reasons. Eventually the Maryland & New York Coal & Iron Co. chartered and built its own Cumberland and Pennsylvania Railroad with the purpose of connecting with, and hopefully later selling out to, the B&O near the Cumberland Narrows.

The line to the Mt. Savage works was finished and operating in December 1844, while Maryland Mining's Eckhart branch entered service in May 1846. Throughout the following years, the Mt. Savage operation fell on hard times, and the Eckhart coal business has always been the more prosperous of the two. The C&P later became the initial stretch of B&O's main line to Connellsville, Pennsylvania, first via trackage rights and following 1903 by way of lease. Eckhart Jct. was established just west of the Narrows, Mt. Savage Jct. a few miles to the north.

== Timeline of the railroad ==
1845 - Mount Savage Coal & Iron Company (later Maryland & New York Coal and Iron Company) completes the Mount Savage Railroad, from Mt. Savage furnaces to Cumberland, with branches.

1846 - Maryland Mining Company completes the Eckhart Railroad, from Eckhart Mines, Maryland to Wills Creek (Eckhart Junction).

1850 - Cumberland & Pennsylvania Railroad (C&P) is chartered.

1850 - Eckhart Railroad completes the Potomac Wharf Branch into Cumberland.

1853 - Georges Creek Coal & Iron Company builds the Georges Creek Railroad between Lonaconing, Maryland and Piedmont, West Virginia.

1863 - C&P acquires the Georges Creek Railroad after purchasing the Mt. Savage Railroad.

1870 - C&P absorbs Eckhart Railroad.

1876 - The Maryland and American Coal Companies start building the George's Creek and Cumberland Railroad (GC&C).

1879 - The Pennsylvania railroad in Maryland company completes its line between the Pennsylvania State Line and Cumberland.

1888 - Pennsylvania railroad in Maryland and the Georges Creek and Cumberland Railroad were merged into the Georges Creek and Cumberland Railroad.

1907 - Western Maryland Railroad assumes control of the GC&C as part of the George Gould empire (merged into WM in 1917).

1939 - GC&C abandoned west of Eckhart Junction.

1944 - WM acquires C&P.

1953 - C&P formally merges with WM.

1982 - State Line Branch abandoned.

These railroads were built by the iron and coal companies in the early 1840s, in anticipation of connecting with the B&O Railroad and the Chesapeake and Ohio Canal, both then under construction to Cumberland. Some of these standard gauge mine roads owned and operated their own equipment, while others were operated with early B&O motive power and rolling stock. By 1870, all of the lines were absorbed into the Cumberland & Pennsylvania Railroad, which was itself absorbed into the Western Maryland system.
