= John Linn =

John Linn is the name of:

- John Linn (politician) (1763–1821), U.S. Representative from New Jersey
- John Linn (Royal Engineer), British army engineer
- John Blair Linn (1777–1804), American poet

== See also ==
- John Lynn (disambiguation)
