= James Millholland =

American railway mechanic

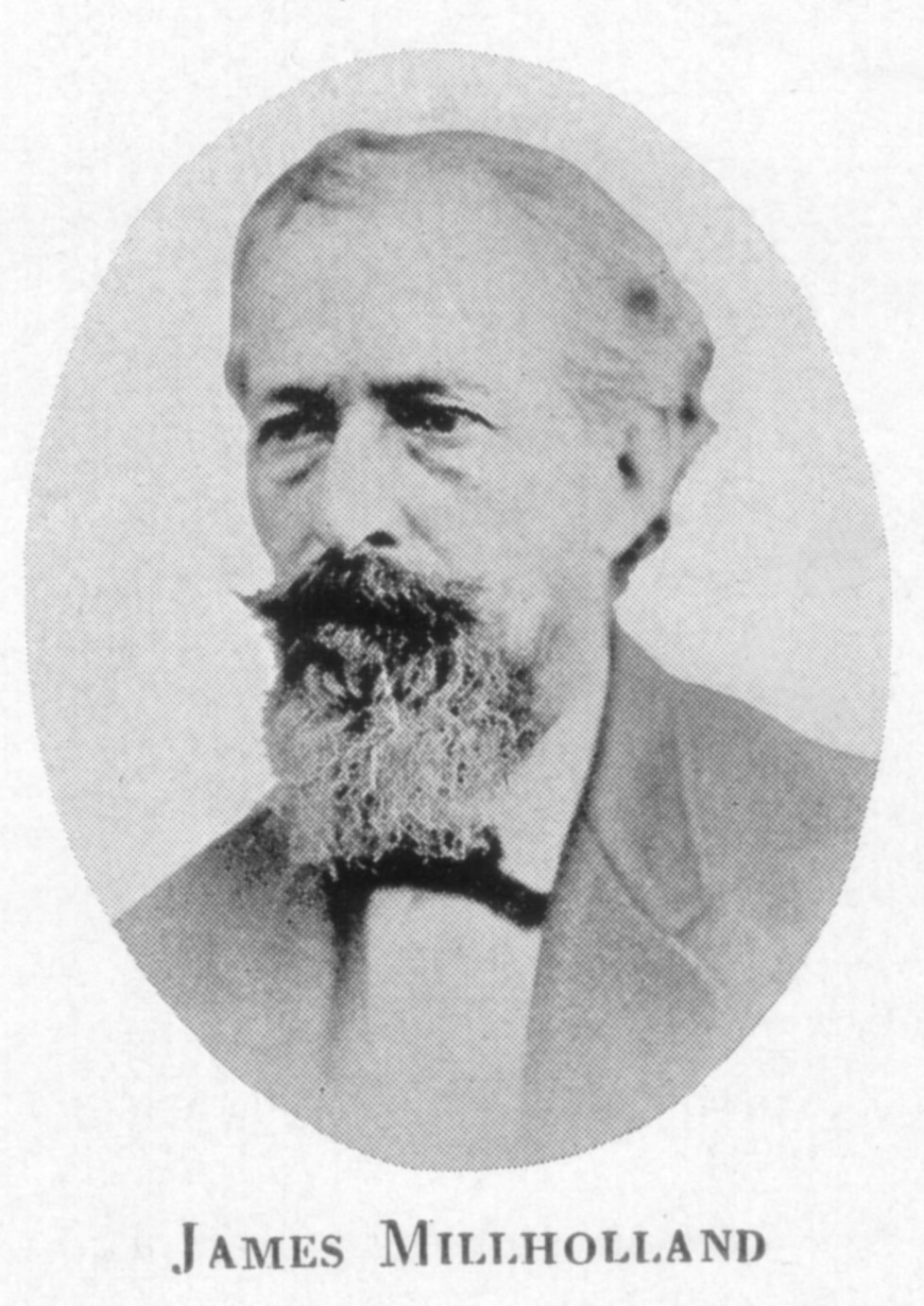

James Millholland (1812–1875) was an American railway master mechanic who is particularly well known for his invention of many railway mechanisms. His association with the Philadelphia and Reading Railroad Company as master machinist spanned fifty years in the early development of the American railroad. He also founded the locomotive shops at Mount Savage, Maryland, the center of the Cumberland and Pennsylvania Railroad.

Millholland's inventions and contributions include the cast-iron crank axle, wooden spring, plate girder bridge, poppet throttle, anthracite firebox, water grate, drop frame, and steel tires. He was also an early user and advocate of the superheater, the feedwater heater, and the injector. Several of his innovations were adopted as standard practice by the railroad industry.

His son, James A. Millholland, was a railroad executive.
