= Mount Savage Railroad =

Railway line in the United States of America

Overview
- Headquarters: Mount Savage, Maryland
- Locale: Allegany County, Maryland
- Dates of operation: 1845–1854
- Successor: Cumberland and Pennsylvania Railroad

Technical
- Track gauge: 4 ft 8 1/2 in (1,435 mm) standard gauge

The Mount Savage Railroad was a railroad operated by the Maryland and New York Coal and Iron Company of Mount Savage, Maryland between 1845 and 1854. The 14.9 miles (24 km) rail line ran from Frostburg to Cumberland, Maryland.

== History ==
The railroad was opened for use on Monday, September 24, 1845. The railroad was the first in America to use iron rail that was produced within the country, having to rely on British rail beforehand.

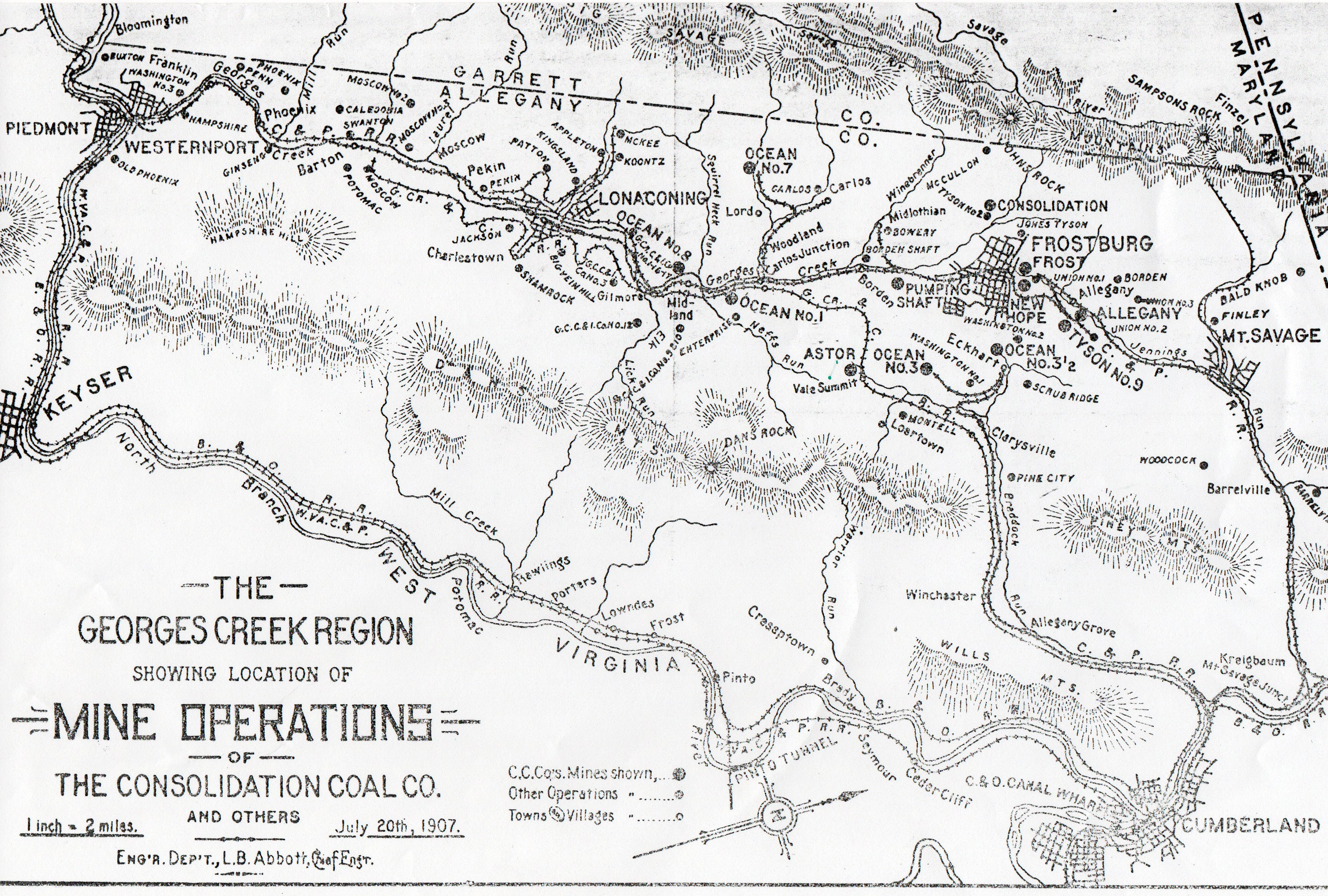
Map showing the route of the Mount Savage Railroad running from Cumberland to Mount Savage.

== Linking Mount Savage to the regional infrastructure ==
Before the railroad linked Mount Savage to Cumberland, Mount Savage had no way of transporting manufactured goods to the rest of the region. When the railroad reached Cumberland, Mount Savage now had a link to the National Road, the Chesapeake and Ohio Canal, and the Baltimore and Ohio Railroad. The interchange in the Cumberland Narrows area also linked Mount Savage to the Potomac Wharf Branch.

=== The Potomac Wharf Branch ===
The Potomac Wharf Branch was built by the Maryland Mining Company around 1850 and is an extension to the Eckhart Branch Railroad. The Potomac Wharf Branch was located in Maryland and used to cross Wills Creek. The branch is no longer present.

=== National Road ===
The Mount Savage Railroad linked Mount Savage to the National Road, where they met in Cumberland. The National Road was one of the first improved highways in the country. Construction on the road began in 1811, crossing over the Allegheny Mountains and southwest Pennsylvania. The road was finished in 1824 and connected many turnpikes to Baltimore, Maryland.

=== Baltimore and Ohio Railroad and the Chesapeake and Ohio Canal ===
The Maryland and New York Coal and Iron Company built its rail line in order to connect with the Baltimore and Ohio Railroad. The railroads provided heavy industrial manufacturing as well as a transportation resource for raw materials and finished goods. The Cumberland Wharf also offered a connection to the C&O Canal, which offered shipping to Washington, D.C.

== Layout of the railroad yard ==
The Mount Savage rail yard had at its center a twelve stall roundhouse, which also served as a passenger depot. Close by was the fire clay brick refractory, and the Ramsey Glazed Brick Works. Several connecting switchtracks connected the different factories and furnaces to the Cumberland-bound mainline. Eventually the yard also connected to the Cumberland and Pennsylvania Railroad, which connected Mount Savage to Frostburg when the rail line was completed in the 1850s.

== Current railroad activity ==
=== Mountain Thunder on The Western Maryland Scenic Railroad ===
The Mountain Thunder (Locomotive No. 734) is a restored 1916 Baldwin Steam Locomotive. The train runs on 32 miles of track connecting Cumberland and Frostburg. The journey is about 3 1/2 hours long starting at the Cumberland Station. It winds through Cumberland, The Narrows, Helmstetter Curve, the Brush Tunnel, Woodcock Hollow, and finally ending in Frostburg. Passengers get to experience the turntable at the historic Frostburg Depot before heading back to Cumberland. There are three kinds of trips on the train. You can ride first class (which includes a meal) or couch on an "Excursion Train" which is a day trip. There is a "Murder Mystery Train" which is a night trip designed for a fun night out for an adult audience, and dinner is provided. There are sixteen different stories that are performed between May and December. There are also trips on the "Santa Express". In December on designated excursion trips Santa walks through the cabins handing out candy canes and talking to the riders. These trips between May and December allow people of all ages experience and enjoy the scenic routes used for many years.

=== The Allegheny Highlands Trail ===
The Great Allegheny Passage (GAP) is 135 mile biking and hiking trail that connects Duquesne, Pennsylvania (near Pittsburgh) to Cumberland, MD. The Allegheny Highlands Trail is the section of the trail that runs between Cumberland and the Mason–Dixon line (Smith, 2006). The path is covered in crushed limestone and the majority of the trail runs right next to the Mount Savage railroad. Hikers and bikers can experience a trip along the railroad while still enjoying the scenic wilderness of the area. The trail stretches 20.47 miles (33 km) (Smith, 2006). There are three sections of the trail. The section between the Mason-Dixon line and Frostburg was opened in September 2004 (Smith, 2006). The trail between Frostburg and Woodmount Hollow opened in August 2005 (Smith, 2006). And the final section between Woodmount Hollow and Cumberland was opened on December 14, 2006 (Smith, 2006). Bikers, hikers, and pets are all welcome on the trail.

== See also ==
- Mount Savage Iron Works
