= John Galloway Lynn =

American businessman

John Galloway Lynn (October 1, 1803 – October 1, 1883) was an American businessman from Cumberland, Maryland, United States. Lynn built the Lynn Wharf, along the Potomac River at Cumberland. The wharf was used to transfer coal from the railroad to canal boats. His heirs sold this to the Maryland Mining Company. Lynn was an incorporator of the Lulworth Iron company in Maryland. He died in Cumberland.

== Sources ==
- Allen, Jay Douglas. "The Mount Savage Iron Works, Mount Savage, Maryland a case study in pre-Civil War industrial development", 1970, Thesis (M.A.) – University of Maryland, 1970.
- Aldridge, Howard Redford. The Mount Savage Iron Works, 1924, Records of Phi Mu Fraternity, University of Maryland at College Park Libraries.
- Stegmaier, Harry Jr., et al. Allegany County – A History, 1976, McClain Publishing, Parsons, WV.
- Stakem, Patrick H. Cumberland & Pennsylvania Railroad Revisited, 2002, ISBN 0-9725966-0-7.
