= Pennsylvania Railroad in Maryland =

Railroad between Cumberland, Maryland and the Pennsylvania line

Overview
- Headquarters: Cumberland, Maryland
- Locale: Cumberland; Maryland
- Dates of operation: 1876–1888
- Successor: Georges Creek and Cumberland Railroad

Technical
- Track gauge: 4 ft 8 1/2 in (1,435 mm) standard gauge
- Length: 9 miles (14 kilometres)

The Pennsylvania Railroad in Maryland company was organized in 1876. According to its charter, it was to run from Cumberland, Maryland to the Pennsylvania line where it would connect with other branches of the Pennsylvania Railroad system and provide another outlet for Maryland's soft coal to the major industrial cities. The railroad had also been promoted by coal companies in the Georges creek valley in Maryland, principally the Maryland Coal Company and the American Coal Company as well as the city of Cumberland, Maryland to provide "the benefit of a competitive road with the Baltimore and Ohio railroad, then its only outlet." The Pennsylvania railroad wanted access to the Georges creek valley coal and potential customers such as the Maryland and American coal companies. To do so, meant bypassing the Cumberland and Pennsylvania railroad which was controlled by the Consolidation Coal company, the largest bituminous coal company in the eastern United States. In 1873, the Baltimore and Ohio railroad had purchased a majority of the Consolidation Coal company's stock, thereby controlling coal exports out of the Georges creek valley and effectively the "entire output of coal in (the state of Maryland)."

Three years later in 1876, the Cumberland interests formed the Pennsylvania railroad in Maryland to escape that control. In January 1878, the railroad engaged John A Haydon to be its Chief Engineer and started construction the next year in May 1879. The road commenced passenger service to Washington and New York on December 15, 1879. The Pennsylvania railroad with access to the Georges creek valley could then transport Maryland Coal and American Coal companies' "soft coal" products to one of the three export piers the railroad controlled in South Amboy, New Jersey.

In 1888 the Pennsylvania Railroad in Maryland was merged into the Georges Creek and Cumberland Railroad. This railroad, in turn, was merged into the Western Maryland railroad in 1917 which operated the former Pennsylvania Railroad in Maryland until it was abandoned in 1982.
