= Imler, Pennsylvania =

Unincorporated community in Pennsylvania, US

- Unincorporated community
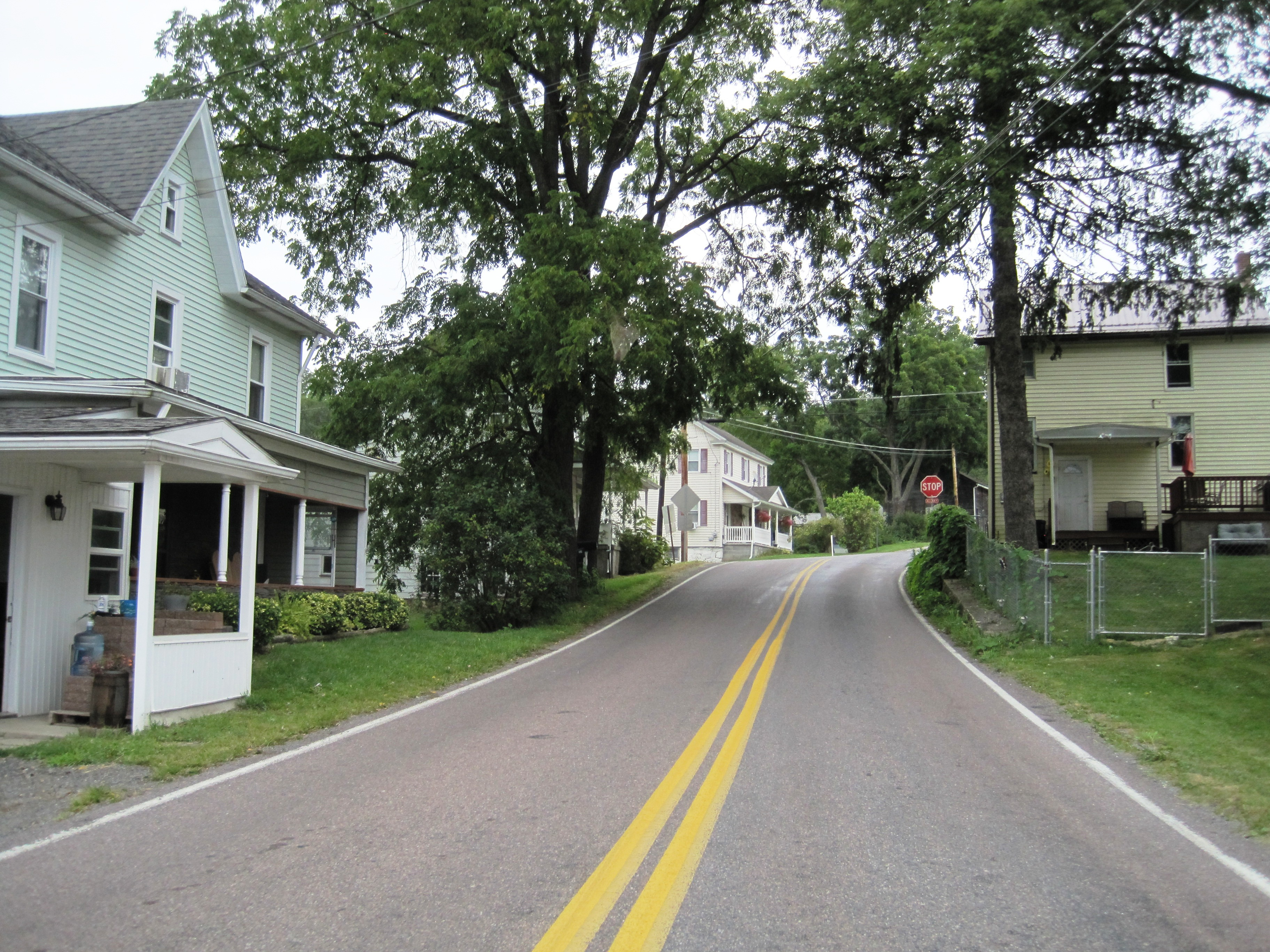
- Eastbound Mowrys Mill Road in Imler

- Location within Pennsylvania
- Coordinates: 40°12′24″N 78°31′22″W
- Country: United States
- State: Pennsylvania
- County: Bedford
- Elevation: 1,178 ft (359 m)
- Time zone: UTC-5 (Eastern (EST))
  - Summer (DST): UTC-4 (EDT)
- ZIP code: 16655
- Area code: 814
- GNIS feature ID: 1177691

Imler is an unincorporated community in Bedford County, Pennsylvania, United States. The community is located 13 miles (21 km) north of Bedford. Imler has a post office, with ZIP code 16655.
