= Eckhart Mines, Maryland =

- Census-designated place
- Location within the State of Maryland Eckhart Mines, Maryland (the United States)
- Coordinates: 39°39′20″N 78°52′49″W
- Country: United States
- State: Maryland
- County: Allegany

Area
  - Total: 1.52 sq mi (3.94 km^{2})
  - Land: 1.52 sq mi (3.94 km^{2})
  - Water: 0 sq mi (0.00 km^{2})
- Elevation: 1,873 ft (571 m)

Population (2020)
  - Total: 858
  - Density: 564/sq mi (217.7/km^{2})
- Time zone: UTC−5 (Eastern (EST))
  - Summer (DST): UTC−4 (EDT)
- ZIP code: 21528
- FIPS code: 24-24825
- GNIS feature ID: 2629795

Eckhart Mines is an unincorporated community and census-designated place (CDP) in Allegany County, Maryland, United States. As of the 2010 census it had a population of 932.

Eckhart Mines lies at the southwestern base of Federal Hill, 1.8 miles (2.9 km) east of Frostburg and 0.8 miles (1.3 km) northwest of Clarysville. Braddock Run begins near Eckhart Mines. The town was founded as a company town for the nearby Eckhart Mines. According to the Maryland Mining Heritage Guide, it was "the first coal company town in Maryland."

The original owner was George Eckhardt, an immigrant from Germany.

The outcrop of the Pittsburgh coal seam here is known locally as "the big vein" or the "14 foot coal". The Eckhart Mines' location here was the first bituminous coal mine developed in the Georges Creek Valley coalfield, because this is where the National Road (now U.S. Route 40 Alternate) crossed the coal outcrop. The Eckhart operation was known as the Maryland Mining Company, which eventually combined with other companies to form the Consolidation Coal Company (now Consol Energy). The Eckhart operation was the first commercial coal company in the United States.

== Demographics ==
Historical population
Census	Pop.	Note	%±
2020	858		—
U.S. Decennial Census

== History ==
In 1780 George Eckhardt secured lots 3644, 3645, 3646, in Allegany County. These lots were patented to him in 1800. He also had surveyed to him lot 3694, which he secured from John Stigler, to whom these lots had been awarded.

A history of Allegany County, page 448, says that "'Eckhart Mines', was a well laid out village 1789, July 12. This mining village is about one and a half miles from Frostburg, is on the Eckhart Branch of the Cumberland and Pennsylvania Railroad in the basin of the Big Savage and Dan's Mt. and is very picturesquely situated." The report given in 1940 is, that there are ten stores there, four of them being general merchandise, several being grocery stores, and two churches, the Baptist and the United Methodist churches. The population was 2300 people.
