= John Lynn (painter) =

English painter

- Known for: Painter

John Lynn was an English marine painter, active from 1826 to 1869. He painted small size shipping and coastal scenes. He exhibited at the British Institution from 1828 to 1838 and at the Suffolk Street Gallery.

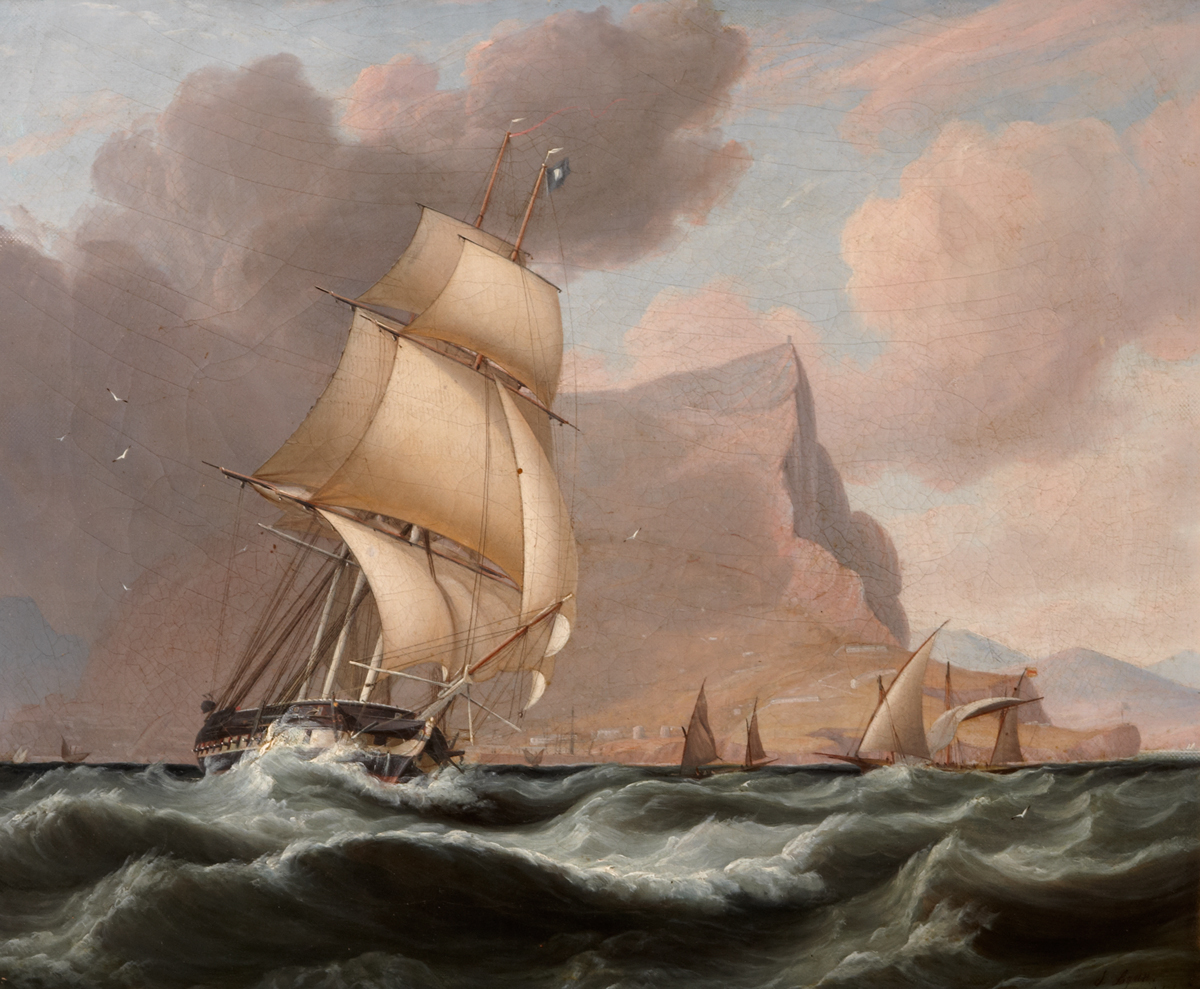
A Schooner off a Rocky Coast

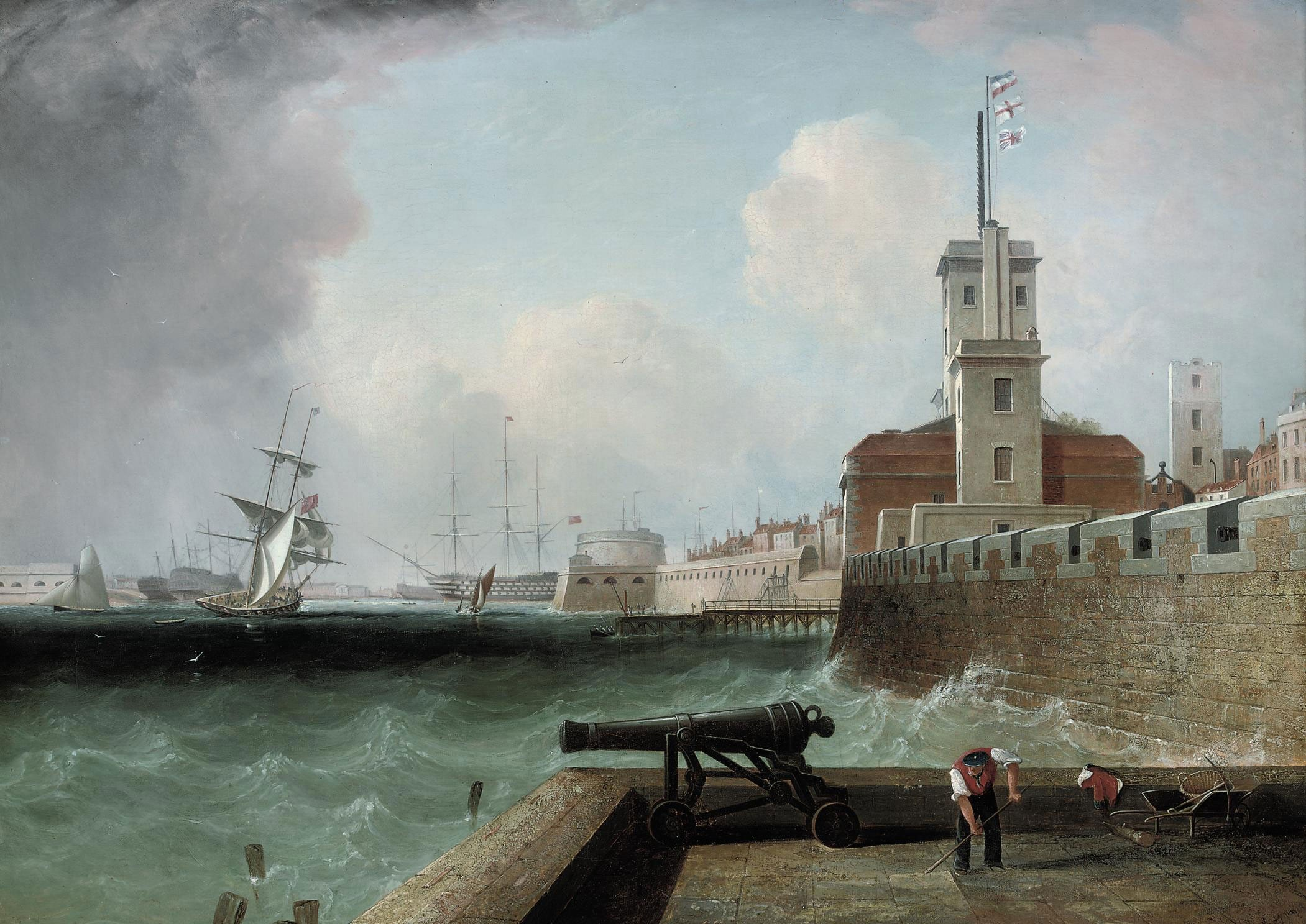
High tide below the Battery

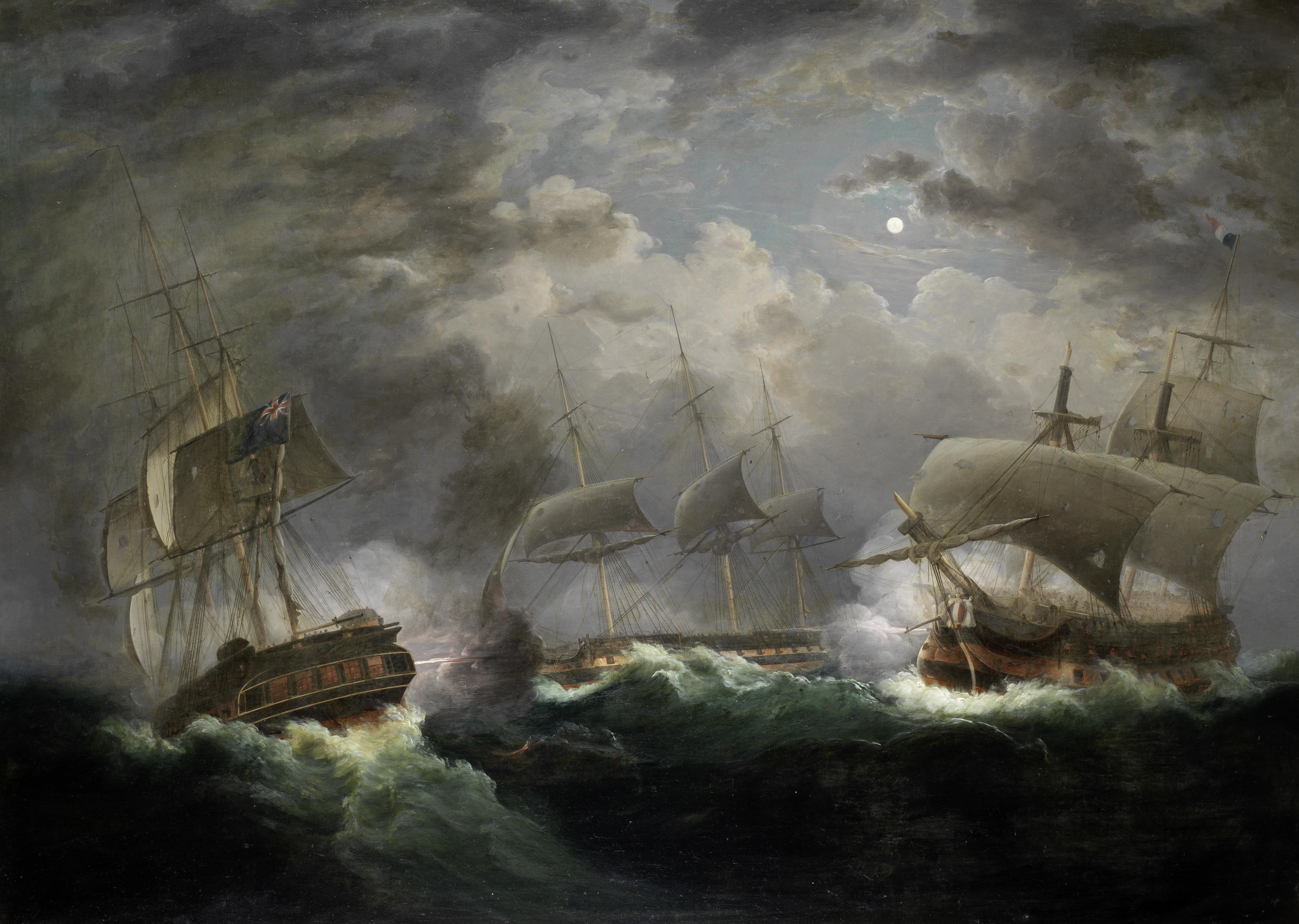
The night action off Ushant, 13–14 January 1797

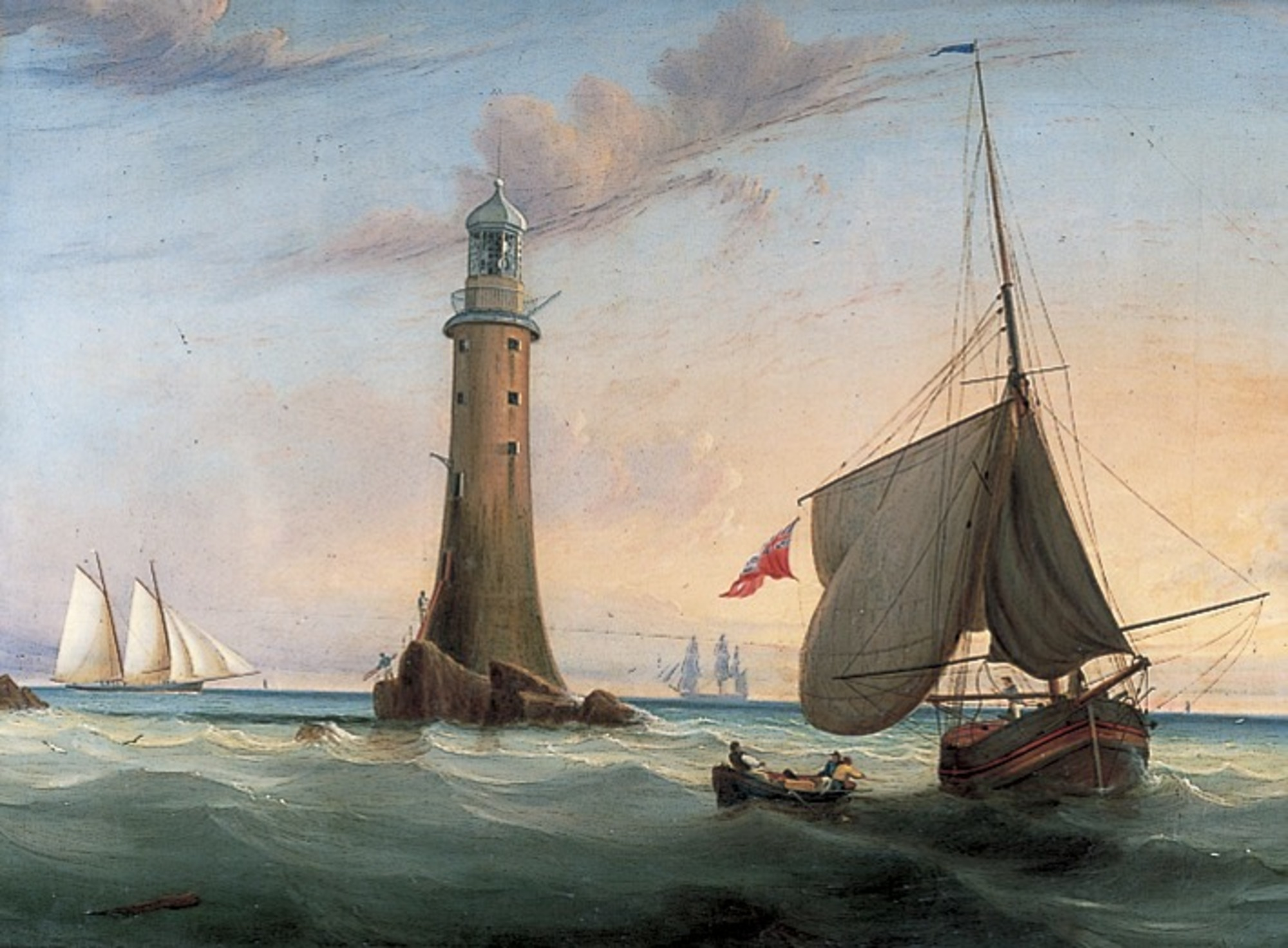
Smeaton's Eddystone Lighthouse
