= George's Creek and Cumberland Railroad =

Railroad in Maryland, US between 1876 and 1917

Map

The Georges Creek and Cumberland Railroad (GC&C) was a railroad that operated in Maryland from 1876 until 1917, when it was merged with the Western Maryland Railway (WM). The main line ran from Cumberland to Lonaconing.

== History ==
The GC&C was created by rival coal mining companies in the Georges Creek Valley to compete against the Consolidated Coal Company who dictated rail traffic over the Cumberland and Pennsylvania Railroad. By 1887 the railroad crossed the town of Midland on a large wooden trestle. The rail line came through Clarysville and Vale Summit, and went south to Lonaconing to service the mines. The trestle was removed in the 1930s.

In addition to coal hauling, the GC&C provided passenger stations and service. A published schedule of the GC&C dated January 18, 1887, shows two trains per day from Cumberland to Lonaconing (except Sundays).

The GC&C also owned a branch line, acquired in 1888 from a company called Pennsylvania railroad in Maryland, that ran from Cumberland north to the Pennsylvania state line, where it connected with the Bedford and Bridgeport Railroad. The latter company was controlled by the Pennsylvania Railroad (PRR).

The Fuller Syndicate, led by George Gould, acquired a controlling interest in the GC&C in 1907, principally to obtain access to the route through the Cumberland Narrows. The WM (which had also been controlled by Gould until 1908) took over the GC&C operation in 1913, and a full merger was completed in 1917. Under the WM, the GC&C built a new line from the Narrows through Frostburg to the Pennsylvania line, which was continued by the Connellsville and State Line Railway (another WM subsidiary) to Connellsville. WM abandoned large portions of the GC&C in 1927. The line from Cumberland to Midland was operated until 1939 when the track was abandoned. The State Line Branch to Pennsylvania was operated by the PRR until 1934.

== See also ==
- Georges Creek Railroad (1853-1863)
- Georges Creek Railway (Short line railroad operating since 2007)
- List of defunct Maryland railroads
