= Clarysville, Maryland =

- Census-designated place
- Location within the State of Maryland Clarysville (the United States)
- Coordinates: 39°38′31″N 78°53′20″W
- Country: United States
- State: Maryland
- County: Allegany

Area
  - Total: 0.12 sq mi (0.30 km^{2})
  - Land: 0.12 sq mi (0.30 km^{2})
  - Water: 0 sq mi (0.00 km^{2})
- Elevation: 1,506 ft (459 m)

Population (2020)
  - Total: 67
  - Density: 573.1/sq mi (221.28/km^{2})
- Time zone: UTC−5 (Eastern (EST))
  - Summer (DST): UTC−4 (EDT)
- ZIP code: 21532
- Area codes: 240 and 301
- FIPS code: 24-17475
- GNIS feature ID: 2583599

Clarysville is an unincorporated community and census-designated place (CDP) in Allegany County, Maryland, United States. As of the 2010 census it had a population of 73.

It is located along U.S. Route 40 Alternate at its intersection with Maryland Route 55. Frostburg is 2 miles (3 km) to the west, and Cumberland is 7 miles (11 km) to the east along Route 40 Alt.

Clarysville was known around the region for the Clarysville Inn, a historic building which stood from 1807 until it burned in 1999. During the American Civil War, the inn served as a military hospital, treating wounded soldiers.

The exit of the Hoffman drainage tunnel, constructed to drain several coal mines, is near Clarysville.

== Demographics ==
Historical population
Census	Pop.	Note	%±
2020	67		—
U.S. Decennial Census
