= Cumberland and Pennsylvania Railroad =

Defunct American railroad which operated in Western Maryland

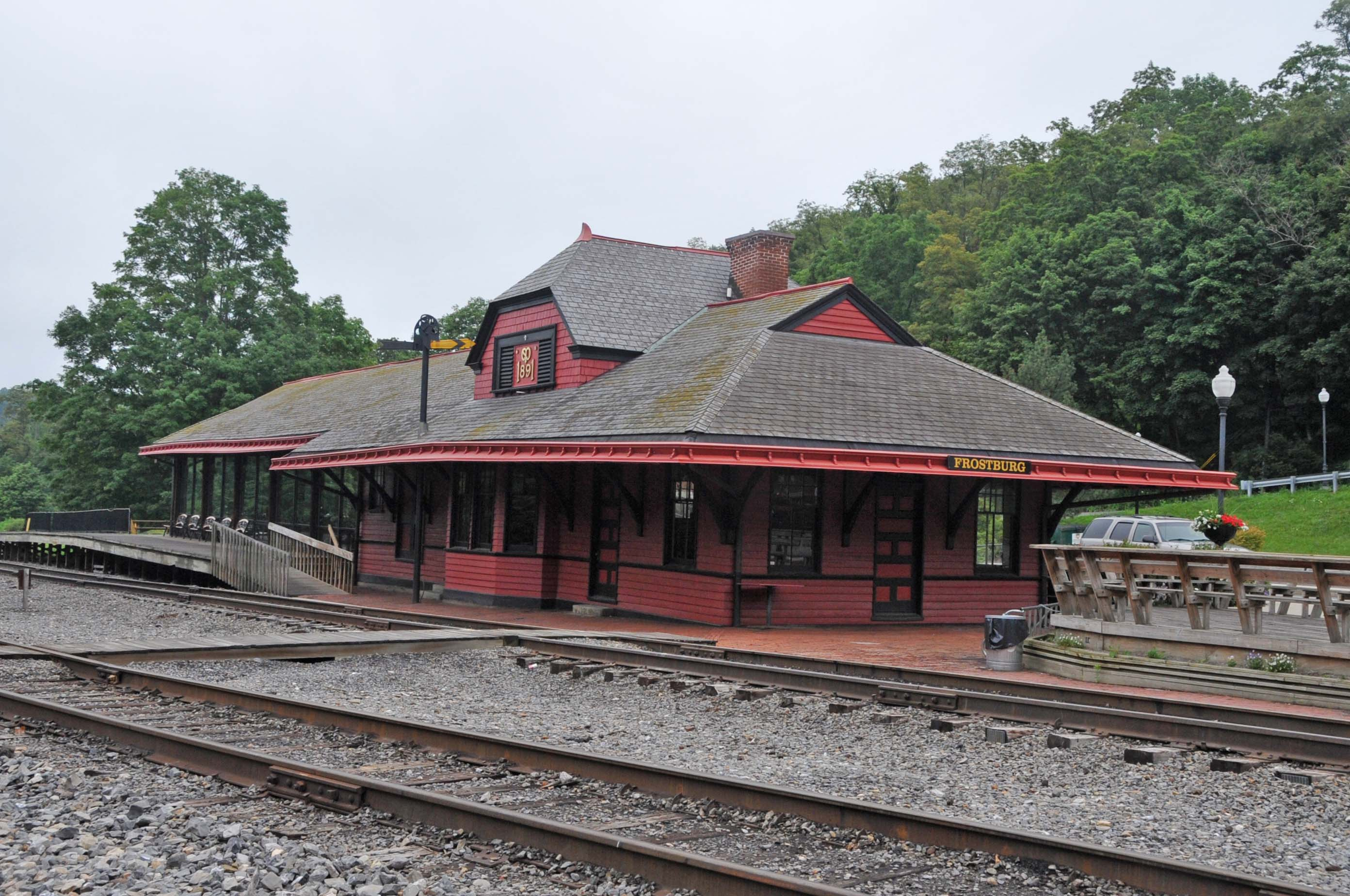
- Frostburg station

Overview
- Headquarters: Mount Savage, Maryland
- Locale: Maryland
- Dates of operation: 1850–1944
- Successor: Western Maryland Railway

Technical
- Track gauge: 4 ft 8 1/2 in (1,435 mm) standard gauge

The Cumberland and Pennsylvania Railroad (C&P) was an American railroad which operated in Western Maryland. Primarily a coal hauler, it was owned by the Consolidation Coal Company, and was purchased by the Western Maryland Railway (WM) in 1944.

The line ran from Cumberland, Maryland to Piedmont, West Virginia, at both points interchanging with the Baltimore and Ohio Railroad. The railroad's shops were located at Mount Savage, Maryland, also the location of its headquarters. On the way to Piedmont the line passed through (and under) Frostburg, Maryland, where the C&P station stands today as the western terminus of the Western Maryland Scenic Railroad.

== History ==
The Cumberland and Pennsylvania Railroad Company was incorporated on March 4, 1850, with a charter from the Maryland General Assembly. The early charter date reflects the prominence of Mt. Savage as an early foundry of iron rail and manufacturer of locomotives in the United States. The first iron rail rolled in the United States was produced at Mt. Savage in 1844.

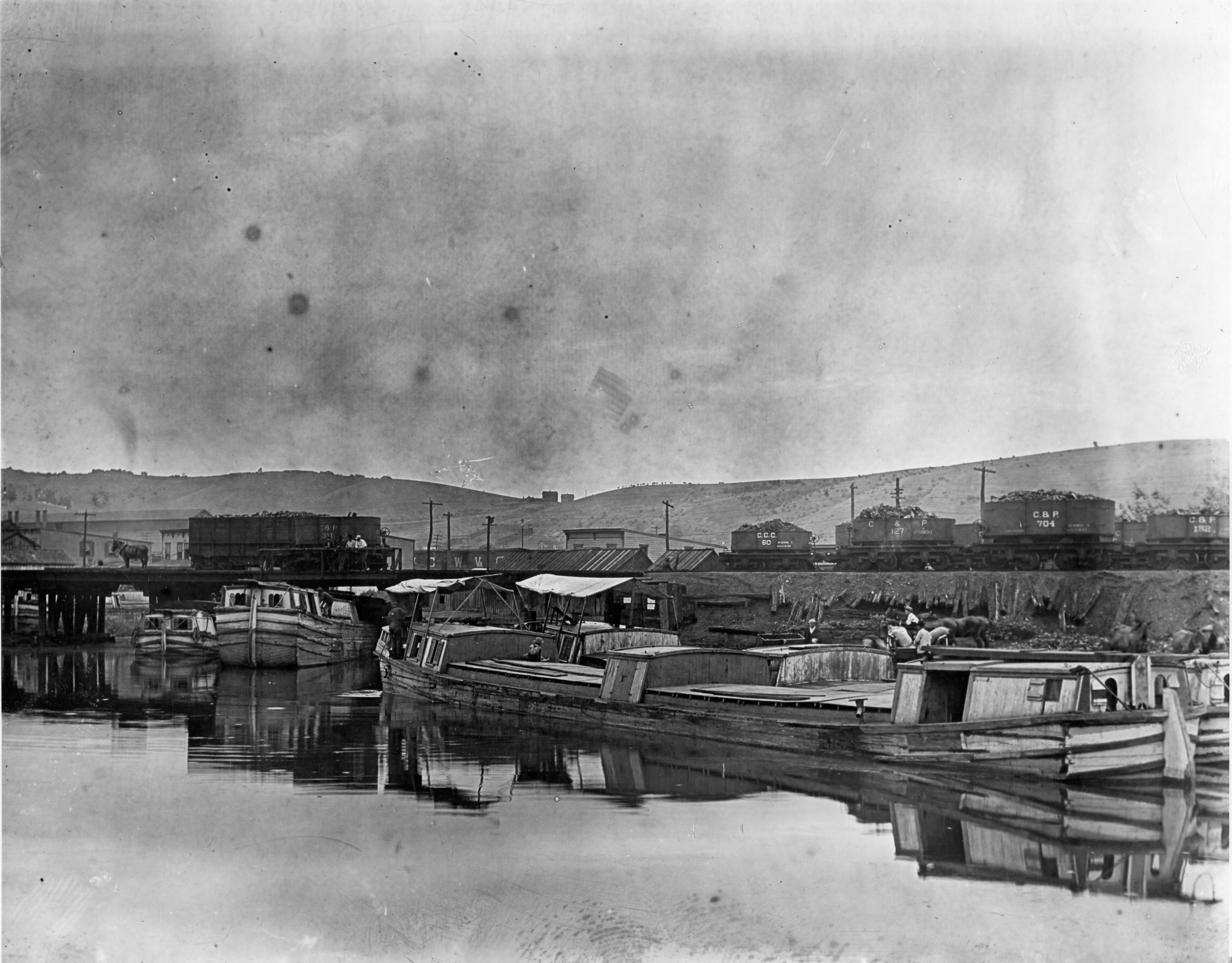
Coal hopper cars of the C&P and Consolidation Coal Co. at the western terminus of the Chesapeake and Ohio Canal in Cumberland, early 20th century.

In 1854 the C&P acquired the Mount Savage Railroad from the Mount Savage Coal and Iron Company. In 1863 the C&P acquired the Georges Creek Railroad from the Georges Creek Coal and Iron Company, and in 1870 it acquired the Eckhart Branch Railroad from the Maryland Mining Company.

In 1866 James Millholland opened the locomotive shops which became the center of the railroad. From 1868 to 1917 the shops produced at least 30 locomotives for the C&P, as well as standard and narrow gauge engines for other lines. The C&P also built passenger cars, for its own use and for other railroads.

The WM purchased the C&P from Consolidation Coal in 1944. The operations of the two companies were formally merged in 1953. All of the C&P locomotives were replaced with WM engines. In 1954 the WM abandoned redundant C&P track between Mt. Savage Junction and Mt. Savage, and discontinued use of the tunnel under Frostburg, due to the tunnel's low clearances. Some branch lines to local mines were also eliminated. Coal traffic south of Frostburg was routed along the WM's Georges Creek Branch to the WM junction at Westernport, Maryland (directly across the North Branch Potomac River from Piedmont).

== Extant facilities ==
The depot at Frostburg was originally designed for the C&P by architect Ephraim Francis Baldwin and built in 1891. It contained an office, waiting rooms, freight and baggage sections.

In addition to the station in Frostburg, many of the shop buildings still remain at Mt. Savage. Parts of the route north from Piedmont are still in service as part of CSXT and the Georges Creek Railway (now part of the Western Maryland Scenic RR).

== See also ==
- Georges Creek Valley
- List of defunct Maryland railroads
