= National Register of Historic Places listings in Allegany County, Maryland =

Location of Allegany County in Maryland

This is a list of the National Register of Historic Places listings in Allegany County, Maryland.

This is intended to be a complete list of the properties and districts on the National Register of Historic Places in Allegany County, Maryland, United States. Latitude and longitude coordinates are provided for many National Register properties and districts; these locations may be seen together in a map.

There are 46 properties and districts listed on the National Register in the county.

Contents: Counties in Maryland
Allegany - Anne Arundel - Baltimore (city) - Baltimore County - Calvert - Caroline - Carroll - Cecil - Charles - Dorchester - Frederick - Garrett - Harford - Howard - Kent - Montgomery - Prince George's - Queen Anne's - Somerset - St. Mary's - Talbot - Washington - Wicomico - Worcester

This National Park Service list is complete through NPS recent listings posted February 20, 2026.

== Current listings ==
	Name on the Register	Image	Date listed	Location	City or town	Description
1	16 Altamont Terrace	16 Altamont Terrace	July 7, 1975 (#75000858)	Northeastern corner of the junction of Altamont Ter. and Union St. 39°39′07″N 78°45′23″W	Cumberland	
2	200-208 Decatur Street	200-208 Decatur Street	July 7, 1975 (#75000859)	200, 202, 204, 206, and 208 Decatur St. 39°39′19″N 78°45′31″W	Cumberland	
3	African Methodist Episcopal Church	African Methodist Episcopal Church	April 20, 1979 (#79001105)	Decatur and Frederick Sts. 39°39′22″N 78°45′34″W	Cumberland	
4	B'er Chayim Temple	B'er Chayim Temple	November 15, 1979 (#79001106)	Union and S. Centre Sts; 39°39′02″N 78°45′38″W	Cumberland	
5	Barton Village Site		May 12, 1975 (#75000860)	Address Restricted	Cumberland	
6	Bell Tower Building	Bell Tower Building	February 20, 1973 (#73000881)	Bedford and Liberty Sts. 39°39′09″N 78°45′47″W	Cumberland	
7	Big Bottom Farm	Big Bottom Farm	June 7, 1984 (#84001319)	14220 Hazen Road; 39°43′07″N 78°41′44″W	Dickens	
8	Borden Mines Superintendent's House	Borden Mines Superintendent's House	March 22, 1984 (#84001322)	Maryland Route 36; 39°39′55″N 78°55′21″W	Frostburg	
9	Breakneck Road Historic District	Breakneck Road Historic District	May 29, 1980 (#80001777)	West of Flintstone; 39°40′40″N 78°36′45″W	Flintstone	
10	Wright Butler House	Wright Butler House	January 31, 1978 (#78001440)	205 Columbia St. 39°39′25″N 78°45′48″W	Cumberland	
11	Canada Hose Company Building	Canada Hose Company Building	September 21, 1979 (#79003257)	400-402 N. Mechanic St. 39°39′21″N 78°46′07″W	Cumberland	
12	Chapel Hill Historic District	Chapel Hill Historic District	December 28, 2005 (#05001477)	Roughly bounded by Industrial Boulevard, an unnamed alley east of South St., and E. Oldtown Rd. 39°38′16″N 78°45′43″W	Cumberland	
13	Chesapeake and Ohio Canal National Historical Park	Chesapeake and Ohio Canal National Historical Park	October 15, 1966 (#66000036)	Bordering the Potomac River from Georgetown, D.C. to Cumberland, Maryland; 39°37′31″N 78°45′34″W	Oldtown	
14	City Hall	City Hall	February 27, 1973 (#73000882)	N. Center St. between Frederick and Bedford Sts. 39°39′10″N 78°45′46″W	Cumberland	
15	Michael Cresap House	Michael Cresap House	April 14, 1972 (#72000563)	Main St. at Green Spring Rd. 39°32′30″N 78°36′42″W	Oldtown	
16	Cumberland YMCA	Cumberland YMCA	September 26, 1997 (#97001184)	205 Baltimore Ave. 39°39′10″N 78°45′31″W	Cumberland	
17	Decatur Heights Historic District	Decatur Heights Historic District	December 28, 2005 (#05001478)	Roughly along Baltimore Ave., Decatur St., Davidson St., Frederick St. and Linden St. 39°39′29″N 78°45′22″W	Cumberland	
18	Downtown Cumberland Historic District	Downtown Cumberland Historic District	August 4, 1983 (#83002917)	Roughly bounded by Mechanic, Bedford, George, and Harrison Sts. 39°39′05″N 78°45′40″W	Cumberland	
19	Evergreen	Evergreen	April 17, 2015 (#15000155)	15603 Trimble Rd., NW. 39°40′58″N 78°52′34″W	Mount Savage	
20	First Baptist Church	First Baptist Church	November 10, 1980 (#80001776)	212 Bedford St. 39°39′21″N 78°45′41″W	Cumberland	
21	Folck's Mill	Folck's Mill	November 21, 2008 (#08001071)	Address Restricted	Cumberland	
22	Footer's Dye Works	Footer's Dye Works	July 5, 2013 (#13000460)	South Mechanic and Howard Streets; 39°38′55″N 78°45′43″W	Cumberland	
23	Frostburg Historic District	Frostburg Historic District	September 8, 1983 (#83002918)	Western railroad line, Mt. Pleasant Terr., Main, Frost, Water, Broadway, Bealls, and Fairview Sts. 39°39′25″N 78°55′39″W	Frostburg	
24	Greene Street Historic District	Greene Street Historic District	December 28, 2005 (#05001482)	Greene St. between Spruce Alley and Riverside; 39°39′13″N 78°46′17″W	Cumberland	
25	Francis Haley House	Francis Haley House	July 8, 1982 (#82002804)	634 Maryland Ave. 39°38′46″N 78°45′21″W	Cumberland	
26	Hocking House	Hocking House	December 2, 1982 (#82001579)	144 E. Main St. 39°39′19″N 78°55′27″W	Frostburg	
27	Inns on the National Road	Inns on the National Road	December 22, 1976 (#76000976)	East and west of Cumberland on U.S. Route 40 from Flintstone to Grantsville; 39°39′23″N 78°48′34″W	Cumberland	
28	Klots Throwing Company Mill	Klots Throwing Company Mill	January 27, 2010 (#09001282)	917 Gay St. 39°38′34″N 78°45′38″W	Cumberland	
29	Thomas Koon House	Thomas Koon House	July 8, 1982 (#82002805)	221 Baltimore Ave. 39°39′10″N 78°45′29″W	Cumberland	
30	La Vale Tollgate House	La Vale Tollgate House	January 25, 1971 (#71000363)	14302 National Hwy., U.S. Route 40; 39°38′15″N 78°51′06″W	La Vale	
31	Lonaconing Furnace	Lonaconing Furnace	June 19, 1973 (#73000886)	E. Main St. 39°34′13″N 78°58′41″W	Lonaconing	
32	Lonaconing Historic District	Lonaconing Historic District	September 15, 1983 (#83002919)	Maryland Routes 36 and 657, and Douglas Ave., Church, E. Main and Railroad Sts. 39°34′11″N 78°58′45″W	Lonaconing	
33	Mount Savage Historic District	Mount Savage Historic District	September 8, 1983 (#83004213)	Roughly bounded by Foundry Row, Jennings Run, New School Rd., Yellow Row, Cherry St., and Columbia Ave. 39°41′47″N 78°52′49″W	Mount Savage	
34	Old National Pike Milestones	Old National Pike Milestones	November 27, 1975 (#75002107)	Maryland Routes 144 and 165, U.S. Route 40, U.S. Route 40 Alternate, and U.S. Route 40 Scenic; 39°25′13″N 77°16′01″W	Bellegrove	
35	Phoenix Mill Farm	Phoenix Mill Farm	August 12, 1977 (#77000681)	Smouses Hill Road off Maryland Route 220; 39°42′38″N 78°41′39″W	Dickens	
36	Public Safety Building	Public Safety Building	April 13, 1973 (#73000883)	Frederick and Liberty Sts. 39°39′08″N 78°45′46″W	Cumberland	
37	Rolling Mill Historic District	Rolling Mill Historic District	December 24, 2008 (#08001215)	Portions of Williams, Elm, Spring, Short, Baker, and Ascension Sts., Miltenberger Pl., Sheridan Pl., and Maryland Ave. 39°38′46″N 78°45′20″W	Cumberland	
38	Shaw Mansion	Shaw Mansion	June 19, 1985 (#85001345)	Laurel Run Cemetery Road; 39°32′31″N 79°00′28″W	Barton	
39	Shawnee Old Fields Village Site		May 12, 1975 (#75000150)	Address Restricted	Oldtown	
40	Town Clock Church	Town Clock Church	August 6, 1979 (#79001107)	312 Bedford St. 39°39′25″N 78°45′40″W	Cumberland	
41	George Truog House	George Truog House	September 11, 1986 (#86002382)	230 Baltimore Ave. 39°39′13″N 78°45′29″W	Cumberland	
42	Union Grove Schoolhouse	Union Grove Schoolhouse	July 24, 1979 (#79001108)	Northeast of Cumberland on Mason Rd. 39°42′21″N 78°41′51″W	Dickens	
43	Washington Street Historic District	Washington Street Historic District	February 6, 1973 (#73000884)	Washington St. from Wills Creek to the middle of its 600 block, including Prospect Square; 39°39′05″N 78°46′15″W	Cumberland	
44	Waverly Street Bridge	Waverly Street Bridge	September 7, 1984 (#84001327)	Waverly St. at Georges Creek; 39°29′23″N 79°02′34″W	Westernport	
45	Western Maryland Railroad Right-of-Way, Milepost 126 to Milepost 160	Western Maryland Railroad Right-of-Way, Milepost 126 to Milepost 160	July 23, 1981 (#81000078)	Milepost 126 to Milepost 160; 39°33′53″N 78°32′08″W	North Branch	
46	Western Maryland Railway Station	Western Maryland Railway Station	June 19, 1973 (#73000885)	Canal St. 39°38′58″N 78°45′50″W	Cumberland	

== Former listing ==
	Name on the Register	Image	Date listed	Date removed	Location	City or town	Description
1	Queen City Hotel	Queen City Hotel	March 12, 1971 (#71001052)	1972	Park and Harrison Sts. 39°39′01″N 78°45′27″W	Cumberland	Damaged by fire in 1969. Demolished in October 1971.

== See also ==
- List of National Historic Landmarks in Maryland
- National Register of Historic Places listings in Maryland
