= Mount Savage =

Mount Savage may refer to:

- Mount Savage, Kentucky
- Mount Savage, Maryland
  - Mount Savage Locomotive Works
  - Mount Savage Iron Works
  - Mount Savage Railroad
  - Mount Savage Castle
  - Mount Savage Historic District

== See also ==
- Savage Mountain
