= Maryland Route 807 =

State highway in Maryland, United States

Maryland Route 807
- Bedford Road

Route information
- Maintained by MDSHA
- Length: 3.52 mi (5.66 km)
- Existed: 1982–present

Major junctions
- West end: Bedford Street in Cumberland
- MD 144 near Cumberland
- East end: US 220 near Dickens

Location
- Country: United States
- State: Maryland
- Counties: Allegany

Highway system
- Maryland highway system; Interstate; US; State; Scenic Byways
← MD 806	→ MD 808

Maryland Route 807 (MD 807) is an unsigned state highway in the U.S. state of Maryland. Known as Bedford Road, the state highway runs 3.52 miles (5.66 km) from the city limits of Cumberland north to U.S. Route 220 (US 220) in Dickens. MD 807 is the original alignment of US 220 north of Cumberland. The state highway was assigned to the portion of highway between the city line and Naves Cross Road, presently MD 144, after US 220 was moved to Interstate 68 through downtown Cumberland in 1982. MD 807 was extended to its present northern terminus when the US 220 Bedford Road bypass opened in 2000.

== Route description ==
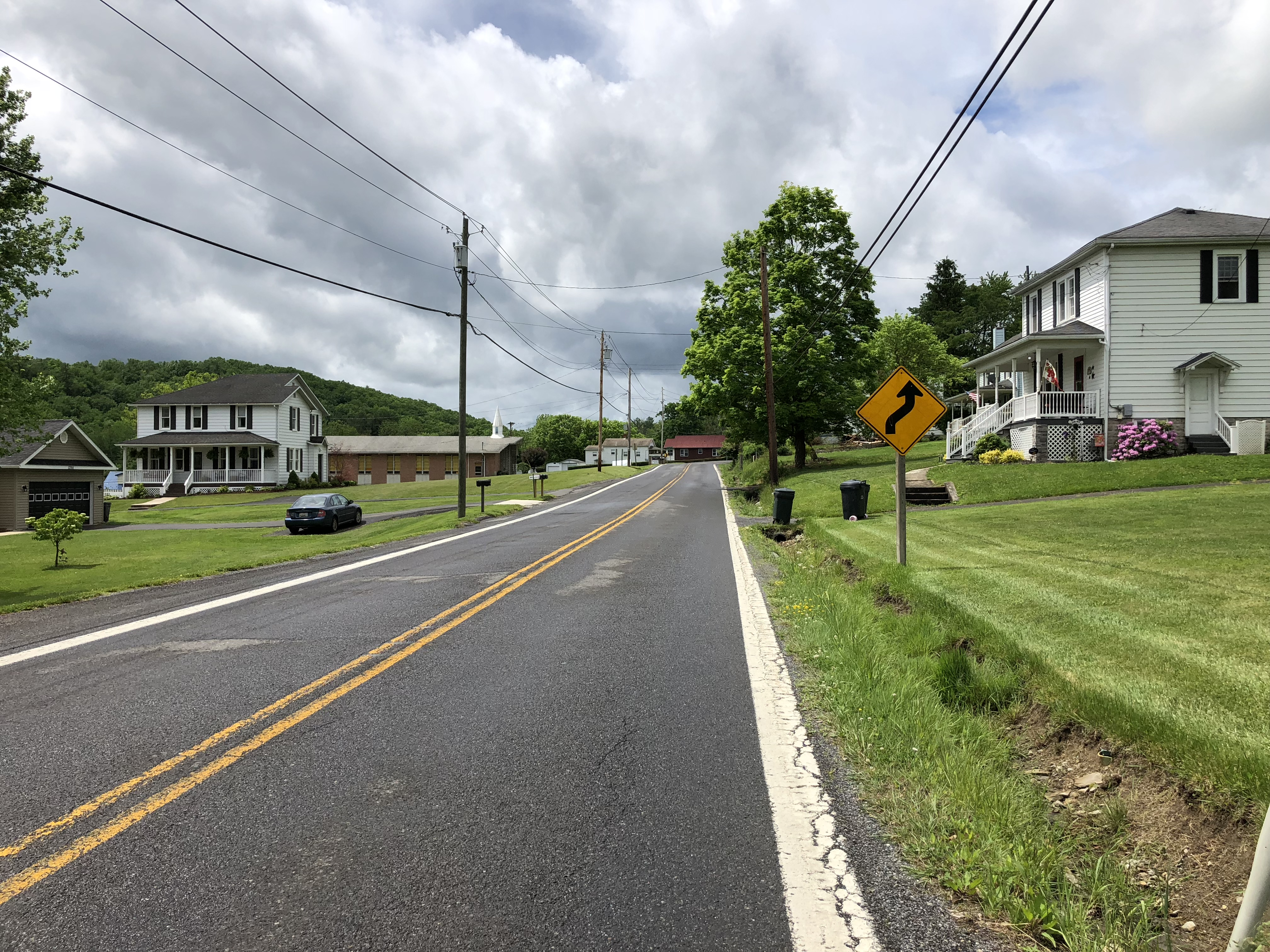
View south along MD 807 north of Cumberland

MD 807 begins at the Cumberland city limits. Bedford Street and Frederick Street continue southwest toward downtown Cumberland as the southbound and northbound directions of a one-way pair. Shortly after state maintenance begins, MD 807 intersects MD 144 (Naves Cross Road), which heads east toward I-68 and US 40. MD 807 continues north as a two-lane undivided road past residences between two mountain ridges. The state highway intersects an old alignment of Bedford Road (unsigned MD 807B) before meeting its northern terminus at US 220 in the community of Dickens. Smouses Mill Road (unsigned MD 807E) continues on the eastern side of the intersection.

== History ==
Bedford Street was paved in the city of Cumberland from downtown to Naves Cross Road by 1910. Bedford Road was paved between Naves Cross Road and roughly the present intersection of US 220 and Bedford Road by 1915, with the final segment to the Pennsylvania state line completed shortly thereafter. Bedford Street and Bedford Road were designated as the southernmost portion of US 220 when the federal highway was designated in 1927. MD 807 was assigned to the stretch of Bedford Road between the Cumberland city line and Naves Cross Road shortly after US 220 was rerouted onto I-68 through downtown Cumberland in 1982. US 220 followed Naves Cross Road between the freeway and Bedford Road, then turned north on Bedford Road. Following the relocation of US 220 north of Cumberland in 2000, MD 807 was extended to its present northern terminus.

== Junction list ==
The entire route is in Allegany County.

Location	mi	km	Destinations	Notes
Cumberland	0.00	0.00	Bedford Street south – Downtown Cumberland	Southern terminus; Cumberland city limit
Cumberland	0.32	0.51	MD 144 east (Naves Cross Road) to I-68 – Hancock, Hagerstown	Western terminus of MD 144
Dickens	3.52	5.66	US 220 / Smouses Mill Road east – Bedford	Northern terminus; Smouses Mill Road is unsigned MD 807E
1.000 mi = 1.609 km; 1.000 km = 0.621 mi

== Auxiliary routes ==
Five auxiliary routes of MD 807 were designated following the completion of the Bedford Road bypass in 2000.

- MD 807A is the designation for Naves Cross Road, a 0.10-mile (0.16 km) link from the main line of Naves Cross Road, MD 144, east to Mason Road on the north side of I-68 at Exit 46. This state highway, which was previously designated US 220A, is part of the old alignment of Naves Cross Road prior to the construction of I-68 through the area in the 1960s.
- MD 807B is the designation for Bedford Road, a road serving residences to the west of US 220 in Dickens. This 0.38-mile (0.61 km) spur is part of the old alignment of US 220.
- MD 807C is the designation for an unnamed road serving a church on the west side of US 220 just south of the state line. This 0.10-mile (0.16 km) spur is also part of the old alignment of US 220.
- MD 807D is the designation for Pine Ridge Road, a road relocated when the US 220 bypass was completed. The 0.23-mile (0.37 km) state highway heads east from US 220 and intersects the original alignment of Pine Ridge Road, now designated Granet Road, before reaching its eastern terminus. Pine Ridge Road continues as a county-maintained road to the Pennsylvania state line.
- MD 807E is the designation for Smouses Mill Road, another road relocated when the US 220 bypass was built. The state highway runs 0.07 miles (0.11 km) from an intersection with Hazen Road north to the intersection of US 220 and MD 807. MD 807E provides access to three historic sites: Big Bottom Farm, Phoenix Mill Farm, and Union Grove Schoolhouse.
