= African Methodist Episcopal Church (disambiguation) =

African Methodist Episcopal Church may refer to:

- African Methodist Episcopal Church, a religious denomination, or the similar African Methodist Episcopal Zion Church.
  - List of African Methodist Episcopal Churches
- African Methodist Episcopal Church (Cumberland, Maryland), listed on the National Register of Historic Places

== See also ==
- First African Methodist Episcopal Church (disambiguation)
