= Evergreen (Mount Savage, Maryland) =

- U.S. National Register of Historic Places
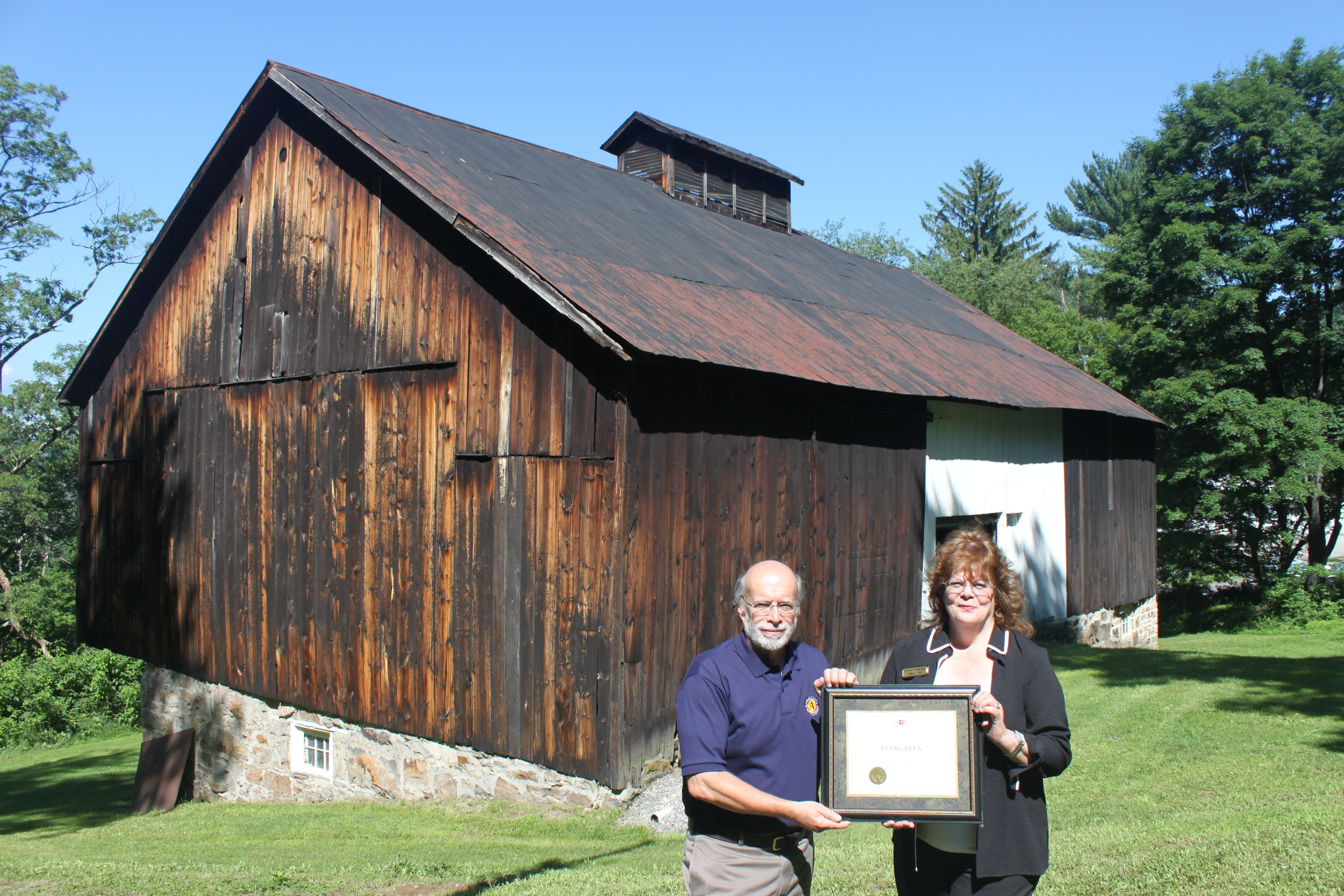

- Location within Maryland Location within the United States
- Nearest city: 15603 Trimble Rd., NW., Mount Savage, Maryland
- Coordinates: 39°40′58″N 78°52′34″W
- Built: 1780
- NRHP reference No.: 15000155
- Added to NRHP: April 17, 2015

The Evergreen Heritage Center is a historic museum property on Trimble Road, east of Mount Savage, Maryland. The property, dubbed Evergreen relatively early in its history, has a history dating to the mid-18th century, and its buildings represent a distinct cross-section of styles across a period of more than 200 years. The oldest surviving element is the c. 1780 barn; the main house includes a stone portion built c. 1822–23, with its main section, built on an 18th-century foundation, exhibiting fine Late Victorian architecture. The property also includes early 20th-century industrial resources, associated with a coal tramway.

The property was listed on the National Register of Historic Places in 2015.

== See also ==
- National Register of Historic Places listings in Allegany County, Maryland
