= Mount Savage Iron Works =

Ironworks in Maryland

Coordinates: 39°41′54″N 78°53′1″W

The Mount Savage Iron Works operated from 1837 to 1868 in Mount Savage, Maryland. The ironworks were the largest in the United States in the late 1840s, and the first in the nation to produce iron rails for the construction of railroads. Before that time all iron rails were imported from England. The works were established in an area adjacent to mines for coal, iron ore and fire clay. Facilities included blast furnaces, puddling furnaces, a rolling mill, iron refineries, coke production and brick production.

== History ==
The Maryland and New York Coal and Iron Company was incorporated in 1837, and it acquired land north of Frostburg, Maryland. The company, led by Samuel Swartwout, a New York land speculator, renamed this area as the town of Mount Savage, and made plans to establish an iron works. After raising funds from investors, the company built two blast furnaces in 1840, using coke as fuel. It built a rolling mill in 1843 specifically to manufacture rails. Production of bridge rails, with an inverted "U"-shape and weighing 42 lb/yd, began in 1844. Some of the initial rail production was used to build a railroad line to Cumberland, Maryland to connect with the Baltimore and Ohio Railroad (B&O). (See Mount Savage Railroad.) The company also manufactured 50 lb/yd T-shaped rails for the Fall River Railroad in Massachusetts; and sold rails to the B&O. Production in 1845 was about 200 tons per week.

In 1846-47 the Mount Savage works faced financial problems, due to the Tariff of 1846, which ruined the iron business, and the flooding of a portion of the Mount Savage Railroad. The company defaulted on several loans. A group of New York City investors, Erastus Corning the most prominent among them, acquired the company later in 1847 and renamed it the Mount Savage Iron Company. The facilities were expanded with additional capital, and in the 1850s, the labor force grew to over 900 workers. The Cumberland and Pennsylvania Railroad became another important customer.

The works faced competition from various facilities in Pennsylvania and the Great Lakes region, where superior grades of iron ore were discovered and mined beginning in the 1850s. The facilities were acquired by the Consolidation Coal Company in 1864. The rolling mill was shut down in 1868 and dismantled in 1875. The blast furnaces ceased operation c. 1870.

== See also ==
- Mount Savage Historic District
- Mount Savage Locomotive Works
- Technological and industrial history of the United States
