= Footer's Dye Works =

Historic building in Maryland, USA

- U.S. National Register of Historic Places
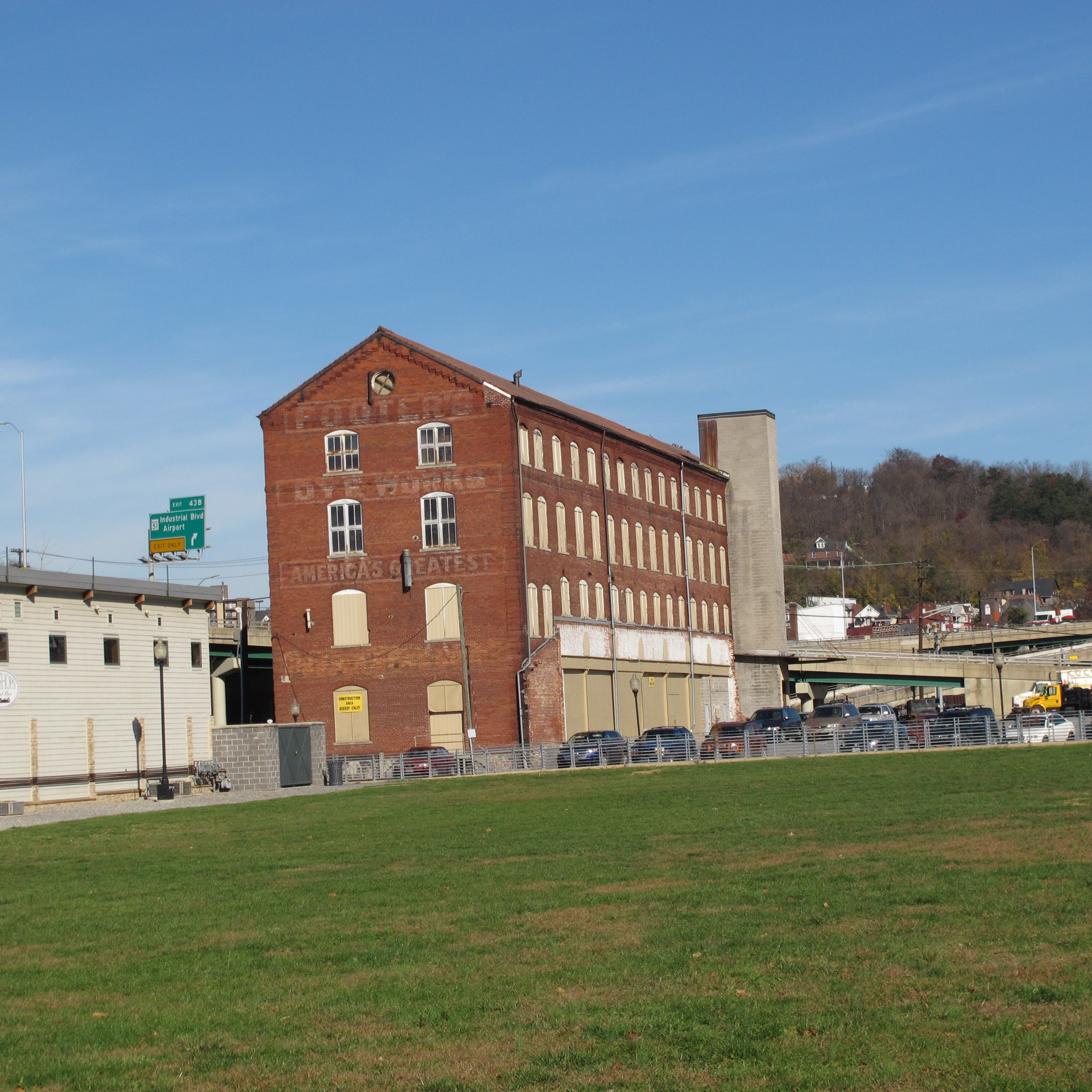
- Footer's Dye Works in 2014

- Location within Maryland Location within the United States
- Nearest city: South Mechanic and Howard Streets, Cumberland, Maryland
- Coordinates: 39°38′34″N 78°45′38″W
- Built: 1906
- NRHP reference No.: 13000460
- Added to NRHP: July 5, 2013

The Footer's Dye Works is a historic industrial building in Cumberland, Maryland. The four story brick building occupies most of a city block on Howard Street near its junction with South Mechanic Street. Built in 1906, it is the last surviving building of a large cleaning and dyeing business that was once one of Cumberland's major employers.Throughout the 1920s, Footer's Dye Works continued as one of the dominant cleaning and dyeing establishments in the region.

At its peak the Footer's Dye Works boasted of a weekly payroll exceeding several thousand dollars. With nearly 500 employees, the company had branch offices located in twenty cities in nearby states for the receiving and forwarding of goods. One source of business originated from Washington; lace curtains from the White House were shipped to Footer's for cleaning. Major branch offices were located in Baltimore, Philadelphia, and Pittsburgh, according to the company's advertising flier.

The 1930s, however, brought hard times to Footer's Dye Works. It was in the 1930s that the new "dry" cleaning process was beginning to take hold, replacing the steam cleaning process used in Footer's factory. With the Great Depression in full swing throughout the United States, pressure from dry cleaning competition, and then a devastating Potomac River flood in March 1936, Footer's Dye Works filed for bankruptcy on June 12, 1936. On December 30, the plant was sold by a court trustee to the Federal Reserve Bank of Richmond, which held the mortgage, for $200,000.16 With the sale of the Footer's Dye Works property, the cleaning and dyeing operation closed.

By 1939, Harry Footer opened a cleaning business in the old Footer's building on N. Liberty St. called Harry Footer & Co. His was among twenty "Clothes Pressers and Cleaners" listed in Cumberland in 1939. In June 1939, part of the Footer's S. Mechanic St. complex was sold to Liberty Cleaners & Dyers, Inc. This company was likely a secondary operation of Harry Footer's Liberty St. cleaners.

Between 1939 and 1949, the former Footer's Dye Works complex was subdivided and sold. The 1939 deed to Liberty Cleaners noted that another part of the complex was deeded earlier to "Red Head Oil Co. The 1949 map shows not only the dry cleaners and oil company sections, but a "Trade School" in the easternmost buildings and a "Montgomery Ward warehouse" in the first floor of the four-story brick building along Howard St. and its one-story saw tooth south section (the building still standing in 2005). By 1956, when the last Sanborn Insurance Co. map was drawn of the complex, most of the eastern section was demolished and replaced with a parking lot. The cleaners, oil company, and Montgomery Ward still occupied their buildings. But the large four-story brick building that housed the Wards warehouse also had the state employment offices in the second floor and the Army Reserve in the third floor

The building was listed on the National Register of Historic Places in 2013.

== See also ==
- National Register of Historic Places listings in Allegany County, Maryland
