= Mount Savage Castle =

Coordinates: 39°41′42″N 78°52′58″W

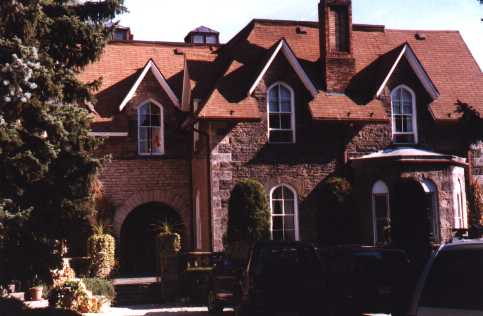

The Mount Savage Castle is located in Mount Savage, Maryland. It was built in 1840 as a plain stone house by the Union Mining Company. Before the turn of the 20th century, the house was purchased by Andrew Ramsey, an immigrant from Scotland who extensively modified the house and converted it into a replica of Craig Castle near his home in Scotland. In 1984, the castle was renovated as a bed and breakfast facility.
