= First African Methodist Episcopal Church =

First African Methodist Episcopal Church may refer to:

- First African Methodist Episcopal Church (Athens, Georgia)
- First African Methodist Episcopal Church (Oakland, California)
- First African Methodist Episcopal Church of Los Angeles

== See also ==
- African Methodist Episcopal Church (disambiguation)
