= Francis Haley House =

Historic house in Maryland, United States

- U.S. National Register of Historic Places
- U.S. Historic district – Contributing property
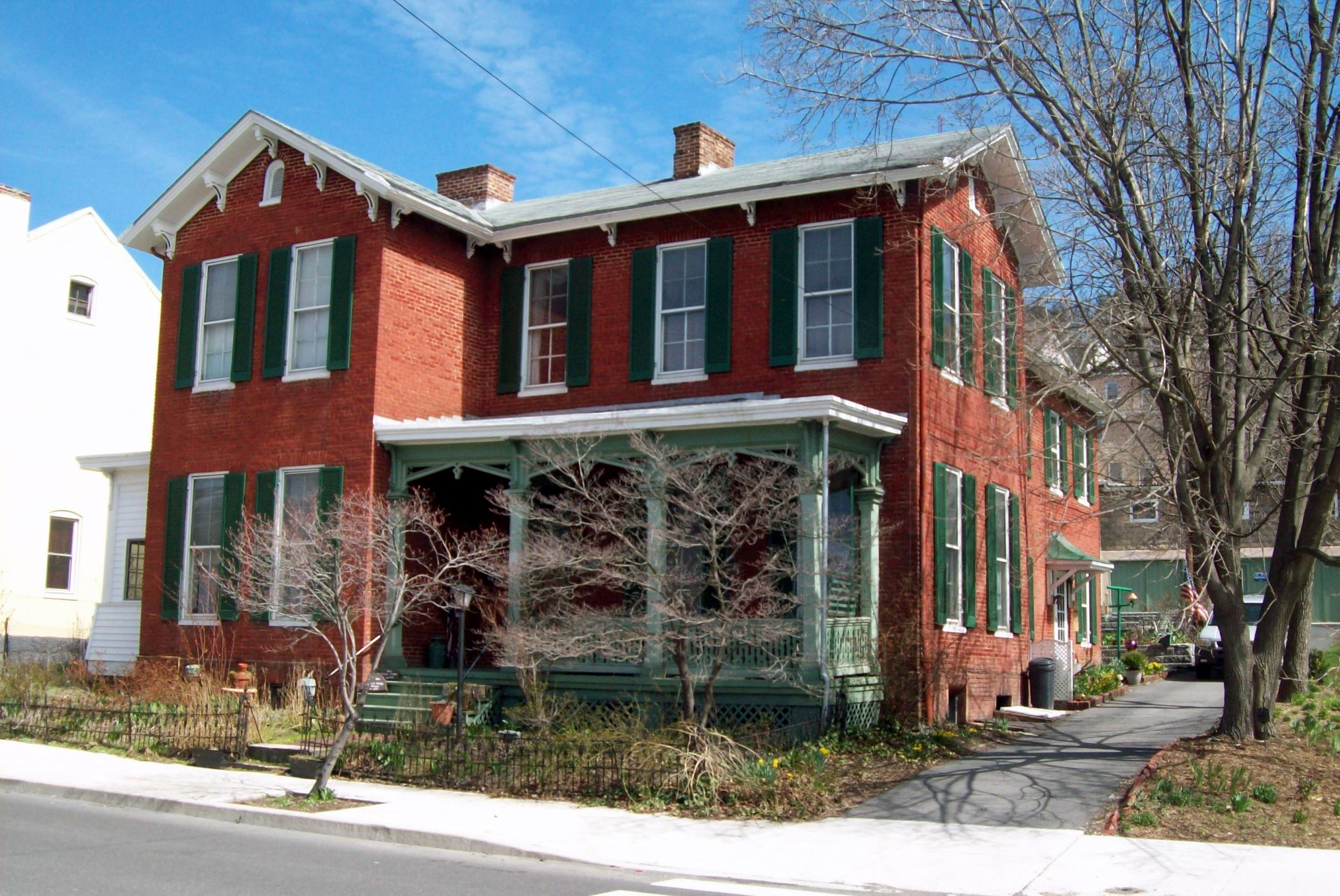
- Francis Haley House, March 2011

- Location within Maryland Location within the United States
- Location: 634 Maryland Ave., Cumberland, Maryland
- Coordinates: 39°38′46″N 78°45′21″W
- Area: less than one acre
- Built: 1870
- Architectural style: Italianate
- NRHP reference No.: 82002804
- Added to NRHP: July 8, 1982

The Francis Haley House is a historic home in Cumberland, Allegany County, Maryland, United States. The house is an Italianate-influenced 2 1/2-story, brick structure built about 1870. It was erected as the residence of a brick manufacturer, Francis Haley.

The Francis Haley House is a good example of mid-19th-century middle-class domestic architecture, with Italianate elements, in Cumberland. Throughout various eras in American history, middle-class house builders across the country adapted elements from popular 19th-century architectural styles, such as the Italianate, Gothic and Victorian. These styles were applied with a more limited range of features to homes for the middle-class in a way that was less expensive, yet indicated the modernity of the house and its occupants. The Haley House is typical of this type of house form in Cumberland, and provides a contrast to the city's elaborate upper-class Italianate houses, such as those within the Washington Street Historic District.

The Haley House was built around 1870 for Francis Haley, a successful local brick manufacturer. Haley was active in the brick trade from the 1840s until his death in the early 1880s, and in 1875 he was appointed to the committee responsible for constructing a new city hall. He also played a significant role in the development of the surrounding Rolling Mill neighborhood, where his extensive brick yards were located alongside industrial Baltimore & Ohio Railroad operations that gave the area its name. With the expansion of the railroad, Rolling Mill grew rapidly, and the Haley House became one of its most elaborate residences. Constructed appropriately of brick, the house has undergone very few alterations since Haley’s time. It consists of two perpendicular rectangular blocks with low gabled roofs supported by brackets. The gable-end windows feature rounded arches, and the interior details are simple yet substantial. A section of the original iron fence, manufactured in Ohio, still separates the property from the street.

The Francis Haley House was listed on the National Register of Historic Places in 1972. It is located in the Rolling Mill Historic District.
