= Canada Hose Company Building =

Historic firehouse in Maryland, US

- U.S. National Register of Historic Places
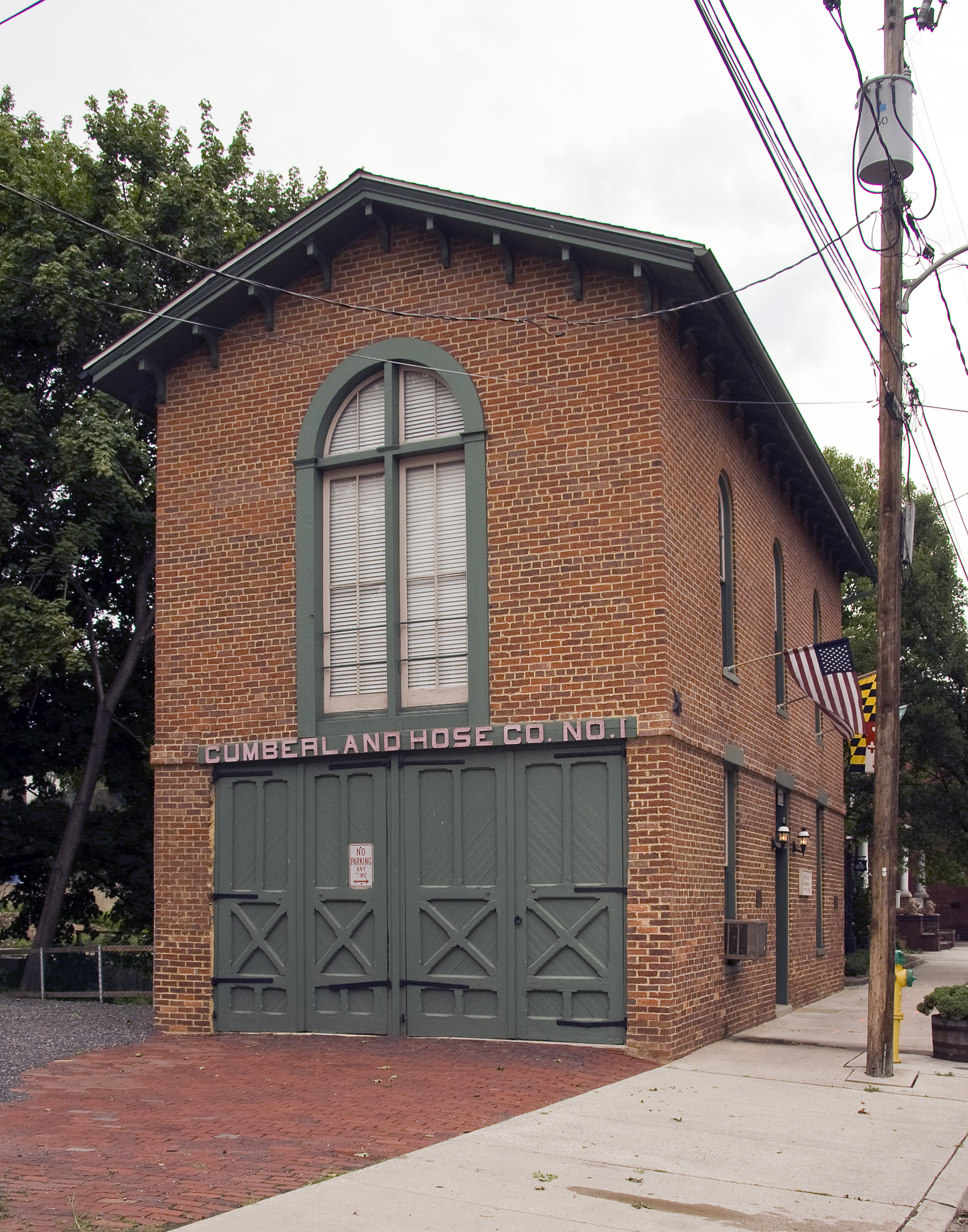
- Canada Hose Company Building, August 2010

- Location within Maryland Location within the United States
- Location: 400-402 N. Mechanic St., Cumberland, Maryland
- Coordinates: 39°39′21.23″N 78°46′04.37″W
- Area: 0.2 acres (0.081 ha)
- Built: 1845
- NRHP reference No.: 79003257
- Added to NRHP: September 21, 1979

The Canada Hose Company Building is a historic firehouse in Cumberland, Allegany County, Maryland, United States. It is a two-story gable-front brick structure. Above the doors used for the fire engines is a sign which reads "Cumberland Hose Co. No. 1." The building is the oldest of a number of old firehouses built in Cumberland during the 19th century; it was completed in 1845.

The Canada Hose Company Building was listed on the National Register of Historic Places in 1979.

== History ==
The Canada Hose Company Building was built after a major fire in Cumberland, which destroyed over 70 buildings in the area. Though Cumberland had a fire company prior, it was only after the fire that they built the building and upgraded the equipment. Before the fire, the company had been meeting in a shed.
