= Lonaconing, Maryland =

Lonaconing
- Town
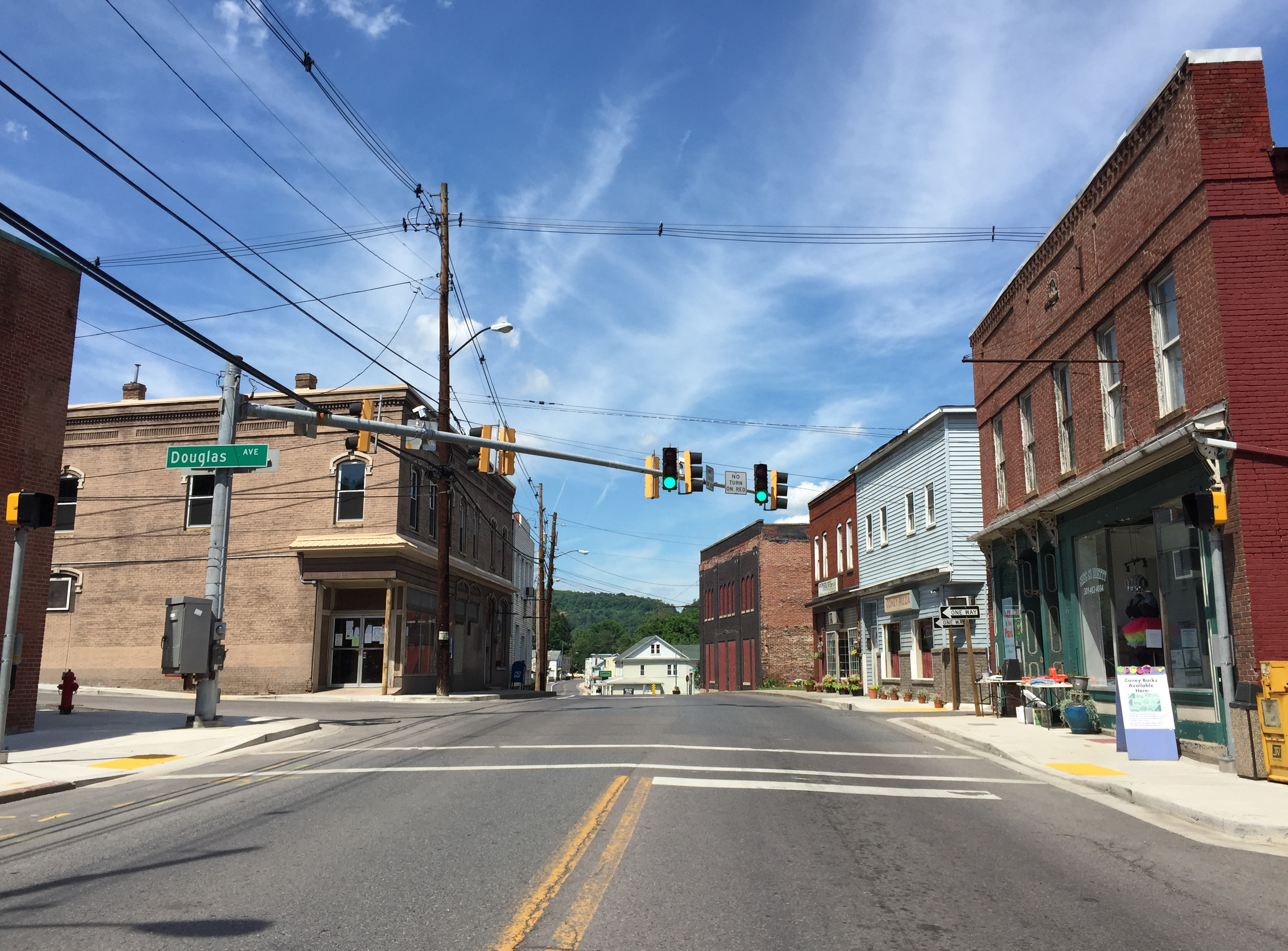
- Central Lonaconing along MD 36

- Seal

- Location of Lonaconing, Maryland

- Location within Maryland Location within the United States
- Coordinates: 39°33′57″N 78°58′44″W
- Country: United States
- State: Maryland
- County: Allegany
- Incorporated: 1890

Area
  - Total: 0.36 sq mi (0.94 km^{2})
  - Land: 0.36 sq mi (0.94 km^{2})
  - Water: 0 sq mi (0.00 km^{2})
- Elevation: 1,499 ft (457 m)

Population (2020)
  - Total: 1,001
  - Density: 2,765.8/sq mi (1,067.89/km^{2})
- Time zone: UTC-5 (Eastern (EST))
  - Summer (DST): UTC-4 (EDT)
- ZIP code: 21539
- Area codes: 301, 240
- FIPS code: 24-47875
- GNIS feature ID: 2391273
- Website: https://townoflonaconing.org/

Lonaconing is a town in Allegany County, Maryland, United States, located along the Georges Creek Valley. It is part of the Cumberland, MD-WV Metropolitan Statistical Area. As of the 2020 census, Lonaconing had a population of 1,001.

== History ==
The first non-Native American settlers in the late 18th century were explorers, hunters and farmers. Surnames of some of the first settlers were Dye, Duckworth, Green, Grindle, Fazenbaker, Grove, VanBuskirk, Knapp, and Miller. The first stone house, built in 1790, in Knapps Meadow, just north of Lonaconing, was owned by Samuel VanBuskirk. The house still stands and is a private residence as of 2016. The Lonaconing Historic District was listed on the National Register of Historic Places in 1983.

Lonaconing is the birthplace of Bishop John Gardner Murray (1857–1929), and Baseball Hall of Fame pitcher Robert Moses ("Lefty") Grove (1900–1975). John Gardner Murray was the sixteenth presiding bishop of the Episcopal Church, and the first elected to the position rather than succeeding to it automatically as the oldest bishop when his predecessor died. Lefty Grove played notably for the old Baltimore Orioles, 1920–1925, during their famous string of six straight championships in the "Triple A" (AAA) minor league level of the International League, and later for Connie Mack's Philadelphia Athletics, (1925–1933) and the Boston Red Sox, 1934–1941, of the American League. Grove's "Most Valuable Player" Award is the only one not on display at the National Baseball Hall of Fame in Cooperstown, New York, as it is displayed at the George's Creek Library of the Western Maryland Regional Library system.

On January 20, 2021, the fourth largest Powerball and sixth largest lottery jackpot ticket in U.S. history was sold at Coney Market, a convenience store in Lonaconing, to an anonymous winner.

=== Lonaconing glassware manufacturers ===
- 1914–1915: Dugan Glass
- 1914–1918: Lonaconing Glass
- 1919–1929: Utility Glass Works
- 1930–1934: Sloan Bros Glass Company

=== Early mining railroads ===
Iron and coal companies in Lonaconing built railroads in the 1840s, in anticipation of connecting with the Baltimore and Ohio Railroad (B&O) and the Chesapeake and Ohio Canal. Some of these mining companies owned and operated their own railroad equipment. The Georges Creek Rail Road was built south from Lonaconing to connect with the Baltimore & Ohio at Piedmont(WV) All of the rail lines were absorbed into the Cumberland and Pennsylvania Railroad (C&P) by 1870.

=== The Lonaconing Furnace (1836–1855) ===
The Georges Creek Coal and Iron Company constructed and operated a blast furnace in Lonaconing from 1836 to 1855 along with constructing and operating the related Georges Creek Railroad from 1851 to 1863. The Lonaconing Furnace was listed on the National Register of Historic Places in 1973.

== Demographics ==
Historical population
Census	Pop.	Note	%±
1900	2,181		—
1910	1,553		−28.8%
1920	2,054		32.3%
1930	2,426		18.1%
1940	2,429		0.1%
1950	2,289		−5.8%
1960	2,007		−12.3%
1970	1,572		−21.7%
1980	1,420		−9.7%
1990	1,122		−21.0%
2000	1,205		7.4%
2010	1,214		0.7%
2020	1,001		−17.5%
U.S. Decennial Census

=== 2010 census ===
As of the census of 2010, there were 1,214 people, 463 households, and 303 families living in the town. The population density was 2,961.0 inhabitants per square mile (1,143.2/km^{2}). There were 525 housing units at an average density of 1,280.5 per square mile (494.4/km^{2}). The racial makeup of the town was 98.1% White, 0.3% African American, 0.2% Asian, and 1.4% from two or more races. Hispanic or Latino of any race were 0.5% of the population.

There were 463 households, of which 30.9% had children under the age of 18 living with them, 47.3% were married couples living together, 13.4% had a female householder with no husband present, 4.8% had a male householder with no wife present, and 34.6% were non-families. 31.1% of all households were made up of individuals, and 15.6% had someone living alone who was 65 years of age or older. The average household size was 2.48 and the average family size was 3.08.

The median age in the town was 40.5 years. 23.8% of residents were under the age of 18; 8.3% were between the ages of 18 and 24; 24.3% were from 25 to 44; 22.9% were from 45 to 64; and 20.5% were 65 years of age or older. The gender makeup of the town was 47.2% male and 52.8% female.

=== 2000 census ===
As of the census of 2000, there were 1,205 people, 482 households, and 290 families living in the town. The population density was 2,875.8 inhabitants per square mile (1,110.4/km^{2}). There were 559 housing units at an average density of 1,334.1 per square mile (515.1/km^{2}). The racial makeup of the town was 98.67% White, 0.66% African American, 0.08% Pacific Islander, 0.08% from other races, and 0.50% from two or more races. Hispanic or Latino of any race were 0.50% of the population. At 16.1 percent Scottish, Lonaconing is the most Scottish town in the United States.

There were 482 households, out of which 28.0% had children under the age of 18 living with them, 46.9% were married couples living together, 10.0% had a female householder with no husband present, and 39.8% were non-families. 36.1% of all households were made up of individuals, and 21.8% had someone living alone who was 65 years of age or older. The average household size was 2.37 and the average family size was 3.15.

In the town, the population was spread out, with 23.9% under the age of 18, 8.1% from 18 to 24, 25.9% from 25 to 44, 19.5% from 45 to 64, and 22.6% who were 65 years of age or older. The median age was 38 years. For every 100 females, there were 83.7 males. For every 100 females age 18 and over, there were 75.0 males.

The median income for a household in the town was $27,434, and the median income for a family was $37,083. Males had a median income of $27,315 versus $19,423 for females. The per capita income for the town was $13,890. About 12.8% of families and 19.6% of the population were below the poverty line, including 30.3% of those under age 18 and 17.7% of those age 65 or over.

== Geography ==
According to the United States Census Bureau, the town has a total area of 0.41 square miles (1.06 km^{2}), all land.

== Schools ==
Lonaconing has been home to several different schools over the past century.

At one time, two high schools existed within the town, with Central School being located in front of the long-abandoned Iron Furnace from 1896 to 1973 and Valley High School being located between Lonaconing and the unincorporated community of Detmold, Maryland. Central High School was razed in 1973 and the former site is now host to a community park and playground. Valley High School opened in 1953 and remained opened for more than 40 years before consolidating with Bruce High School from Westernport to form Westmar High School. Bruce High School then became Westmar Middle School, but after Westmar High School closed around 1996, the middle school building closed and relocated to where Westmar Middle School is located today. Following Westmar High School's closure and the closing of nearby Beall High School, Mountain Ridge High School in Frostburg was established to serve the student population from the two shuttered schools.

Georges Creek Elementary was opened in 1975 with the closing of Central School and continues to serve the George's Creek community today. It combined populations with Barton Elementary in 2000. Today, the school hosts around 270 students, serving children from pre-kindergarten to 5th grade.

== Transportation ==
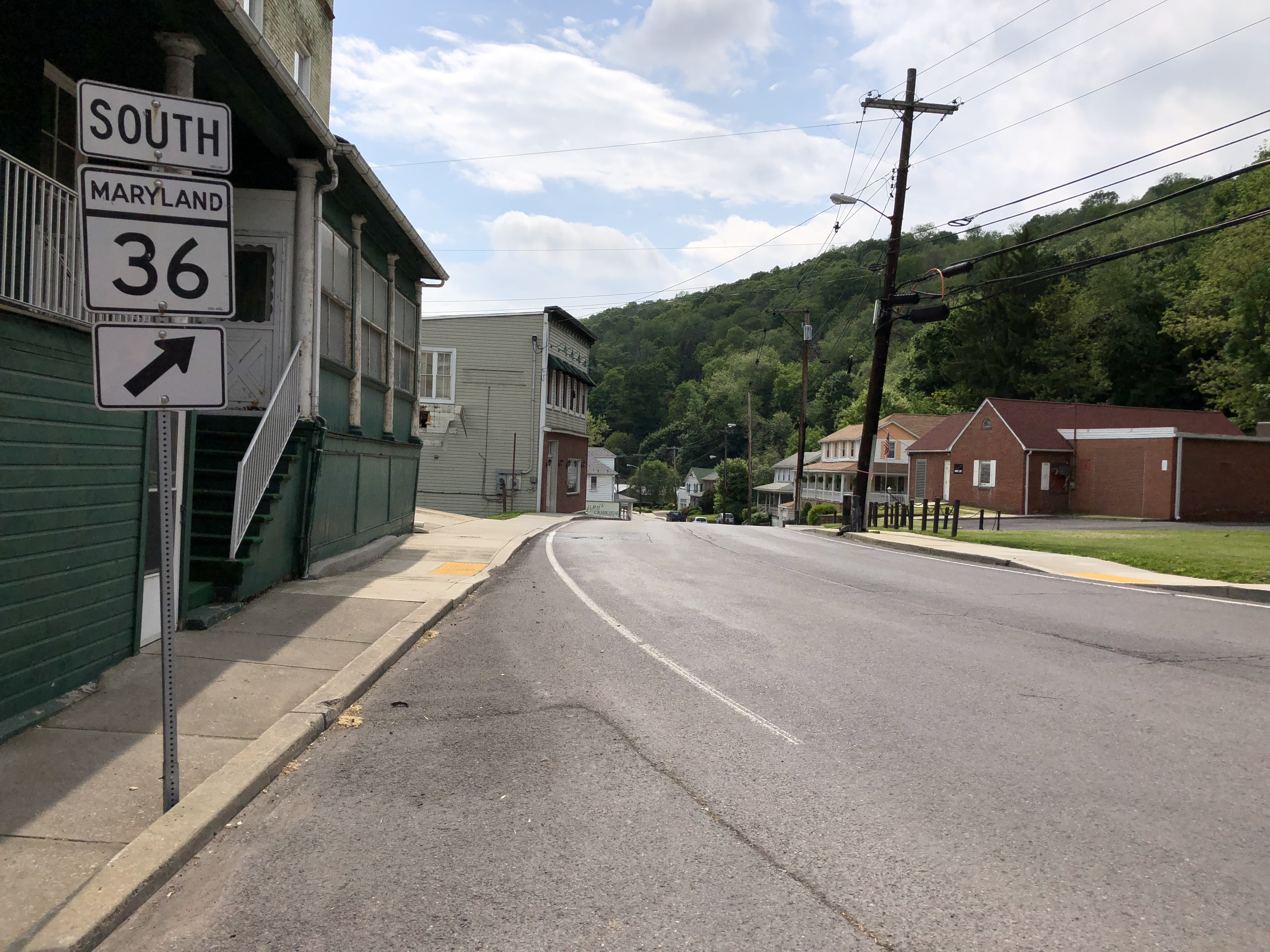
MD 36 southbound in Lonaconing

The main method of travel to and from Lonaconing is by road. The only significant highway serving the town is Maryland Route 36, which also serves as Main Street. MD 36 heads northward towards Frostburg and Interstate 68, while to the south, it terminates at the town of Westernport.

== Notable persons ==
- Bishop John Gardner Murray (1857–1929), Episcopal Bishop of Maryland (1911–1929) and the sixteenth Presiding Bishop of the Episcopal Church (1926–1929). He was the first person elected to the position rather than succeeding to it automatically as the oldest bishop when his predecessor died.
- Robert Moses (Lefty) Grove (1900–1975), professional baseball pitcher, member of the National Baseball Hall of Fame whose 1941 American League MVP award is housed at the George's Creek Library in town.

== See also ==
- Big Savage Mountain
