= 200–208 Decatur Street =

Historic house in Maryland

- U.S. National Register of Historic Places
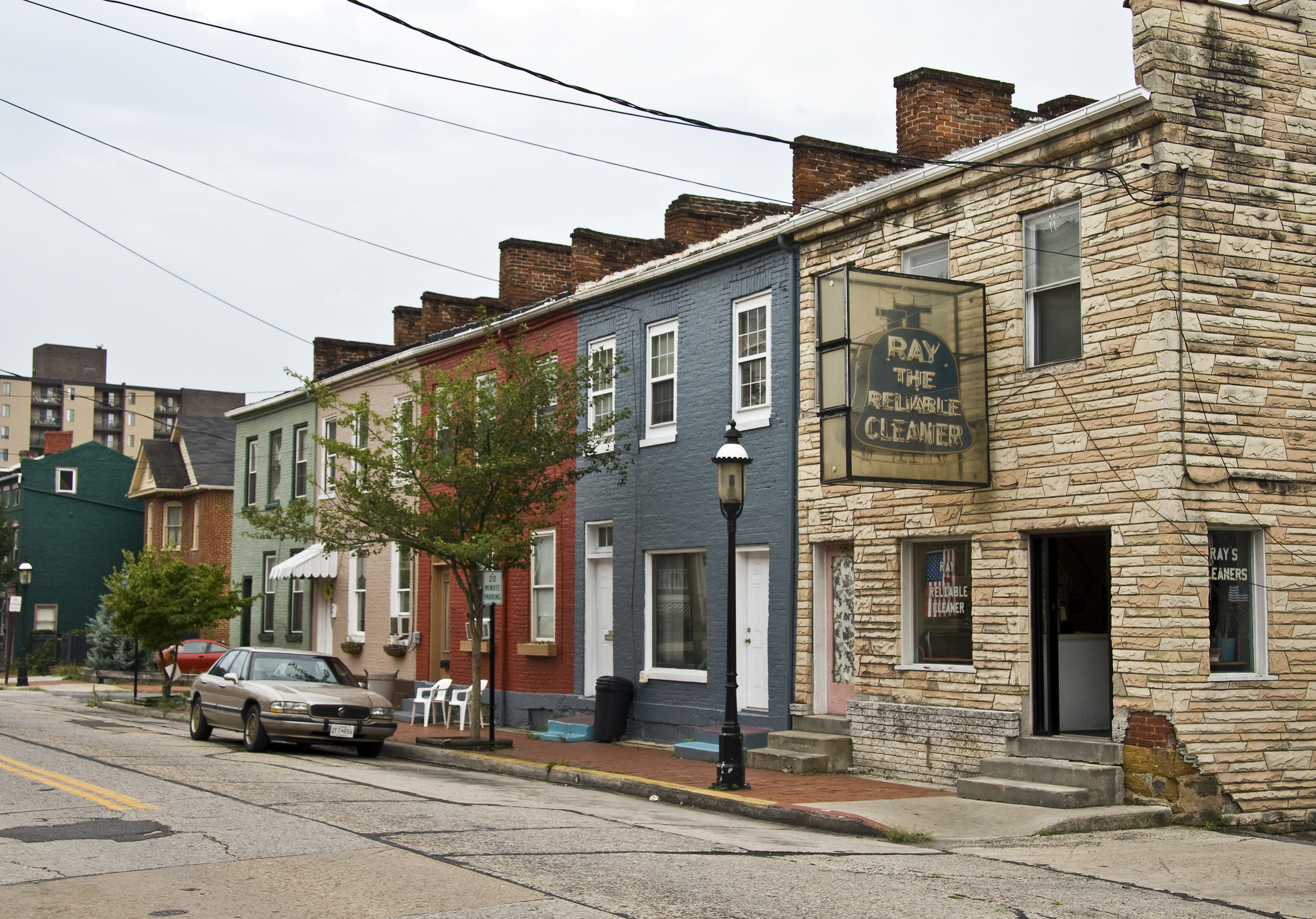

- Location within Maryland Location within the United States
- Location: Cumberland, Maryland
- Coordinates: 39°39′17.64″N 78°45′31.07″W
- Built: 1830
- NRHP reference No.: 75000859
- Added to NRHP: July 7, 1975

200, 202, 204, 206 and 208 Decatur Street are adjoining rowhouses in Cumberland, Allegany County, Maryland. The houses were built in the 1840s or early 1850s. The houses are of a type that, while common elsewhere in Maryland, were not extensively built in Cumberland, in which individual and semi-detached houses were more common. The houses exhibit plain but consistent detailing of a neoclassical nature.
