= Decatur Heights Historic District =

Historic district in Maryland, United States

- U.S. National Register of Historic Places
- U.S. Historic district
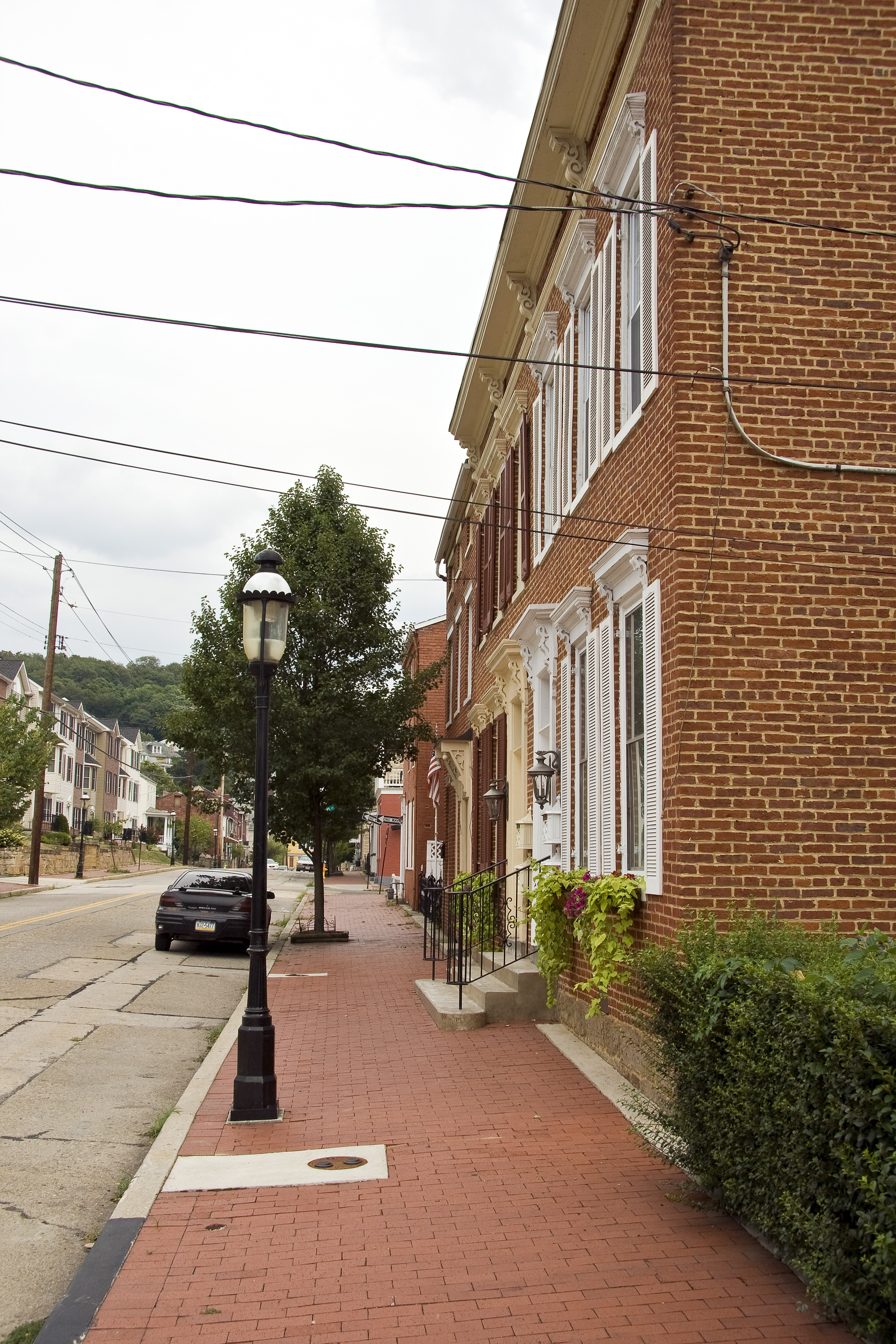

- Location within Maryland Location within the United States
- Location: Roughly along Baltimore Ave., Decatur St., Davidson St., Frederick St. and Linden St., Cumberland, Maryland
- Coordinates: 39°39′29″N 78°45′22″W
- Area: 77 acres (31 ha)
- Architect: Butler, Wright; Biddle, T.W.
- Architectural style: Federal, Greek Revival
- NRHP reference No.: 05001478
- Added to NRHP: December 28, 2005

The Decatur Heights Historic District is a national historic district in Cumberland, Allegany County, Maryland. It is a mixed-use district of 77 acres (310,000 m^{2}) located on the northeast side of Cumberland. It contains a total of 377 residential / commercial / industrial historic resources, including five properties previously listed on the National Register of Historic Places. Approximately 50 percent of the resources in the district predate 1890, approximately 40 percent were constructed between 1890 and 1930, and the remaining approximately 10 percent post-date 1930. It is significant because: 1) its association with the history of African-American education in Cumberland; 2) its association with the exploration and settlement of the region, with its location along the National Road; and 3) the dense concentration of primarily residential buildings built between about 1820 and the 1940s.

It was listed on the National Register of Historic Places in 2005.
