= Lonaconing Historic District =

Historic district in Maryland, United States

- U.S. National Register of Historic Places
- U.S. Historic district
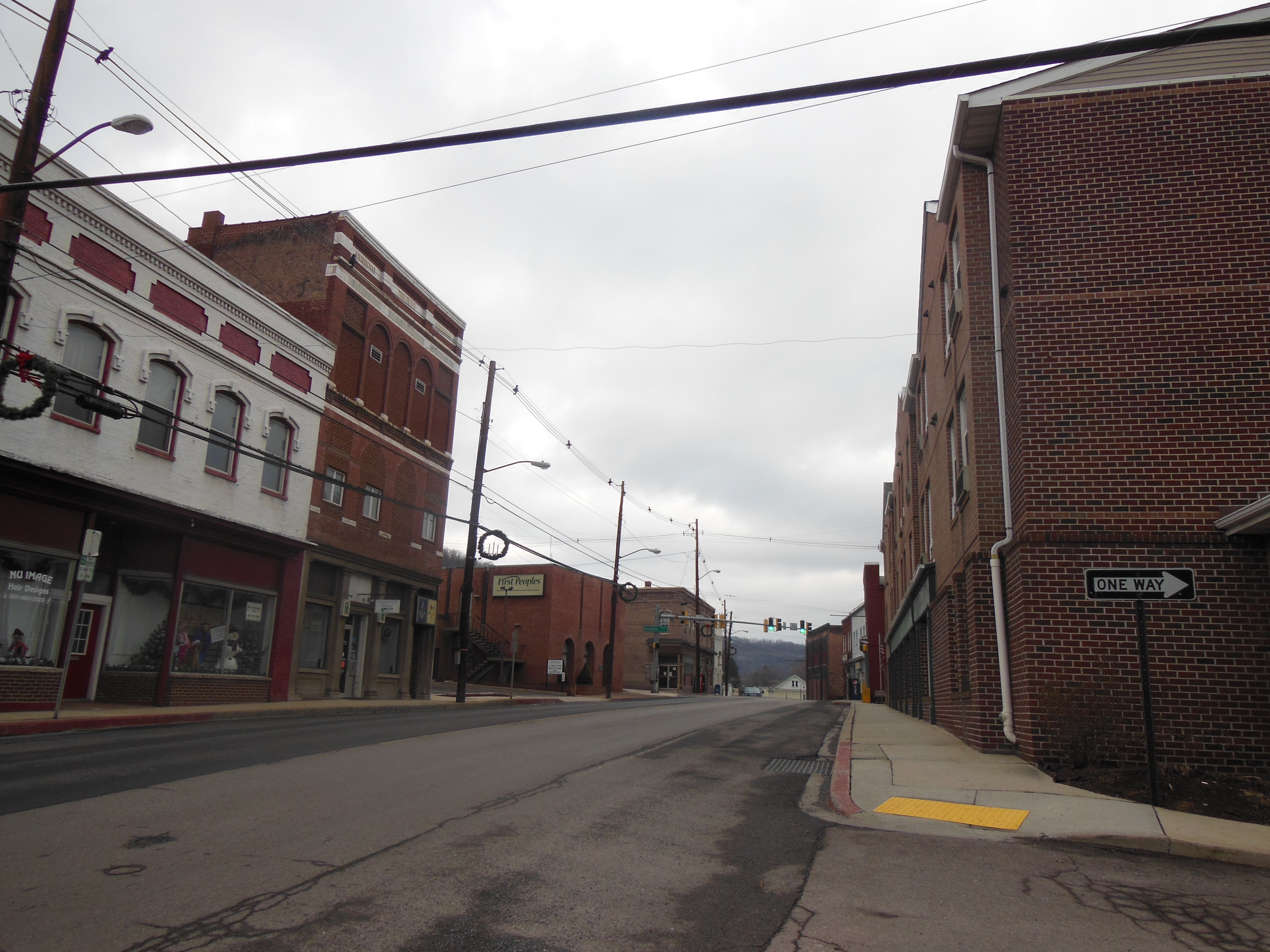
- Looking north on MD 36 (Main St.) towards Douglas Ave.

- Location within Maryland Location within the United States
- Location: MD 36, MD 657, and Douglas Ave., Church, E. Main and Railroad Sts., Lonaconing, Maryland
- Coordinates: 39°34′11″N 78°58′45″W
- Area: 125 acres (51 ha)
- Architectural style: Early Commercial, Late Victorian
- NRHP reference No.: 83002919
- Added to NRHP: September 15, 1983

The Lonaconing Historic District is a national historic district in Lonaconing, Allegany County, Maryland. It comprises 278 buildings and structures consisting of a variety of 19th and early-20th century commercial, industrial, and residential buildings. These structures identify with the development of Lonaconing as a center of the iron, coal, and silk industries in the George's Creek Valley of Western Maryland. It includes a group of 40 late-19th and early-20th century brick or frame commercial structures, including a hotel, bank, three dry goods stores, and numerous other shops and warehouses, mostly constructed after a fire which devastated downtown in 1881.

It was listed on the National Register of Historic Places in 1983.

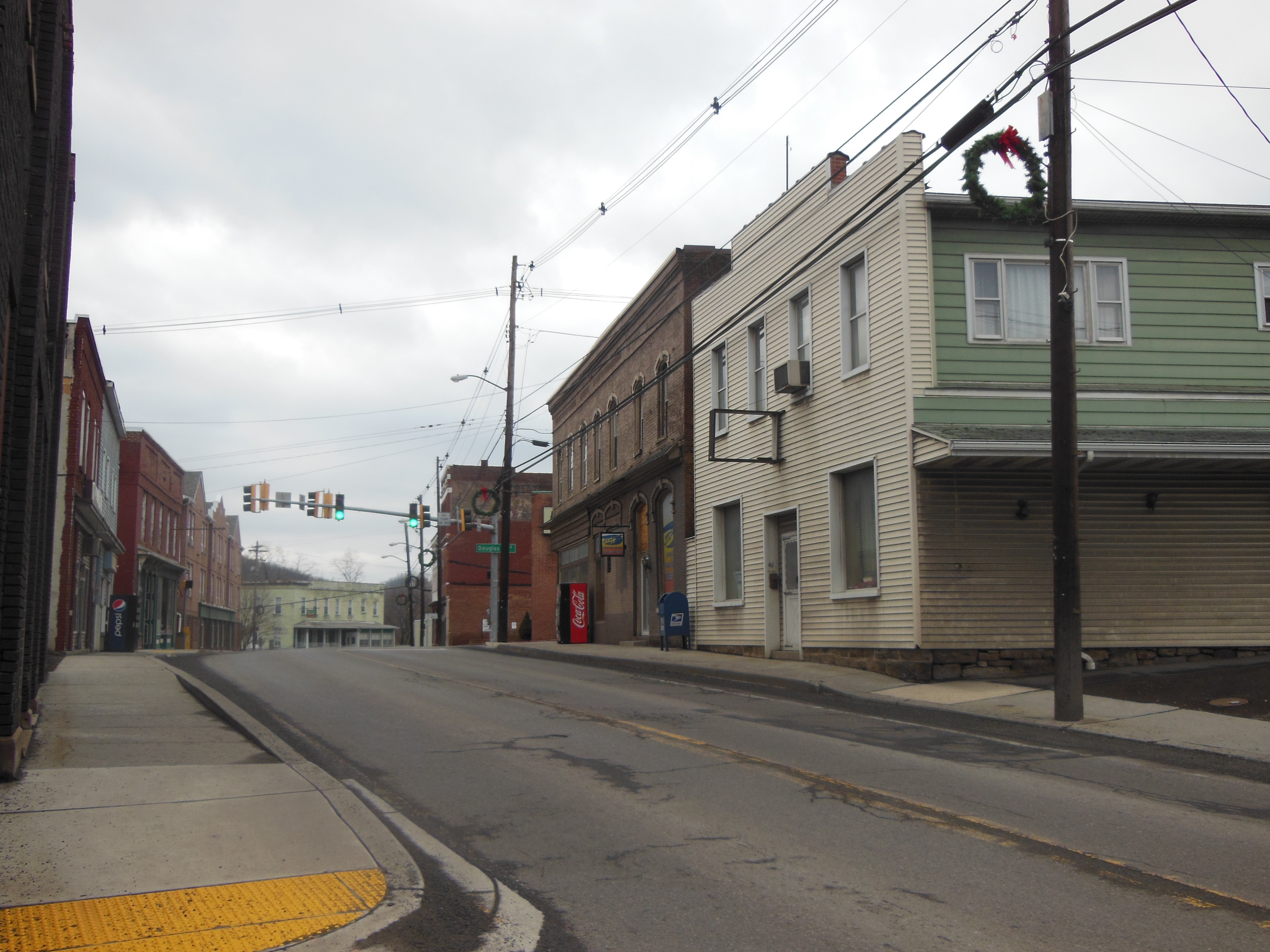
Looking south on MD 36
