= Lonaconing Furnace =

- U.S. National Register of Historic Places
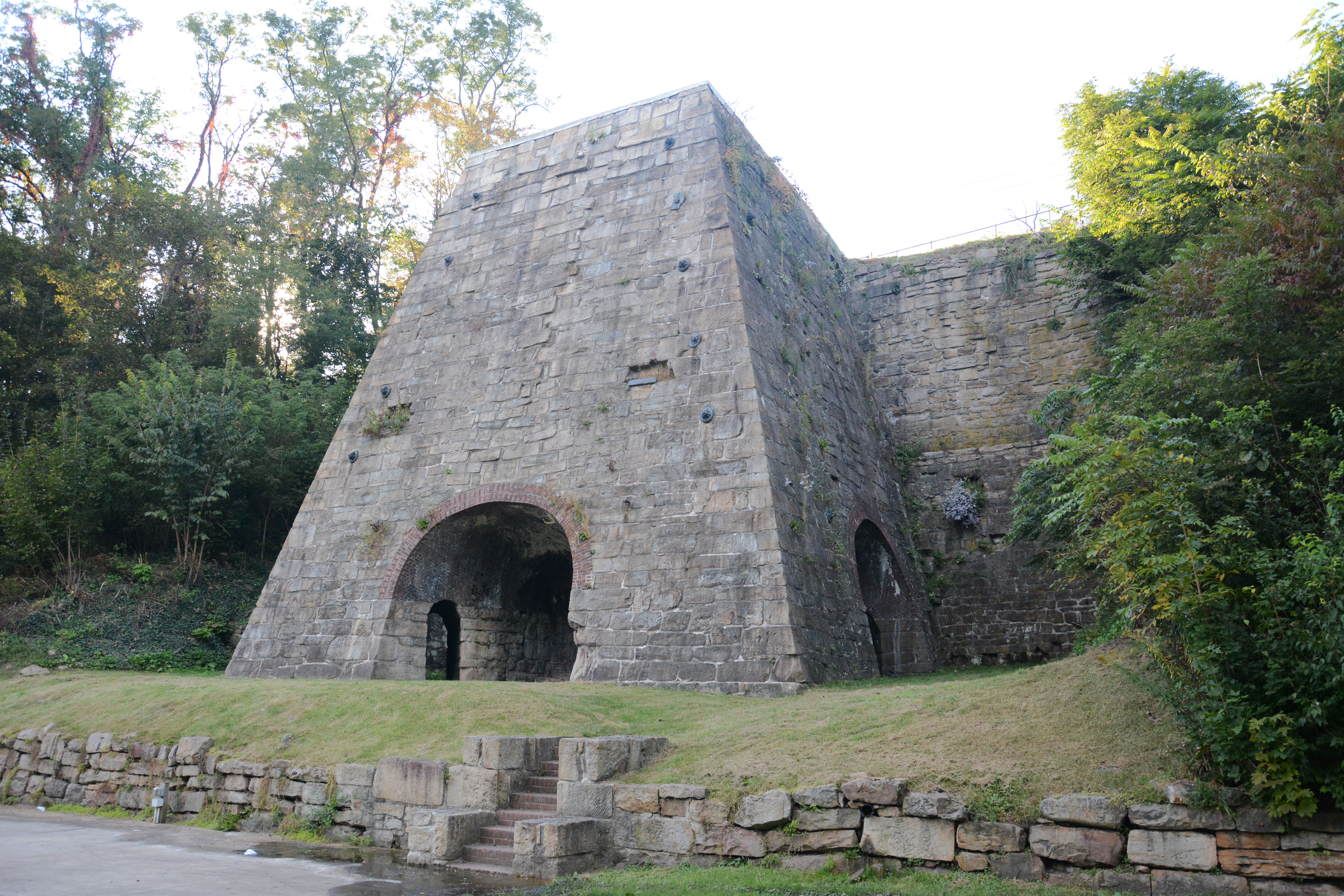
- Lonaconing Furnace, as seen in September, 2013.

- Location within Maryland Location within the United States
- Location: E. Main St., Lonaconing, Maryland
- Coordinates: 39°34′13″N 78°58′41″W
- Area: 0.5 acres (0.20 ha)
- Built: 1836
- Built by: Harris, J.N.
- NRHP reference No.: 73000886
- Added to NRHP: June 19, 1973

Lonaconing Furnace, also known as The George's Creek Coal and Iron Company Furnace No. 1, is a historic iron furnace in Lonaconing, Allegany County, Maryland, United States. It is a truncated square pyramid constructed of sandstone, 50 feet (15 m) high, 50 feet square at the base, and 25 feet square at the top. It first produced iron in 1839, then the iron operation was abandoned in the mid-1850s, the Loncaconing Furnace complex included a top house, molding house, engine house, and two hot-air furnaces for heating the blast. None of these ancillary structures remains. It played a significant role in demonstrating that both coke and raw bituminous coal could be used as fuels in the manufacture of iron. It is known as "the first coke furnace, whose operation was successful, erected in this country."

Lonaconing Furnace was listed on the National Register of Historic Places in 1973.
