= 16 Altamont Terrace =

Historic house in Maryland

- U.S. National Register of Historic Places
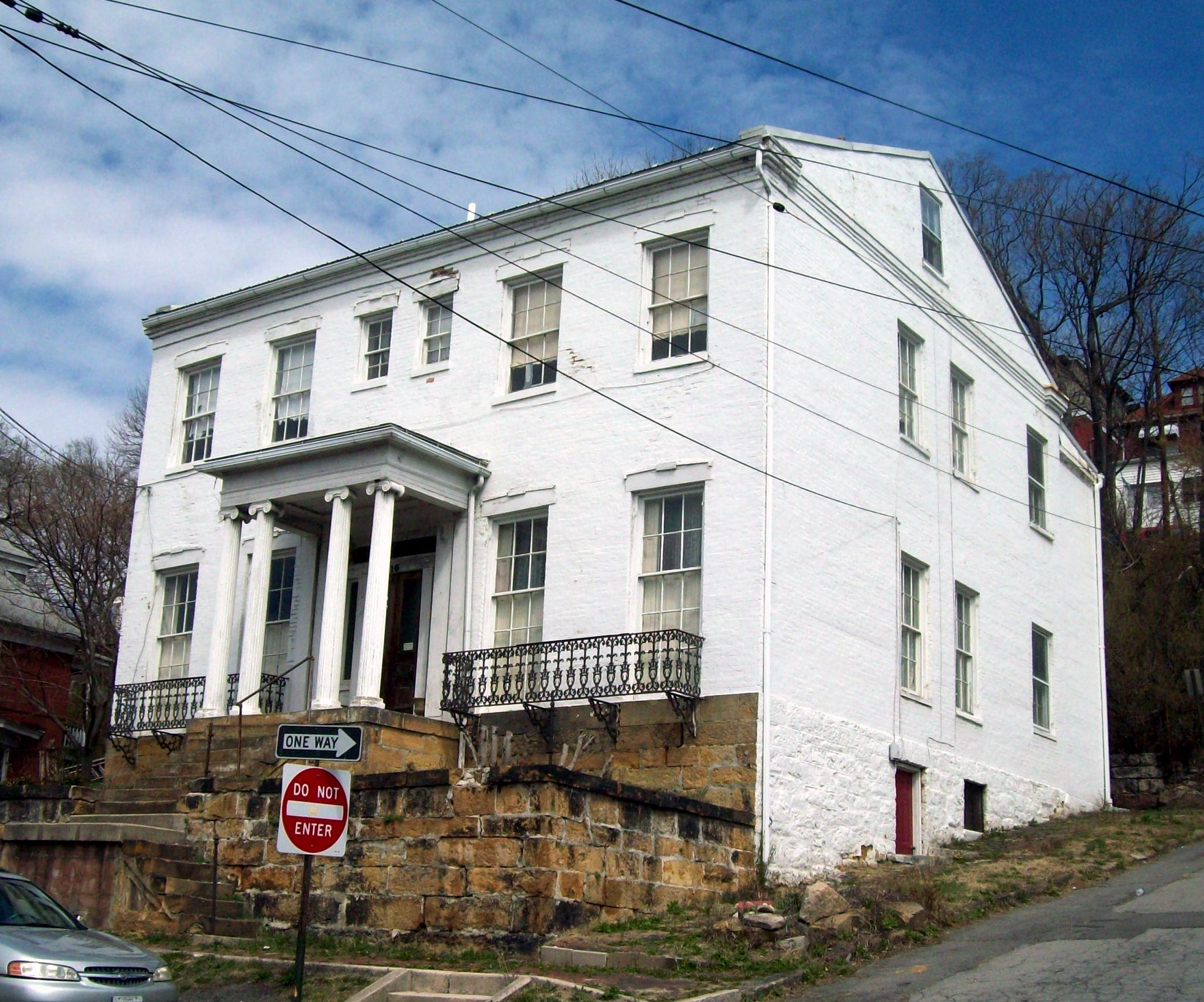
- 16 Altamont Terrace, March 2011

- Location within Maryland Location within the United States
- Location: NE corner of Altamont Ter. and Union St., Cumberland, Maryland
- Coordinates: 39°39′7″N 78°45′23″W
- Area: 0.2 acres (0.081 ha)
- Built: 1851
- Architectural style: Greek Revival
- NRHP reference No.: 75000858
- Added to NRHP: July 7, 1975

16 Altamont Terrace is a historic home in Cumberland, Allegany County, Maryland, United States. Built circa 1851, it is an example of Greek Revival architecture, with an Ionic portico above a stone foundation and cast iron balconies. The house served as the Allegany County hospital from 1889 to 1890. The building was converted into apartments in about 1905.

16 Altamont Terrace was listed on the National Register of Historic Places in 1975.
