= Mount Savage Historic District =

Historic district in Maryland, United States

- U.S. National Register of Historic Places
- U.S. Historic district
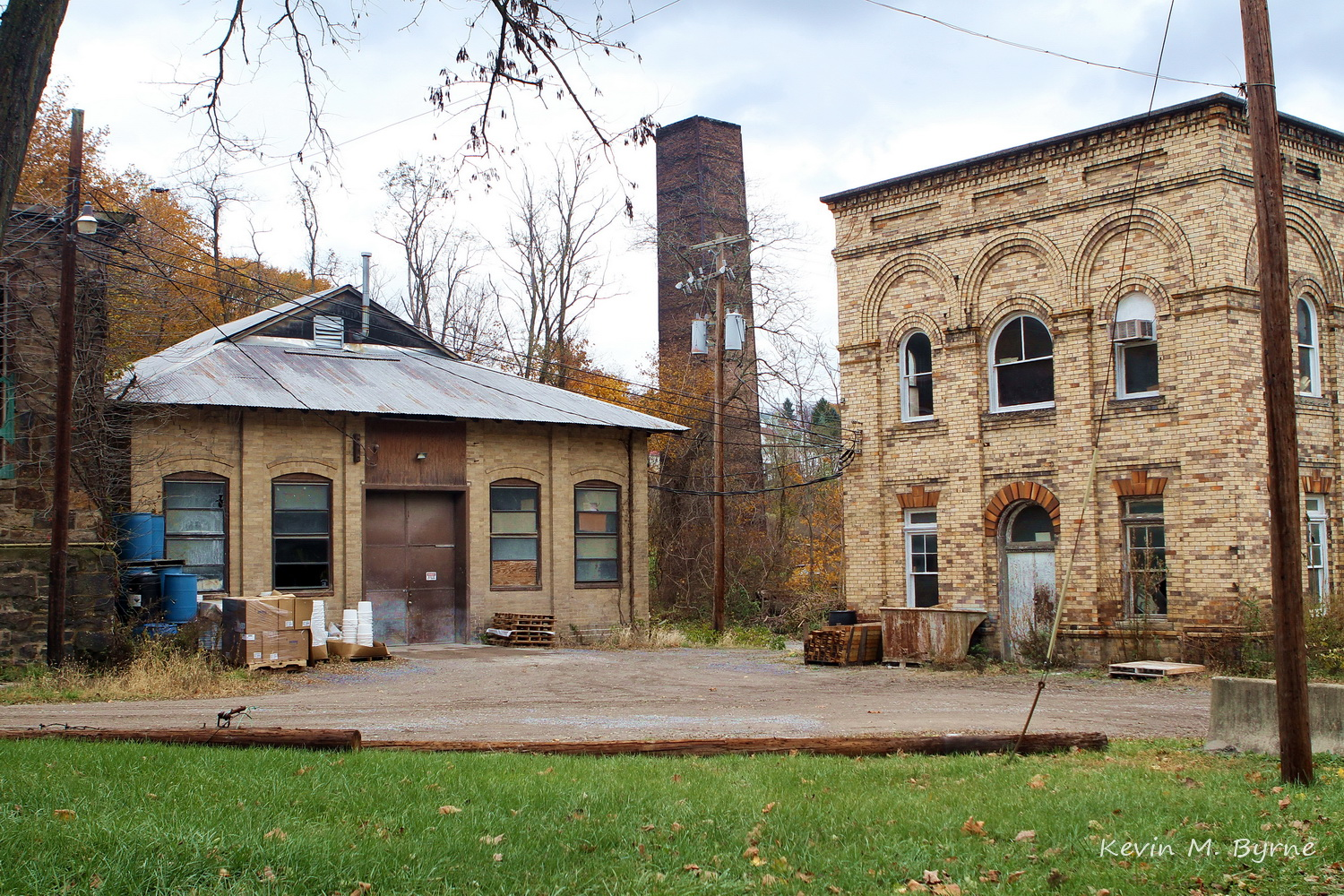

- Location within Maryland Location within the United States
- Location: Roughly bounded by Foundry Row, Jennings Run, New School Rd., Yellow Row, Cherry St., and Columbia Ave., Mount Savage, Maryland
- Coordinates: 39°41′47″N 78°52′49″W
- Area: 100 acres (40 ha)
- Built: 1830
- Architectural style: Bungalow/craftsman, Queen Anne, Commercial Influence
- NRHP reference No.: 83004213
- Added to NRHP: September 8, 1983

The Mount Savage Historic District is a national historic district in Mount Savage, Allegany County, Maryland. It comprises 189 19th and 20th century buildings, structures, and sites within this industrial community northwest of Cumberland. The structures reflect the community's development as a center of the iron, coal, brick, and railroad industries from the 1830s to the early 20th century. Included are a set of vertical-board duplexes on Old Row built about 1840, and possibly the earliest examples of workers' housing remaining in the region.

It was listed on the National Register of Historic Places in 1983.

== See also ==
- Mount Savage Iron Works
- Mount Savage Locomotive Works
- Mount Savage Railroad
