= Bell Tower Building =

Historic building in Maryland, USA

- U.S. National Register of Historic Places
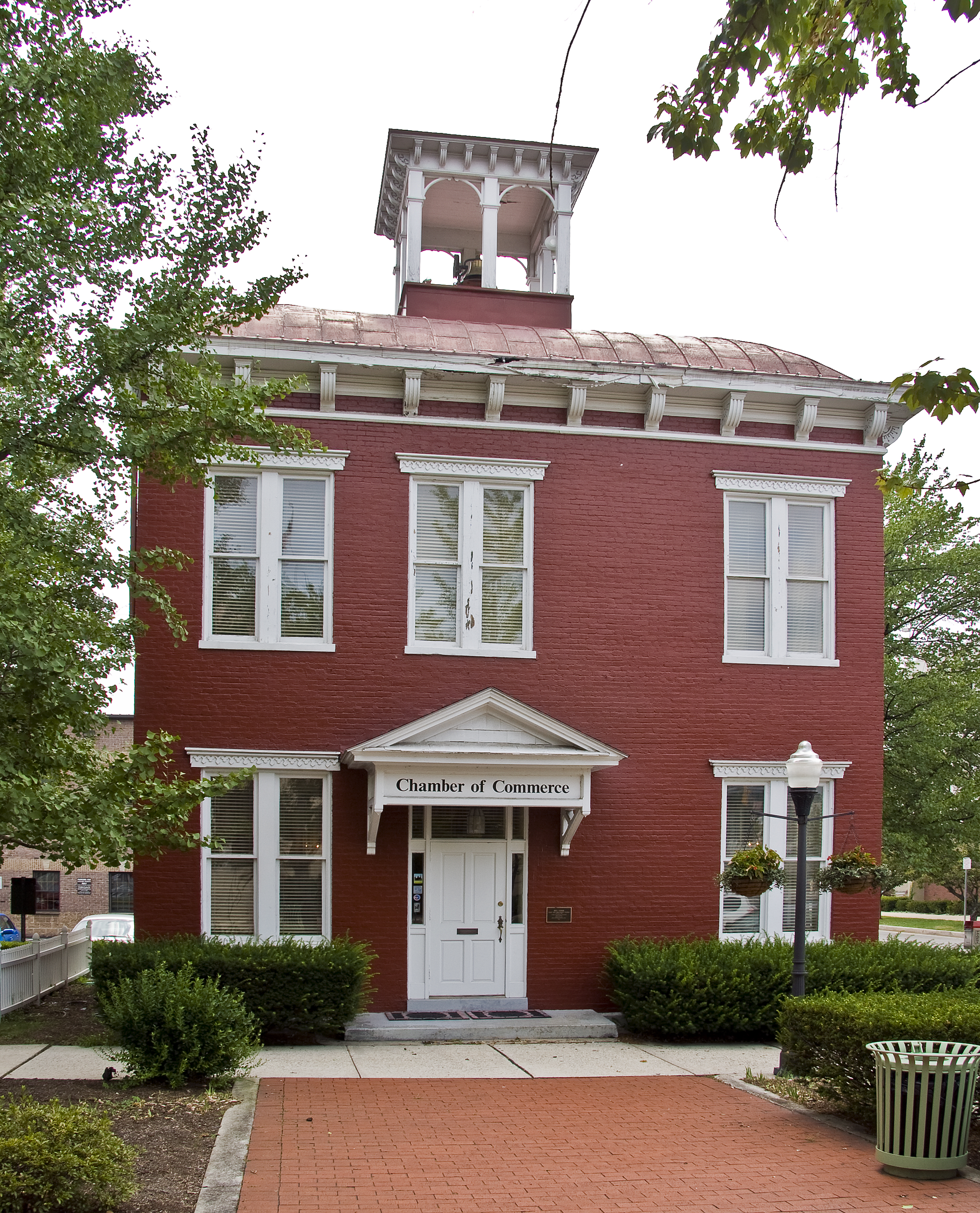

- Location within Maryland Location within the United States
- Location: Bedford and Liberty Sts., Cumberland, Maryland
- Coordinates: 39°39′09.65″N 78°45′47.06″W
- Built: 1887
- NRHP reference No.: 73000881
- Added to NRHP: February 20, 1973

Bell Tower Building, or the Allegany County League for Crippled Children building, is a historic building in Cumberland, Allegany County, Maryland, United States. It was built in 1887 and is a two-story brick structure topped by a small wooden tower with an open belfry. This was the first separate building to be used as police headquarters and jail in Cumberland.

It was listed on the National Register of Historic Places in 1973.
