= Rolling Mill Historic District =

Historic district in Maryland, United States

- U.S. National Register of Historic Places
- U.S. Historic district
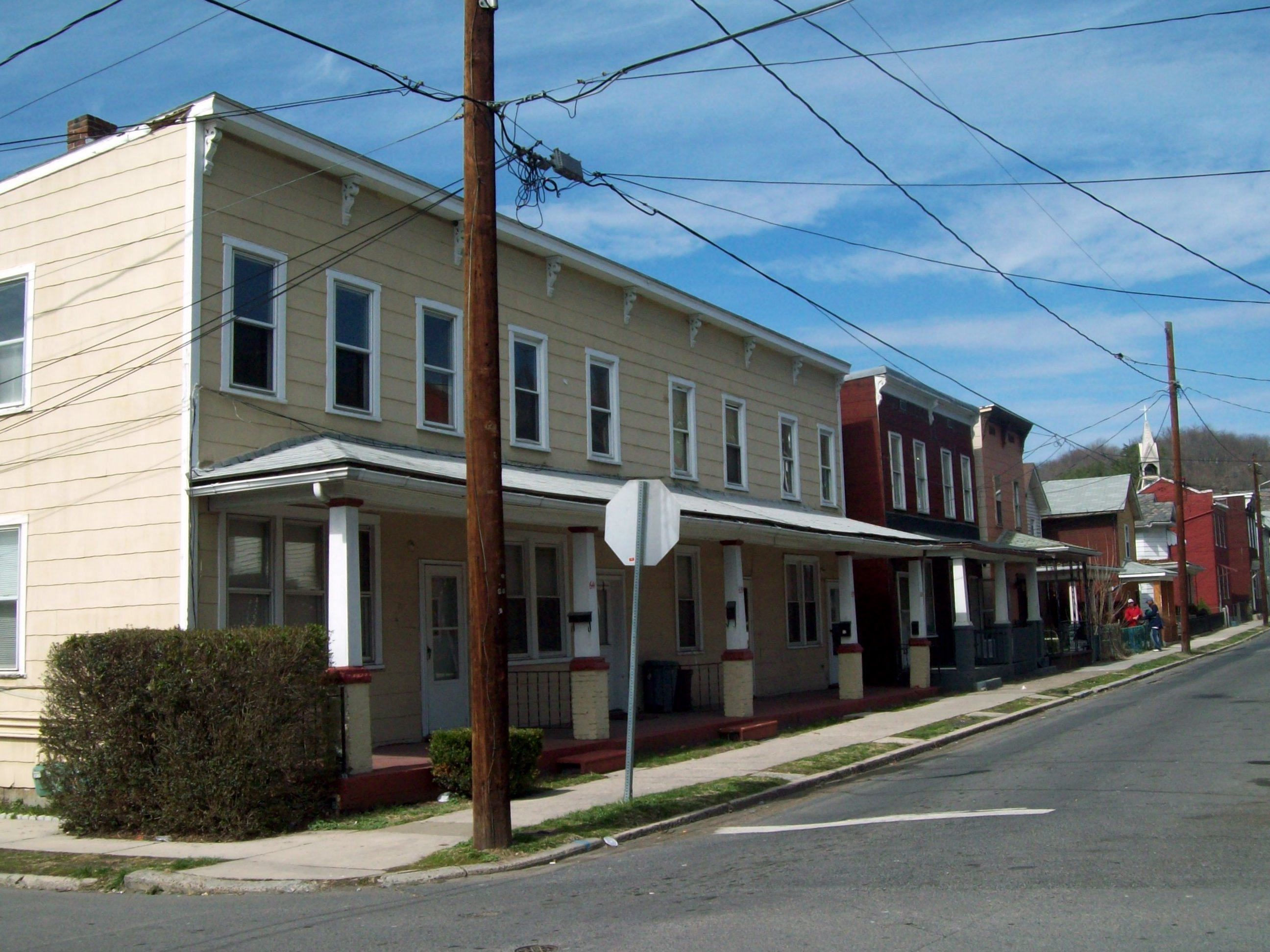
- Rolling Mill Historic District, March 2011

- Location within Maryland Location within the United States
- Location: Portions of Williams, Elm, Spring, Short, Baker, and Ascension Sts., Miltenberger Pl., Sheridan Pl., Maryland Ave, Cumberland, Maryland
- Coordinates: 39°38′46.24″N 78°45′20.48″W
- Area: 38 acres (15 ha)
- Architect: Rizer, Ralph; et al.
- Architectural style: Late Victorian, Colonial Revival
- NRHP reference No.: 08001215
- Added to NRHP: December 24, 2008

Rolling Mill Historic District is a national historic district located at Cumberland, Allegany County, Maryland. It is a 38-acre (15 ha) primarily residential historic district located on the east side of the city of Cumberland. It contains a strong, locally distinctive concentration of wood and brick residences built between the early 1870s and the late 1940s. It also includes a modest commercial area. The district has a total of 173 properties, including the previously listed Francis Haley House.

It was listed on the National Register of Historic Places in 2008.
