= Phoenix Mill Farm =

Historic house in Maryland, United States

- U.S. National Register of Historic Places
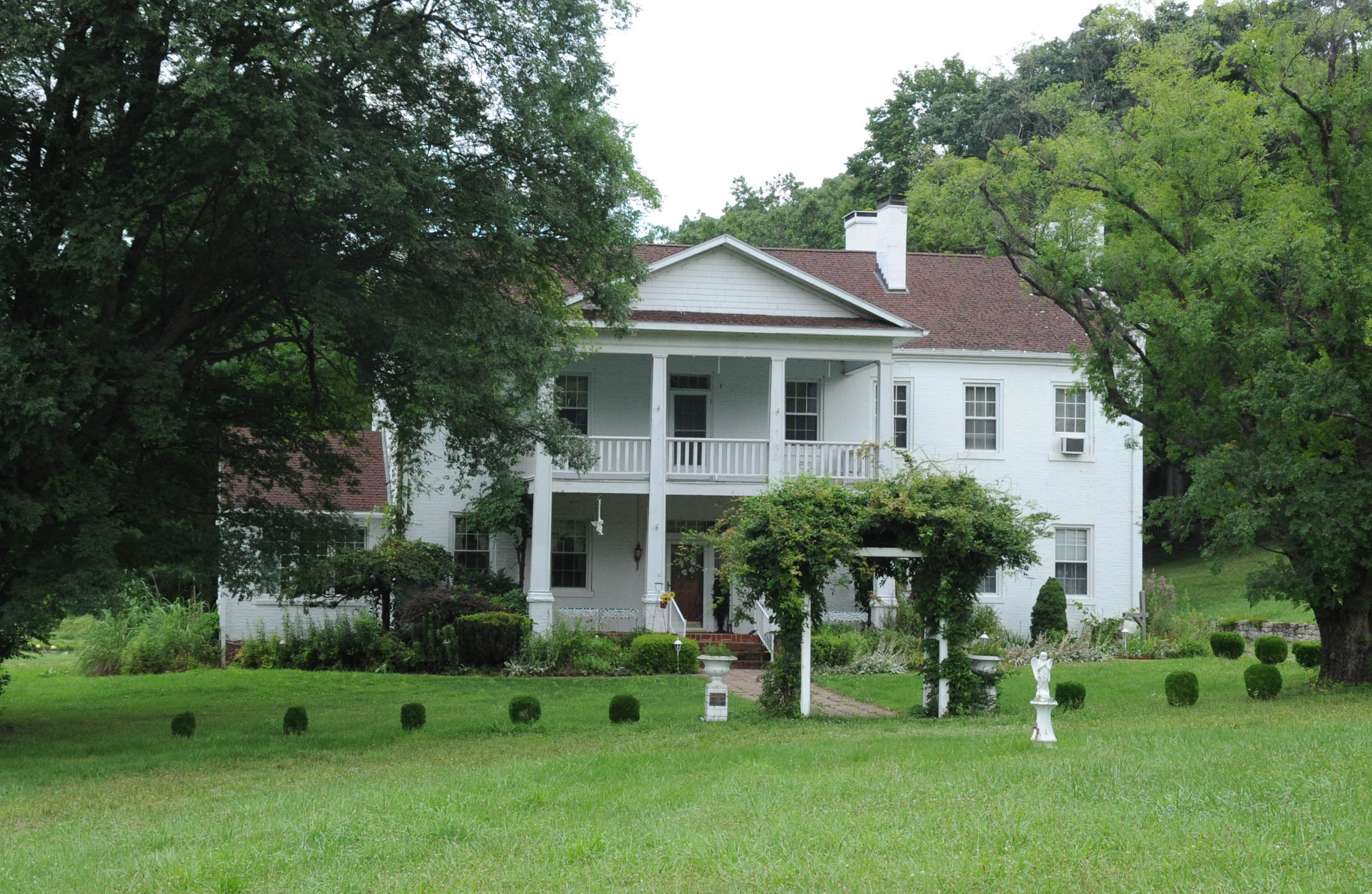

- Location within Maryland Location within the United States
- Location: Smouses Mill Road, Dickens, Maryland
- Coordinates: 39°42′37.2″N 78°41′36.2″W
- Area: 20 acres (8.1 ha)
- Built: 1845
- Architectural style: Greek Revival
- NRHP reference No.: 77000681
- Added to NRHP: August 12, 1977

Phoenix Mill Farm, historically known as Mill Run Farm, is a historic home located in Dickens, Allegany County, Maryland, United States. It is a 2 1/2-story Flemish bond brick structure showing Greek Revival style influences built about 1845. It has a gable roof and double flush chimneys. On the property is the site of Smouse Mill. The home was erected for John Jacob Smouse, who operated the mill.

The Phoenix Mill Farm was listed on the National Register of Historic Places in 1977.

Was used as a Bed and Breakfast till 2015 when the owner decided to sell the property.
