= Union Grove Schoolhouse =

- U.S. National Register of Historic Places
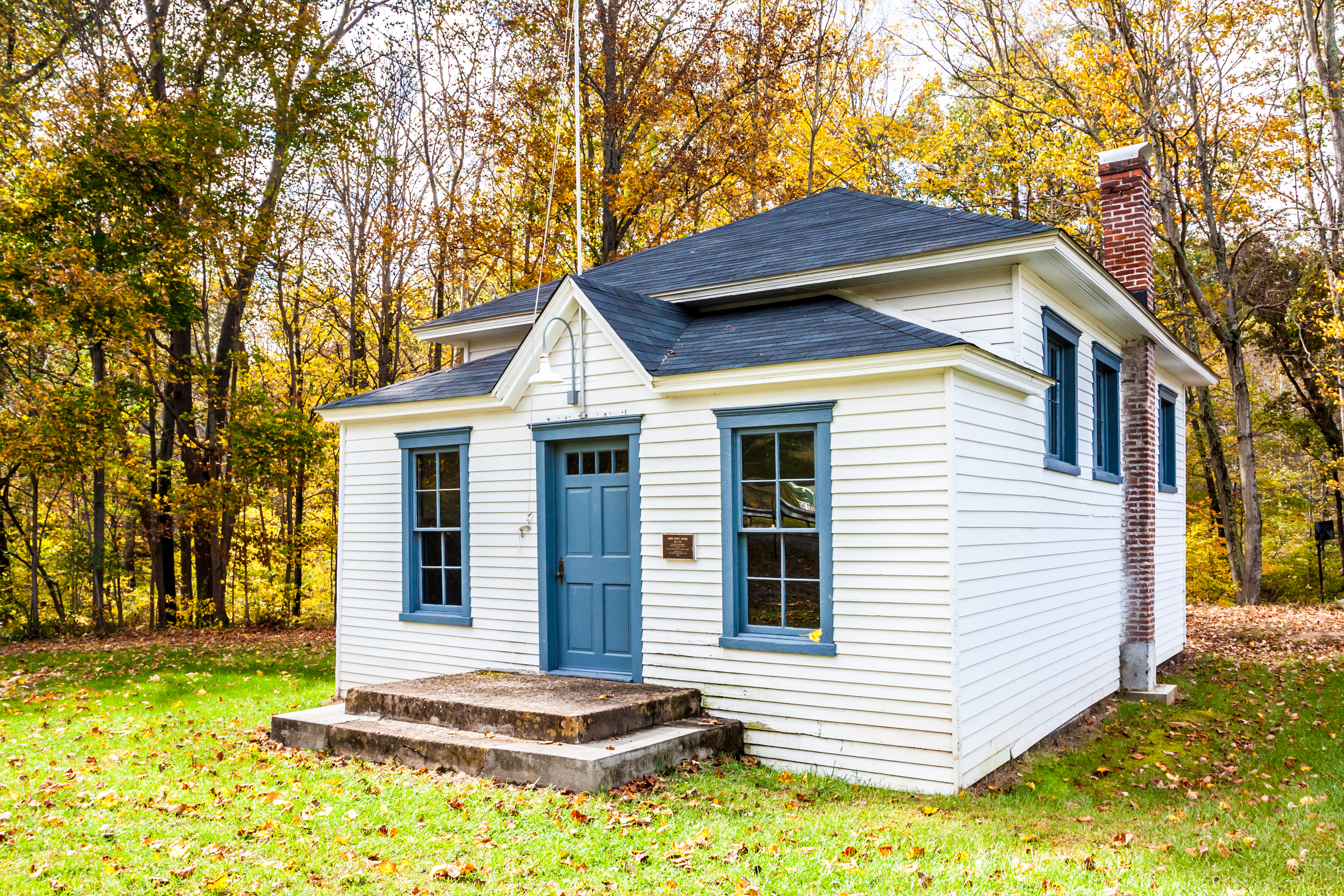
- Union Grove one-room schoolhouse, Dickens, Maryland

- Location within Maryland Location within the United States
- Location: 13220 Mason Road, Dickens, Maryland
- Coordinates: 39°42′21″N 78°41′51″W
- Area: 0.5 acres (0.20 ha)
- Built: 1905
- NRHP reference No.: 79001108
- Added to NRHP: July 24, 1979

Union Grove Schoolhouse is a historic one-room school building in Dickens, Allegany County, Maryland. It is a one-story frame building, rectangular in plan, containing a single classroom and an entrance vestibule. It is the last remaining one-room schoolhouse on its original site and in unaltered condition in Allegany County.

It was listed on the National Register of Historic Places in 1979.

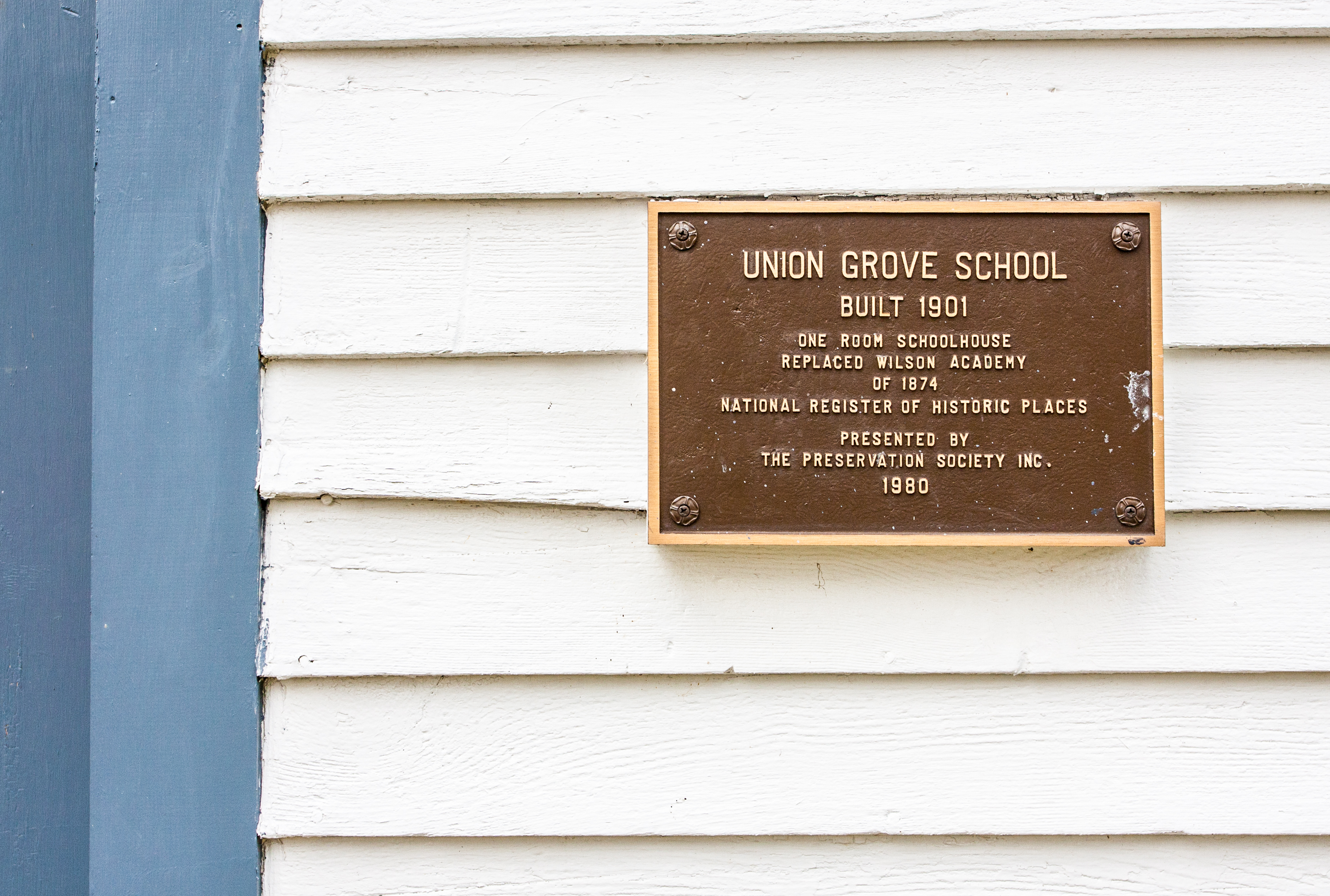
Historical Marker on front of Union Grove Schoolhouse.
