= African Methodist Episcopal Church (Cumberland, Maryland) =

Historic church in Maryland, US

- U.S. National Register of Historic Places
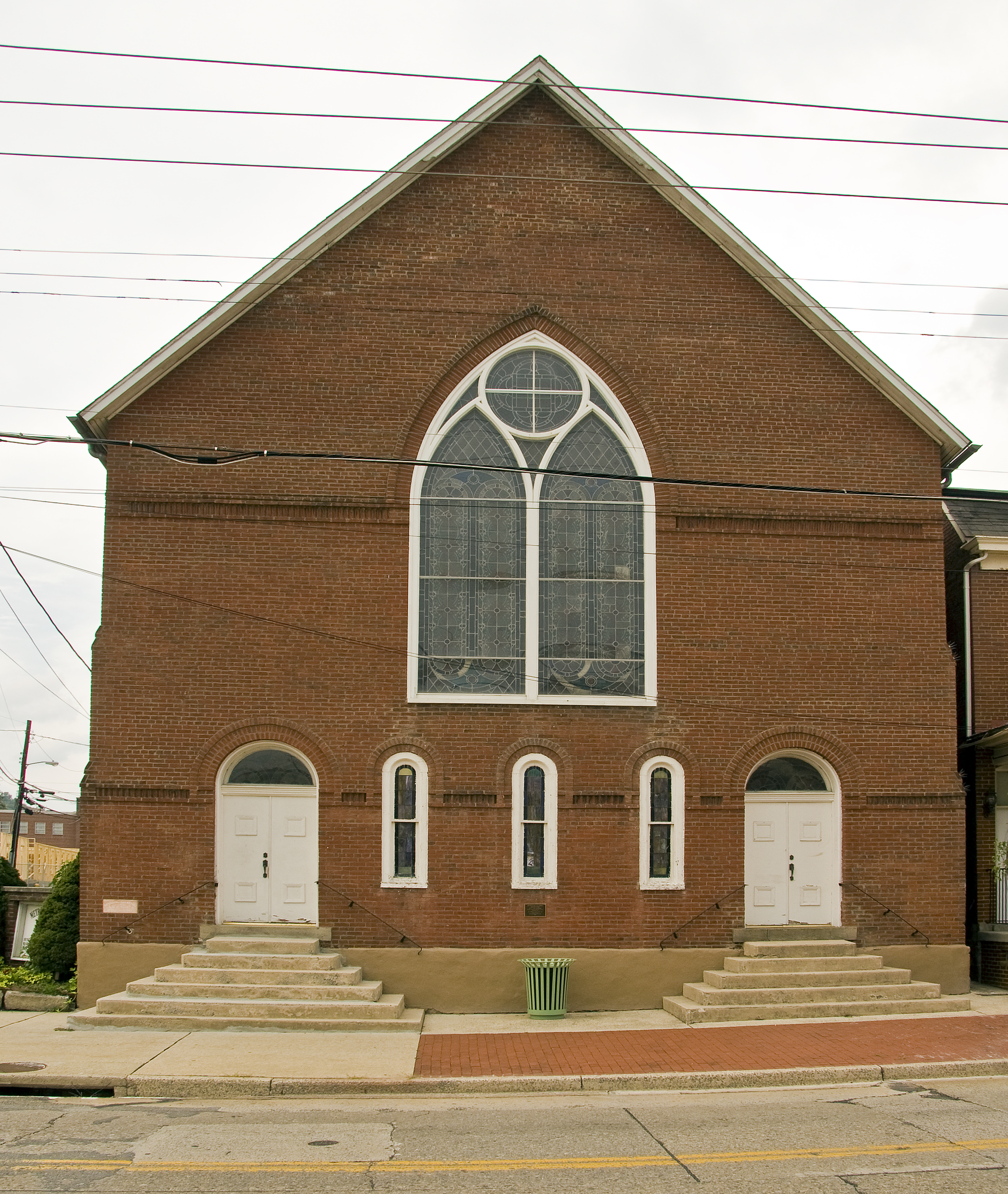
- African Methodist Episcopal Church, August 2010

- Location within Maryland Location within the United States
- Location: Decatur and Frederick Sts., Cumberland, Maryland
- Coordinates: 39°39′22.18″N 78°45′35.96″W
- Area: 0.5 acres (0.20 ha)
- Built: 1892
- NRHP reference No.: 79001105
- Added to NRHP: April 20, 1979

The African Methodist Episcopal Church in Cumberland, Allegany County, Maryland, was built in 1892 to replace a previous church which the congregation had outgrown. The congregation was founded in 1847 by a group of African-American Methodists who had previously worshiped from the balcony of the Centre Street Methodist Episcopal Church. The first church was built in 1848, then rebuilt and enlarged in 1871 and again in 1875.

The church follows Methodist practice by placing Sunday school and meeting space on the street level, with the sanctuary above.

It was listed on the National Register of Historic Places in 1979.

== See also ==
- African Methodist Episcopal Church
