= Big Bottom Farm =

Historic house in Maryland

- U.S. National Register of Historic Places
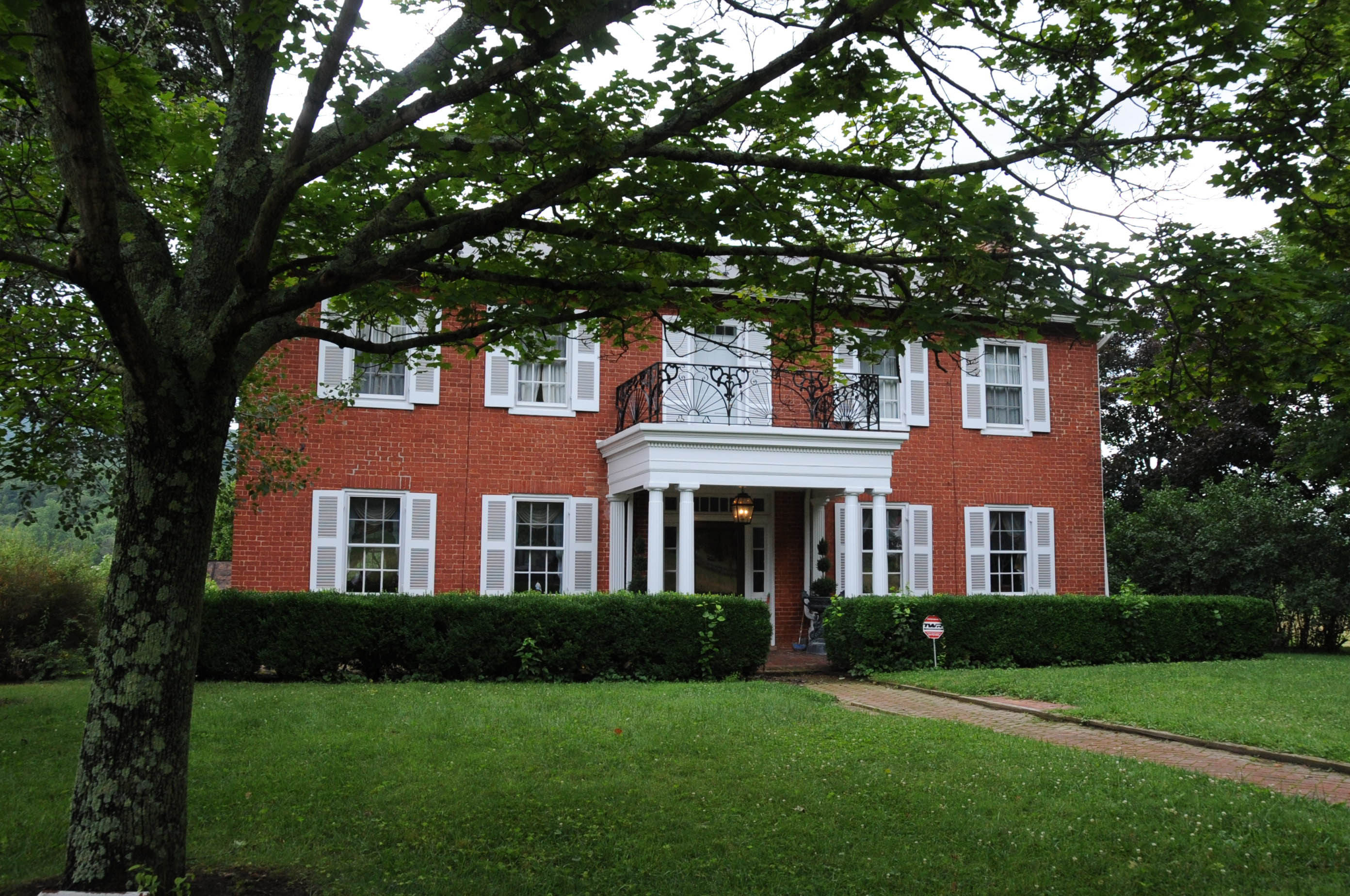

- Location within Maryland Location within the United States
- Location: 14220 Hazen Road, Dickens, Maryland
- Coordinates: 39°43′7″N 78°41′44″W
- Area: 5 acres (2.0 ha)
- Built: c. 1845
- Architectural style: Greek Revival
- NRHP reference No.: 84001319
- Added to NRHP: June 7, 1984

Big Bottom Farm is a farm in Allegany County, Maryland, United States, on the National Register of Historic Places. The Greek Revival house was built circa 1845, possibly by John Jacob Smouse, and exhibits a level of historically accurate detailing unusual for the area. The property includes a late 19th-century barn and several frame outbuildings.

== History ==
Located in the town of Dickens in Allegany County, Maryland, Big Bottom Farm's central farmhouse was built in the mid-19th century by John Jacob Smouse, whose family owned land in the county around Evitt's Creek.

== Description ==
Big Bottom farm includes a number of farm buildings dating from the 19th century and early 20th century. The oldest of these is the brick farmhouse itself, built with a number of features influenced by Greek Revival architecture. It has two stories, five bays, and a gable roof, with a two floor extension in the rear with two additional bays. A later extension added on this rear wing added a third bay. The front of the building is decorated with Flemish bond brickwork, with a centerpiece Greek Revival-influenced porch over a first floor door. A door from the second floor opens onto the top of the porch. This porch has fluted Doric columns, a dentiled cornice, and an iron railing surrounding its flat roof. It shades a four-panel door edged by transom and sidelights.

There was likely a two-story porch on the rear extension as well when the house was originally built, but it has since been enclosed. The windows are 6/6 sash and have louvered shutters. Each gable end of the building is topped by a brick chimney. Inside, it has a central stair hall with a large room to either side, and is decorated with mid-19th-century Greek Revival woodwork, consisting largely of symmetrical molding, fluted in the main parlor, with mantles of flat pilasters supporting deep shelves. Aside from the farmhouse, the farm includes a late 19th-century barn, a machinery shed, a corn crib, a wash house, and two chicken coops.

== Significance ==
The Farm was listed on the National Register of Historic Places in 1984. The core structure of its farmhouse is typical of farmhouses in western Maryland, but the Greek Revival touches make it unique among such buildings in Allegany County. Its detailing is largely intact.
