= Mount Savage Locomotive Works =

The Mount Savage Locomotive Works was a railroad workshop established at Mount Savage, Maryland, US. The Cumberland and Pennsylvania Railroad locomotive shops were established in Mt. Savage in 1866, under the direction of James Millholland. The original locomotive shop was constructed of stone and was 90 feet x 250 feet in size with a 33-foot-high roof. An adjoining car shop, built at about the same time, was also of stone and was later extended with a wooden structure. These buildings still stand in Mt. Savage.

== Personnel ==
=== James Millholland, Senior ===
James Millholland, Senior was 54 years old when he and his family came to Mt. Savage from Reading, Pennsylvania. Millholland was a master mechanic and an "advocate of plain engines and simplicity." He had extensive experience in keeping Winans camel engines running from his earlier work in Pennsylvania with the Baltimore & Susquehanna Railroad, and he was credited with many important locomotive innovations. He came in 1866 as the President of Consolidation Coal, and of the C&P. He resigned in 1869, to his estate on the Valley Road, in Cumberland. He was credited with developing the first anthracite-burning locomotive, and was Superintendent of Motive Power for the line for many years. He is also credited with constructing the first iron deck girder bridge in the U.S. for the Baltimore & Susquehanna near Bolton in the period 1846–47. He was responsible for so many improvements to the basic Winans camel engine, that the class was referred to as "Millholland Camels". He is credited with designing a 12-wheeled camel engine, built in the P&R shops in 1863.

=== James Millholland, Junior ===
His son, James Junior, was 24 when the family moved to Mt. Savage. He had been born in Reading in 1842, and had apprenticed in the railroad shops. He also joined the C&P, becoming Master Mechanic, and was vice president by the time his father retired. He left the C&P in 1879 to join the George's Creek and Cumberland Railroad. The younger Millholland was tasked with building the C&P shops, to maintain the mixed fleet of motive power. He had the right experience for the job.

Millholland bought good machine tools, which were still in use 40 years later as evidenced by the 1917 ICC valuation. He equipped the shops with metal working machinery from Bement & Dougherty, probably a predecessor of Wm. B. Bement & Son of Philadelphia.

== Work undertaken ==
=== Repair and rebuilding ===
Initially, the work supervised by Millholland at the Mt. Savage Shops was limited to repairing and rebuilding the Winans Camels and other early C&P locomotives. The shop force gained much hands-on experience during the first twenty years; at least 15 of the C&P's camel-backed locos were rebuilt at Mt. Savage (some twice). Typical of the rebuilds was the engine Highlander, a Winans Camel inherited from the Mount Savage Railroad. It was a modernization project in which, among other things, the cab was relocated from on top of the boiler to the rear position. The C&P shops also provided repair services to its rivals in the Georges Creek coal region.

=== New build ===
Initially, the Winans Camels and other early locomotives were extensively rebuilt, and much hands-on experience was gained during the period from 1866 to 1888. The first recorded engine 'build' was a 0-10-0 unit in 1868. This could have been a modification to a Winans Camel. By the 1880s, the shops that Millholland had set up apparently had built quite an extensive operation, able to offer custom built locomotives for sale in addition to meeting the requirements of the parent C&P.

The period beginning in 1883 was an exciting one for heavy manufacturing in Mount Savage. A locomotive catalog was issued for the Works by their agent, Thomas B. Inness & Co. of Broadway, New York. The catalog listed five types of engines for sale, and their specifications. Evidence was that the catalog was successful, and numerous sales to other roads resulted. This helped finance production for the home road, spurred development, and helped employment. Narrow gauge engines proved so popular a product that the works installed a third rail up the main line from Mount Savage for customer acceptance testing.

Engine production was active between 1885 and 1917. Engines were produced for other roads as well. The production figures for 1882 list 19 passenger and freight engines outshopped, with 16 more in 1883.

One particularly good customer was T. H. Paul & Sons of Frostburg. A former C&P master mechanic himself (1854–1855), Paul established shops in Cumberland and Frostburg. He built mine engines and smaller narrow gauge locomotives at his shops, but contracted with Mount Savage for his larger orders. His Frostburg works were located near the existing C&P Passenger station, and some of the buildings still stand in 1999.

== Heavy machinery ==
The following table shows some of the machinery used in the original shop. All of the rotating power machinery was driven by leather belts from overhead master shafts. These in turn, were powered by a stationary steam engine in the adjacent power house. A similar facility may be seen today at the East Broad Top Railroad, in Pennsylvania.

Equipment from Bement & Dougherty, unless otherwise noted

- engine lathe, 28-inch x 8-foot bed
- horizontal boring and drilling machine, table size 24 inches x 44 inches
- 18-inch x 48-inch engine lathe, C&P
- 18-inch x 24-inch engine lathe, C&P
- vertical boring mill 54 inches
- car wheel boring mill, 48-inch table
- 10-inch slotter
- wooden jib crane, 20-foot mast, 15-foot boom, 4.5-ton capacity, C&P
- punch & shear, 30-inch throat (used for rivet holes)

Car shop

The car shop would build the wooden parts of the engine, such as the cab.

- 18-inch rip saw
- Lowell drill press
- Tice shaper/molder

Blacksmith shop

- Fulton 500-pound power hammer (for forging)

== Manufacturing procedures ==
Locomotive manufacturing during this period was hard, heavy, dangerous work. It proceeded according to numerous 'rules of thumb' developed by the master mechanic over the years. Innovations were introduced slowly. There were continuous efforts to reduce costs, and increase performance. Weight reduction was not desirable, as weight-on-drivers contributed directly to tractive effort. Locomotive frames were usually riveted, built-up construction, of wrought iron and later, steel.

According to White, experience at the Norris Locomotive Works showed that a team of 14 men could build a locomotive in 15 days. This was assuming the parts were on hand. A locomotive is a carefully integrated collection of a large number of specialty parts.

=== Boilers ===
The typical boiler was constructed of 5/16-inch wrought iron, starting as plate, and rolled to shape. The lap joints were single riveted. There is a long way between watertight and steam tight. Later, double riveting, and reinforced butt joints were used. Welding was not yet a developed technology, particularly for a pressure vessel. Boiler tubes were typically iron tubing of 2 inches diameter. They were lap welded, and reportedly difficult to flange.

==== Lagging ====
Boilers were covered, or lagged, to reduce heat loss, and increase efficiency. Wood slats were used originally. After 1900, asbestos was a favored lagging material. It was common for the slabs of the mineral to be machined to fit. This produced large clouds of asbestos dust that is now known to be a major carcinogen, a significant cause of lung cancer. The use of dust masks, hearing protection, and safety glasses was unknown at the time. The boiler shops were a haze of asbestos dust.

==== Water feed ====
Millholland favored Giffard's water injectors, based on the favorable experience with them on the Reading line. He was also an early advocate of feedwater heaters, using them as early as 1855. His designs have them on the right side, under the engine running board. They are about 10 feet long, and 8 inches in diameter. These are a visible clue to engines produced in Mount Savage. Millholland is also responsible for the development of the poppet throttle, originally retrofitted on Camel engines in Pennsylvania.

=== Cylinders ===
The cylinders were usually cast in halves, assembled, and bored to size. This represented the most complex and expensive operation of the whole locomotive assembly. In 1856, it was common for the boring operation to consume 2 days. The pistons were cast iron, with fitted brass piston rings.

=== Driving wheels ===
The driving wheels were typically cast iron, and axles were usually 6-inch-diameter wrought iron. Driving wheels were fitted with replaceable tires. On the basis of his previous experience, Millholland favored cast-iron tires, shrunk onto the wheels. His father had experimented with steel tires around 1851–52, and they became standard later. Some early accidents on the C&P involved wheel failures. In 1872, Engine No. 11 broke a wheel below Frostburg, requiring the assistance of the work train, and delaying the pay car, according to the Frostburg Mining Journal.

=== Connecting rods ===
Connecting rods were cast, and bearings were brass and/or Babbitt metal. The early lubricants were all animal fat based, and only suitable for low temperature applications. Later, petroleum based lubricants provided much better performance.

=== Gauges ===
Engine safety appliances were sparse. The Bourdon gauge for pressure readings was patented in 1849. A rival gauge was developed in 1857 by Wooten. Glass sight gauges for boiler water level were not popular until the 1890s. Part of the problem was production of the proper glass, and the sealing of the gauge.

=== Lamps ===
Head lights were originally oil lamps. These units were box-shaped, and had an 18- to 22-inch parabolic reflector. They could cast a 1000-foot beam, sufficient for low-speed operation in darkness. An important improvement was introduced with the advent of lamps powered by carbide. Similar to the lamps used by miners, these lamps used the reaction of water and the mineral calcium carbide to produce acetylene gas, which burned with a bright light. Later, electric lamps and generators were fitted. C&P tenders were also fitted with lamps on the rear, since the engines frequently operated in reverse on the various coal branches where they could not be turned.
