= Dickens, Maryland =

Unincorporated community in Maryland, United States

- Unincorporated community
- Location within the State of Maryland Dickens, Maryland (the United States)
- Coordinates: 39°42′26″N 78°41′35″W
- Country: United States
- State: Maryland
- County: Allegany
- Elevation: 781 ft (238 m)
- Time zone: UTC-5 (Eastern (EST))
  - Summer (DST): UTC-4 (EDT)
- GNIS feature ID: 588642

Dickens is an unincorporated community in Allegany County, Maryland, United States. Three sites are listed on the National Register of Historic Places: Big Bottom Farm, Phoenix Mill Farm, and Union Grove Schoolhouse.
