= Mount Savage, Maryland =

- Census-designated place
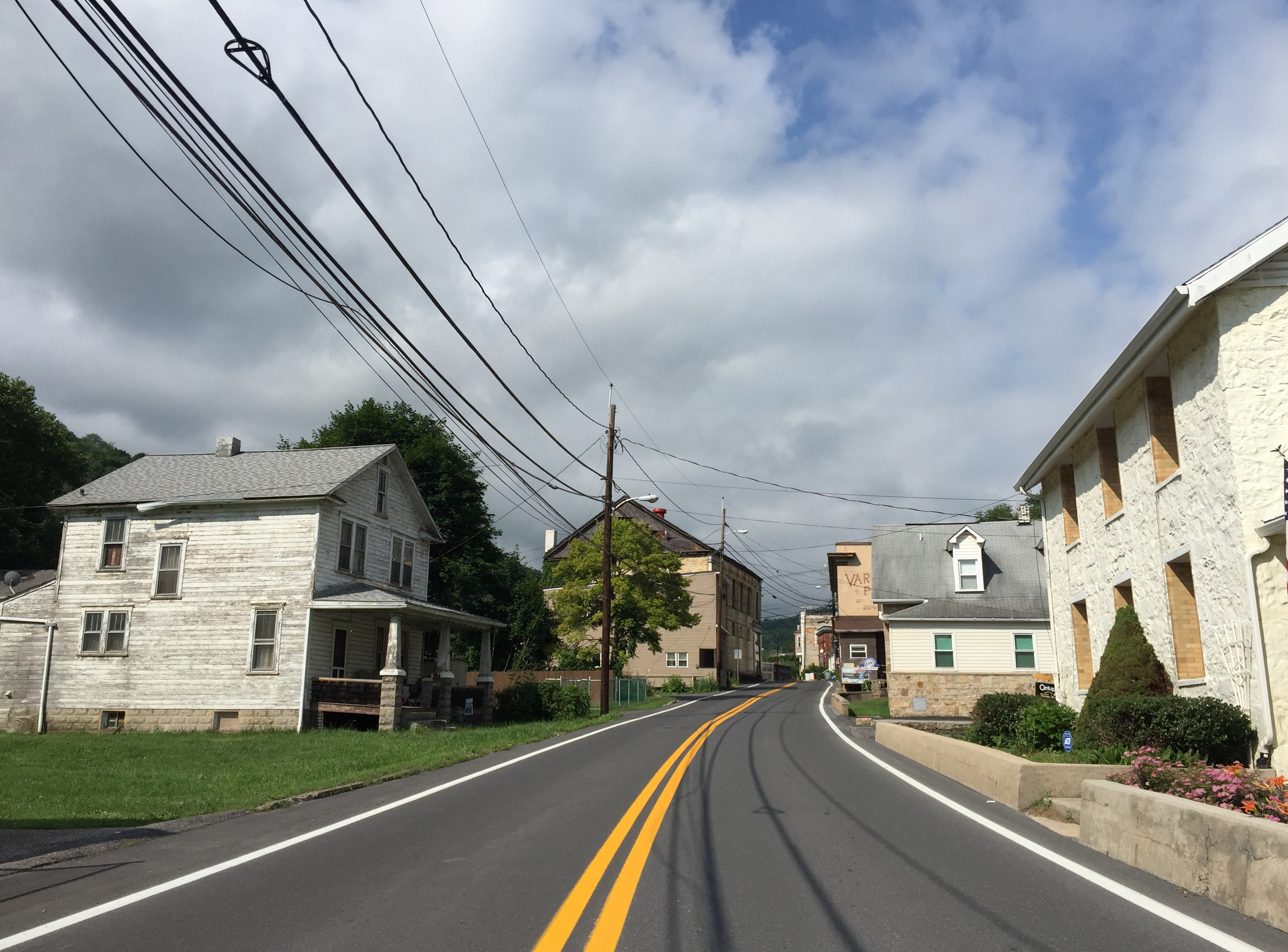

- Location within the state of Maryland Mount Savage (the United States)
- Coordinates: 39°41′52″N 78°52′26″W
- Country: United States
- State: Maryland
- County: Allegany

Area
  - Total: 0.96 sq mi (2.48 km^{2})
  - Land: 0.96 sq mi (2.48 km^{2})
  - Water: 0 sq mi (0.00 km^{2})
- Elevation: 1,243 ft (379 m)

Population (2020)
  - Total: 733
  - Density: 765.0/sq mi (295.36/km^{2})
- Time zone: UTC−5 (Eastern (EST))
  - Summer (DST): UTC−4 (EDT)
- ZIP code: 21545
- Area codes: 301, 240
- FIPS code: 24-54325
- GNIS feature ID: 2583661

Mount Savage is an unincorporated community and census-designated place (CDP) in Allegany County, Maryland, United States. As of the 2010 census it had a population of 873.

A small blue-collar community, Mount Savage lies at the base of Big Savage Mountain in the Allegheny Mountains, between the cities of Frostburg and Cumberland. It began as a small farming settlement in the mid-19th century, but it was not until 1844 that the region was put on the nation's map with the pressing of the first iron rail in the United States. After this claim to fame, Mount Savage became the fifth largest city in Maryland. Named as the headquarters for the Mount Savage Railroad and later the Cumberland and Pennsylvania Railroad (C&P), the area was deemed an industrial center. In addition to the rail businesses, Mount Savage attracted a foundry, two brick refractories, and several local merchants. In this company town, the industries shaped the economy and topography of Mount Savage, building housing for workers and donating land for schools, churches, and other public buildings. It was a cultural melting pot attracting English businessmen and Irish, Scottish, Welsh, Italian, and German workers. With this diverse mix of cultures, the identity of Mount Savage was molded into a close-knit community. Despite the loss of the industries to the region, Mount Savage continues to celebrate its hard-working traditions. The Mount Savage Historic District was listed on the National Register of Historic Places in 1983.

== Early history ==
The name origin of Mount Savage is derived from a land surveyor, Thomas Savage, who happened to be traveling through the area in 1736. The Archibald Arnold family later settled "Arnold's Settlement", now Mount Savage, around September 30, 1774. The town is the oldest in Allegany County to have a group of the same family to pioneer a town. The Arnolds were Catholic farmers originating from southern Maryland. The Arnold family settled northeast of the current town, along a Native American trail which was later known as "Turkey Foot Road". The Arnolds established a hotel, "Arnold's Hotel", which welcomed the pioneers who were heading out west towards the Ohio River Valley. They also had a self-sustaining farm which became part of the present-day Glen Savage Dairy Farm. The site of the hotel is along an 1804 alteration to the Turkey Foot Road. The Arnold family eventually owned most of the land of the present-day Mount Savage, Archibald sometimes purchasing 1,000 acres (4.0 km^{2}) at a time. Some areas of land that Arnold purchased were documented only as "Move About", "Tomahawk" and "Durbin's Neglect". In the early 19th century Mount Savage was primarily a self-sufficient farming community with no real need to embark onto enterprises with neighboring towns or industries. Mount Savage was the only town west of Cumberland with a Catholic church, so many families from neighboring states and towns traveled there for Mass. Upon completion of the National Road, settlers headed west by the thousands, flooding the Cumberland-Mount Savage area and calling attention to Mount Savage's mineral wealth.

=== Industrial history ===
The Maryland and New York Iron and Coal Company was incorporated in 1837. This important company was established by an Englishman, Benjamin Howell, who was one of the many travelers along the National Road. The company built the Mount Savage Iron Works, which utilized the iron ore that was abundant in the Mount Savage area. Following the construction of blast furnaces in 1839, the company built the Mount Savage Railroad in 1844 to connect the town to Cumberland and with the Baltimore and Ohio Railroad (B&O). The company produced about 200 tons of iron a week in 1845. The Mount Savage works was the only company in America to manufacture heavy railroad iron at that time. With the flourishing industry upon Mount Savage, clay, brick, coal and locomotives were also being manufactured and transported to neighboring towns and states by way of the new railroad system. The most prosperous coal mines were the Eckhart Mines, located southwest of Mount Savage, which produced bituminous coal. The Mount Savage railroad system became the main supplier to the B&O as well as the Chesapeake and Ohio Canal. By 1852 the iron works was considered to be the largest in the United States. By 1864, the Union Mining Company was established in Allegany County. This company controlled most of the clay and brick exports. Little Mount Savage had officially grown into a legendary, American industrial center.

The iron works faced competition from facilities in Pennsylvania and the Great Lakes region. The company's rolling mill was shut down in 1868 and the blast furnaces ceased operation c. 1870. The brick works continued to operate successfully and became the principal industry in the town through the late 20th century.

The C&P Railroad acquired the Mount Savage Railroad in 1854, and built shops to manufacture locomotives and other rolling stock in Mount Savage in 1866. The railroad operated through the mid-20th century.

== Demographics ==
Historical population
Census	Pop.	Note	%±
2020	733		—
U.S. Decennial Census

As of the 2010 census, there were 873 people in 338 households living within the boundaries of Mount Savage. 236 of those were family households. The racial makeup of Mount Savage was 96.4% White, 0.6% African American, 0.1% Asian, 1.3% some other race, and 1.6% two or more races. Hispanic or Latino of any race were 1.6% of the population.

There were 338 households, out of which 32.0% had children under the age of 18 living with them, 53.3% were headed by married couples living together, 11.5% had a female householder with no husband present, and 30.2% were non-family households. 26.0% of all households were made up of individuals, and 12.1% were someone living alone who was 65 years or older. The average household size was 2.58 and the average family size was 3.10.

In Mount Savage the population was spread out, with 23.1% below the age of 18, 8.0% from 18 to 24, 25.5% from 25 to 44, 27.0% from 45 to 64, and 16.5% who were 65 and older. The median age was 40.3. 49.5% of the population was male and 50.5% of the population was female.

For the period 2007–11, the median household income was $47,098 and the median income for a family was $48,833. The median income for male full-time workers was $53,153 versus $19,953 for females. The per capita income for Mount Savage was $18,636. 3.7% of families and 7.1% of the population were below the poverty line.

== Geography ==
Mount Savage is located at an elevation of 1,234 feet (376 m) in the valley of Jennings Run in western Allegany County. Mount Savage Run flows into Jennings Run in Mount Savage. Maryland Route 36 runs through the community, leading southwest 5 miles (8 km) to Frostburg and 10 miles (16 km) east to Cumberland. Sampson Rock, the 2,934-foot (894 m) summit of Big Savage Mountain, rises 2 miles (3 km) to the west of the village.

== Historic sites and museums ==
- Mount Savage Museum & Historical Park
- Union Mining Company Office Building
- C&P Railroad Office building
- Remains of the iron furnace where the first iron rail was rolled

== See also ==
- Mount Savage Historic District
- Eckhart Mines, Maryland
