= History of Cumberland, Maryland =

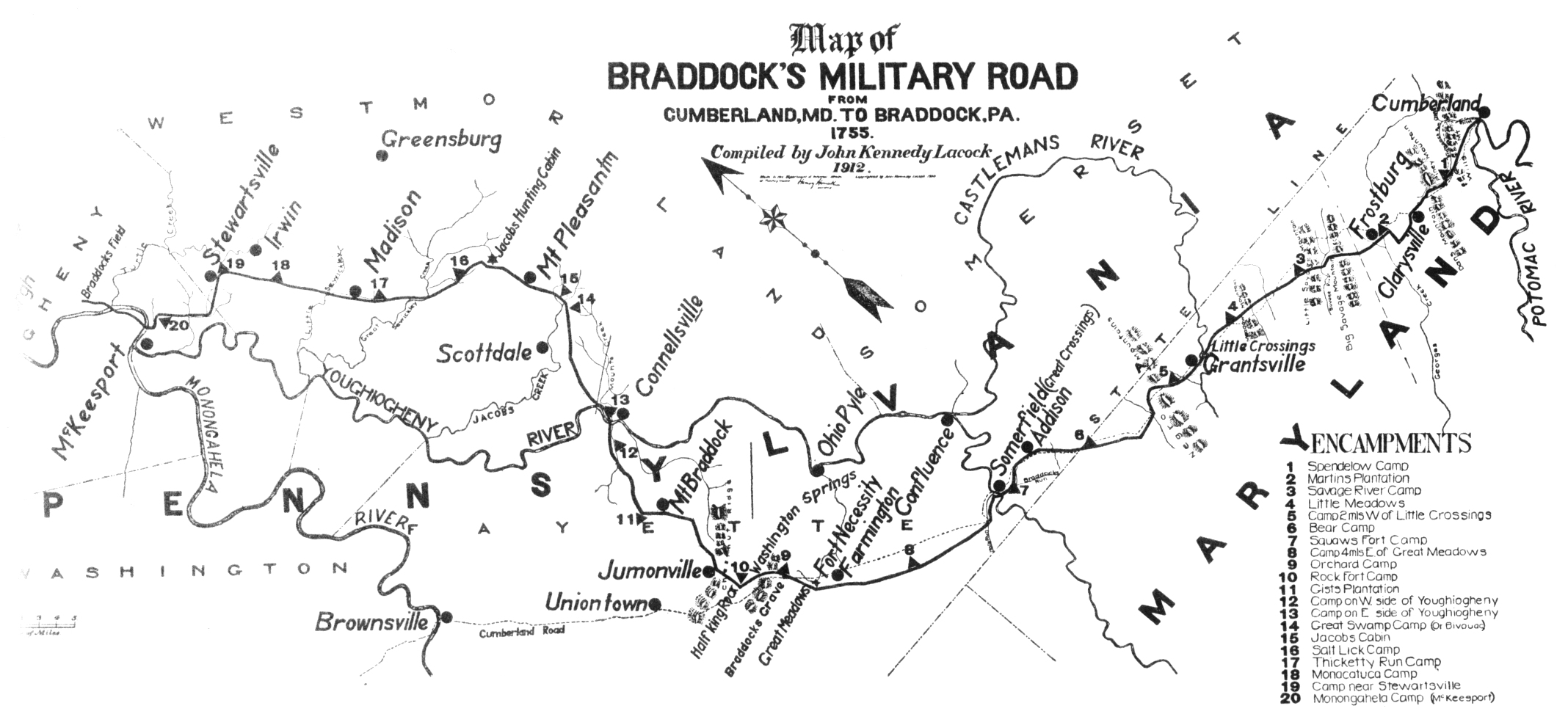
Map of Braddock's Military Road from Cumberland to Pennsylvania, built in 1755 during the French and Indian War

Cumberland, Maryland is named after the son of King George II, Prince William, the Duke of Cumberland. It is built on the site of the old Fort Cumberland, a launch pad for British General Edward Braddock's ill-fated attack on the stronghold of Fort Duquesne, located on the site of present-day Pittsburgh during the French and Indian War.

Cumberland was also an outpost of Colonel George Washington during the French and Indian War and his first military headquarters was built here. Washington later returned to Cumberland as President in 1794 to review troops that had been assembled to thwart the Whiskey Rebellion.

Cumberland was a key road, railroad and canal junction during the 19th century and at one time the second largest city in Maryland (second to the port city of Baltimore—hence its nickname "The Queen City"). The surrounding hillsides provided coal, iron ore, and timber that helped supply the Industrial Revolution. In addition, the city was a major manufacturing center, with industries in glass, breweries, fabrics, and tinplate. However, following World War II, it began to lose much of its industrial importance and its population declined from 39,483 residents in the 1940 census to fewer than 22,000 today.

The city of Cumberland has found itself a center of activity throughout its history. During its more than 200 years of existence, Cumberland has been a military fort, the origin point of America's first highway, the termination point of a monumental federal construction project, a western gateway to the Ohio River Valley, the processing center for rich coal fields, and a primary link on one of America's most successful railroads. Nestled dramatically at the base of converging mountain ridges and at the confluence of Wills Creek and the Potomac River, Cumberland conforms in its layout to the rugged topography within which it is situated. From its beginnings as a British fort to its place today as western Maryland's second largest city, Cumberland has always lived up to its nickname as "The Queen City."

== Pre-Colonial era ==
Artifacts pointing to civilizations in existence before the 1st century have been found in the Cumberland area. Prior to 1730, before the arrival of the first European settlers, a clan of Native Americans lived at the confluence of Wills Creek and the Potomac River on the site of modern-day Cumberland. The existence of this Indian village is noted on the maps of early European Surveyors from this period. The Indian town was called Caiuctucuc and consisted of a series of huts called wigwams that were built chiefly along the Potomac riverfront, now Greene Street. The natives referred to the present day Potomac River as the Cohongaronto River, and the present day Wills Creek as Caiuctucuc Creek.

== Colonial era ==
The name of Caiuctucuc was later changed by the first European settlers, in about 1750, to Wills Creek, and the settlement's name to Wills Town, in honor of the Indian chief called "Will", who lived on the mountain to the north of the village at that time. With the coming of the European settlers, most of the Indians abandoned this region and trailed across the mountains to the Ohio River Valley, but Indian Will was not hostile to the outside settlers, and with a few of his followers continued to live on the mountain where he had his wigwam. It is believed that he died there, some time after the close of the Revolutionary War. An old Indian grave on Will's Knob is supposed to be his. Chief Will claimed all the land along the creek and sold it to the European settlers for mere trifles.

When European settlers first began moving into western Maryland in the 1730s and 1740s, they encountered Native Americans residing between the Potomac and Susquehanna rivers. Conflicts ensued, and in 1744, the Maryland legislature purchased the land from the area's Native Americans, observing that they would settle "for nothing less than Blood or Money." This contract opened the area to official settlement. Germans, Swiss-Germans, and Scotch-Irish from Pennsylvania quickly colonized the area. Although the Maryland legislature had "purchased" the area, Virginia and Pennsylvania claimed the land as well. More troubling to the British Empire were French traders intent on securing their rights to the land.

In 1750, Virginia planters and English merchants established a trading house and small storehouse on land which is now the heart of Cumberland. The new trading post (later called Fort Cumberland) attracted the French, who moved south and west from their Lake Ontario forts, drove out the English traders and claimed the Ohio River Valley for France. In 1753, with tensions running high between the French and English, the Governor of Virginia sent a small company led by a young Virginian named George Washington to inform the French to leave English territory and return north. The French ignored Washington's warnings, and he returned to Virginia. In the spring of 1754, Colonel Washington returned to Fort Cumberland, this time with more men. Pushing north from Cumberland towards the forks of the Ohio River where Pittsburgh is now located, Washington's force (about 230 men) encountered 600 French and 100 Indian soldiers. An inexperienced 22-year-old, Washington did not withdraw, but instructed his men to build a fort, which he grimly named "Fort Necessity." On July 3, 1754, the French and Indian War officially began when both groups attacked the fort. Washington, completely surrounded and with one-third of his men killed, surrendered. Washington and his remaining troops were allowed to retreat (without their weapons) and returned to Fort Cumberland. With the loss of the Ohio River Valley, Fort Cumberland became the primary staging and supply point for the British on the colonial frontier.

The fort, and later the city, derived its name from the Duke of Cumberland, son of King George II of Great Britain. After British General Edward Braddock led another disastrous foray into the Ohio River Valley, George Washington served as commander of the Virginia troops during the French and Indian War, and spent a considerable amount of time in the Cumberland area. The cabin that served as his headquarters is the only building to survive from the Fort, and has been moved to Riverside Park. Washington's service in the area was important, because he became convinced that expansion west into the interior of North America and the Ohio River Valley came through Cumberland's valley. Washington later started a company (which failed) to make the Potomac River navigable between the Atlantic Ocean and Cumberland.

In the years between the end of the French and Indian War and the beginning of the American Revolution, Cumberland grew as a town, was designated the seat of the newly created Allegany County, and was poised to become a major artery on the edge of the American frontier.

== Post-Colonial ==
Following the American Revolution, land hungry settlers began to push purposefully past the land west of the Appalachian Mountains. Cumberland grew slowly, until the much-anticipated Chesapeake and Ohio Canal (C&O) and Baltimore and Ohio Railroad (B&O) arrived in the mid-19th century. These improved transportation routes, along with the increase development and trade opportunities they fostered, transformed this small town into the second largest city in Maryland.

== Civil War ==
During the Civil War Cumberland was a union stronghold and troops were garrisoned there to protect the B&O Railroad. Confederate raiders routinely raided the city and in one daring raid by McNeill's Rangers kidnapped two Union generals, including General George Crook.

In 1864, Confederate General John McCausland advanced along the Baltimore Pike towards Cumberland, Maryland, to disrupt the B&O Railroad. Union Brig. Gen. Benjamin F. Kelley organized a small force of soldiers and ambushed the Rebel cavalrymen near Cumberland at Folck’s Mill forcing the Confederates to withdraw. (See Battle of Cumberland)

Subsequently, race relations were unsettled. In 1907, a mixed-race man named William Burns, accused of the murder of a white policeman named August Baker, was lynched on the steps of the Cumberland jail.

== Industrial Revolution ==
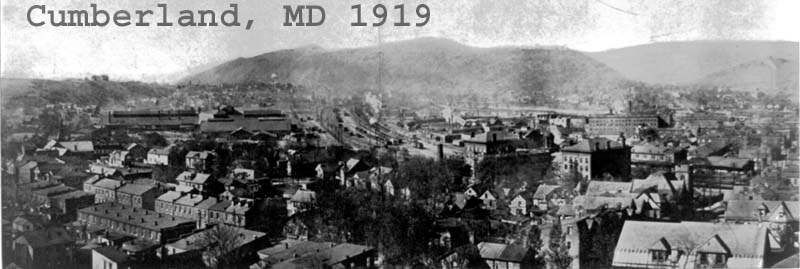
Panoramic view of Cumberland, 1919

Through much of its history, Cumberland's economic prosperity derived from its position as an early transportation hub linking the East Coast with the Midwest. Because of its strategic location at a gap in the mountains, Cumberland was in 1806 the starting point for the nation's first highway, the National Road (later known as U.S. Route 40). The road reached Wheeling, Virginia on the Ohio border in 1818. Of even greater significance to Cumberland's economic development in the 19th century were the B&O Railroad, which reached Cumberland from Baltimore in 1842, and the Chesapeake and Ohio Canal from Georgetown, Washington, D.C. to Cumberland, which opened in 1850. By the 1890s, five railroads served Cumberland and employed over 2,000 local people.

The C&O Canal was also an important commercial link between East and West, providing bulk transport of items such as coal, flour, iron, and limestone products. Facilitated by Cumberland's importance as a transportation hub, manufacturing emerged as a major force in the local economy in the 19th century. By the mid-19th century Cumberland was the second largest manufacturing center in the State of Maryland, a ranking not surpassed until approximately 1915 by Hagerstown, Maryland. Important industries included glass manufacturing, brewing, textiles, and iron and steel works. The B&O Railroad's rolling mill, located off Williams Street and Maryland Avenue, was a major employer in Cumberland from 1870 into the 20th century.

Coal mining quickly became the most important industry in the Cumberland area. Some of the richest beds of soft, bituminous coal in the country lay within the hills and mountains of this region. After the Civil War, coal became one of Maryland's chief products and exports. Coal from the Cumberland area fueled the state's mills and plants, steamships in Baltimore's harbor as well as the US Navy fleet, and was traded to buyers from London, Brazil, Egypt, and beyond. Primarily Scotch and Welsh immigrants provided the labor force for these mines, immigrating with their families for the opportunities America offered. In the Cumberland region, miners escaped the indebtedness to the mining company that plagued miners in surrounding states. The company store system, in which miners were forced to purchase all their supplies and household needs from the mining company, was outlawed in Maryland in 1868. A comparatively high proportion of miners were also homeowners, as local mining firms found it more profitable to sell houses to their miners, than establish company housing. Cumberland's coal mines were constructed with horizontal shafts, far less dangerous that the vertical mines of Pennsylvania and West Virginia. Still, Cumberland's miners blackened from head to foot when they emerged from a mine at the end of a day knew that the carbon-filled air, which corroded the lungs overtime, would lead to an early death.

Various manufacturing plants were established in Cumberland, because of its proximity to sources of fuel and raw materials and its position on major transportation routes. Cumberland blossomed as a result, the downtown commercial area thrived, and impressive residences built around the city reflected individual prosperity. The city became the economic center of the region. Rural farmers, industrial workers and miners traveled downtown along with successful industrialists, businessmen and county officials.

=== Consolidation Coal Company and the Big Vein ===
In the early 19th century a 14-foot (4.3 m) thick seam of bituminous coal referred to historically as "The Big Vein" was discovered in the Georges Creek Valley. This coal region became famous for its clean-burning low sulfur content that made it ideal for powering ocean steamers, river boats, locomotives, and steam mills, and machines shops.

By 1850, almost 30 coal companies were mining the Georges Creek Valley, producing over 60 million tons of coal between 1854 and 1891. The Consolidation Coal Company, established in 1864 and headquartered in Cumberland, Maryland became one of the largest bituminous coal companies in the eastern United States and Cumberland had financial connections that reached beyond Washington, DC and Baltimore to New York City and London. Mine owners and their lawyers announced their importance by building large houses on the Cumberland higher grounds. A few miles west of the city clusters of company towns lined the valley and spread into adjoining ravines.

Maryland's coal production began in the 1780s, when small amounts were mined for Fort Cumberland, a frontier outpost. In 1830, the first coal shipments eastward were made by barge down the Potomac River, a route later abandoned because of the rapids in the river. The State's first coal mining company was incorporated in 1836, but coal production did not become important unit the B&O Railroad reached Cumberland in 1842. In 1850, the opening of the Chesapeake and Ohio Canal from Cumberland to Washington, DC provided another route for coal shipments. Over 21 million short tons of coal were transported on the canal before it closed in 1923.

Maryland's coal production rose about 1 million short tons in 1865, exceeded 4 million short tons by the turn of the 20th century, and reached an all-time high of about 6 million short tons in 1907. A small amount of the coal production in the early 20th century was premium smithing coal (as in blacksmith) that was specially processed and delivered in box cars to customers throughout the United States and Canada. Coal production declined sharply after 1920, reflecting downturns in the economy recurrent labor problems and the extensive replacement of coal by the petroleum. Production fell below 1 million short tons during the 1950s and early 1960s before the trend turned up-wards, due mostly to an increasing use of coal to generate electricity. Over 3 million short tons were produced by the state of Maryland in 1992.

=== Transportation and distribution ===
Railroads in the Wills Creek valley and the Narrows west of Cumberland in the early 20th century. Blue: Baltimore and Ohio Railroad (1842–1986). Red: Cumberland and Pennsylvania Railroad (1845 (as Mount Savage Railroad)–1953). Green: Georges Creek and Cumberland Railroad (1876–1939). Yellow: Western Maryland Railway (1906–1987). Orange: Huntingdon and Broad Top Mountain Railroad (1872–1954). Today CSXT continues to operate the former B&O line through the valley.

Transportation systems have played a major role in the history and development of Cumberland. Situated on the Potomac River at a natural gateway through the mountains, Cumberland prospered in its early years as a major transportation hub. The development of the National Road, the country's first federally funded public works project, began in Cumberland in 1811 and reached Wheeling, West Virginia by 1818. Cumberland's transportation system evolved around the C&O Canal and burgeoning rail lines, shaped by the natural setting of the mountains, Potomac River, and Wills Creek. The B&O Railroad reached Cumberland in 1842, followed by the Mount Savage Railroad in 1845, Huntingdon and Broad Top Mountain Railroad in 1872, the Georges Creek and Cumberland Railroad in 1876, and the Western Maryland Railway in 1906. (The Mount Savage Railroad was purchased by the Cumberland and Pennsylvania Railroad in 1854.)

The completion of Interstate 68 in the late 1960s improved connections to outside regions including the Baltimore/Washington metropolitan area to the east, Harrisburg to the northeast, and Pittsburgh to the northwest.

=== Electric trolleys ===
Electric Trolleys experienced rapid expansion in the Cumberland Region starting in 1891 with the inauguration of the Cumberland Electric Railway. The railway initially transported passengers along North Centre Street to Narrows Park for a fare of five cents. The company later expanded its business by building a recreational complex on 15 acres (61,000 m^{2}) of land in an area formerly known as Seiss’ Picnic Grove, at the western end of the Cumberland Narrows near the present day Starlight Skating Rink. The Park included a soda fountain, dance and roller skating pavilion, and bandstand. In 1914, Kirkstetler Amusement leased the park to build an amusement park, that included a roller coaster, a merry-go-round, and a miniature railroad ride. In summer evenings the park was patronized by large crowds, and the trolley company expanded to meet the demand by adding extra, open sided cars to handle the traffic.

- 1891-1924 Cumberland Electric Railway
- 1924-1932 Potomac Edison Co. (American Water Works & Electric Co.)
- 1893-???? Lonaconing and Cumberland Electric Railway
- ????-???? Frostburg, Eckhart, and Cumberland Railway
- ????-???? Lonaconing, Midland and Frostburg Railway
- ????-???? Westernport and Lonaconing Railway Company
- 1906-1932 Cumberland and Westernport Electric Railway The C&WE trolley system consolidated the regional trolley lines of Lonaconing, Midland, Frostburg, Westernport, and Lonaconing into one system with nearly 30 miles (48 km) of track, running from Cumberland to Frostburg and then down to the valley to Westernport linking together the largest far western population centers
- 1932 - streetcars discontinued in Cumberland

=== Brewing industry ===
Breweries existed in Cumberland as early as 1852. Bartholomew Himmler established a brewery, about 1852, on Knox and Hays Streets. The brewery was often called "Bartle's Brewery", short for Bartholomew.

- The Cumberland Brewing Company (1890–1958) which operated on North Centre Street produced Old Export Beer and Gamecock Ale. The Cumberland Brewing Company was the oldest major brewery that operated in Cumberland, and was purchased by Queen City Brewing Company in 1958. It was the last surviving brewery in Cumberland before it closed its doors in 1976.
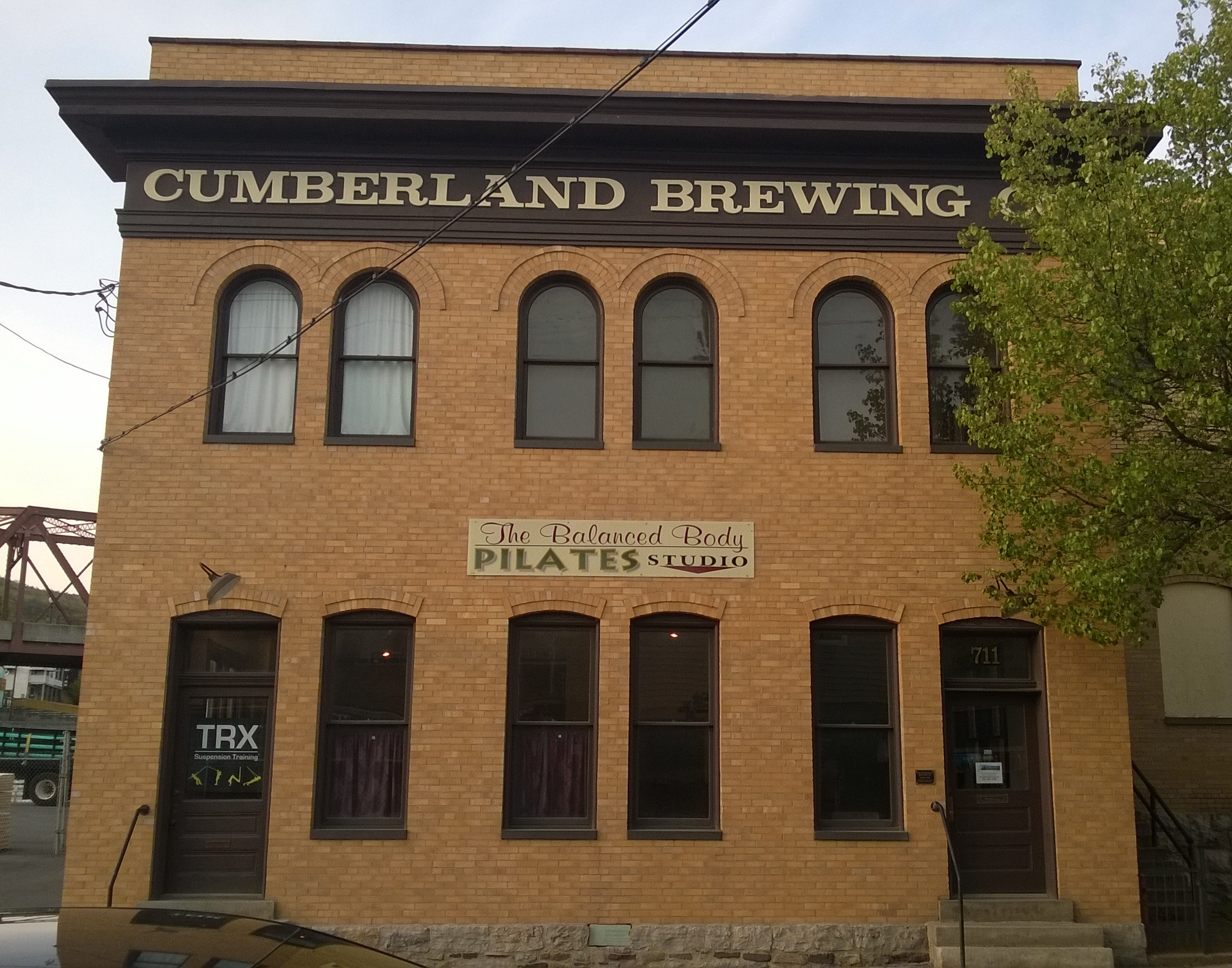
  Cumberland Brewing Company Brewery
- The Queen City Brewing Company, aka German Brewing Company, (1901–1974) which operated on Market Street, produced Old German Beer Premium Lager. In the 1970s Pittsburgh Brewing Company acquired the Queen City Brewing Company. At its peak, the Queen City brewery produced over 250,000 barrels of beer and ale a year in Cumberland.

Queen City Brewing closed in 1974, citing rising costs of agricultural products and packaging. The year had been a tumultuous one for Queen City. In February, a nationwide independent truckers strike, protesting rising gas prices, cut off supplies for the brewery and prevented beer from being distributed to buyers. The 1973-75 recession, marked by high unemployment and high inflation, was taking its toll. The company at first demanded pay cuts from the 150 employees. Their union, Local 265, Allegany Brewery Workers, responded by demanding to see the company's books because the company was claiming that financial problems required the cuts. The company refused to open its books and make its proof, and the workers voted down the concessions. A spokesman for Local 265 explained that "members felt that if the brewery situation had deteriorated to the point of asking workers to take a cut in pay then the problem had gone too far out of hand."

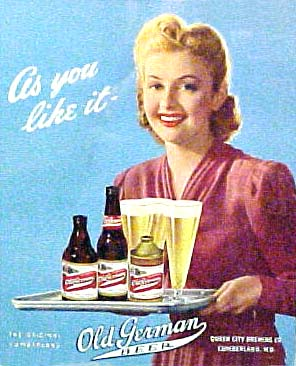
Old German Beer poster

=== Glass industry ===
Glass manufacturing played an important role in the growth of Cumberland from 1880 to 1930. The Warren Glass Works Company located in South Cumberland, and the Cumberland Glass Works located at the west end of North Mechanic Street, were established in the early 1880s and would become the two major glass making firms. The industry used local coal as an economical fuel, and native pure silica sandstone in the making of the glass. At the peak of production, around 1920, well over 1,000 people were employed in the glass factories and decorating shops. The onset of the Great Depression, coupled with the destruction of seven factories by fire dealt the glass industry in Cumberland a fatal blow. Recently, however, a glass decorating business opened in the city, using some equipment from the former companies.

Cumberland Glass Manufacturers:

- 1884-1905: Cumberland Glass Works (1884–1905), National Glass Company (1889–1905), Wellington Glass (1908–1920)
- 1880-1913: Warren Glass Works Company(1880–1889), South Cumberland Glass (1889–1890), Queen City Glass (1890–1909), Eastern Glass (1909–1913),
- 1893-1930: Maryland Glass Etching Company
- 1895-1896: Enterprise Glass Decorating
- 1904-1924: Potomac Glass
- 1911-1912: Cumberland Glass Tube Company
- 1918-1935: Maryland Glass
- 1936-1938: Maryland Glass Inc., formerly Maryland Glass
- 1938-1941: NU Glass
- 1923-1926: C. A. Borchert
- 1926-1926: Queen City Glass
- 1927-1928: Braddock Glass - LaVale, Maryland
- 1927-1928: Zihlman Glass
- 1928-1929: Independent Glass - LaVale, Maryland
- 1930-1932: Sloan Glass
- 1931-1933: Eichner Cut Glass
- 1932-1956: Cumberland Glass - LaVale, Maryland
- 1956-1961: Cumberland Glass - Mount Savage, Maryland
- 1932-1987: Queen Glass - LaVale, Maryland
- 1935-1961: Kortwright, Nehring, Weaver Inc
- 1935-1956: Sloan Glass
- 1956-1968: Sloan Glass - Green Spring, West Virginia
- 1953-1972: Oglebay Glass
- 1954-1992 PPG Cumberland Works No. 7 - Constructuted in 1953 by the Pittsburgh Plate Glass Company, the Works No. 7 Plant manufactured plate glass in Cumberland from 1953 to 1981. In 1981, the No. 7 manufacturing facility was shut down and used as a research and development facility until 1992.
- 1956-1968: Knoche Cut Glass.

=== Tire industry ===
As coal production diminished in the first quarter of the 20th century, idled miners offered a deep bench of a labor force for manufacturers looking to expand. One such company was Kelly-Springfield Tire Company of Akron, Ohio. The deal between Cumberland and Kelly-Springfield was sealed in 1916, when the city offered the company $750,000 in cash, raised through bonds bought by Cumberland citizens, and a 10-year exemption from taxes. Groundbreaking for the plant along the Potomac River across from Ridgeley, West Virginia, began in 1917. The first tire was produced in April 1921. At its peak the company employed well over 2,000 people. The new plant site comprised 81 acres (330,000 m^{2}). Fourteen years later, in 1935, the company was sold to Goodyear Tire & Rubber Company, which operated Kelly-Springfield as a wholly owned subsidiary.

Soon after passage of the National Labor Relations Act (NLRA), employees at the Cumberland plant voted in 1937 to formally select the United Rubber Workers of America, Local 26, as their exclusive bargaining representative, though Local 26 had represented many of the workers already in organizing efforts and a strike in 1936.

In 1942, the plant briefly switched from making tires to producing munitions for the United States military in support of World War II. By 1943, it reconverted to tire manufacturing to supply U.S. Army vehicles.

In the early 1980s, the plant was used by Goodyear to produce bias medium truck tires and bias auto tires. The market for these tires deteriorated, resulting in rounds of layoffs and worker concessions, and Local 26 repeatedly pressed the company to invest money to convert the plant to radial truck tire production, as other plants had, to no avail.

In 1986, in the era of corporate raids, British financier Sir James Goldsmith, with assistance from the investment bank Merrill Lynch, attempted a hostile takeover of Goodyear, buying up company stock. To ward off the takeover, Goodyear CEO Robert E. Mercer had to raise millions of dollars to buy back the stock at a premium from Goldsmith. The debt incurred forced Goodyear to close the Cumberland Kelly-Springfield plant in 1987, just 66 years after it made its first tire. Local 26 President Clayton Oster testified in Congress that the closure cost Cumberland $175 million while Goldsmith made $94 million from his unsuccessful takeover ploy. The layoffs of more than 1,000 workers were devastating to Cumberland, already reeling from a shrinking manufacturing base.

Local 26 filed an ultimately unsuccessful $200 million class action against the company, seeking to stop the closure, since the company had promised the union it would perform a study to find ways to keep the plant operating but closed before doing so. Then-Maryland Governor William Donald Schaeffer criticized the lawsuit for fear it would scare the company away as he scrambled to secure an agreement to keep some part of Kelly-Springfield in Cumberland. Under the deal, Maryland promised to pay $15.1 million to construct offices and a laboratory for the company, a full $5 million more than was originally estimated as needed. Per the deal, the company's corporate offices were moved to a new facility on Willowbrook Road in Cumberland, with a promise of 500-600 corporate and research jobs. In 1999, Goodyear closed the Kelly-Springfield headquarters in Cumberland permanently, laying off 150 people.

The original plant site was returned to the City of Cumberland. Much of the factory and most of the outbuildings have been torn down. The site now houses a branch of the Cumberland YMCA and the Riverside Industrial Park.

=== Textile industry ===
Amcelle: Cumberland Celanese Facility (1924–1983).
In 1917, prior to the US entry into World War I, the U.S. War Department negotiated with Swiss inventor and businessman Camille Dreyfus to establish an acetate lacquer (commonly called "acetate dope") production facility in Cumberland. At that time, acetate dope was needed by the aircraft industry to coat and stretch the fabric on aircraft fuselages. The American Cellulose & Chemical Manufacturing Company began construction of the Cumberland facility in 1918, but the war was over before the plant could be completed. As a result, production at the Cumberland factory was shifted from producing acetate dope for the military to production of cellulose acetate yarn for the textile industry. The first acetate yarn spun in America was on Christmas Day, 1924, at the Cumberland plant. The company introduced the word "Celanese," a portmanteau of "cellulose" and "ease," as a trade name in 1925, and the company itself took this name in 1927. Celanese acetate was introduced as "Artificial Silk." In 1926, a weaving mill was established in the Cumberland plant to develop acetate-containing fabrics on a commercial scale. This mill included equipment that could dye and weave the new fibers successfully.

George A. Myers, who would become a plant labor leader, Congress of Industrial Organizations union organizer, and later a prominent member of the Communist Party, worked at the Celanese in its early years. An oral history by Myers relates:

Working conditions were brutal. A 56-hour week with even more forced overtime – all for a straight-time wage of twenty-two-and-a-half cents an hour. The workload was a killer, the heat intense and the air badly polluted...A substantial minority of Celanese workers came from union families, mainly coal miners and railroad workers. So it wasn’t very long before we began talking union. By 1936, after three year’s of intense struggle that included several plant-wide strikes and a number of sit-downs, we forced the company to grudgingly recognize the union and we became Local 1874 of the Textile Workers affiliated with the Committee of Industrial Organizations led by John L. Lewis.

During World War II, the Celanese plant produced Fortisan, a yarn used in parachutes, and butadiene, a chemical used in synthetic rubber. Wartime production drove employment to a peak of 13,000 workers at the plant. It also inflicted significant wear and tear on the facility.

After the war, the company invested millions to replace machinery. Shortly thereafter, in 1949, a depression struck the U.S. textile industry, forcing mass layoffs. In the ensuing years, the plant scrapped various production lines, and the company shifted some production to newer plants in Texas, Virginia, and South Carolina. By the 1970s, the company also had plants overseas. Production at Cumberland continued to shrink and change. In 1974, Celanese established a Cytrel Tobacco Supplement plant in Cumberland with a peak capacity of 20 million lbs a year, while maintaining acetate production, shutting down colored yarn operations, and instituting further mass layoffs. By the mid-70s, fewer than 1,000 workers were employed at the plant.

In the early 1980s, one round of layoffs after another swept the plant, as management announced temporary shutdowns, blaming a "depressed marketplace and little demand for acetate and triacetate yarn." The company finally closed its Cumberland plant in 1983.

== Post-industrial ==
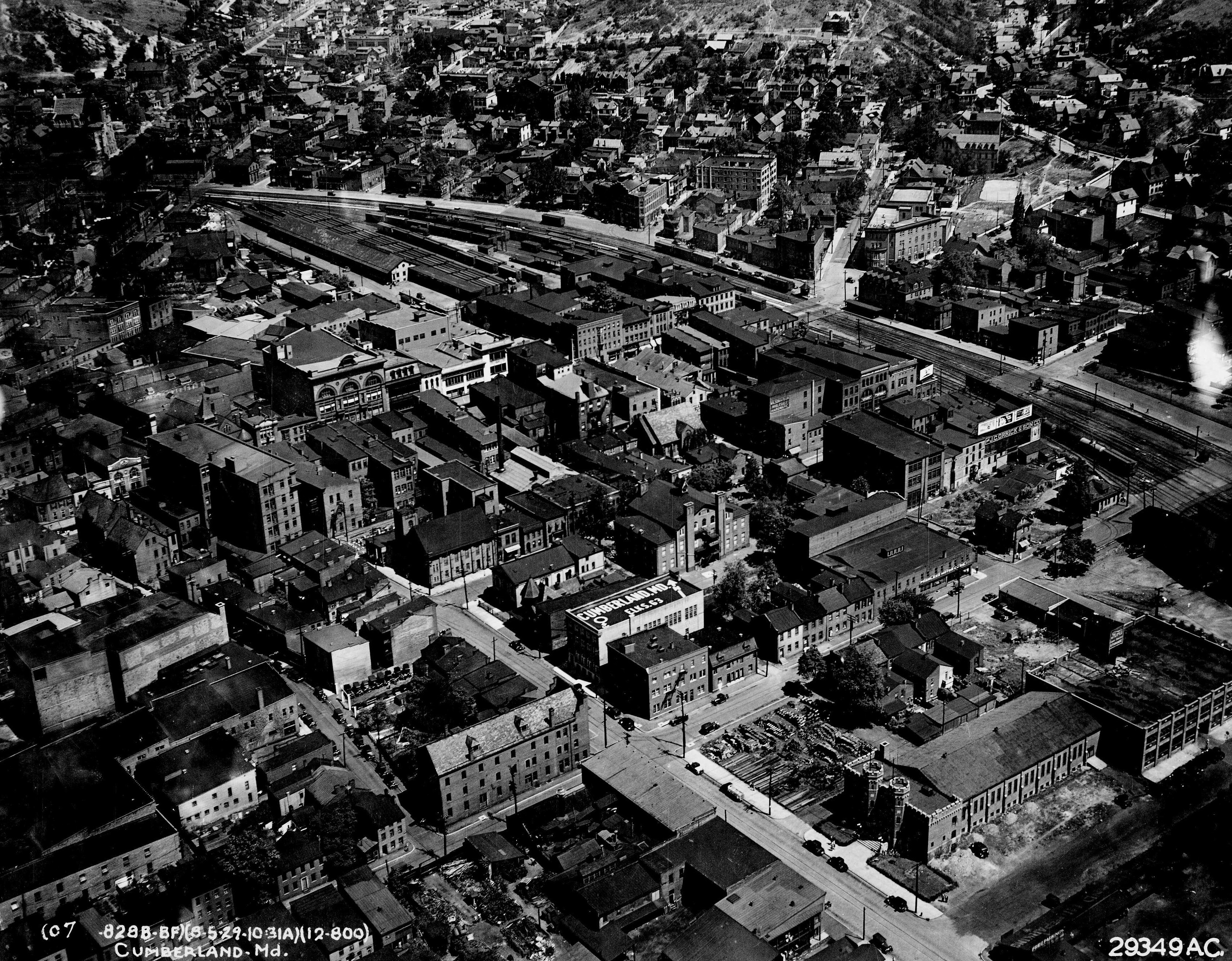
Downtown Cumberland, 1945

The 20th century witnessed major changes in Cumberland's economy. Losing out to competition from the faster-moving railroad, the C&O Canal declined in importance until it closed in 1924. The railroad industry also suffered from competition from other modes of transportation in the 20th century. Traditional industries such as glass making, textiles, and breweries lost ground or disappeared. Nevertheless, manufacturing remained the major source of employment in the city and Allegany County as a whole until the mid-1980s.

Plant layoffs and closures during the 1970s and 1980s signaled industrial decline for the city, reaching its nadir with the final closures of the Celanese and Kelly-Springfield plants. A major reason for these closures was the emergence of new technologies that rendered older industrial processes and equipment obsolete. In the 1990s, Kelly-Springfield was absorbed by parent company Goodyear and moved its corporate headquarters to Akron, Ohio, another setback for the city’s economy. The last of the "Big Four" employers, the NewPage (formerly MeadWestvaco) which operated the paper mill 18 miles (29 km) southwest of Cumberland in Luke, Maryland. closed in June 2020.

Cumberland experienced the same fate as many American cities in the latter quarter of the 20th century. Many industries closed their doors, leading to significant out-migration during this period, but Cumberland natives remained resilient.

Today, the population of the Cumberland area has stabilized, with a small decline in the city's population due primarily to sprawling of residents into the rural areas outside the city limits.

Many service-related industries have emerged over the past 20 years, particularly in the areas of tourism and entertainment, focusing around Cumberland's rich history, natural beauty, and cultural resources. Between 2001 and 2005 alone, the Cumberland arts, entertainment, and recreation industry has grown by 29.2 percent.

Cumberland's economy has yet to significantly recover from the setbacks of the late 20th century. The Cumberland, MD-WV Metropolitan Statistical Area is one of the poorest in the nation, ranked 305th out of 318 metropolitan areas in per capita income.

== Timeline for Cumberland ==
- 1728: Earliest record of a settlement along Wills Creek named after Indian Will
- 1749: Ohio Company establishes small fortified posts at Wills Creek Nemacolin's path blazed and cleared by Nemacolin, a Delaware chief, and Thomas Cresap, a Maryland frontiersman for the Ohio Company
- 1754: Fort Cumberland constructed by militiamen. French and Indian War begins
- 1755
  - Braddock Expedition launched from Fort Cumberland to capture Fort Duquesne from the French. Braddock Road cut through the wilderness following Nemacolin's path
  - George Washington appointed Commander of the Virginia Regiment stationed at Fort Cumberland following General Braddock's death
- 1775: American Revolutionary War (1775–1783)
- 1789: Allegany County, Maryland created from Washington County, Maryland.
- 1795: Federal government sited post office at Cumberland
- 1799: First Allegany County Public School incorporated
- 1811: National Road construction begins following the same route as Braddock Road from Fort Cumberland to Fort Necessity
- 1812: War of 1812
- 1815: City of Cumberland incorporated
- 1818: National Road completed from Cumberland to Wheeling, West Virginia
- 1828: Chesapeake and Ohio Canal construction begins
- 1835: Georges Creek Coal and Iron Company formed
- 1839: National Road completed from Cumberland to Vandalia, Illinois
- 1842: Baltimore and Ohio Railroad reaches Cumberland
- 1850
  - Chesapeake & Ohio Canal reaches Cumberland
  - Emmanuel Episcopal Church built
- 1861: American Civil War (1861–1865)
- 1862: Confederate cavalry entered Cumberland
- 1871: Queen City Hotel built
- 1872: Allegany County is the third most populated county in the state leading to the formation of Garrett County, Maryland from Allegany County, Maryland
- 1873
  - Allegany County coal miners established Protective and Benevolent Association
  - Baltimore & Ohio Railroad opens Deer Park Hotel, Garrett County
- 1874: City Hall & Academy of Music built (destroyed by fire in 1910)
- 1877: Baltimore & Ohio Railroad strike; workers went on strike along line and stopped rail service at Cumberland, rioters attacked state troops in Baltimore that were headed to Cumberland
- 1878: History of Cumberland (Maryland) published by Lowdermilk
- 1880: Warren Glass Works Company founded (operating until 1913 under various names)
- 1884: Cumberland Glass Works founded (operating until 1920 under various names)
- 1889: Floodwaters inundated Cumberland
- 1890
  - Cumberland Brewing Company founded (1890–1958)
  - Second National Bank constructed on Baltimore St
- 1891: Cumberland Electric Railway Opened (1891–1924)
- 1893
  - Old Allegany Courthouse burns down, City Hall used as temporary Courthouse
  - Construction of new Allegany Courthouse designed by Wright Butler begins
- 1897: Rosenbaum Brothers Department Store built (1899–1973)
- 1901: German Brewing Company founded (1901–1974)
- 1906: Western Maryland Railway reaches Cumberland
- 6 October 1907, a local man, William Burns in lynched by a mob that had pulled him from his jail cell.
- 1910: City Hall and Academy of Music destroyed by fire
- 1911
  - Present day City Hall built
  - Brush Tunnel finished
- 1912
  - First National Bank constructed on Baltimore St
  - Cumberland Bone Cave discovered
- 1913: Western Maryland Railway Station opens
- 1914: World War I (1914–1918)
- 1917: Fort Cumberland Hotel built
- 1921
  - The Kelly Springfield Tire Company opens tire factory in Cumberland
  - Anna C. McCleave becomes one of the first police and fire commissioners in the United States when the Cumberland City Council and Mayor selected her to fill an unexpired term.
- 1924
  - First acetate yarn spun in America at Cumberland Amcelle factory
  - Floods in Cumberland
- 1929: Stock market crash ushers in the Great Depression
- 1936
  - Congress of Industrial Organizations (CIO) strike led to riot, Cumberland
  - Floods at Cumberland, National Guard called in
  - Celanese workers, represented by Textile Workers Union of America, ratify first collective bargaining agreement
- 1937: Kelly-Springfield workers vote to join the United Rubber Workers of America
- 1939: World War II (1939–1945)
- 1942: Floods in Cumberland
- 1950
  - Cumberland flood control system construction begins (finished in 1959)
  - Cumberland City Council adopts ordinance requiring Communists to register with the city and prohibiting the distribution of Communist literature; arrests ensue
- 1951: Cumberland anti-Communist ordinance declared unconstitutional
- 1961
  - Cumberland Glass Company, the last hand-blown glass operation, closes
  - Allegany Community College opens
- 1964: A B-52 Stratofortress carrying two nuclear bombs crashes 17 miles (27 km) southwest of Cumberland, near Lonaconing, MD in neighboring Garrett County.
- 1972
  - Queen City Hotel demolished
  - Washington Street Historic District nominated to the National Register of Historic Places
- 1974: Queen City Brewing Company closes
- 1976: Baltimore St paved with bricks creating an outdoor pedestrian mall
- 1981: Country Club Mall opens
- 1983
  - Celanese textile plant closes
  - Downtown Cumberland is designated a historic district by the National Register of Historic Places
- 1987
  - Kelly-Springfield Tire Company plant closes
  - Maryland Governor William Donald Schaeffer secures agreement to locate Kelly-Springfield corporate offices in Cumberland
- 1993: Canal Place Heritage Area established
- 1996: The Great Snowstorm of '96
- 1999: Kelly-Springfield corporate headquarters closes
- 2006: Great Allegheny Passage opens in Cumberland
- 2009: Western Maryland Regional Medical Center opens
