= Fairhope (disambiguation) =

Fairhope may refer to:

- Fairhope, Alabama
  - Fairhope High School, a public high school
- Fairhope Township, Somerset County, Pennsylvania
- Fairhope, Pennsylvania, an unincorporated community in Somerset County
- Fairhope Plantation, a historic plantation house near Uniontown, Alabama
