= History of Keyser, West Virginia =

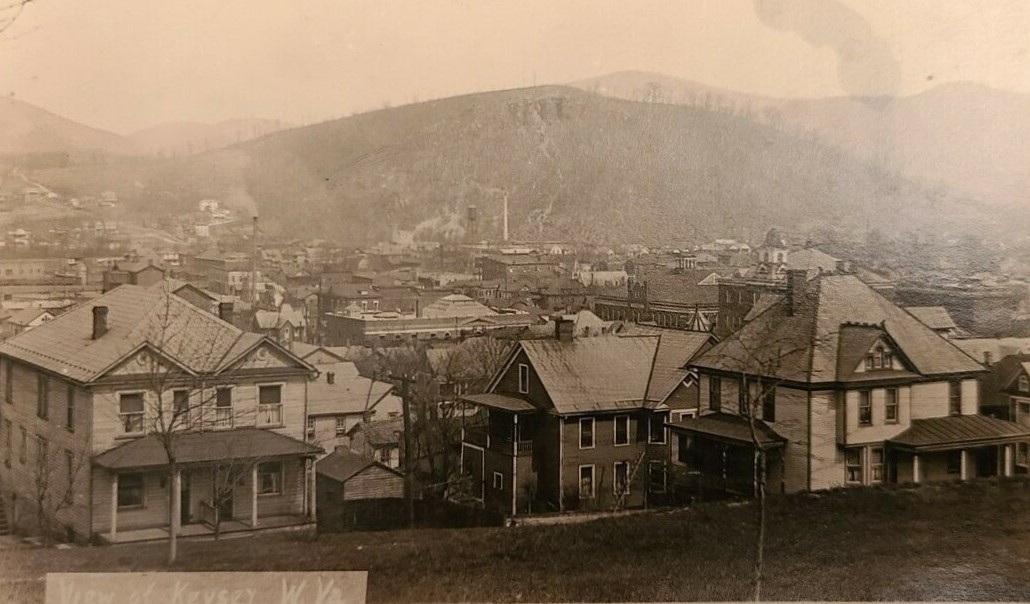
View of Keyser in 1923

Keyser, West Virginia, the county seat of Mineral County, is located on the North Branch of the Potomac River at its juncture with New Creek in the Eastern Panhandle of West Virginia. The town went through three name changes, ultimately being named after William Keyser, a Baltimore and Ohio Railroad official.

== Founding ==
The first Europeans to pass through what would become Keyser are believed to have been William Mayo and George Savage, sent by Lord Fairfax in 1736 to seek out the source of the Potomac River. The first local land grant was issued by Fairfax to Christopher Beelor on March 20, 1752.

The place was first called Paddy Town, for Patrick McCarty, an Irish immigrant who came to what was then Hampshire County, Virginia, sometime after 1740. Eventually, a community developed, which was also known as "the Irish Settlement." Initially a peaceful village, Paddy Town came under repeated attacks by Native Americans after French and Indian forces defeated Major General Edward Braddock west of Paddy Town in 1755. The Paddy Towners built stockades and blockhouses to protect themselves. In 1762, Patrick McCarty was killed by a band of Native Americans while harvesting crops.

Patrick McCarty's son, Edward McCarty, further developed the town after his father's death. Among other things, he built an iron furnace and foundry and a salt well, near present-day Armstrong Street. According to an 1851 newspaper article, during the Revolutionary War, "there were extensive borings for salt at Paddytown, on the Virginia side of the Potomac, and that after reaching a depth of 600 feet, the supply of salt water was abundant, from which large quantities of this article was manufactured."

The Paddy Town, Virginia, post office was established on October 30, 1811. The McCarty family built a stone house in 1815, still standing today at Keys Street in Keyser. A travel guide described the town in these formative years:

Paddytown, Va. post office vacant 1835. Is a small, romantic village, 214 miles from Richmond and 135 miles Northwest from Washington. Has 6 dwelling houses, 1 mercantile store, 1 manufacturing flour mill, and in immediate vicinity 1 forge and iron furnace. Romantic scenery, especially Slim Bottom Hill (Queen's Point). Lands in immediate vicinity belong to James Singleton.

As the Chesapeake and Ohio Canal (C&O Canal) was constructed alongside the Potomac from Washington, DC, to Cumberland, Maryland, a resident of the Potomac valley wrote to the editors of the National Intelligencer in Washington in 1837, seeking to make a sale:

At a place called Paddy Town, the residence of the late Col. Edward McCarty, on the North branch, 25 miles above Cumberland, stands an excellent furnace and forge, for making iron, now idle for want of capital and skill to work them. These may be said to stand in the great coal region of the Potomack, or so near that the coal can be delivered at them for 3 cents per bushel. Col. McCarty, who built them, and who was a man of great enterprise, failed by attempting too much at once without sufficient skill.

The C&O Canal was originally planned to reach the Ohio River, but the canal never reached Paddy Town, let alone the Ohio. After being overtaken by the railroad, the canal stopped as far west as Cumberland.

By 1844, Paddy Town fell into decline when the original post office closed. The town received an economic boost in 1852 when the Baltimore & Ohio Railroad, in search of a path through the Allegheny mountains, arrived. The Paddy Town post office was re-established that year, with Edward Hitchcock McDonald as postmaster. McDonald's wife, Cornelia Peak McDonald, was an educated socialite from Alexandria, Virginia. She found the name "Paddy Town" to be "unaesthetic and wholly unacceptable." Due to her persistent lobbying, the Post Office Department in 1855 renamed the town's post office as Wind Lea, Virginia. Sometime between 1855 and the start of the Civil War in 1861, however, the townsfolk renamed the village New Creek Station, after the creek that runs by it. This decision was supposedly "by common consent" to give the town a "more dignified" name.

== New Creek and the American Civil War ==
In 1861, at the start of the American Civil War, the Union established Fort Fuller on the present site of Potomac State College of West Virginia University. At that time, the town was in Hampshire County, Virginia. The fort's commanders included Majors Lew Wallace, the author of Ben-Hur: A Tale of the Christ, and Benjamin Harrison, who would later become the 23rd President of the United States. The area changed hands 14 times during the war due to the importance of the railroad. One history describes "four years of carnage" at New Creek . . . everything was laid to waste. What buildings of importance had been built, many of which were equal to those of other towns in that day, were razed to the ground or reduced to ashes, by the relentless flames of the military incendiary." The railroad that had been a blessing to the town had turned into a curse, drawing repeated assaults by Confederate forces.

A Harrisonburg, Virginia, newspaper provided a report of the exploits at New Creek of a Confederate company known as the Brook's Gap Rifles, which had been stationed at Romney in the summer of 1861:

A part of the company – 18 members, a detachment under command of Lieut. Philip Kennon – participated in the fight at New Creek Station, heretofore known as Paddytown, on the Balt. & O. Railroad, in Hampshire county. In this skirmish these sharp-shooters did first-rate work, private Black himself killing three of the enemy with his rifle, and private John W. West giving another a load of buckshot in the face. Black, who is a splendid equestrian as well as a "deadshot," charged up on the platform at the Station, riding on 7 or 8 feet. The enemy then drived into a house in which our boys peppered them, killing 5 or 6 with their deadly Minnie Rifles, which they handle with terrible precision.

Because of its geography, a relatively flat plain in a valley surrounded by mountains and open to many approaches, New Creek was an easy target for Confederates. One editor in Wheeling, West Virginia, opined that holding New Creek was useless, writing in 1863:

The concentration of troops at New Creek and the preparations there for attack or siege, indicate that it is the intention of our military authorities to hold that post against rebel investment … New Creek … really protects nothing but the little valley which its guns command. It cannot prevent the progress of the rebels into Pennsylvania or into Western Virginia … We do not undertake to say what points could be made to protect West Virginia or Western Pennsylvania. We only express the opinion, in which we are not alone, that New Creek is not one of them … It is to be hoped the folly of Winchester is not to be repeated at New Creek – of holding a useless and indefensible position, which if not in the enemy's country now could easily be made so by their getting in its rear.

The town was constantly raided by Confederate forces. In January 1864, according to one report, a rebel force of 3,000 cavalry was headed in the direction of New Creek, and New Creek residents "were forbidden to exhibit lights" after dark.

New Creek's defenses were overcome on November 28, 1864, when between 1,500 and 2,000 Confederates defeated a small garrison of Union troops stationed behind earthworks at Fort Fuller. The Confederates then took over the town, destroying the earthworks and nearly all the buildings, except the home of Colonel Edward Armstrong, whom they knew to be a Confederate officer. A smaller Confederate force was then sent to Piedmont, where they managed to burn the Baltimore and Ohio Railroad's roundhouse, a workshop, and other machinery before they were turned away by Company A Sixth West Virginia Volunteers.

The residents of New Creek were terrorized by the November 1864 occupation. Men were captured and taken away. One eyewitness complained of the rebels' behavior:

[T]he chief thief among the rebels was a drunken, blear-eyed, pug nosed Major Mason, son of Ex-Senator James M. Mason. This fellow searched and robbed with his own hands eighteen or twenty citizen prisoners, taking everything of value found upon their persons. Although thrice ordered by General Rosser to send his prisoners to the front, he refused to obey until he had finished his pocket picking. After leaving New Creek, the rebels put the prisoners on the double-quick and ran them through the mud for about three miles. When any of the prisoners would attempt to avoid a miry place in the road, which they frequently did, they were rewarded for their care by a slap across the head or shoulders with a sabre. A great many prisoners made their escape along the route. The [rebels] nearly all got stone blind drunk, and they had about as much as they could do to look after the mule's load of booty which each of them carried. They had also lost a great deal of rest previous to the attack on New Creek, and for these reasons the men were not very watchful. That old hero, Abijah Dolly, formerly a member of the Legislature, was one of the prisoners taken from New Creek. He made his escape, ran on ahead of the rebels, reached his farm, and drove off and concealed all his stock before the rebel advance came up.

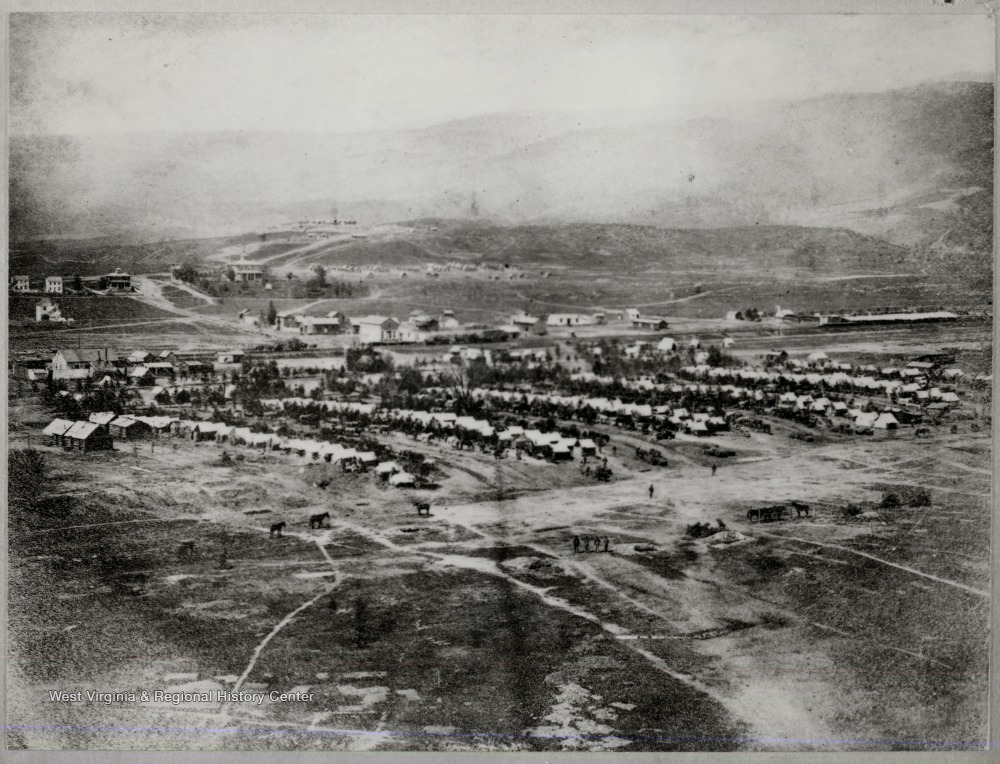
Encampment of the 22nd Pennsylvania Cavalry at New Creek, 1865. The hill with Fort Fuller can be seen in the distance.

During the war, in 1863, with the formation of West Virginia, the town found itself in a new state. Likely because this northern half of Hampshire County had stronger pro-Union sentiments and Romney was often occupied by Confederates, the new West Virginia legislature moved the county seat from Romney to Piedmont, a few miles up the Potomac from New Creek, until the war ended. Following the war, the state legislature sent the Hampshire County seat back to Romney and split this northern half away to form Mineral County in 1866. Debate ensued over whether Piedmont or New Creek should be the county seat.

At this time, Confederate Colonel Edward McCarty Armstrong, a New Creek citizen, returned from the war and sold his holdings in and around the town to three Davis brothers from Piedmont: Henry Gassaway Davis, William Davis, and Colonel Thomas B. Davis. The Davis brothers set about making the most of their real estate investment, knowing its value would increase if New Creek became the county seat and a greater hub of activity. They donated a major plot of land to the county court for the construction of a courthouse. The court enthusiastically accepted, and New Creek became Mineral's county seat. Until then, the court met in an abandoned Union army hospital on the river bank. The stone courthouse was completed in 1868, was remodeled in 1896, and stands in use to this day.

== Incorporation of Keyser ==
The courthouse question was not the only field of competition between Piedmont and New Creek, as the towns sought to develop in these post-war years. In 1874, the Baltimore & Ohio Railroad was looking for a place to set up division headquarters. Once again, the town of New Creek won out. The town's trump card was its willingness to change its name, having already gone from Paddy Town to Wind Lea to New Creek. Thus, on November 16, 1874, the town of Keyser was incorporated. William Keyser was then the first vice president of the railroad, living in nearby Garrett County, Maryland, and in charge of the headquarters location division. The honor was too much to resist. In addition to the headquarters, the renamed town of Keyser received repair shops and a roundhouse, lifting employment and economic activity. The town grew. New Creek would henceforth refer to an unincorporated community along the eponymous body of water just south of Keyser. The southern part of Keyser was known as South Keyser, a town unto itself. It would be combined with Keyser proper in 1913, when the state granted a charter to the City of Keyser.

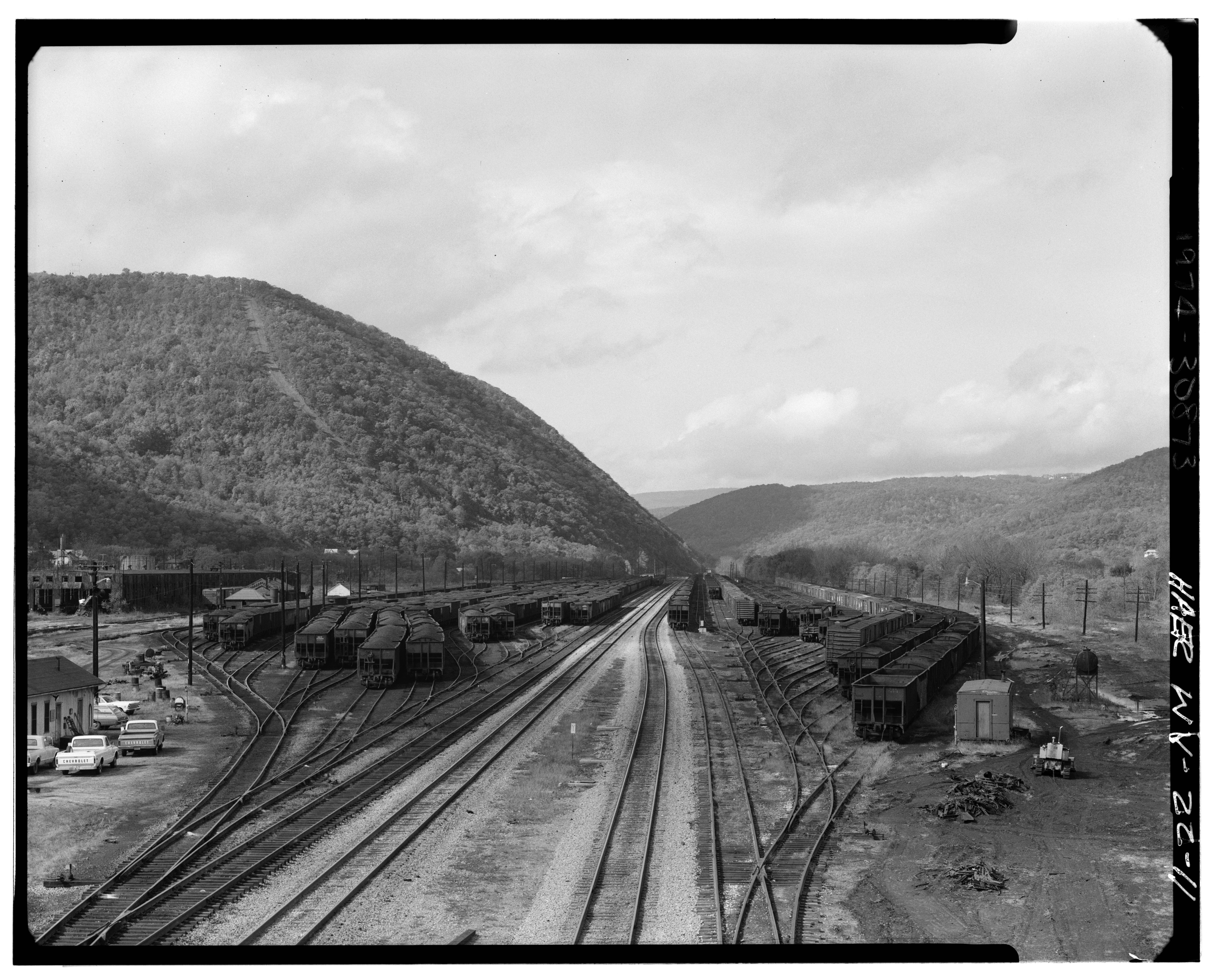
B&O Railroad Yards at Keyser

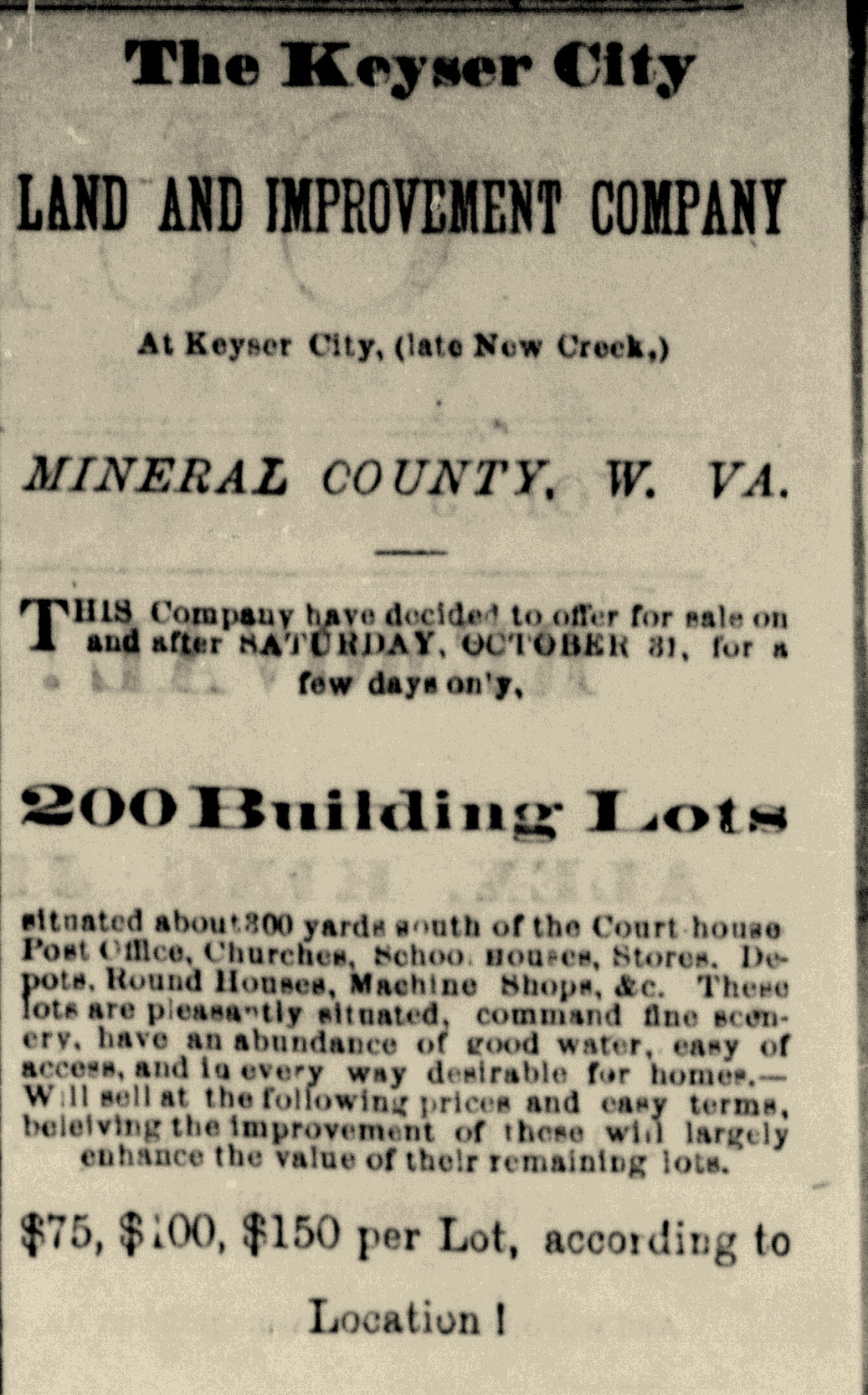
Early advertisement for land in Keyser, from the Cumberland Daily Times, April 23, 1875.

The first mayor of Keyser was J.T. Hoke, elected unopposed with 127 votes on January 7, 1875.

== Great Railroad Strike of 1877 ==
Keyser played an early and prominent role in the Great Railroad Strike of 1877. That year, in the midst of a deep nationwide depression ("the Long Depression") that had caused extensive unemployment and hunger, the Baltimore & Ohio Railroad cut its employees' wages by 10 percent. On July 16, trainmen in Martinsburg, West Virginia, were the first to take action, uncoupling a cattle train and announcing no more trains would run through until the wage cuts were restored. West Virginia Governor Henry M. Mathews sent militia under Colonel Charles J. Faulkner to restore order, but was unsuccessful largely due to militia sympathies with the workers. The strike spread up and down the line and eventually across the entire country. Within two days, workers in Keyser—both black and white—voted to strike together, announcing:

Resolved, that we, the men of the Third Division, have soberly and calmly considered the step we have taken, and declare that at the present state of wages which the company have imposed upon us, we cannot live and provide our wives and children with the necessities of life, and that we only ask for wages that will enable us to provide such necessaries.

The Boston Globe reported on July 18, 1877: "At Keyser a strike occurred this afternoon. The strikers threatened to shoot new men that take places on the road. No freight trains were sent from there." On July 20, a train from Cumberland, Maryland, arrived in Keyser and was sent onto a side track, and strikers removed the crew with force. That same day, federal troops arrived in Keyser to try to break the strike. The Philadelphia Times reported of events in Keyser: "The second troop train has just arrived here. A few men are around the station, but all is quiet. The men are firm in their determination not to run out any trains, but they will hardly attempt to stop others, as there is abundant military force." However, by July 30, some 25 freight trains had piled up in Keyser. That night a "misplaced switch" sent one of the trains off the tracks. The next day, under heavy military escort courtesy of U.S. President Rutherford B. Hayes, trains began moving out of Keyser. The Baltimore Sun reported:

The troops at Keyser and Piedmont were deployed along the line of railroad property, keeping the crowds back at a considerable distance. No one [not] identified in the immediate employment of the company could pass the guard, and even the most irrepressible reporters found it necessary to make the most lengthy explanation of their privileges in order to pass the line. The strikers being kept back by the military, there was not the slightest interference with any of the trains . . . . The movement of the trains over this division has caused quite a general break among the strikers, and they are now constantly coming and asking to be set to work.

Replacement workers were found, lured by Baltimore & Ohio vice president William Keyser's offer of fifty dollars for each strikebreaker. Meanwhile, any striker who approached the trains, now protected with military force, was immediately arrested. The Baltimore & Ohio Railroad refused to rehire any of the leaders, and criminal investigations and prosecution of the strikers started:

The authorities are endeavoring to detect the parties who threw the train off the track last night but have no clue as yet. Sheriff Simms has offered a reward of fifty dollars for the arrest of Joseph Lane, who escaped this morning. Lane was a ringleader of the striking firemen. The crowd that was arrested for attempting to ride free to Piedmont from here had a hearing before Mayor Shay this afternoon. Sixteen of them were discharged. Z. Knight, James Dixon, John Ravenscraft, and John Ashey were fined from three to ten dollars each and costs for carrying pistols, knives, and billies. Several of the parties were from the mining regions. Thomas Goff, as striking fireman, who led the crowd was fined ten dollars and costs and confined thirty days in jail, that being the extent of municipal authority. The others were sent to jail til they pay the fines.

After three days of intense fighting along the line, the strike was broken in Keyser, with traffic moving again on August 1, 1877. Baltimore & Ohio vice president William Keyser, after whom the town had just three years earlier named itself, refused to accept the workers' demands. The wage cuts stood, but the strike spurred the burgeoning U.S. labor movement to begin organizing for both economic and political power, having seen courts, military deployments, arrests and imprisonment employed against the strikers.

Across the Potomac from Piedmont, in Westernport, Maryland, in the heat of the uprising, workers posted the following handbill, illustrating the desperation and militancy of the strike in this area:

WE SHALL CONQUER OR WE SHALL DIE Strike and Live! Bread we must have! Remain and perish! Be it understood, if the Baltimore & Ohio Railroad Company does not meet the demands of the employees at an early date, the officials will hazard their lives and endanger their property, for we shall run their trains and locomotives into the river; we shall blow up their bridges; we shall tear up their railroads; we shall consume their shops with fire and ravage their hotels with desperation. A company that has from time to time so unmercifully cut our wages and finally has reduced us to starvation, for such we have, has lost all sympathy. We have humbled ourselves from time to time to unjust demands until our children cry for bread. A company that knows all this, we should ask in the name of high heaven what more do they want -- our blood? They can get our lives. We are willing to sacrifice them, not for the company, but for our rights. Call out your armed hosts if you want them. Shield yourselves if you can, and remember that no foe, however dreaded, can repel us for a moment. Our determination may seem frail, but let it come. They may think our cause is weak. Fifteen thousand noble miners, who have been insulted and put upon by this self same company, are at our backs. The merchants and community at large along the whole line of the roads are on our side, and the working classes of every State in the Union are in our favor, and we feel confident that the God of the poor and the oppressed of the earth is with us. Therefore let the clashing of arms be heard; let the fiery elements be poured out if they think it right, but in heed of our right and in defence of our families, we shall conquer or we shall die.[29]

== Late 19th and early 20th centuries ==
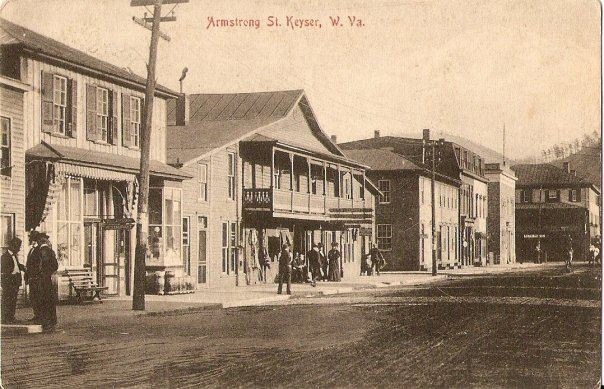
Armstrong Street in Keyser, early 1900s.

Keyser's growth accelerated in the 1880s, with the end of the Long Depression, through the turn of the century. The first high school opened in 1885. The first bank in town, the National Bank of Keyser, was chartered in 1886. A town water system was built in 1892, as was the first telephone line, connecting Keyser to Burlington, West Virginia. The Keyser Light and Power Company brought electricity to the town in 1895. A fire department, the Vigilant Reel and Hose Company No. 1, was organized in 1896. The Hoffman Hospital opened in 1904, as did the Preparatory School, which would later become Potomac State College. Both of these were located on Fort Hill, the site of Fort Fuller during the Civil War. A natural gas system powered street lamps and provided heating beginning in 1905. An ornate music hall opened for entertainment.

In 1888, Thomas R. Carskadon, who had been a shareholder of the Keyser Land and Improvement Company that sold the plots that would become much of downtown Keyser, ran for governor of West Virginia on the Prohibition Party ticket, but was not elected. A newspaper article described his pro-temperance views as unpopular, but that voters liked to listen to his "characteristic, sound, humorous, eloquent, and happy speeches, which held his audience spellbound to the close." In 1900, Carskadon ran unsuccessfully for the vice presidential nomination of the Prohibition Party. Later that year, he had a second unsuccessful campaign for Governor of West Virginia.

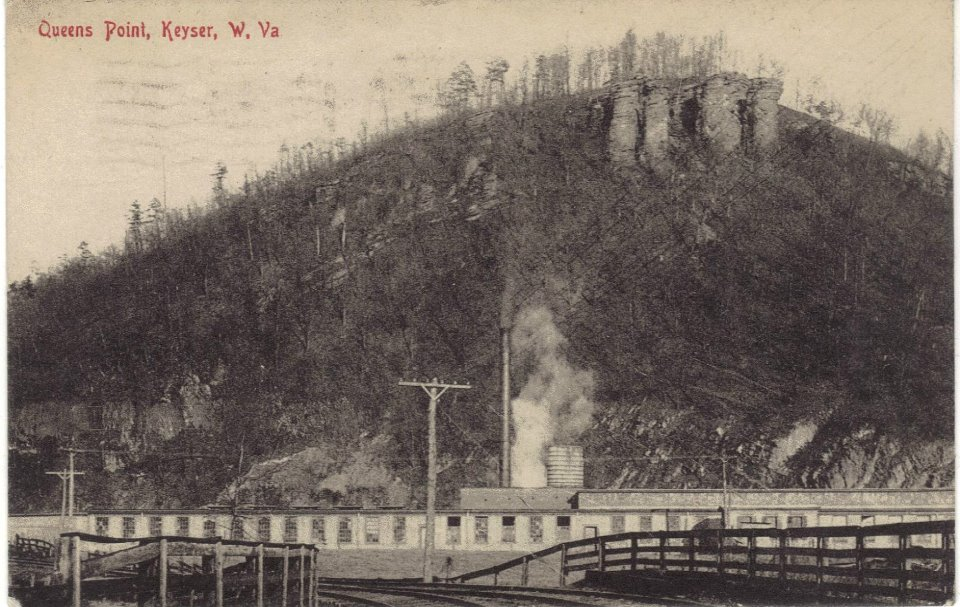
The Potomac Worsted Woolen Mill in Keyser, 1908. The mill went through various owners and names through the years, including Patchett, Potomac, and Keyser Worsted. Queens Point is visible in the background.

Infrastructure improvements attracted more industry, and Keyser's private sector began to diversify beyond its sometimes problematic dominant employer, the Baltimore & Ohio. Besides the B&O, railroad workers were now employed by the Western Maryland Railroad and the West Virginia Central Railroad, started by the Davis brothers and their in-law Senator Stephen Elkins in the 1880s. The Keyser Woolen Mills began operations in 1893. Rees' tannery operated on New Creek. In 1905, the Keyser Pottery Company began producing decorative and bathroom ceramics along the Potomac River.

In 1903, another woolen mill, specializing in worsted wool, was opened on the banks of the Potomac in the shadow of Queens Point, the machines largely being worked by the women of Keyser. In the early 1920s, the mill employed 200 workers, 175 of whom were women. In later years, sometime before 1946, the workers voted to join Textile Workers Union of America Local 1874, the same local that organized workers at the much larger Celanese plant near Cumberland.

As Keyser's industry boomed, so did its population and its need for labor, attracting European immigrants. The largest group of foreign-born Keyser residents in this era was Italian, followed by the Irish. In 1910, a single quarry operation near Keyser alone housed dozens of Italian men in its boarding facilities. News of jobs traveled through family and village networks. Many Italians settling in Keyser and nearby Piedmont hailed from the same Calabrian village, Caulonia. The Immigration Act of 1924, a restrictive national immigration law, had at least two significant effects on Keyser. First, while the town's population had more than doubled between 1900 and 1920, the population leveled out in the following decade despite the economic growth of the Roaring Twenties. Second, many of the Cauloniesi emigrated to Adelaide, Australia, so that many descendants of Keyser's Italian families now have relatives there, with the same Italian family names being found in both cities.

On February 3, 1913, the West Virginia legislature granted Keyser a charter designating it the "City of Keyser". The legislation consolidated Keyser with South Keyser and added further territory to the newly chartered city. Until this time, Keyser had functioned under a general law applicable to all municipalities in West Virginia. Its size now justified a special city charter from the state. The charter laid out Keyser's form of government as well.

When the United States entered World War I in 1917, the patriotic fervor of Keyser nearly caused another change in the town's name, because of the similarity between "Keyser" and the German title "Kaiser". Proposals included Wilson (after the then-President), Pershing (after the then-general), Paddy Town (the original name), McPherson (a Civil War figure), and Fairfax-on-the-Potomac (harkening back to the original land grant). A Keyser soldier and local musician, Gene Cross, wrote a letter to the town newspaper that effectively ended the debate:

When the name Keyser appears before the mind's eye, all that we hold dear at once confronts us: the old Potomac, New Creek valley, the old B&O, Prep Hill, hospital, and all the dear old memories that surround it, and the greatest of all "Her People." By robbing the town of that name, you rob her of all these things to a certain extent, because when you think of the name, all these things flash across one's mind … There is lots of good work that these people could use their spare time, energy, and brain power that needs attention far more than this question. So for the sake of the boys who are away from home and the ones who are going, let the old name stand. As we are looking forward to the time when all this international trouble will have passed away and we can come back to, not Wilson, Paddy Town, Pershing or any other, but Keyser, our boyhood Keyser.

In 1924, Keyser experienced its wettest year since 1889, and the Potomac River swelled over its banks twice in March. These floods brought widespread damage to homes and businesses in the north end of Keyser especially.

== Great Depression to Post-War Boom ==
Keyser's experience of the Great Depression in the 1930s like many other small industrial cities in the United States, included jobs losses and the closure of factories, like the Keyser Pottery Company. Even the Baltimore & Ohio repair shops were closed for an entire year due to the slump, between 1932 and 1933. New Deal programs like the Works Progress Administration (WPA) generated jobs for the unemployed. "W.P.A." stamps may still be seen on sidewalks constructed by this program in Keyser.

The Depression lifted as World War II began, in part due to wartime spending. For example, in January 1942, one month after the declaration of war, an entrepreneur from Brooklyn bought the worsted woolen mill with an aim of filling army contracts and ramped up production and employment.

After the war, Keyser experienced another boom in industry. When the woolen mill closed in 1948, moving its equipment to India, the community pulled together to lure a new business to take over the facility. When California-based Pryne and Company expressed interest, four Keyser service clubs—the Lions, Kiwanis, Rotary, and Yeoman—started a campaign to sell $100 notes to purchase the plant for the firm. They raised $60,000 in 24 hours in October 1952, and Pryne started production of electric fans. Pryne was later bought by Emerson, which moved the plant to Bennettsville, South Carolina, in 1965. Penn Ventilator, which produced louvers and ventilators for heating and air conditioning systems, then took over the plant. During these baby boom years, Keyser also featured two clothing factories, the Keyser Garment Company and the So Rite Lingerie Company. Other manufacturing concerns included an Anchor Glass plant and the Flex-O-Lite mill, which produced Blastolite beads.

In 1950, during the Red Scare, nearby Cumberland, Maryland, and Ridgeley, West Virginia, enacted ordinances requiring communists to register with the city. The Keyser American Legion post passed a motion for Keyser to do the same. The post commander said that several of his members said "they knew of Communists in Keyser and of Communist meetings." At the time, the Cumberland ordinance was under legal challenge and was ruled unconstitutional a few months later, apparently causing the Keyser efforts to be abandoned.

Following the landmark 1954 U.S. Supreme Court decision in Brown v. Board of Education, Keyser schools began integrating in the 1955–56 school year. That fall, students between grades 7 and 12 were integrated. Mineral County's school board, however, said younger students could not be integrated yet due to lack of classroom space. African-American children up to grade 6 continued to attend a segregated red brick school called Lincoln School on Church Street in Keyser. They were integrated with white students within the next two years, when Lincoln School was renovated to house the Mineral County Board of Education in the late 1950s. Later, the building became the Keyser Senior Center at 30 Church Street.

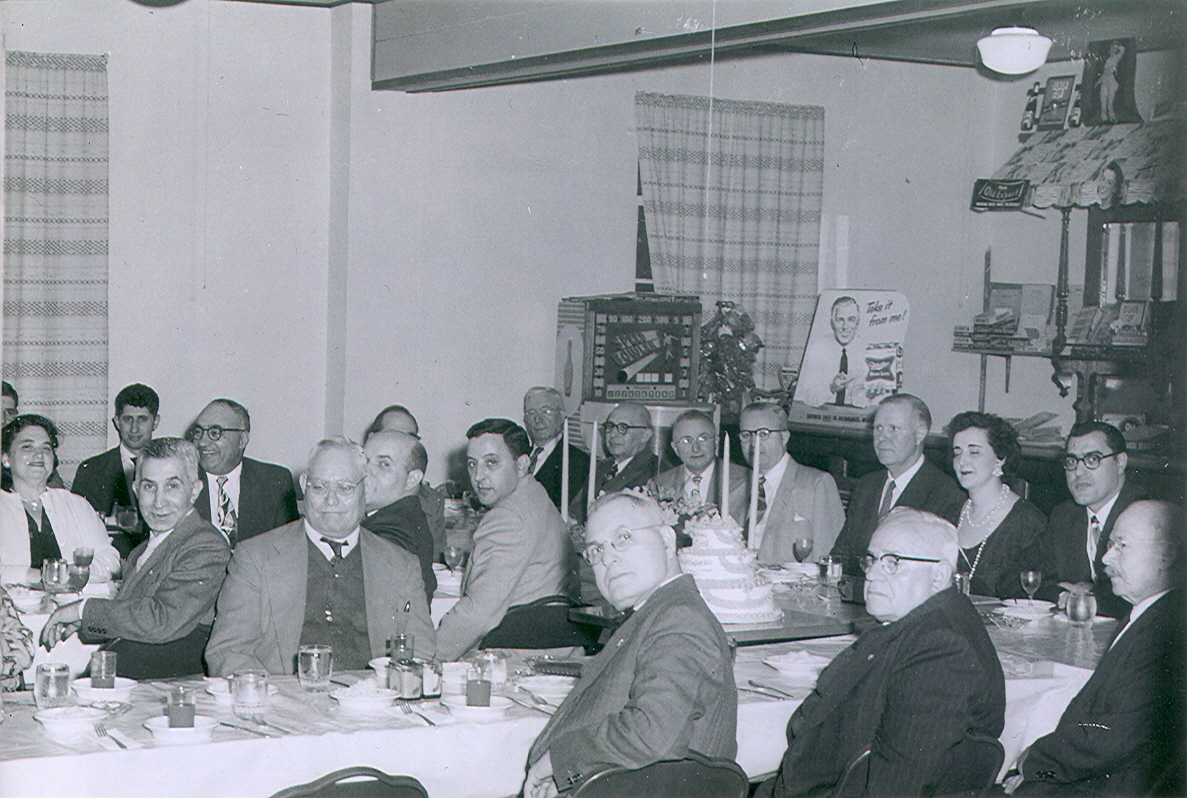
Sons of Italy dinner in Keyser circa 1950s. Seated at the head of table on right is Congressman Harley O. Staggers. The Sons of Italy was an important civic and social club for Keyser's Italian community.

High employment and rising wages marked the 1950s and 1960s. Keyser's population peaked in the 1970 census.

== Deindustrialization ==
In the 20th century, Keyser's economy relied heavily on manufacturing and the railroad. The town was hit hard by the economic crises of the 1970s and early 1980s. Brewery, glass, textile, and tire plants in Cumberland, Maryland began to close. The loss of income affected retailers and other ancillary concerns. Globalization sent firms in search of cheap labor. By the 1980s, corporate raiders became active, ultimately forcing the closure of a major tire plant, Kelly-Springfield, in Cumberland.

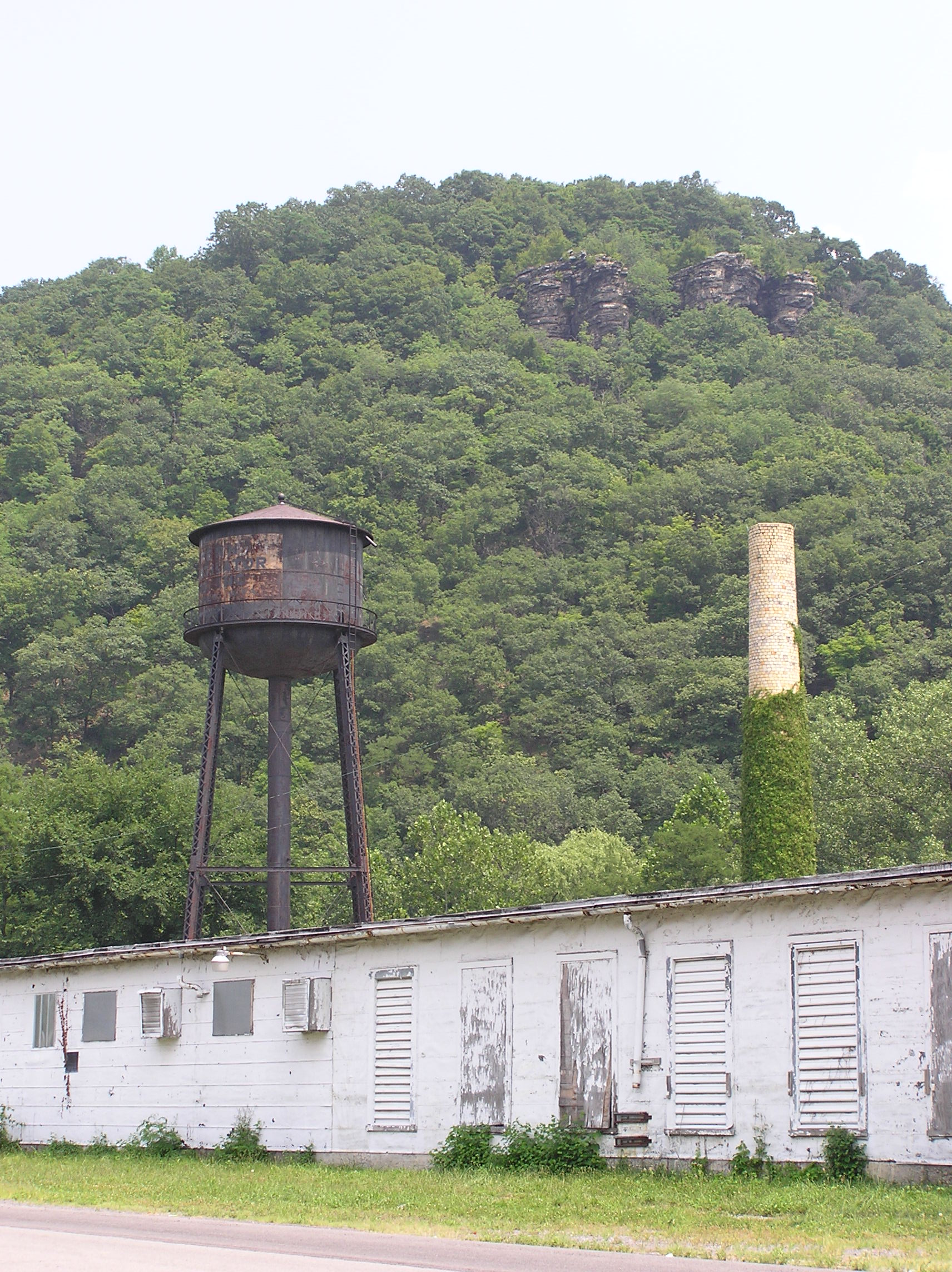
The former Penn Ventilator plant, originally a worsted woolen mill, in Keyser. The Ridgeley or Oriskany sandstone outcropping known as Queens Point towers in the background. Taken in 2005.

Many Keyser factories held on longer than the larger concerns in Cumberland, while reducing headcounts throughout this period. Eventually, however, they too began to close. In 1990, the Flex-O-Lite plant closed. The owners - the Lukens Company - claimed it was no longer profitable with high natural gas prices and "antiquated equipment." Laid off workers represented by the Aluminum, Brick and Glass Workers' International Union protested outside the plant when the company offered only $100 in severance pay for each year of service.

In 1995, both the Penn Ventilator and Anchor Glass plants closed. Many blamed this pair of closures on the North American Free Trade Agreement, which went into effect a year earlier. Like Lukens, the Penn Ventilator company blamed the closure on old equipment, claiming it would cost $7 million to upgrade the plant and "there were no concessions the local union or management could have made that would make us competitive." Anchor Glass raised similar claims, and both companies shifted their operations elsewhere. In 1997, after an attempt to save it through an employee stock ownership program, the Keyser Garment Company closed. Although Keyser's fortunes were generally tied the national economy through the centuries, the town did not experience the 1990s economic boom in the same way as other parts of the country.

== 21st century ==
Keyser's current population largely stabilized at the start of the 21st century. Since losing much of its manufacturing base, the town increased health care, education, and service jobs. Potomac State College has continued to develop and is associated with West Virginia University. A modern hospital and high school were opened. The railroad through Keyser is now operated by CSX.

The Thomas R. Carskadon House and Mineral County Courthouse are listed on the National Register of Historic Places.
