= Packsaddle Bridge =

- U.S. National Register of Historic Places
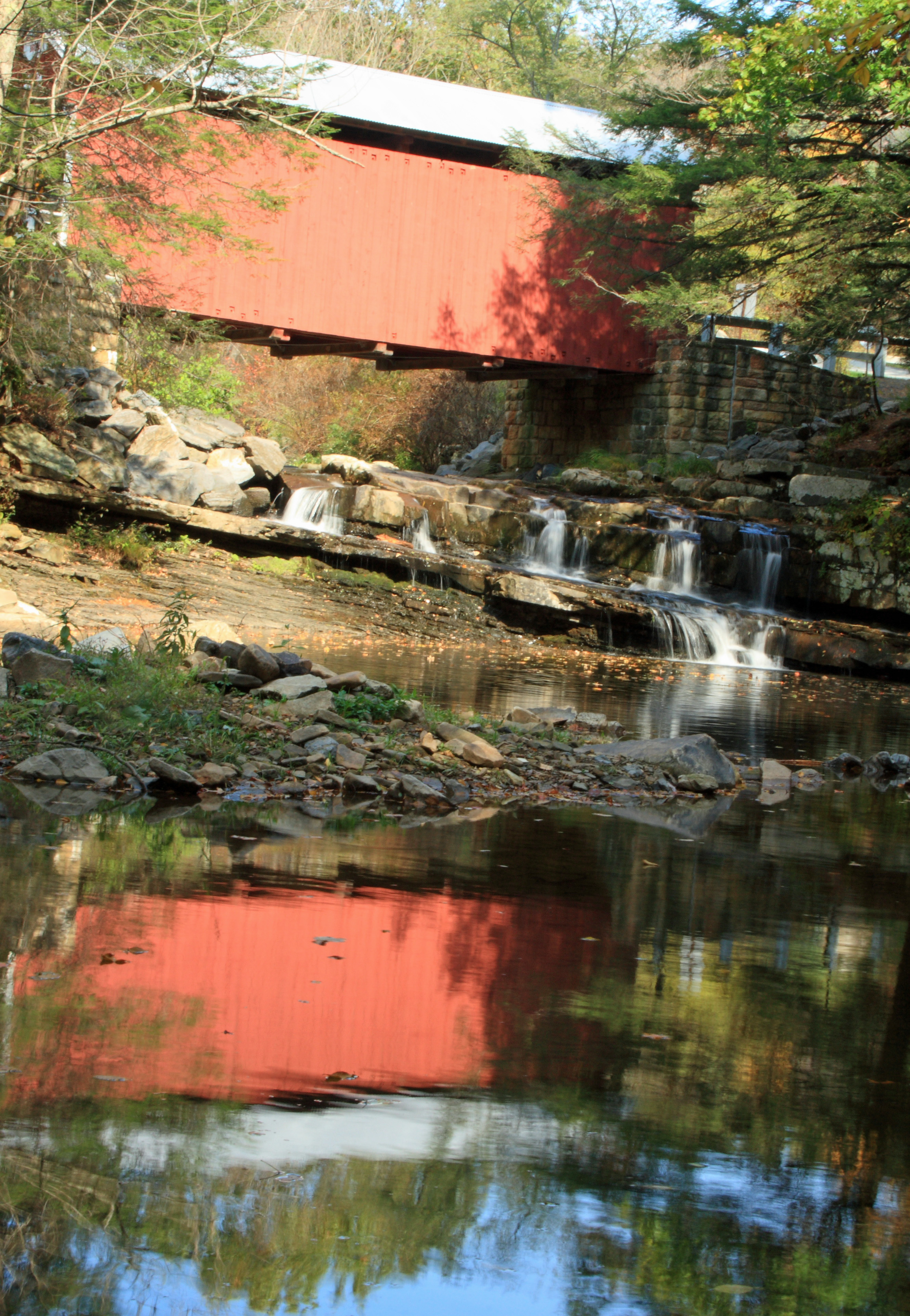
- The bridge in October 2010

- Location within Pennsylvania Location within the United States
- Location: Southwest of Glen Savage off Legislative Route 55005, Fairhope Township, Pennsylvania
- Coordinates: 39°52′4″N 78°49′3″W
- Area: 0.1 acres (0.040 ha)
- Built: 1870
- Architectural style: Kingpost truss
- MPS: Covered Bridges of Somerset County TR
- NRHP reference No.: 80003629
- Added to NRHP: December 10, 1980

The Packsaddle Bridge is a historic covered bridge in Fairhope Township, Somerset County, Pennsylvania. It was built in 1877, and is a 48-foot-long (15 m) Kingpost truss bridge, with full vertical plank siding and large cut stone abutments. The bridge crosses Brush Creek. It is one of 10 covered bridges in Somerset County.

It was added to the National Register of Historic Places in 1980.
