= Narrows Park, Maryland =

Unincorporated community in Maryland, United States

- Unincorporated community
- Location within the State of Maryland Narrows Park, Maryland (the United States)
- Coordinates: 39°40′00″N 78°48′01″W
- Country: United States
- State: Maryland
- County: Allegany
- Elevation: 719 ft (219 m)
- Time zone: UTC-5 (Eastern (EST))
  - Summer (DST): UTC-4 (EDT)
- GNIS feature ID: 590864

Narrows Park is an unincorporated community in Allegany County, Maryland, United States. Braddock Run flows into Wills Creek near Narrows Park.
