= Brush Creek (Wills Creek tributary) =

River in Pennsylvania

Coordinates: 39°50′35″N 78°48′36″W

Brush Creek is a 15.3-mile-long (24.6 km) tributary of Wills Creek in Pennsylvania in the United States.

Brush Creek drains a piece of the Allegheny Plateau in eastern Somerset County. It flows through Northampton Township and enters Wills Creek in Fairhope Township, just above the Railroad Cut Falls at Fairhope.

== See also ==
- List of rivers of Pennsylvania
