= Caiuctucuc =

Extinct Native American settlement in Maryland, US

Coordinates: 39°39′N 78°46′W

Caiuctucuc was a large village of on the western side of what is now Cumberland, Maryland, discovered between 1720 and 1730 by early European explorers. It sat at the junction of the Cohongaronta (Potomac) and the Caiuctucuc (Wills Creek) streams. Tipis and lodges lined the riverbank along present day Green Street in western Cumberland.

The village was abandoned prior to 1751 due to the ever-growing numbers of animal trappers and traders.

== Life among the indigenous villagers ==
The area was covered by Native American lodges. Many other indigenous villages remained inhabited. Caiuctucuc had been a typical village with a mixture of conical tipis and oblong lodges with a surrounding stockade for protection.

Forest land was held in common by the tribe, while the cleared land around Caiuctucuc belonged to the villagers, with each family allotted a portion. Corn, beans, tobacco, melons and gourds were cultivated. Each local village was ruled by a chief or king with absolute power who inherited his position through his mother.

The tribal council was commonly formed of the chief, his second-in-command (a warrior general) and a medicine man. The medicine man was a mixture of pastor and doctor, a very important position in a society without scientific medical knowledge.

Smoking was more or less seen in a religious sense, with each person sharing a few puffs before passing the pipe. They drank nothing but water, occasionally sweetened with maple sap, until alcohol was introduced by Europeans.

Marriage was commonly between older teenage boys and younger teenage girls. Babies were highly protected and nurtured, swaddled on a board, and carried on the back.

About 1750, pioneers moved in and renamed the village Will's Creek after a nearby Native American chief. Chief Will lived on top of Will's Knob, a mountain to the north. He claimed all the land in the area, but gladly sold large portions to the immigrants at little cost. Unlike many of his kinsman, Chief Will did not move west to escape the colonists, but accepted their presence gracefully.
