= Fairhope Township, Pennsylvania =

Township in Pennsylvania, US

Coordinates: 39°50′11″N 78°47′02″W

Fairhope Township, Somerset County, Pennsylvania
- Township
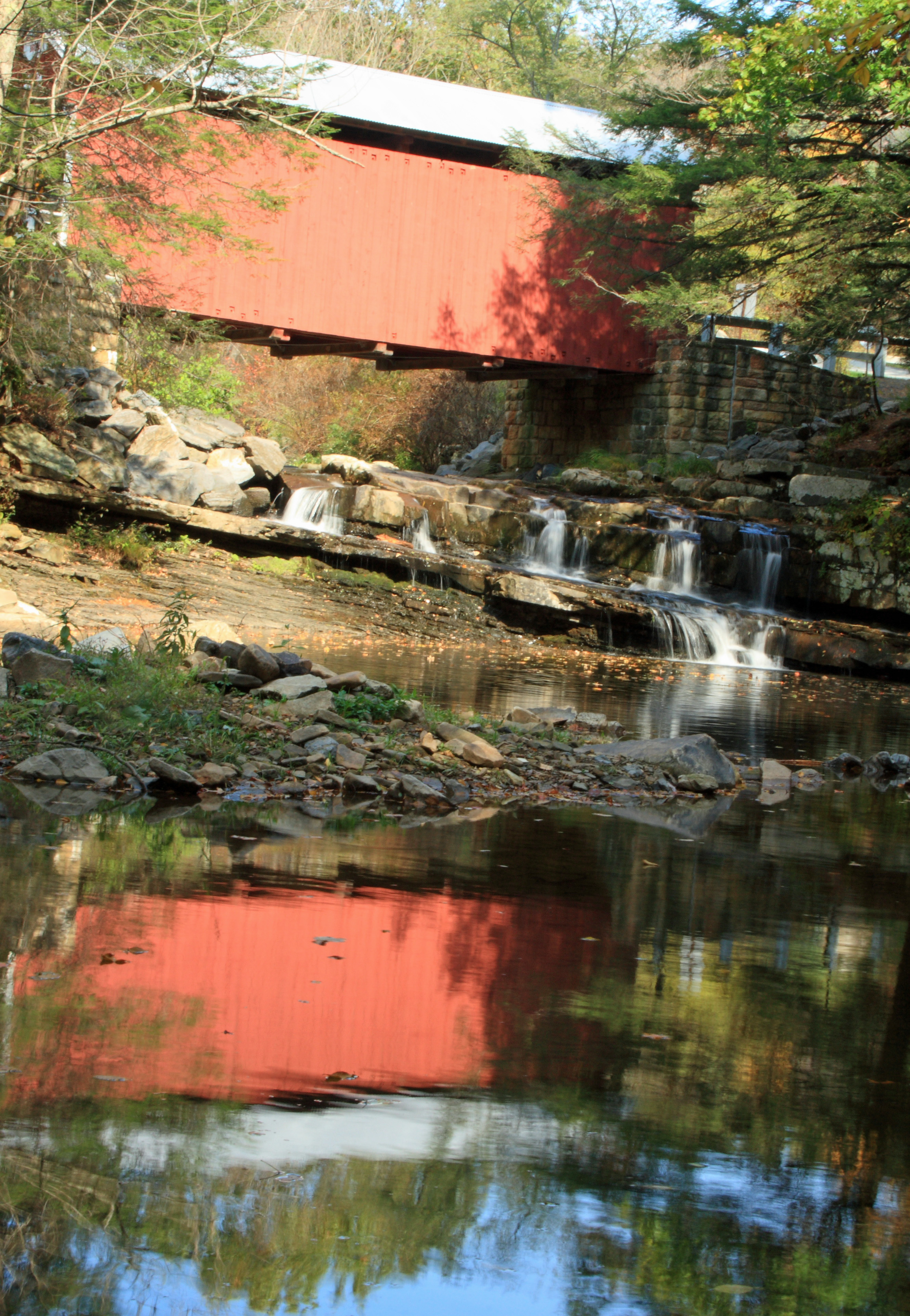
- Packsaddle Covered Bridge

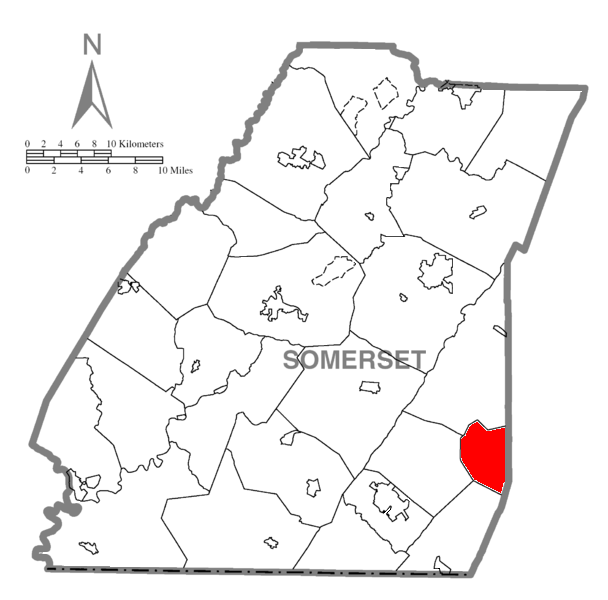
- Map of Somerset County, Pennsylvania Highlighting Fairhope Township

- Map of Somerset County, Pennsylvania
- Country: United States
- State: Pennsylvania
- County: Somerset

Area
  - Total: 14.60 sq mi (37.81 km^{2})
  - Land: 14.60 sq mi (37.81 km^{2})
  - Water: 0 sq mi (0.00 km^{2})

Population (2020)
  - Total: 102 ▼
  - Estimate (2021): 101
  - Density: 8.8/sq mi (3.41/km^{2})
- Time zone: UTC-5 (Eastern (EST))
  - Summer (DST): UTC-4 (EDT)
- FIPS code: 42-111-24680

Fairhope Township is a township in Somerset County, Pennsylvania, United States. The population was 102 at the 2020 census. It is part of the Johnstown, Pennsylvania, Metropolitan Statistical Area.

== History ==
The Packsaddle Bridge was added to the National Register of Historic Places in 1980.

== Geography ==
According to the United States Census Bureau, the township has a total area of 14.8 square miles (38 km^{2}), all land. Fairhope Township is bordered by Southampton Township to the south, Northampton Township to the west, Allegheny Township to the north, and Bedford County to the east. Wills Creek flows into Fairhope Township from Northampton Township. The unincorporated community of Fairhope is located within Fairhope Township, as are the communities of Foley and Williams Station. All three sit along Wills Creek and CSX Transportation's Keystone Subdivision railroad. Shaffers Run flows into Wills Creek just northwest (upstream) of Fairhope, and Brush Creek joins Wills Creek slightly west (upstream) of that.

== Recreation ==
A sizeable portion of the township is occupied by Pennsylvania State Game Lands Number 104.

== Demographics ==
Historical population
Census	Pop.	Note	%±
2010	134		—
2020	102		−23.9%
2021 (est.)	101		−1.0%
U.S. Decennial Census

At the 2000 census there were 137 people, 59 households, and 41 families living in the township. The population density was 9.3 people per square mile (3.6/km^{2}). There were 112 housing units at an average density of 7.6/sq mi (2.9/km^{2}). The racial makeup of the township was 100.00% White. Of the 59 households 25.4% had children under the age of 18 living with them, 61.0% were married couples living together, and 30.5% were non-families. 28.8% of households were one person and 10.2% were one person aged 65 or older. The average household size was 2.32 and the average family size was 2.85.

The age distribution was 19.7% under the age of 18, 8.0% from 18 to 24, 25.5% from 25 to 44, 26.3% from 45 to 64, and 20.4% 65 or older. The median age was 42 years. For every 100 females there were 124.6 males. For every 100 females age 18 and over, there were 120.0 males.

The median household income was $28,958 and the median family income was $29,688. Males had a median income of $31,667 versus $14,250 for females. The per capita income for the township was $13,087. There were 7.7% of families and 11.4% of the population living below the poverty line, including 14.7% of under eighteens and 16.0% of those over 64.

== Education ==
It is in the Berlin Brothersvalley School District.
