= Little Wills Creek =

River in Pennsylvania, United States

Coordinates: 39°49′22.3″N 78°42′49.4″W

Little Wills Creek is a 16.3-mile-long (26.2 km) tributary of Wills Creek in Bedford County, Pennsylvania, in the United States.

Little Wills Creek begins south of Pennsylvania Route 31. It flows down a valley between the Allegheny Front and Wills Mountain, drawing most of its water from the Allegheny Plateau, and enters Wills Creek just below Hyndman. Tributaries include Wolf Camp Run, Tar Water Creek, Mill Run, Grim Run, and Tiger Run.

== See also ==
- List of rivers of Pennsylvania
