= Indian Will =

Shawnee Indian

Indian Will was a Native American man who lived in a former settlement of the Shawnee Indians at the site of present-day Cumberland, Maryland, in the 18th century. The site was abandoned by the Shawnees prior to the first white settlers arriving in the region, but 'Indian Will' stayed behind living in a cabin on the mountain side. Will was a local legend in his time, and he is even credited with the original ownership of the present-day Wills Creek and Wills Mountain.

== Life ==
According to William Harrison Lowdermilk, Will was a full-blooded Indian, who with family and a few followers remained in the land of their forefathers; despite the approach of the white man, they did not remove their wigwams but received their strange visitors with a kindly greeting and lived in intimate friendship with them.

Will's home was in a small cove about three miles (5 km) from the mouth of the stream that bears his name. It was close to the rocky formation west of Cumberland known as the 'Devil's ladder'. It is also recorded that he had an Indian friend known as Eve.

Governor Thomas Bladen of Maryland persuaded Colonel Thomas Cresap to survey the land in that area named 'Will's Town'. Apparently, Will's claims to ownership of the land were respected. When the early explorers decided to build a cabin there, they never failed to give the Indian some trifle as a pretended compensation for the land.

As more cabins were built, the place customarily became known as 'Will's Creek' as early as 1728. However, on a map drawn in 1751, Will's Creek is marked as 'Caructucue Creek' and was known by no other name by the Indians. Over the years, the original name for this stream, which originates in Bedford County, has been lost. The creek and the mountain, which begin at Cumberland and end a few miles north west of Bedford, have been known as Wills Creek and Wills Mountain.

There seems to be some variation in the date of Will's death. Lowdermilk's History states that "the date of death is not definitely known, but that event is supposed to have occurred about the close of the Revolutionary War or shortly thereafter." In the Bedford County History, it is stated that sometime around 1758 a group of Indians made a raid in the section north east of Wills Creek in an area which is now known as Southampton Township in Bedford County. A number of settlers were massacred and a number of women and children taken prisoner. Apparently one member of this raiding party was Will. The Indians with their prisoners stopped for a short time at the southern tip of Wills Mountain to rest and to hold council.

A posse of neighbors and relatives took up the pursuit in the hope of rescuing the prisoners. When the Indians and prisoners were discovered, the posse did not attack, as they found that the Indians outnumbered them. Therefore, they played a waiting game to see what the Indians intended to do. When the Indians broke council, they started westward. One Indian did not go with them.

Several members of the posse followed the main party of Indians and their prisoners. George Powell, who was one of the posse, vowed he would avenge the death of his neighbor Mrs. Perrin and her baby. (Mrs. Perrin, history states, was a sister of Ray who had the first trading post at Bedford). Powell silently followed the footsteps of the Indian along the crest of the mountain. He finally located his quarry on the highest northern part of the mountain. The point was less than two miles (3 km) west of Fort Bedford. Powell shot and killed the Indian. He discovered that he had killed the man known as Will. He buried his body on the mountain at a place known as Will's Knob.

Will left several children to survive him. They are reported to have intermarried with white settlers and their descendants lived near the Pennsylvania State line on Wills Creek as late as 1810.

According to a story repeated many times to visitors in his antique shop on East Pitt Street by one of Bedford's late historians 'Judge' Davidson, several men came to Bedford, Maryland from Baltimore, Maryland sometime in the mid-19th century and with the help of a local person, they located Will's grave and excavated his skeleton. Its dimensions indicated this Indian was an unusually large man. Their excuse for taking the remains was to make a scientific study of the skeleton. If such a study was ever made, no report ever reached the people of Bedford.

Researching on the background of the Shawnee and Delaware tribes, it was found that an advance party of Shawnee came into Pennsylvania and settled along the Delaware River in 1692. They came here from Kentucky and Tennessee with permission from the province of Pennsylvania and the Iroquois confederacy. The Delaware were settled in this area especially in the eastern part long before the Shawnee came here.

A Pennsylvania map of Indian tribes for the period of about 1725 shows the Shawnee now located in the east, southeast and south central areas while the Delaware were also in the east, central and southwestern and western parts of the state. Therefore, Indian Will could have been born in either tribe. He could have also been a descendant of one of the tribes who lived in the Potomac Valley.
