= George Washington's Headquarters (Cumberland, Maryland) =

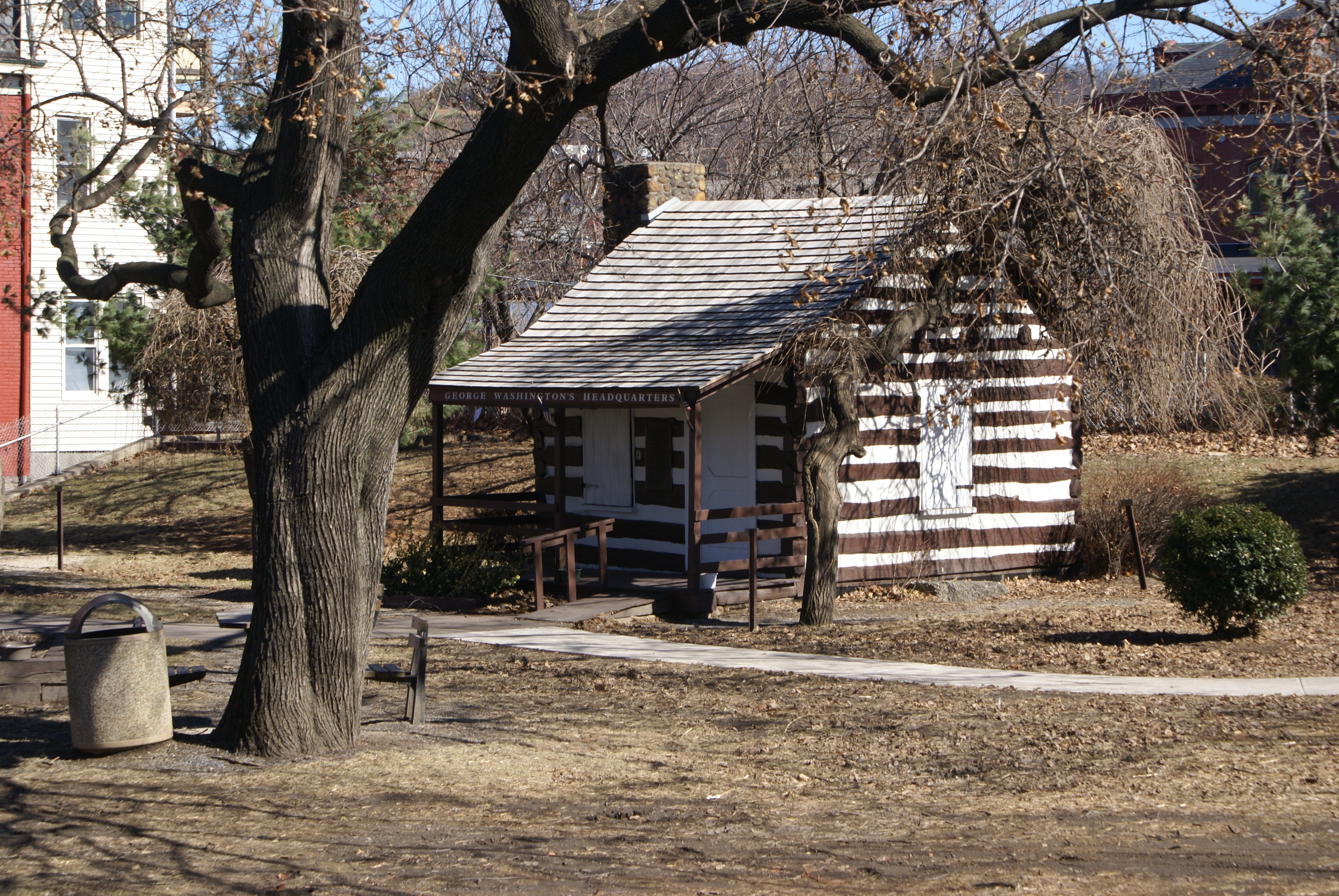
Headquarters of George Washington in its Riverside Park location

George Washington's Headquarters are a historic site located at 38 Greene Street in Cumberland, Maryland in central Allegany County (39° 38.975′ N, 78° 45.885′ W). The centerpiece and primary attraction at the site is a historic log cabin twice occupied by George Washington, the first President of the United States of America. The cabin resides in an area known today as Riverside Park, but was originally built about 2 blocks away, the original site is located nearby at 16 Washington Street.

== Historical significance ==
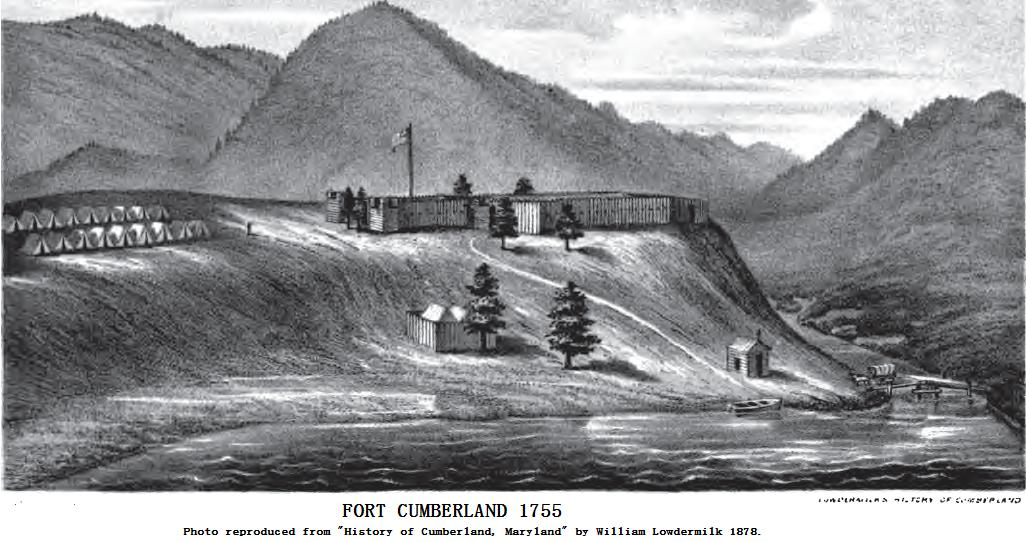
Fort Cumberland

The cabin was originally built by General Edward Braddock's men, between 1755 and 1758 for then Colonel George Washington's use during his service in the French and Indian War. He would later return and also used it briefly during 1794 then as the Commander in Chief, in order to review the troops gathered to put down the Whiskey Rebellion. This site is notable as it signifies Washington's first military command. The original site lies on a hill that overlooks Wills Creek and the Potomac River. It was once the location of Fort Cumberland (Maryland) and today, The Emmanuel Episcopal Church (Cumberland, Maryland). The headquarters was part of Fort Cumberland during the French and Indian War and it is the only building to survive from the original Fort.

== Restoration & Relocation ==
The structure’s exact original location within Fort Cumberland's perimeter has unfortunately been lost to history as it not included on surviving maps of the period. However the accounts of many of the area's late nineteenth century residents and an 1878 survey of historic Cumberland homes narrow the space to a single residential lot, the former home of one O.C. Gerhardt. That survey A History of Cumberland, and its author, Will H. Lowdermilk are also cite the earliest documented modification of the original cabin, noting that it was at one point expanded to a one and half story dwelling. The cabin remained in use to some degree, until 1844, when the land upon which it stood was purchased for residential development by one Judge Thomas Perry. According to A History of Cumberland, Judge Perry recognized and appreciated the buildings immense historical value and in an effort to preserve it, sold it to a close acquaintance; one George Blocher. Judge Perry and Mr. Blocher oversaw the cabin's careful dis-assembly and mile long voyage to a nearby farm on Bedford Road.

It was only after an undefined period of dormancy out on the Bedford Road farm that cabin and the Riverside Park complex we know today began to take shape. At some point the structure was purchased by local historian James Walter Thomas, reportedly with the intention of returning the cabin to its rightful, original place at the former site of Fort Cumberland. The cabin was subsequently entrusted to and restored by contractor William J. Morley. Morley was likely selected for having previously restored a similar structure at Valley Forge, in Eastern Pennsylvania. Valley Forge coincidentally also being the site of another historic trial for George Washington and the then fledgling United States.

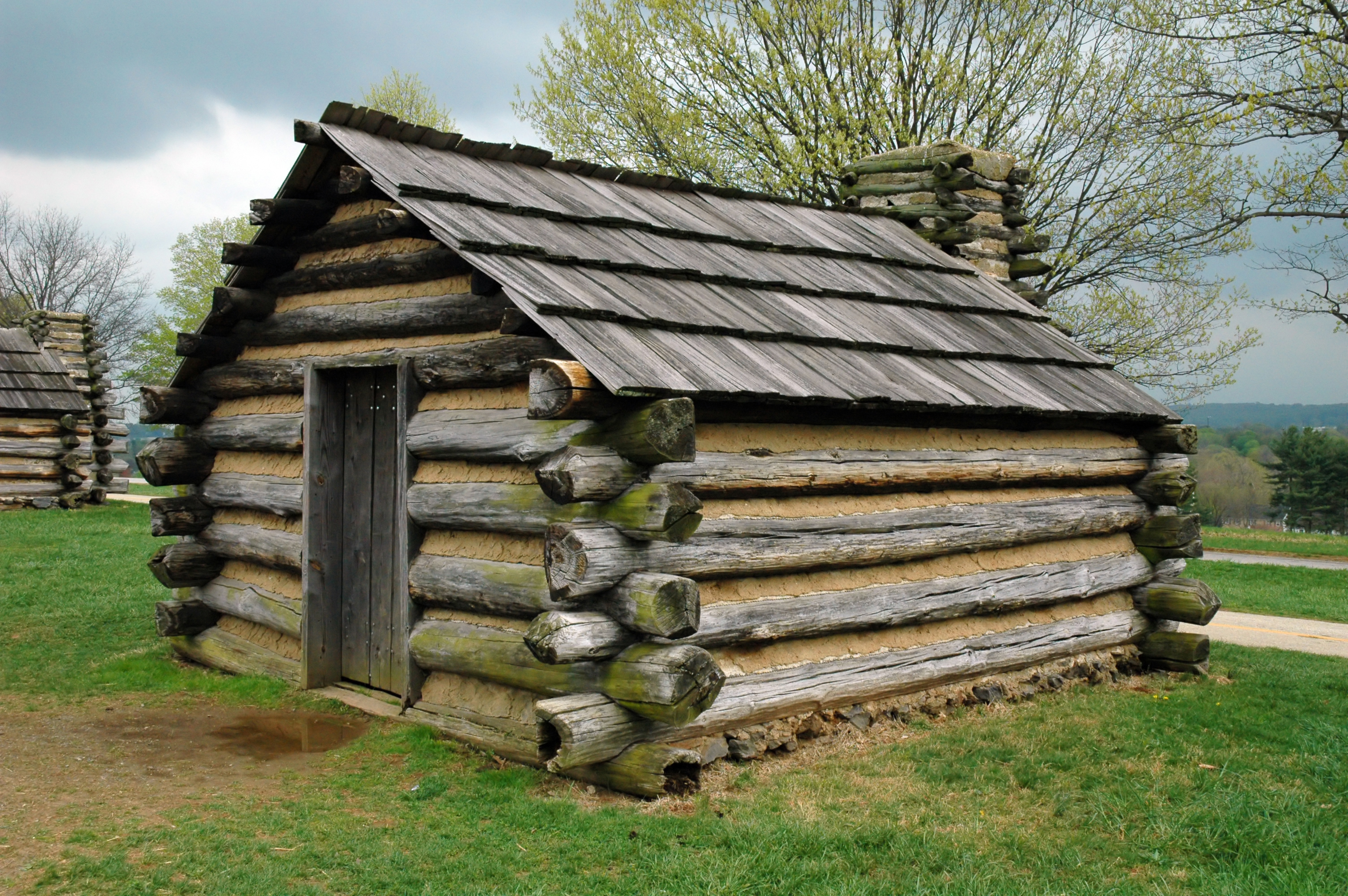
Valley Forge cabin

The April 1921 issue of the Cumberland Evening Times offers rare details concerning the actual restoration processes. According to that newspaper report; “The entire groundwork as it stood when occupied by Washington was intact and was used, as were the rafters, plates, and binders, and nothing new has been added, except the best tile roof obtainable.” The report did also note however, that in the case of a few logs too far decayed for use were substituted from the next oldest building in town (The Black Horse Tavern, on South Mechanic Street) were substituted. Local official were eager to facilitate the project by donating the land that would become Riverside Park in exchange for Thomas's counter donation of the cabin itself. The cabin was officially designated “George Washington’s Headquarters”, and the site as it exists today was born in 1921.

== Authenticity & Controversy ==
Shortly after the site's dedication, local Police and Fire Commissioner A.K. Hummelshime attacked the Cabins authenticity in a letter to then Cumberland Mayor Thomas Koon. Hummelshime attacked the project's legitimacy claiming that the logs used were gathered from disparate locations spanning a period of one hundred and fifty years, essentially claiming the cabin's connection to George Washington was fabricated. These allegations were addressed during a confrontation between Hummelshime and the Mayor at the March 14th 1921 City Council meeting in which Hummelshime was ultimately forced to concede that the charges in his letter were based on hearsay.

== Acknowledgments/Registries ==
Since its official public dedication the site has been under the stewardship of the local chapter of the Daughters of the American Revolution, who in addition to hosting occasional events, have outfitted the cabin with period correct furniture, clothes, weapons and assorted relics. Since 1975, the site has been listed in the Maryland Inventory of Historic Properties, but does not appear on the National Registry due to its having been moved in the past. The site is also featured as a prominent location along the Fort Cumberland Walking Trail.
