= Wills Creek (North Branch Potomac River tributary) =

River in Pennsylvania and Maryland, United States

Coordinates: 39°39′36″N 78°46′39″W

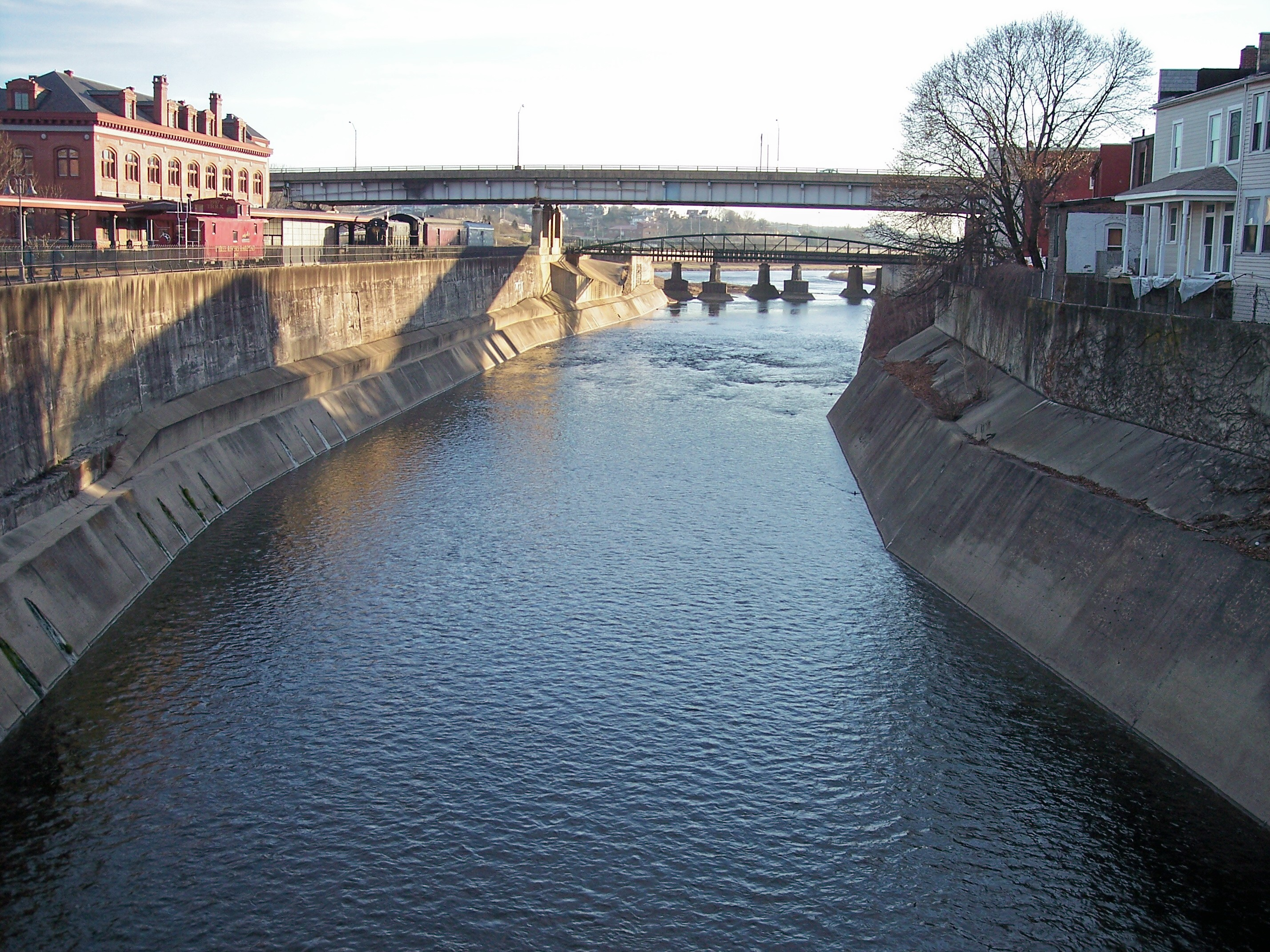
Wills Creek near its mouth in Cumberland in 2007

Wills Creek is a 38.6-mile-long (62.1 km) tributary of the North Branch Potomac River, located in the United States within the state borders of Pennsylvania and Maryland.

== Course ==
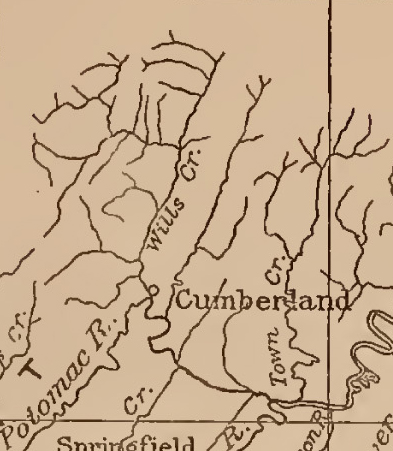
Wills Creek and Town Creek Watersheds in Pennsylvania and Maryland

Wills Creek drops off the Allegheny Mountains of southeastern Somerset County, Pennsylvania, beginning on the western slope of Savage Mountain in Larimer Township. It flows into Northampton Township, passing through Mance, Philson Station, and Glencoe. Wills Creek continues into Fairhope Township, passing through Foley, Fairhope, and Williams Station on its course eastward. Wills Creek enters Bedford County, Pennsylvania, in Londonderry Township, passing through Hyndman and making a sharp turn southward. It crosses from Pennsylvania into Maryland near Ellerslie in Allegany County, Maryland. It then runs past Corriganville and near Narrows Park before entering the North Branch Potomac River at Cumberland, Maryland.

== Tributaries ==
Tributaries along the initial section of Wills Creek include Laurel Run, Mountain Run, Brush Creek, Shaffers Run, and Gooseberry Run, all joining before Little Wills Creek flows into Wills Creek at Hyndman. As Wills Creek flows south, Thompson Run and Gladdens Run add their waters, Jennings Run joins at Corriganville, and Braddock Run flows into Wills Creek near Narrows Park.

- Brush Creek (Wills Creek)
- Little Wills Creek

== History ==
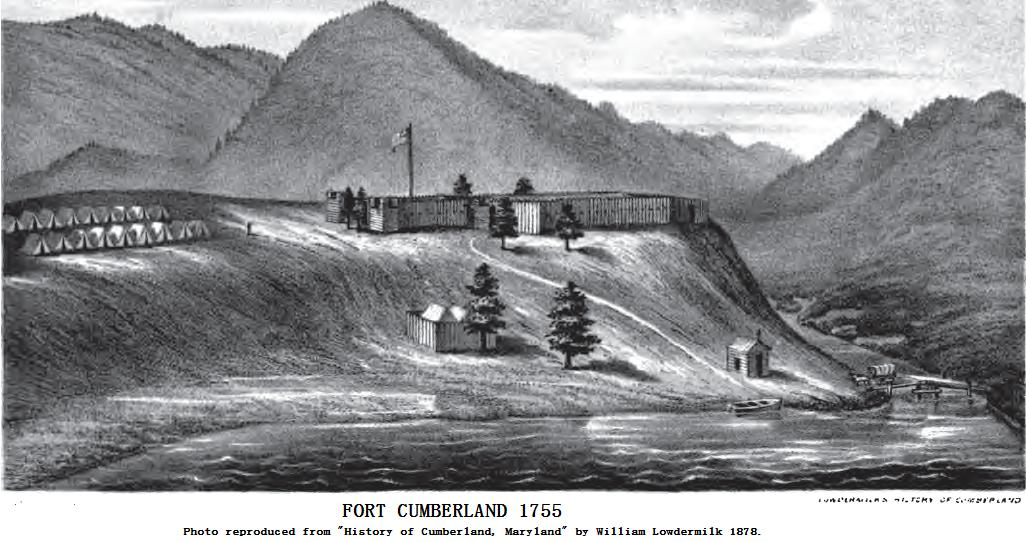
Fort Cumberland, 1755

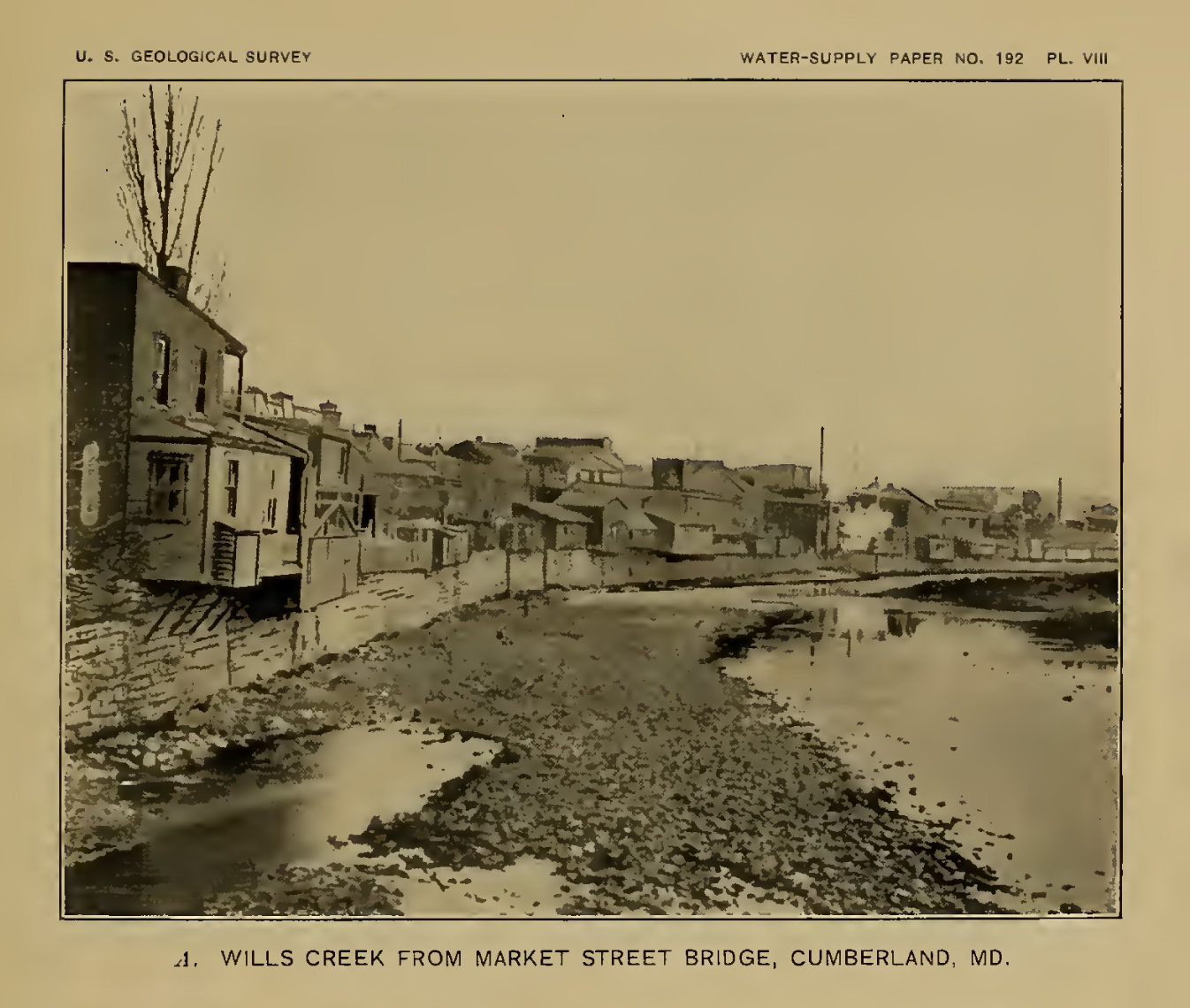
Overhanging Privies along Bank of Wills Creek (Market Street Bridge, Cumberland, Maryland, 1907)

Wills Creek was named after Will's Town, a former settlement of the Shawnee Indians at the site of Cumberland, Maryland. After the Shawnee deserted this region, an Indian named Will lived a short distance from the site of the old Shawnee town at the mouth of Caiuctucuc Creek. At the time of the coming of the first white settlers, he was living in a cabin on the mountain side. The creek, mountain, and town were afterward named for him. "Will's creek" is noted on the maps of Lewis Evans (1755) and Scull (1759, 1770), and on the map in Christopher Gist's journal. (See Hodge, 1912)

In the early twentieth century, pollution from industrial waste and household sewage was a problem, since many businesses and homes dumped their waste directly into Wills Creek in the urban area of Cumberland.

== Cumberland flood control system ==
In the 1950s, the city of Cumberland and the United States Army Corps of Engineers embarked upon an $18.5 million flood control program along a stretch of Wills Creek bordering the city. The project was one of the most costly public works projects in the city's history. Disastrous floods from Wills Creek had ravaged Cumberland, particularly in 1924, 1936, and 1942, and the Army Corps of Engineers designed a system that would prevent property damage caused by the high waters. It began just upstream from the bridge at U.S. Route 40, where the corps paved the bottom of Wills Creek, constructing concrete walls along its banks, and with the building of a sophisticated pumping system to prevent the watershed from flooding during heavy rain. The work took a decade to complete and was finished in 1959. It has successfully prevented flooding ever since.

== See also ==
- List of rivers of Maryland
- List of rivers of Pennsylvania
- Fort Cumberland (Maryland)
- Wills Creek Formation
