= Cumberland and Westernport Electric Railway =

American railroad of western Maryland

Cumberland & Westernport Electric Railway
Overview
- Headquarters: Cumberland, Maryland
- Locale: Cumberland, Frostburg, and Westernport, Maryland
- Dates of operation: 1896–1961

Technical
- Track gauge: 4 ft 8 1/2 in (1,435 mm) standard gauge
- Length: 8.6 miles (13.8 km)

The Cumberland and Westernport Electric Railway was a local and regional trolley system in Cumberland, Maryland from 1891-1961.

== Origin ==
Electric trolley service in Cumberland, Maryland, started on July 4, 1891, with the inauguration of the Cumberland Electric Railway. The railway initially transported passengers along North Centre Street to Narrows Park for a fare of five cents. The company later expanded it business by building a recreational complex on 15 acres (61,000 m^{2}) of land in an area formerly known as Seiss’ Picnic Grove, at the western end of the Cumberland Narrows near the present day Starlight Skating Rink. The Park included a soda fountain, dance and roller skating pavilion, and bandstand. In 1914, Kirkstetler Amusement leased the park to build an amusement park, that included a roller coaster, a merry-go-round, and a miniature railroad ride. In summer evenings the park was patronized by large crowds, and the trolley company expanded to meet the demand by adding extra, open sided cars to handle the traffic.

== Historical timeline ==
- 1891–1924 Cumberland Electric Railway
- 1924–1932 Potomac Edison Co. (American Water Works & Electric Co.)
- 1893–???? Lonaconing and Cumberland Electric Railway
- ????–???? Frostburg, Eckhart, and Cumberland Railway
- ????–???? Lonaconing, Midland and Frostburg Railway
- ????–???? Westernport and Lonaconing Railway Company
- 1906–1932 Cumberland and Westernport Electric Railway The C&WE trolley system consolidated the regional trolley lines of Lonaconing, Midland, Frostburg, and Westernport into one system with nearly 30 miles (48 km) of track, running from Cumberland to Frostburg and then down to the valley to Westernport linking together the largest far western population centers.
- 1932 – streetcars discontinued in Cumberland
