= Fairhope, Pennsylvania =

Unincorporated community in Pennsylvania, U.S.

Fairhope is an unincorporated community in Somerset County, Pennsylvania, United States.

== History ==
Fairhope is a small railroad community located along the historic B&O Railroad. It was platted in 1891.

In 1881, Pittsburgh entrepreneurs established the North Savage Firebrick Works of Welsh, Palmer & Maxwell just outside Fairhope. The company specializes in the manufacture of superior quality of red brick.

The B&O railroad line through Fairhope continues to operate; however, it has been absorbed in the CSX Transportation.

== Filmography ==
Fairhope was used as the village on the TV series The X-Files. The episode is called "Scary Monsters" and is the 14th episode of the ninth season. The program was not actually filmed on location.

== Geography ==
Fairhope is located at 39°50′23.748″N 78°47′29.292″W (39.8399, -78.7915)
