= Elections in Maryland =

Gubernatorial election results
Year	Democratic	Republican
1946	54.7% 268,084	45.3% 221,752
1950	42.7% 275,824	57.3% 369,807
1954	45.5% 319,033	54.5% 381,451
1958	63.6% 485,061	36.5% 278,173
1962	55.6% 428,071	44.4% 341,271
1966	40.6% 373,543	49.5% 455,318
1970	65.7% 639,579	32.3% 314,336
1974	63.5% 602,648	36.5% 346,449
1978	71.0% 718,328	29.0% 293,635
1982	62.0% 705,910	38.0% 432,826
1986	82.4% 907,291	17.6% 194,185
1990	59.8% 664,015	40.2% 446,980
1994	50.2% 708,094	49.8% 702,101
1998	55.1% 846,972	44.8% 688,357
2002	47.7% 813,422	51.6% 879,592
2006	52.7% 942,279	46.2% 825,464
2010	56.2% 1,044,961	41.8% 776,319
2014	47.3% 818,890	51.0% 884,400
2018	43.5% 1,002,639	55.4% 1,275,644
2022	64.5% 1,293,944	32.1% 644,000

United States presidential election results for Maryland
Year	Republican / Whig		Democratic		Third party(ies)	
Year	No.	%	No.	%	No.	%
1824	14,632	44.05%	14,523	43.73%	4,059	12.22%
1828	23,014	50.25%	22,782	49.75%	0	0.00%
1832	19,160	50.01%	19,156	49.99%	0	0.00%
1836	25,852	53.73%	22,267	46.27%	0	0.00%
1840	33,528	53.83%	28,752	46.17%	0	0.00%
1844	35,984	52.39%	32,706	47.61%	0	0.00%
1848	37,702	52.10%	34,528	47.72%	129	0.18%
1852	35,077	46.69%	40,022	53.28%	21	0.03%
1856	285	0.33%	39,123	45.04%	47,452	54.63%
1860	2,294	2.48%	5,966	6.45%	84,242	91.07%
1864	40,153	55.09%	32,739	44.91%	0	0.00%
1868	30,438	32.80%	62,357	67.20%	0	0.00%
1872	66,760	49.66%	67,687	50.34%	0	0.00%
1876	71,980	43.95%	91,779	56.05%	0	0.00%
1880	78,515	45.59%	93,706	54.41%	0	0.00%
1884	85,748	46.10%	96,866	52.07%	3,405	1.83%
1888	99,986	47.40%	106,188	50.34%	4,767	2.26%
1892	92,736	43.48%	113,866	53.39%	6,673	3.13%
1896	136,959	54.73%	104,150	41.62%	9,140	3.65%
1900	136,185	51.50%	122,238	46.23%	6,011	2.27%
1904	109,497	48.83%	109,446	48.81%	5,286	2.36%
1908	116,513	48.85%	115,908	48.59%	6,110	2.56%
1912	54,956	23.69%	112,674	48.57%	64,351	27.74%
1916	117,347	44.78%	138,359	52.80%	6,333	2.42%
1920	236,117	55.11%	180,626	42.16%	11,700	2.73%
1924	162,414	45.29%	148,072	41.29%	48,144	13.42%
1928	301,479	57.06%	223,626	42.33%	3,243	0.61%
1932	184,184	36.04%	314,314	61.50%	12,556	2.46%
1936	231,435	37.04%	389,612	62.35%	3,849	0.62%
1940	269,534	40.83%	384,546	58.25%	6,037	0.91%
1944	292,949	48.15%	315,490	51.85%	0	0.00%
1948	294,814	49.40%	286,521	48.01%	15,400	2.58%
1952	499,424	55.36%	395,337	43.83%	7,313	0.81%
1956	559,738	60.04%	372,613	39.96%	0	0.00%
1960	489,538	46.39%	565,808	53.61%	3	0.00%
1964	385,495	34.53%	730,912	65.47%	50	0.00%
1968	517,995	41.94%	538,310	43.59%	178,734	14.47%
1972	829,305	61.26%	505,781	37.36%	18,726	1.38%
1976	672,661	46.96%	759,612	53.04%	0	0.00%
1980	680,606	44.18%	726,161	47.14%	133,729	8.68%
1984	879,918	52.51%	787,935	47.02%	8,020	0.48%
1988	876,167	51.11%	826,304	48.20%	11,887	0.69%
1992	707,094	35.62%	988,571	49.80%	289,381	14.58%
1996	681,530	38.27%	966,207	54.25%	133,133	7.48%
2000	813,797	40.18%	1,145,782	56.57%	65,901	3.25%
2004	1,024,703	42.93%	1,334,493	55.91%	27,482	1.15%
2008	959,862	36.47%	1,629,467	61.92%	42,267	1.61%
2012	971,869	35.90%	1,677,844	61.97%	57,614	2.13%
2016	943,169	33.91%	1,677,928	60.33%	160,349	5.76%
2020	976,414	32.15%	1,985,023	65.36%	75,593	2.49%
2024	1,035,550	34.08%	1,902,577	62.62%	100,207	3.30%

The following is a list of federal, state, and local elections in the U.S. state of Maryland and can refer to one of the following elections:

- United States presidential elections in Maryland
- Primary elections in Maryland
- Maryland gubernatorial elections
- United States Senate election in Maryland
- United States House of Representatives elections in Maryland
- Maryland Comptroller election
- United States presidential election in Maryland
- Frederick mayoral election
- Baltimore mayoral election, among others

In a 2020 study, Maryland was ranked as the 5th-easiest state for citizens to vote in, based on registration and identification requirements, and convenience provisions.

== 1966 ==
- 1966 Maryland gubernatorial election

== 1969 ==
- 1969 Maryland special gubernatorial election

== 1982 ==
- 1982 United States House of Representatives elections in Maryland

== 1984 ==
- 1984 United States House of Representatives elections in Maryland

== 1986 ==
- 1986 United States House of Representatives elections in Maryland
- 1986 United States Senate election in Maryland

== 1988 ==
- 1988 United States House of Representatives elections in Maryland
- 1988 United States Senate election in Maryland

== 1992 ==
- 1992 United States presidential election in Maryland
- 1992 United States House of Representatives elections in Maryland
- 1992 United States Senate election in Maryland
- Question 6, statewide referendum to approve or reject a state law legalizing abortion up to fetal viability

== 1994 ==
- 1994 United States House of Representatives elections in Maryland
- 1994 United States Senate election in Maryland
- 1994 Maryland State Senate elections

== 1996 ==
- 1996 United States presidential election in Maryland
- 1996 United States House of Representatives elections in Maryland

== 1998 ==
- 1998 United States House of Representatives elections in Maryland
- 1998 United States Senate election in Maryland
- 1998 Maryland gubernatorial election

== 1999 ==
- 1999 Baltimore mayoral election

== 2000 ==
- 2000 United States presidential election in Maryland
- 2000 United States House of Representatives elections in Maryland
- 2000 United States Senate election in Maryland

== 2002 ==
- 2002 United States House of Representatives elections in Maryland
- 2002 Maryland gubernatorial election
- Question P, local referendum to reduce the size of the Baltimore City Council

== 2004 ==
- 2004 United States presidential election in Maryland
- 2004 United States House of Representatives elections in Maryland
- 2004 United States Senate election in Maryland

== 2006 ==
- 2006 Maryland gubernatorial election
- 2006 United States House of Representatives elections in Maryland
- 2006 Maryland Attorney General election
- 2006 Maryland Comptroller election

== 2007 ==
- 2007 Baltimore mayoral election

== 2008 ==
- 2008 United States presidential election in Maryland
- 2008 United States House of Representatives elections in Maryland
- 2008 Maryland's 4th congressional district special election
- Maryland Democratic primary, 2008
- Maryland Republican primary, 2008

== 2010 ==
- 2010 Maryland gubernatorial election
- 2010 United States House of Representatives elections in Maryland
- 2010 Maryland Attorney General election
- 2010 Maryland Comptroller election

== 2011 ==
- 2011 Baltimore mayoral election

== 2012 ==
- 2012 United States presidential election in Maryland
- 2012 United States House of Representatives elections in Maryland
- 2012 United States Senate election in Maryland
- Question 4, statewide referendum to allow undocumented immigrant students to pay in-state tuition rates at Maryland colleges and universities
- Question 6, statewide referendum to legalize same-sex marriage

== 2014 ==
- 2014 Maryland gubernatorial election
- 2014 United States House of Representatives elections in Maryland
- 2014 Maryland Attorney General election
- 2014 Maryland Comptroller election

== 2016 ==
- 2016 Maryland Democratic presidential primary
- 2016 Maryland Republican presidential primary
- 2016 United States presidential election in Maryland
- 2016 United States Senate election in Maryland
- 2016 United States House of Representatives elections in Maryland
- 2016 Baltimore mayoral election

== 2018 ==
- 2018 United States House of Representatives elections in Maryland
- 2018 United States Senate election in Maryland
- 2018 Maryland gubernatorial election
- 2018 Maryland Attorney General election
- 2018 Maryland Comptroller election

== 2020 ==
- 2020 United States presidential election in Maryland
- 2020 United States House of Representatives elections in Maryland
- 2020 Baltimore mayoral election

== 2022 ==
- 2022 United States House of Representatives elections in Maryland
- 2022 United States Senate election in Maryland
- 2022 Maryland gubernatorial election
- 2022 Maryland Attorney General election
- 2022 Maryland Comptroller election
- 2022 Maryland Question 4, statewide referendum to legalize cannabis for adult use

== 2024 ==
- 2024 United States presidential election in Maryland
- 2024 United States House of Representatives elections in Maryland
- 2024 United States Senate election in Maryland
- 2024 Baltimore mayoral election
- 2024 Maryland Question 1, statewide referendum to codify the right to reproductive liberty

== 2026 ==
- 2026 United States House of Representatives elections in Maryland
- 2026 Maryland gubernatorial election
- 2026 Maryland Attorney General election
- 2026 Maryland Comptroller election
- 2026 Maryland Question 3, statewide referendum to exempt Maryland's congressional districts from constitutional guidelines on redistricting

== See also ==
- Political party strength in Maryland
- United States presidential elections in Maryland
- Elections in the United States
- United States Electoral College
- Caucus
