= 1976 United States presidential election in Maryland =

- November 2, 1976

All 10 Maryland electoral votes to the Electoral College

| Nominee | Jimmy Carter | Gerald Ford |
| Party | Democratic | Republican |
| Home state | Georgia | Michigan |
| Running mate | Walter Mondale | Bob Dole |
| Electoral vote | 10 | 0 |
| Popular vote | 759,612 | 672,661 |
| Percentage | 53.04% | 46.96% |
County results
Carter
50–60%
60–70%
Ford
50–60%
60–70%
President before election
Gerald Ford
Republican
Elected President
Jimmy Carter
Democratic

The 1976 United States presidential election in Maryland was held on November 2, 1976 as part of the 1976 United States presidential election. Incumbent Republican President Gerald Ford of Michigan and his running mate Senator Bob Dole of Kansas lost to the Democratic challengers, Governor Jimmy Carter of Georgia and Senator Walter Mondale of Minnesota. Carter and Mondale won Maryland with 53.04% of the vote compared to Ford and Dole’s 46.96% – a comfortable margin of 6.08%.

After Nixon had won every county-equivalent in the state except for Baltimore City in 1972, Carter won ten of the state's 23 counties, most critically the populous Montgomery and Prince George's Counties in the Washington metropolitan area, and won Baltimore City by almost 100,000 raw votes. Carter began a Democratic winning streak in Prince George's County that continues to this day.

As of the 2024 presidential election, this is the last election in which a Democrat carried Allegany, Calvert, Cecil, and St. Mary’s Counties.

In this election, Maryland voted 4.01% more Democratic than the nation at-large.

== Results ==
1976 United States presidential election in Maryland
| Party | Candidate | Running mate | Votes | Percentage | Electoral votes |
|---|---|---|---|---|---|
| Democratic | Jimmy Carter | Walter Mondale | 759,612 | 53.04% | 10 |
| Republican | Gerald Ford (incumbent) | Bob Dole | 672,661 | 46.96% | 0 |

=== Results by county ===
| County | Jimmy Carter Democratic | | Gerald Ford Republican | | Margin | | Total votes cast |
| County | # | % | # | % | # | % | Total votes cast |
|---|---|---|---|---|---|---|---|
| Allegany | 15,967 | 50.85% | 15,435 | 49.15% | 532 | 1.70% | 31,402 |
| Anne Arundel | 54,351 | 46.97% | 61,353 | 53.03% | -7,002 | -6.06% | 115,704 |
| Baltimore | 118,505 | 45.27% | 143,293 | 54.73% | -24,788 | -9.46% | 261,798 |
| Baltimore City | 178,593 | 68.60% | 81,762 | 31.40% | 96,831 | 37.20% | 260,355 |
| Calvert | 4,626 | 57.36% | 3,439 | 42.64% | 1,187 | 14.72% | 8,065 |
| Caroline | 3,017 | 49.21% | 3,114 | 50.79% | -97 | -1.58% | 6,131 |
| Carroll | 9,940 | 38.83% | 15,661 | 61.17% | -5,721 | -22.34% | 25,601 |
| Cecil | 8,950 | 53.33% | 7,833 | 46.67% | 1,117 | 6.66% | 16,783 |
| Charles | 9,525 | 55.00% | 7,792 | 45.00% | 1,733 | 10.00% | 17,317 |
| Dorchester | 4,528 | 48.71% | 4,768 | 51.29% | -240 | -2.58% | 9,296 |
| Frederick | 14,542 | 44.77% | 17,941 | 55.23% | -3,399 | -10.46% | 32,483 |
| Garrett | 3,332 | 41.80% | 4,640 | 58.20% | -1,308 | -16.40% | 7,972 |
| Harford | 19,890 | 45.00% | 24,309 | 55.00% | -4,419 | -10.00% | 44,199 |
| Howard | 20,533 | 49.20% | 21,200 | 50.80% | -667 | -1.60% | 41,733 |
| Kent | 3,211 | 53.23% | 2,821 | 46.77% | 390 | 6.46% | 6,032 |
| Montgomery | 131,098 | 51.66% | 122,674 | 48.34% | 8,424 | 3.32% | 253,772 |
| Prince George's | 111,743 | 57.97% | 81,027 | 42.03% | 30,716 | 15.94% | 192,770 |
| Queen Anne's | 3,457 | 49.84% | 3,479 | 50.16% | -22 | -0.32% | 6,936 |
| Somerset | 3,472 | 51.62% | 3,254 | 48.38% | 218 | 3.24% | 6,726 |
| St. Mary's | 7,227 | 56.17% | 5,640 | 43.83% | 1,587 | 12.34% | 12,867 |
| Talbot | 3,715 | 38.85% | 5,848 | 61.15% | -2,133 | -22.30% | 9,563 |
| Washington | 15,902 | 44.05% | 20,194 | 55.95% | -4,292 | -11.90% | 36,096 |
| Wicomico | 9,412 | 47.18% | 10,537 | 52.82% | -1,125 | -5.64% | 19,949 |
| Worcester | 4,076 | 46.73% | 4,647 | 53.27% | -571 | -6.54% | 8,723 |
| Totals | 759,612 | 53.04% | 672,661 | 46.96% | 86,951 | 6.08% | 1,432,273 |

==== Counties that flipped from Republican to Democratic ====
- Allegany
- Calvert
- Cecil
- Charles
- Kent
- Montgomery
- Prince George's
- Somerset
- St. Mary's

=== Results by congressional district ===
Carter won 5 of the state's 8 congressional districts, including 2 that elected Republicans, while Ford won the remaining 3 districts, 2 of which elected Democrats.

| District | Carter | Ford | Representative |
|---|---|---|---|
| 1st | 49.3% | 50.7% | Robert Bauman |
| 2nd | 48.3% | 51.7% | Clarence Long |
| 3rd | 51.5% | 48.5% | Paul Sarbanes |
| 3rd | 51.5% | 48.5% | Barbara Mikulski |
| 4th | 50.1% | 49.9% | Marjorie Holt |
| 5th | 58.7% | 41.3% | Gladys Spellman |
| 6th | 45.2% | 54.8% | Goodloe Byron |
| 7th | 81.6% | 18.4% | Parren Mitchell |
| 8th | 51.7% | 48.3% | Gilbert Gude |
| 8th | 51.7% | 48.3% | Newton Steers |

== See also ==
- United States presidential elections in Maryland
- 1976 United States presidential election
- 1976 United States elections
