= Seal of Somerset County, Maryland =

The Great Seal of Somerset County
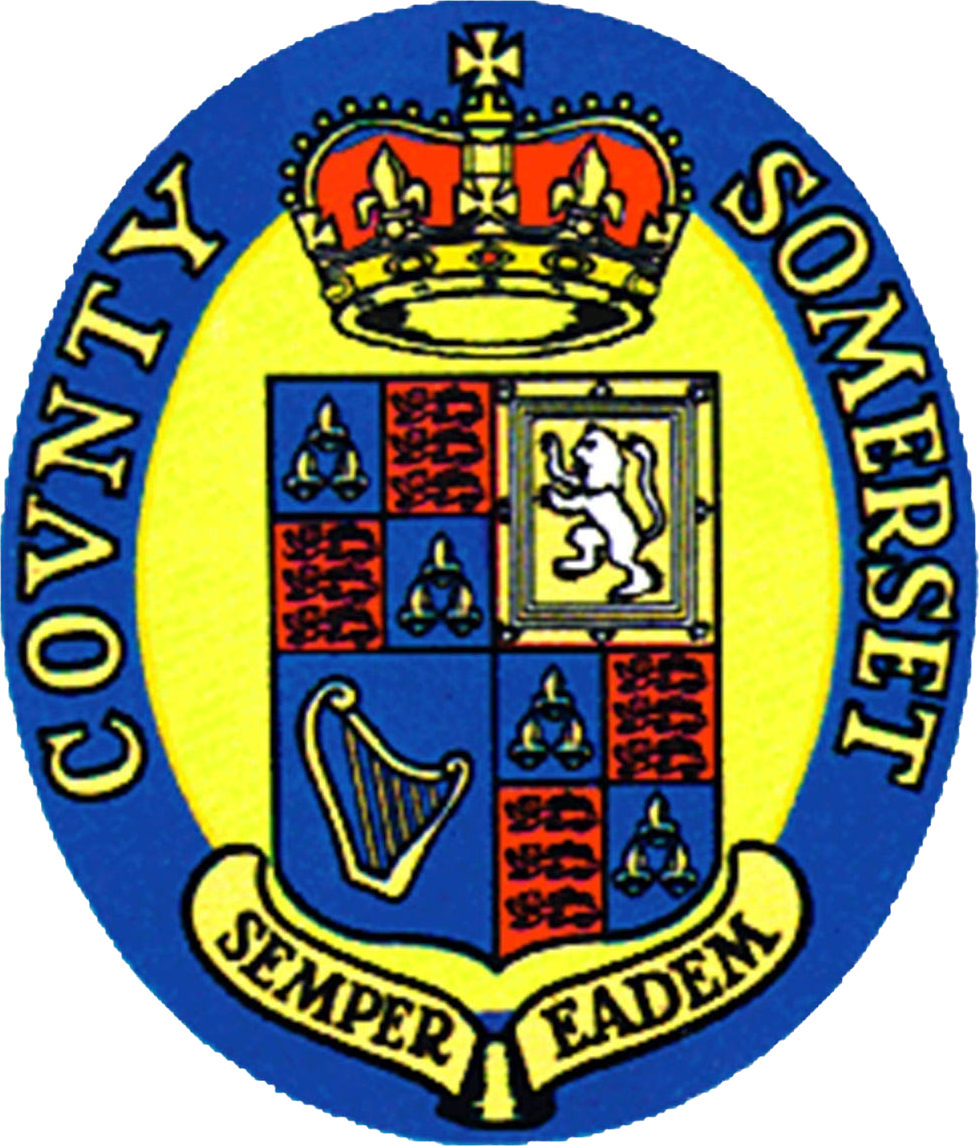
- Armiger: Somerset County
- Adopted: 1958
- Motto: SEMPER EADEM

The Great Seal of Somerset County, Maryland, is the official county seal of Somerset County, Maryland, United States. The seal was created in 1666 but fell out of use in 1707 before being restored in 1958.

== History ==
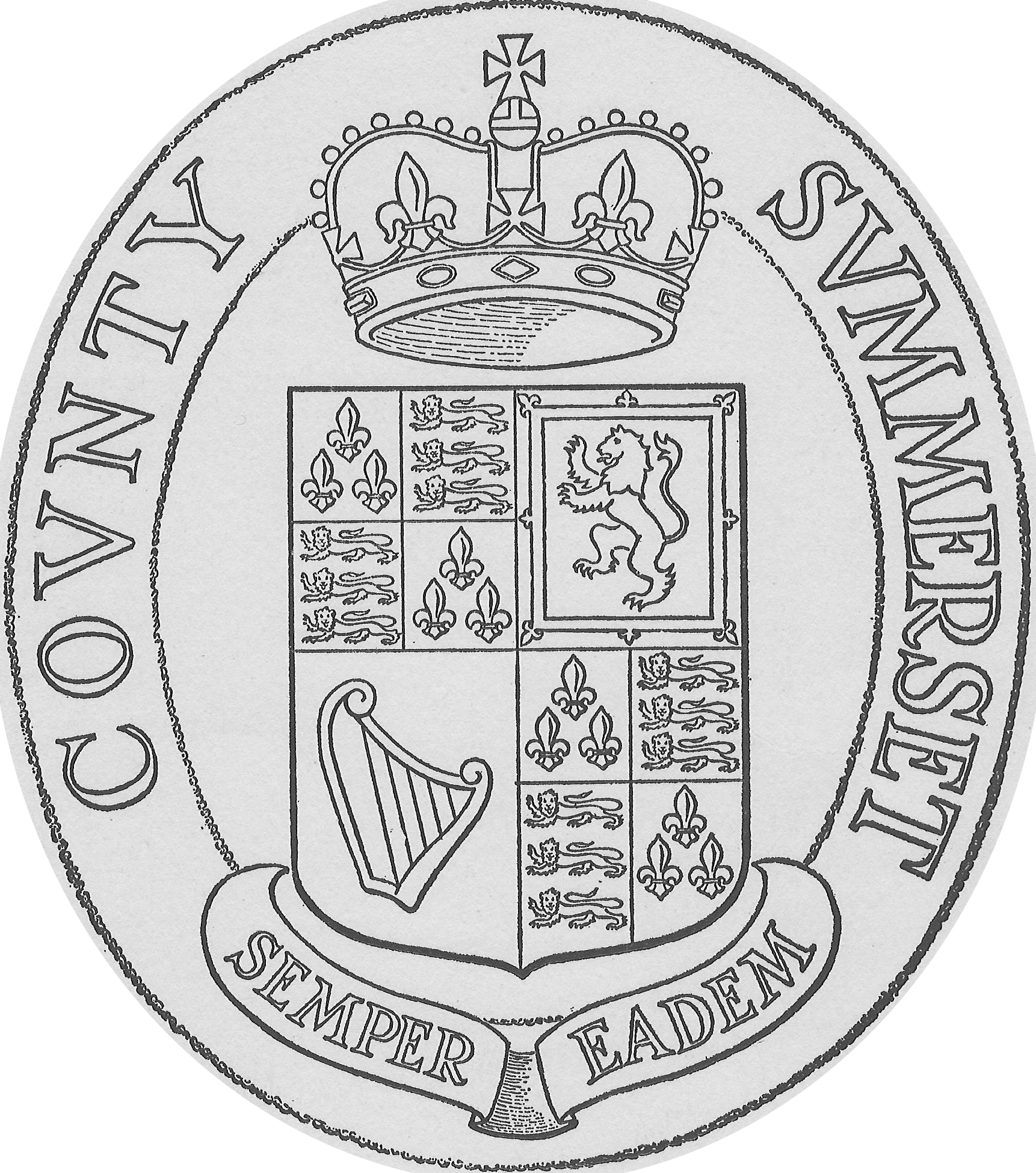
The 1958 seal, in monochrome with old-style spelling.

Somerset County was founded in the Province of Maryland in 1666 and was named after Mary Somerset, the sister-in-law of Cecil Calvert, 2nd Baron Baltimore. At the time of its founding, the Great Seal was created. The Seal was in use by Somerset County between 1666 and 1707 before falling out of use. The seal was not reused until 1958 when it was restored and started to be used again in black and white form. This monochrome version of the seal was used until researchers at The Old Princess Anne Days Committee and the Somerset Board of County Commissioners looked into the original coloring of it and restored the Great Seal in color.

== Design ==
The seal features the coat of arms used by King Charles II and the House of Stuart at the time of the county's founding, as sovereign of England, Scotland and Ireland. It features a St. Edward's Crown on the top. The three yellow lions and fleurs-de-lys on the top left and bottom right quarters represent England and the English claims to the French throne (in reverse order, as used by the English kings). The white lion on the top right represents Scotland and the harp on the bottom left represents Ireland. Surrounding it is a garter with "Covnty Somerset" using the archaic English spelling on it. Below the seal is a scroll with the words "Semper Eadem" (Latin: Always the same) written on it, which is also the motto of nearby Prince George's County. Some versions of the seal add "1666" beneath it to reflect the foundation year of Somerset County.
