= 1956 United States presidential election in Maryland =

- November 6, 1956

All 9 Maryland votes to the Electoral College

Nominee	Dwight D. Eisenhower	Adlai Stevenson
Party	Republican	Democratic
Home state	Pennsylvania (Note: Although he was born in Texas and grew up in Kansas before his military career, at the time of the 1952 election Eisenhower was president of Columbia University and was, officially, a resident of New York. During his first term as president, he moved his private residence to Gettysburg, Pennsylvania, and officially changed his residency to Pennsylvania.)	Illinois
Running mate	Richard Nixon	Estes Kefauver
Electoral vote	9	0
Popular vote	559,738	372,613
Percentage	60.04%	39.96%
County results
Eisenhower
50–60%
60–70%
70–80%
President before election
Dwight D. Eisenhower
Republican
Elected President
Dwight D. Eisenhower
Republican

The 1956 United States presidential election in Maryland took place on November 6, 1956, as part of the 1956 United States presidential election. State voters chose nine representatives, or electors, to the Electoral College, who voted for president and vice president.

Maryland was won by incumbent President Dwight D. Eisenhower (R–Pennsylvania), running with Vice President Richard Nixon, with 60.04% of the popular vote, against Adlai Stevenson (D–Illinois), running with Senator Estes Kefauver, with 39.96% of the popular vote.

By winning all 24 county-equivalents, Eisenhower became and remains the solitary presidential candidate to sweep all Maryland's counties and Baltimore City in a contested election. As of the 2024 election, this is the last election in which the City of Baltimore voted for a Republican presidential candidate, and by extension, the last election in which a presidential candidate won all of the state's counties. Eisenhower is also the last Republican to carry the state twice.

George Washington in 1792 is the only other candidate who swept all of Maryland's existing counties, though at the time several did not yet exist. In 1789 and 1820, the other two elections in which a candidate ran virtually unopposed, unpledged slates of electors ran as opposition in both elections: Anti-Federalist electors in 1789, and Federalist electors in 1820. These electors supported Washington and James Monroe, but supported different vice presidential candidates. Thus, it is a debatable topic whether these count as total sweeps or not (In 1789, the Anti-Federalist electors won Baltimore and Anne Arundel county, and in 1820 St. Mary's and Charles counties). Nevertheless, Eisenhower remains the only candidate in the modern party system to win all of Maryland's counties, and the only to win all of the presently existing ones.

In this election, Maryland voted 4.67% to the right of the nation at-large.

This was the last time Maryland voted for a Republican presidential candidate until Eisenhower's vice president, Richard Nixon, won the state in his re-election bid in 1972.

== Results ==
1956 United States presidential election in Maryland
Party	Candidate	Votes	%
Republican	Dwight D. Eisenhower (inc.)	559,738	60.04%
Democratic	Adlai Stevenson	372,613	39.96%
Total votes		932,351	100%

=== Results by county ===
County	Dwight D. Eisenhower Republican		Adlai Stevenson Democratic		Margin		Total votes cast
County	#	%	#	%	#	%	Total votes cast
Allegany	20,239	65.26%	10,775	34.74%	9,464	30.52%	31,014
Anne Arundel	28,622	64.30%	15,888	35.70%	12,734	28.60%	44,510
Baltimore	104,021	68.30%	48,270	31.70%	55,751	36.60%	152,291
Baltimore City	178,244	55.90%	140,603	44.10%	37,641	11.80%	318,847
Calvert	2,764	58.44%	1,966	41.56%	798	16.88%	4,730
Caroline	4,208	60.90%	2,702	39.10%	1,506	21.80%	6,910
Carroll	11,749	72.65%	4,423	27.35%	7,326	45.30%	16,172
Cecil	7,217	59.38%	4,936	40.62%	2,281	18.76%	12,153
Charles	5,088	56.41%	3,931	43.59%	1,157	12.82%	9,019
Dorchester	5,809	60.88%	3,733	39.12%	2,076	21.76%	9,542
Frederick	14,387	65.38%	7,619	34.62%	6,768	30.76%	22,006
Garrett	5,555	73.09%	2,045	26.91%	3,510	46.18%	7,600
Harford	12,657	65.77%	6,588	34.23%	6,069	31.54%	19,245
Howard	6,534	64.48%	3,599	35.52%	2,935	28.96%	10,133
Kent	3,747	61.18%	2,378	38.82%	1,369	22.36%	6,125
Montgomery	56,501	57.01%	42,606	42.99%	13,895	14.02%	99,107
Prince George's	40,654	50.86%	39,280	49.14%	1,374	1.72%	79,934
Queen Anne's	3,321	55.70%	2,641	44.30%	680	11.40%	5,962
Somerset	4,770	61.15%	3,031	38.85%	1,739	22.30%	7,801
St. Mary's	4,336	55.74%	3,443	44.26%	893	11.48%	7,779
Talbot	6,018	68.75%	2,735	31.25%	3,283	37.50%	8,753
Washington	19,455	62.72%	11,562	37.28%	7,893	25.44%	31,017
Wicomico	9,377	63.94%	5,289	36.06%	4,088	27.88%	14,666
Worcester	4,465	63.47%	2,570	36.53%	1,895	26.94%	7,035
Totals	559,738	60.04%	372,613	39.96%	187,125	20.08%	932,351

==== Counties that flipped from Democratic to Republican ====
- Baltimore (City)

== See also ==
- United States presidential elections in Maryland
- 1956 United States presidential election
- 1956 United States elections
