= 1972 United States presidential election in Maryland =

- November 7, 1972

All 10 Maryland electoral votes to the Electoral College

Nominee	Richard Nixon	George McGovern
Party	Republican	Democratic
Home state	California	South Dakota
Running mate	Spiro Agnew	Sargent Shriver
Electoral vote	10	0
Popular vote	829,305	505,781
Percentage	61.26%	37.36%
County results
Nixon
50–60%
60–70%
70–80%
McGovern
50–60%

The 1972 United States presidential election in Maryland was held on November 7, 1972, as part of the 1972 United States presidential election. Both the Democratic and Republican (Sargent Shriver and Spiro Agnew, respectively) Vice Presidential nominees were from Maryland.

Maryland was won by incumbent President Richard Nixon of California and Vice President Spiro Agnew (a Maryland native), winning 61.26% of the vote to George McGovern and Shriver's 37.36%. Nixon won every county in the state, only losing independent Baltimore City. He won over 77% of the vote in Carroll County, and over 70% in another eight counties. As of the 2024 presidential election, this is the last time Prince George's County has voted Republican in a presidential election, the strongest performance by a Republican in Maryland, and the last time the Democratic candidate was held to under 60% of the vote in Baltimore City. This was also the last of only 7 occasions (Note: The other six are 1864, 1896 under William Jennings Bryan's "cross of gold" opposed by Northeastern industrialists, and the four elections from 1944 to 1956) since the emergence of the Republican Party that Maryland has voted more Republican than the nation as a whole.

A voting machine in the town of Saint Michaels malfunctioned on election day, causing only 14 of the 435 ballots cast on it to be properly recorded. Circuit Judge Harry Clark barred the Talbot County Board of Election Supervisors from certifying the county's results until a revote was held at the affected polling location, which occurred on November 15.

Of his three presidential campaigns, this was the only time Nixon carried the home state of his running mate. Nixon had lost Maryland in 1968 and had also failed to win Henry Cabot Lodge Jr.'s home state of Massachusetts in 1960.

== Results ==
1972 United States presidential election in Maryland
Party	Candidate	Running mate	Votes	Percentage	Electoral votes
Republican	Richard Nixon (incumbent)	Spiro Agnew (incumbent)	829,305	61.26%	10
Democratic	George McGovern	Sargent Shriver	505,781	37.36%	0
American Independent	John G. Schmitz	Thomas J. Anderson	18,726	1.38%	0

=== Results by county ===
County	Richard Nixon Republican		George McGovern Democratic		John G. Schmitz American Independent		Margin		Total votes cast
County	#	%	#	%	#	%	#	%	Total votes cast
Allegany	20,687	64.55%	10,808	33.72%	553	1.73%	9,879	30.83%	32,048
Anne Arundel	71,707	72.26%	26,082	26.28%	1,450	1.46%	45,625	45.98%	99,239
Baltimore	175,897	70.30%	70,309	28.10%	4,018	1.61%	105,588	42.20%	250,224
Baltimore City	119,486	45.15%	141,323	53.40%	3,843	1.45%	-21,837	-8.25%	264,652
Calvert	4,024	63.43%	2,232	35.18%	88	1.39%	1,792	28.25%	6,344
Caroline	4,325	72.71%	1,567	26.34%	56	0.94%	2,758	46.37%	5,948
Carroll	16,847	77.25%	4,408	20.21%	553	2.54%	12,439	57.04%	21,808
Cecil	10,759	70.82%	4,113	27.08%	319	2.10%	6,646	43.74%	15,191
Charles	9,665	67.34%	4,502	31.37%	186	1.30%	5,163	35.97%	14,353
Dorchester	6,859	74.97%	2,136	23.35%	154	1.68%	4,723	51.62%	9,149
Frederick	19,907	69.48%	8,235	28.74%	509	1.78%	11,672	40.74%	28,651
Garrett	5,480	76.60%	1,510	21.11%	164	2.29%	3,970	55.49%	7,154
Harford	25,141	73.16%	8,737	25.42%	488	1.42%	16,404	47.74%	34,366
Howard	19,265	63.55%	10,668	35.19%	383	1.26%	8,597	28.36%	30,316
Kent	4,036	64.36%	2,168	34.57%	67	1.07%	1,868	29.79%	6,271
Montgomery	133,090	56.50%	100,228	42.55%	2,239	0.95%	32,862	13.95%	235,557
Prince George's	116,166	58.55%	79,914	40.28%	2,330	1.17%	36,252	18.27%	198,410
Queen Anne's	4,380	70.45%	1,712	27.54%	125	2.01%	2,668	42.91%	6,217
Somerset	4,342	67.33%	2,036	31.57%	71	1.10%	2,306	35.76%	6,449
St. Mary's	7,689	67.55%	3,571	31.37%	122	1.07%	4,118	36.18%	11,382
Talbot	6,620	74.73%	2,181	24.62%	58	0.65%	4,439	50.11%	8,859
Washington	24,234	69.27%	10,039	28.70%	712	2.04%	14,195	40.57%	34,985
Wicomico	13,115	69.71%	5,510	29.29%	190	1.01%	7,605	40.42%	18,815
Worcester	5,584	75.22%	1,792	24.14%	48	0.65%	3,792	51.08%	7,424
Totals	829,305	61.26%	505,781	37.36%	18,726	1.38%	323,524	23.90%	1,353,812

== See also ==
- United States presidential elections in Maryland
- 1972 United States presidential election
- 1972 United States elections
