= Somerset County, Maryland =

County in Maryland, United States

- County
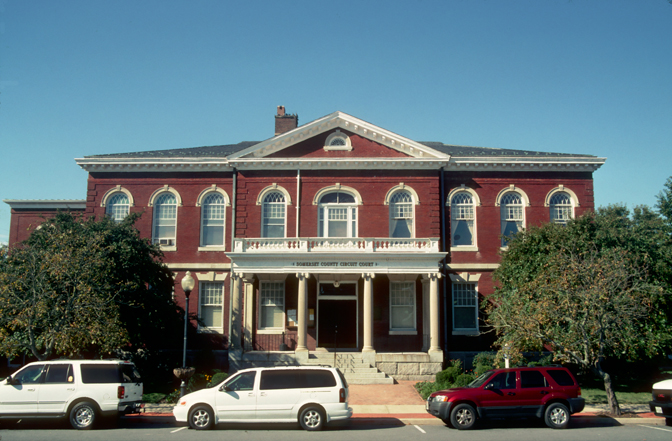
- Somerset County Courthouse

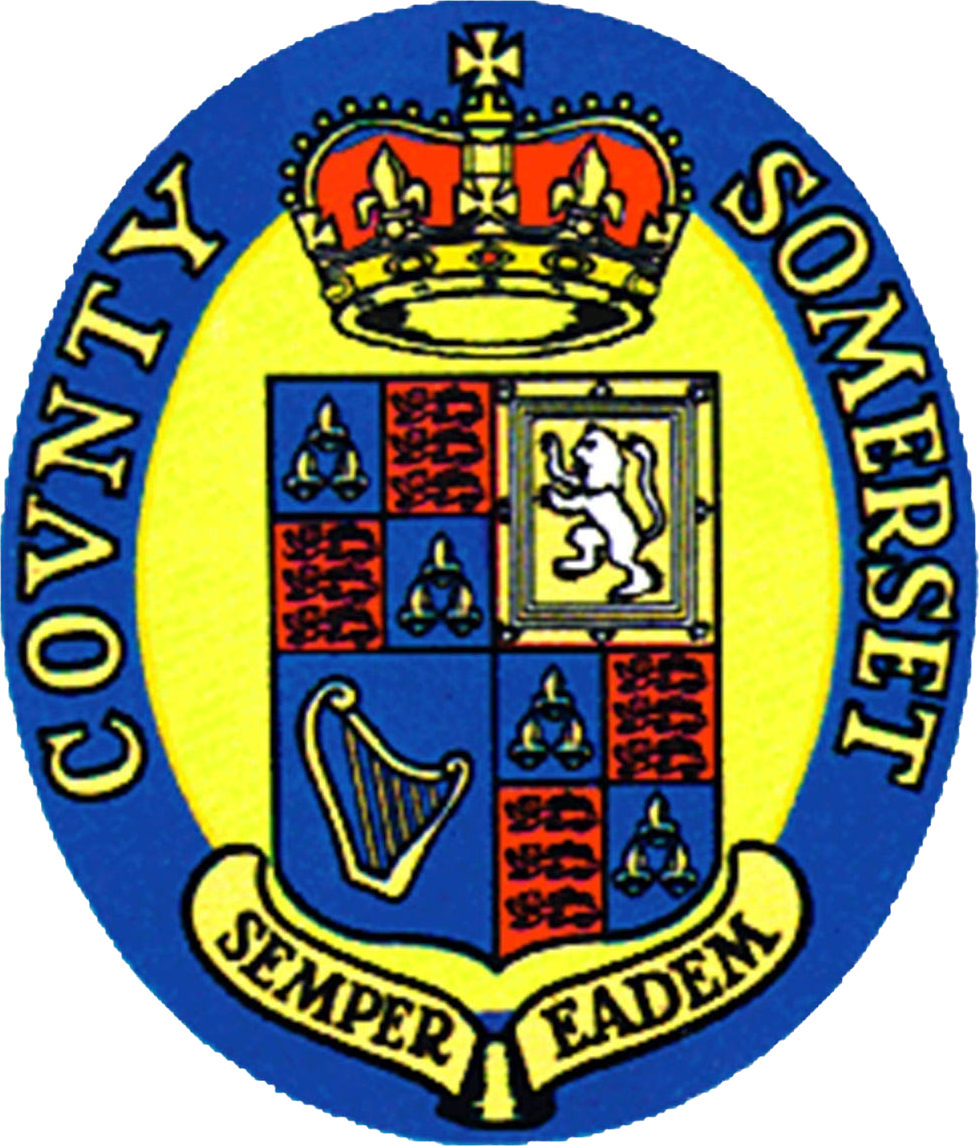
- Flag Seal
- Motto: "Semper Eadem" (English: "Ever the Same")
- Location within the U.S. state of Maryland
- Coordinates: 38°05′N 75°52′W
- Country: United States
- State: Maryland
- Founded: August 22, 1666
- Named for: Mary, Lady Somerset
- Seat: Princess Anne
- Largest town: Princess Anne

Area
  - Total: 610.35 sq mi (1,580.8 km^{2})
  - Land: 319.75 sq mi (828.1 km^{2})
  - Water: 290.60 sq mi (752.7 km^{2})

Population (2020)
  - Total: 24,620
  - Estimate (2025): 24,973 ▲
  - Density: 77.00/sq mi (29.73/km^{2})
- Time zone: UTC−5 (Eastern)
  - Summer (DST): UTC−4 (EDT)
- Congressional district: 1st
- Website: www.somersetmd.us

Somerset County is the southernmost county in the U.S. state of Maryland. As of the 2020 United States census, the population was 24,620, making it the second-least populous county in Maryland. The county seat is Princess Anne. The county is part of the Lower Eastern Shore region of the state.

The county was named for Mary, Lady Somerset, the wife of Sir John Somerset and daughter of Thomas Arundell, 1st Baron Arundell of Wardour (c. 1560–1639). She was also the sister of Anne Calvert, Baroness Baltimore (1615–1649), who later lent her name to Anne Arundel County, which was erected in 1650 as the Province of Maryland's third county.

Somerset County is located on the state's Eastern Shore. It is included in the Salisbury, MD-DE Metropolitan Statistical Area.

The University of Maryland Eastern Shore is located in Princess Anne.

== History ==
=== Initial settlements ===
Somerset County was settled and established by English colonists in part due to a response to the Province/Dominion of Virginia passing a law in 1659/1660 requiring Quakers in the colony to convert to Anglicanism or leave the colony. A group of Virginia Quakers living in Accomack County, Virginia, on the southern tip of what later became known as the Delmarva Peninsula, petitioned Charles Calvert, third Lord Baltimore in 1661 to migrate to the Eastern Shore of Maryland to the territory under his governance. The governor considered this an opportunity to fortify the borders of his territory on the Delmarva Peninsula against the pressing encroachment of the Virginians.

The Royal Charter that Lord Baltimore had received from King Charles I in 1632 had granted Maryland the land north of the entire length of the Potomac River up to the 40th parallel. Later surveys authorized by Baltimore on the Eastern Shore of the Chesapeake Bay indicated that the southern boundary would continue across the peninsula at the mouth of the Pocomoke River. It was marked on the north shore by a rock outcropping labelled as "Watkins' Point". The Virginian Quakers settled just north of that point, on the southern bank of the Annemessex River in November 1662, A separate group of Anglican Virginian settlers were granted permission to make another settlement, further north along the Manokin River.

In conjunction with the two new settlements, Lord Baltimore set up a three-man commission for the Eastern Shore territory, made up of two Marylanders and one Virginian. Its purpose was ostensibly to oversee the territory, found new settlements, and maintain a detailed recording of all land and civic transactions in the area. Lord Baltimore intended to use the commission to reinforce Maryland's claim to the area and to monitor any encroachments by Virginians.

=== Invasion from Virginia ===
In 1663, activists from Virginia persuaded the Virginia Assembly to declare that the Virginia-Maryland border was 30 miles (48 km) north of the Pocomoke Sound, at the mouth of the Wicomico River. The Assembly tried to secure the allegiance to Virginia of all settlers south of the Wicomico River – including the Annemessex and Manokin settlements. In early October 1663, a militia from Accomac County, Virginia led by a Colonel Edmund Scarborough arrived at the Annemessex settlement. They attempted to secure oaths of allegiance under threat of arrest and property confiscation. Scarborough was also on a personal mission to arrest Stephen Horsey (born on Isle of Wight, England and immigrated to Northampton, Virginia, 1643), the leader of the anti-tax movement and a vocal critic of the colonial government. He along with fellow Northampton County residents William Coulborne, Randall Revell, and Ambrose Dixon signed the Tricesimo die Marty 1651.

Scarborough and his force of 40 mounted men reached Horsey's new residence on October 11, 1663, and presented the Commands of the Assembly of Virginia against him. Horsey was "arrested" by Scarborough, but Horsey refused to accompany the party back to Virginia, declaring that he was going to remain in Maryland and maintain allegiance to the King and Lord Baltimore. The settlers expelled Scarborough and his force from the settlement. The company moved on to the Manokin Settlement, where they were received much more favorably. Although the Anglican settlers there were willing to swear allegiance to the Virginia colonial government, they were not willing to take any action against Lord Baltimore's government. Scarborough returned to Virginia without success in taking over southern Somerset County for Virginia.

=== Early county leaders ===
The new settlers established a government for Somerset County, the eighth in the Province of Maryland; it was formed from the southern part of Kent County. This had been organized in 1642 as the Province's second county, encompassing the entire Eastern Shore of the Chesapeake. Horsey was selected to sit on the first county court, which administered the new county. Charles Calvert appointed Stephen Horsey on December 11, 1665, along with Captain William Thorne, William Stevens, George Johnson, John Winder, James Jones and Henry Boston. Horsey sat as a regular member of the Somerset County Court through the winter and spring of 1666. He traveled across the Chesapeake Bay in 1665 with Captain Thorne to meet with Charles Calvert, who swore them in as county commissioners. Horsey established himself as a nonconformist and someone willing to stand up for his beliefs.

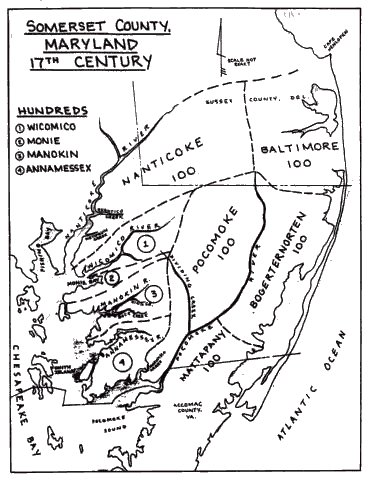
Map of The Hundreds of Somerset County, Maryland as of 1669. Note the boundaries overlap with Sussex, Delaware and Accomac counties, Virginia.

=== Boundary disputes with Delaware ===
County boundary disputes continued, including of the northern boundary. Baltimore believed his Eastern Shore territory extended to the top of the peninsula, where the Delaware River meets the Bay. In the 1680s, William Penn, founder of Pennsylvania, claimed this territory as his own, based on a conflicting deed. Penn, Baltimore, and their heirs began a protracted legal battle to determine the boundaries. Their compromise was to split the Delmarva Peninsula; however, they disagreed as to whether the boundary line should be drawn at the location of Cape Henlopen or at Fenwick Island. There were few settlers in the frontier on either side to take issue. That boundary would finally be settled in 1763 when surveyors Charles Mason and Jeremiah Dixon incorporated the Transpeninsular Line (Mason–Dixon line) as the definitive boundary between Delaware and Maryland.

=== Settlement growth ===
The territory continued to attract new settlers, primarily from Virginia, and by 1666, the territory had met the requirements to become established as a county in the province with its own local government. On August 22, 1666, Lord Baltimore issued a proclamation establishing the new county, including the establishment of a complete civil and military organization. The proclamation established a sheriff and a military commander for the county, and five surveyors charged with laying out a highway to serve the county. In January 1667, the county administration laid out the five initial districts, designated as "Hundreds", into which the county would be divided. Additional hundreds were added as additional knowledge of the area was surveyed.

=== Religious communities ===
Settlement of the county generally proceeded from the Chesapeake Bay eastward, and from old Accomack County northward. The original settlers in the first two settlements were Quakers and Anglicans; and both groups continued to grow from ongoing immigration from the northern portions of the Virginia colony. In the 1670s, Scottish and Irish Presbyterians began to immigrate to the county, some from Virginia, some from the British Isles. In December 1680, a prominent member of the county and professed Anglican, William Stevens of Rehoboth settlement, sent a request to the Presbytery of Laggan in northern Ireland to consider sending a Presbyterian minister to Somerset county; and the first Presbyterian (Reformed) minister, Reverend Francis Makemie, arrived in early 1683, quickly followed by a growing list of additional Irish Presbyterian ministers and missionaries. The towns of Rehoboth and Snow Hill along the Pocomoke River in the eastern (seaside) portion of Somerset County became Presbyterian centers in the county. The work of these Presbyterian ministers and missionaries eventually led to the organization of the Presbytery in Philadelphia in 1706, the forerunner of American Presbyterianism.

In 1689, the "Glorious Revolution" of 1688 in England resulted in the exile of the Roman Catholic King James II. After conquest by invasion, the Protestant Dutch rulers William of Orange-Nassau and Mary of Orange (James II's Protestant daughter) later became King William III, (1650–1702) and Queen Mary II. The "Protestant Revolution" of 1689 in Maryland overthrew the Roman Catholic government, resulting in the reversion of Lord Baltimore's proprietary charter. The Province was converted into a Royal colony (with a later government controlled by the king and his ministers). The capital was moved from the Catholic stronghold at St. Mary's City in southern Maryland to the more central, newly renamed Annapolis on the western shore of the Chesapeake Bay, opposite Kent Island.

In 1692, the Provincial General Assembly established the Church of England as the "established church" of the Province. This put pressure on the Quakers and Presbyterians, who were excluded from political office for a period. Their numbers in the county began a slow decline until the American Revolution.

For more than a century, the county and much of the colony were developed by planters, with the labor of enslaved Africans, for tobacco as a commodity crop. For many years they prospered, but tobacco exhausted the soil. By the early 19th century, after the American Revolutionary War, some planters turned to mixed farming. The Eastern Shore remained primarily rural and steeped in slave society culture. Other parts of Maryland had an increasing proportion of free people of color, and more than half the blacks in the state were free before the Civil War.

=== Connection to Napoleon ===
After the defeat of the French Empire at the hands of the Seventh Coalition in July 1815, emperor Napoleon I sought to flee to the United States to escape imprisonment. According to local legends, Napoleon's brother, Jerome Bonaparte, had previously married Elizabeth Patterson, an American socialite from Baltimore, and through her the Bonapartes had connections to the American gentry, such as the King family in Beverly. According to the 1944 book 'Rivers of the Eastern Shore' by Hulbert Footner, Nicholas Girod, former Mayor of New Orleans, attempted to rescue Napoleon from his exile in British Saint Helena in 1821, the plan being to hide Napoleon in Beverly House in Princess Anne, Somerset County, before transporting him to Napoleon House in New Orleans once the hunt for him subsided. However, Napoleon died before the plot could go ahead.

=== Native Americans ===
As the English colonies expanded, they encroached on Native American land. The coastal areas were occupied primarily by Algonquian language-speaking tribes. The population of the latter decreased, due to disease, warfare and social disruption. Some of the tribes migrated west to the Ohio River Valley or joined with neighboring tribes to the north, such as the Lenape.

Some of the descendants of the tribes of Maryland remained. They intermarried with colonists, including white indentured servants, and African and African-American enslaved workers. Children of Native American mothers were generally absorbed and grew up in their culture, even if mixed-race. The Catholic Church recorded Native American families in southern Maryland. In the late 20th century, many groups of Native American began to reorganize, noting their community continuity. Several tribes have been recognized by the state.

=== Subsequent counties ===
After the Dutch Anglo war, the Dutch Republic lost their North American lands along the North & South Rivers (that is, along the Hudson & the Delaware). The Dutch colony (2 miles X 20 miles) along the Delaware Bay, became Durham County Maryland, With the county seat being Lewes, 1665 until 1669. In 1669 it became part of Somerset County until 1683 when it given to William Penn.

In 1742, Worcester County to the east and the ocean, was organized as the thirteenth county of Maryland by separation from Somerset County. By 1867, portions of Somerset and Worcester counties were ceded to create a 22nd jurisdiction, Wicomico County. (The state in 1872 created a 23rd and final county in the far mountainous west, named Garrett.)

The county has a number of properties on the National Register of Historic Places.

== Geography ==
According to the U.S. Census Bureau, the county has a total area of 610 square miles (1,600 km^{2}), of which 320 square miles (830 km^{2}) is land and 291 square miles (750 km^{2}) (48%) is water.

=== Adjacent counties ===
- Wicomico County (north)
- Accomack County, Virginia (south)
- Dorchester County (northwest)
- Worcester County (east)
- Saint Mary's County (west)

=== State protected area ===
The State of Maryland Deal Island Wildlife Management Area, a protected area, is in the northwest quadrant of the county. It incorporates not only Deal Island but the tributaries of the Chesapeake Bay. It is 13,000 acres (5,300 ha). It has over 9 miles (14 km) of flat trails.

=== Climate ===
The county has a humid subtropical climate (Cfa) with all months significantly above freezing, seven to eight months greater than 50 °F (10 °C),) and three months greater than 22 °C (72 °F).) The hardiness zones are 7b and 8a.

Climate data for Crisfield, Maryland
Month	Jan	Feb	Mar	Apr	May	Jun	Jul	Aug	Sep	Oct	Nov	Dec	Year
Record high °F (°C)	64 (18)	69 (21)	77 (25)	87 (31)	91 (33)	92 (33)	99 (37)	98 (37)	92 (33)	90 (32)	78 (26)	71 (22)	99 (37)
Mean daily maximum °F (°C)	44 (7)	47 (8)	55 (13)	65 (18)	74 (23)	82 (28)	87 (31)	85 (29)	79 (26)	69 (21)	58 (14)	49 (9)	66 (19)
Mean daily minimum °F (°C)	30 (−1)	31 (−1)	38 (3)	48 (9)	57 (14)	66 (19)	71 (22)	71 (22)	64 (18)	53 (12)	43 (6)	34 (1)	51 (10)
Record low °F (°C)	−1 (−18)	3 (−16)	10 (−12)	27 (−3)	38 (3)	46 (8)	51 (11)	50 (10)	45 (7)	30 (−1)	22 (−6)	7 (−14)	−1 (−18)
Average precipitation inches (mm)	3.25 (83)	3.00 (76)	4.29 (109)	2.81 (71)	3.12 (79)	2.83 (72)	4.14 (105)	4.15 (105)	2.76 (70)	2.78 (71)	2.80 (71)	2.51 (64)	38.44 (976)
Source: Weather.com

== Demographics ==
Historical population
Census	Pop.	Note	%±
1790	15,310		—
1800	17,358		13.4%
1810	17,195		−0.9%
1820	19,579		13.9%
1830	20,166		3.0%
1840	19,508		−3.3%
1850	22,456		15.1%
1860	24,992		11.3%
1870	18,190		−27.2%
1880	21,668		19.1%
1890	24,155		11.5%
1900	25,923		7.3%
1910	26,455		2.1%
1920	24,602		−7.0%
1930	23,382		−5.0%
1940	20,965		−10.3%
1950	20,745		−1.0%
1960	19,623		−5.4%
1970	18,924		−3.6%
1980	19,188		1.4%
1990	23,440		22.2%
2000	24,747		5.6%
2010	26,470		7.0%
2020	24,620		−7.0%
2025 (est.)	24,973	▲	1.4%
U.S. Decennial Census; 1790–1960 1900–1990; 1990–2000 2010 2020

=== Racial and ethnic composition ===
Somerset County, Maryland – Racial and ethnic composition Note: the US Census treats Hispanic/Latino as an ethnic category. This table excludes Latinos from the racial categories and assigns them to a separate category. Hispanics/Latinos may be of any race.
Race / Ethnicity (NH = Non-Hispanic)	Pop 1980	Pop 1990	Pop 2000	Pop 2010	Pop 2020	% 1980	% 1990	% 2000	% 2010	% 2020
White alone (NH)	12,404	14,177	13,814	13,796	12,886	64.64%	60.48%	55.82%	52.12%	52.34%
Black or African American alone (NH)	6,581	8,880	10,108	11,082	9,449	34.30%	37.88%	40.85%	41.87%	38.38%
Native American or Alaska Native alone (NH)	19	45	80	83	80	0.10%	0.19%	0.32%	0.31%	0.32%
Asian alone (NH)	45	93	116	183	250	0.23%	0.40%	0.47%	0.69%	1.02%
Native Hawaiian or Pacific Islander alone (NH)	x	x	4	2	1	x	x	0.02%	0.01%	0.00%
Other race alone (NH)	14	16	23	46	69	0.07%	0.07%	0.09%	0.17%	0.28%
Mixed race or Multiracial (NH)	x	x	268	415	810	x	x	1.08%	1.57%	3.29%
Hispanic or Latino (any race)	125	229	334	863	1,075	0.65%	0.98%	1.35%	3.26%	4.37%
Total	19,188	23,440	24,747	26,470	24,620	100.00%	100.00%	100.00%	100.00%	100.00%

=== 2020 census ===
As of the 2020 census, the county had a population of 24,620 and a median age of 39.8 years, with 17.2% of residents under the age of 18 and 18.6% aged 65 or older; for every 100 females there were 120.2 males, and for every 100 females age 18 and over there were 124.7 males. 40.3% of residents lived in urban areas, while 59.7% lived in rural areas.

The racial makeup of the county was 53.1% White, 38.6% Black or African American, 0.5% American Indian and Alaska Native, 1.0% Asian, 0.0% Native Hawaiian and Pacific Islander, 2.7% from some other race, and 4.0% from two or more races. Hispanic or Latino residents of any race comprised 4.4% of the population.

There were 8,334 households in the county, of which 27.2% had children under the age of 18 living with them and 32.1% had a female householder with no spouse or partner present. About 30.9% of all households were made up of individuals and 14.8% had someone living alone who was 65 years of age or older.

There were 10,895 housing units, of which 23.5% were vacant. Among occupied housing units, 64.9% were owner-occupied and 35.1% were renter-occupied. The homeowner vacancy rate was 3.1% and the rental vacancy rate was 11.4%.

=== 2010 census ===
As of the 2010 United States census, there were 26,470 people, 8,788 households, and 5,478 families residing in the county. The population density was 82.8 inhabitants per square mile (32.0/km^{2}). There were 11,130 housing units at an average density of 34.8 per square mile (13.4/km^{2}). The racial makeup of the county was 53.5% white, 42.3% black or African American, 0.7% Asian, 0.3% American Indian, 1.4% from other races, and 1.7% from two or more races. Those of Hispanic or Latino origin made up 3.3% of the population. In terms of ancestry, 13.3% were German, 11.5% were English, 9.2% were American, and 8.3% were Irish.

Of the 8,788 households, 27.7% had children under the age of 18 living with them, 42.1% were married couples living together, 15.3% had a female householder with no husband present, 37.7% were non-families, and 31.5% of all households were made up of individuals. The average household size was 2.37 and the average family size was 2.91. The median age was 36.5 years.

The median income for a household in the county was $42,443 and the median income for a family was $49,759. Males had a median income of $39,307 versus $33,067 for females. The per capita income for the county was $16,919. About 12.7% of families and 18.6% of the population were below the poverty line, including 27.0% of those under age 18 and 12.6% of those age 65 or over.

=== 2000 census ===
As of the census of 2000, there were 24,747 people, 8,361 households, and 5,444 families residing in the county. The population density was 76 inhabitants per square mile (29/km^{2}). There were 10,055 housing units at an average density of 31 per square mile (12/km^{2}). The racial makeup of the county was 56.4% White, 41.1% Black or African American, 0.4% Native American, 0.5% Asian, 0% Pacific Islander, 0.5% from other races, and 1.2% from two or more races. 1.3% of the population were Hispanic or Latino of any race. The largest ancestry groups in the county are Black or African American (41%), English American (16%), German (8%), Irish (8%) and Italian (1%) ancestry.

There were 8,361 households, out of which 38.30% had children under the age of 18 living with them, 46.1% were married couples living together, 15.1% had a female householder with no husband present, and 34.9% were non-families. 15.3% of all households were made up of individuals, and 7.2% had someone living alone who was 65 years of age or older. The average household size was 2.37 and the average family size was 2.92.

In the county, the population was spread out, with 18.5% under the age of 18, 15.7% from 18 to 24, 29.5% from 25 to 44, 22.2% from 45 to 64, and 14.2% who were 65 years of age or older. The median age was 36.5 years. For every 100 females, there were 114.6 males. For every 100 females age 18 and over, there were 119.1 males.

The median income for a household in the county was $29,903, and the median income for a family was $37,643. Males had a median income of $27,496 versus $23,035 for females. The per capita income for the county was $15,965. About 15.0% of families and 20.1% of the population were below the poverty line, including 28.4% of those under age 18 and 19.1% of those age 65 or over.

== Politics and government ==
=== Presidential elections ===
In presidential elections, Somerset is a swing county that typically votes Republican. In 2012, it was one of only a handful of Southern counties to flip from John McCain to Barack Obama, though it swung strongly in favor of Donald Trump in 2016. In 2020 and 2024, Somerset shifted even more towards Trump, the only county in Maryland to do so despite Maryland as a whole voting more Democratic.

Somerset has the longest streak of voting for every incumbent president seeking re-election since 1956. (Note: Donald Trump in 2020, Barack Obama in 2012, George W. Bush in 2004, Bill Clinton in 1996, George H. W. Bush in 1992, Ronald Reagan in 1984, Jimmy Carter in 1980, Richard Nixon in 1972, Lyndon B. Johnson in 1964, and Dwight D. Eisenhower in 1956.) The last time where the county did not vote to reelect the incumbent president was during Franklin D. Roosevelt's fourth successful run in 1944, where it flipped Republican after supporting him in his third run four years earlier. In three elections (1984, 2004, and 2012), Somerset's trend of supporting incumbent presidents led it to flip to the incumbent president after previously not supporting them in their first bids for the White House.

United States presidential election results for Somerset County, Maryland
Year	Republican		Democratic		Third party(ies)	
Year	No.	%	No.	%	No.	%
1836	1,030	66.32%	523	33.68%	0	0.00%
1840	1,516	64.24%	844	35.76%	0	0.00%
1844	1,449	61.63%	902	38.37%	0	0.00%
1848	1,413	58.41%	1,005	41.55%	1	0.04%
1852	1,443	56.41%	1,115	43.59%	0	0.00%
1856	1	0.03%	1,321	45.32%	1,593	54.65%
1860	2	0.07%	89	3.00%	2,875	96.93%
1864	644	23.38%	2,110	76.62%	0	0.00%
1868	421	29.86%	989	70.14%	0	0.00%
1872	1,615	59.01%	1,122	40.99%	0	0.00%
1876	1,786	48.27%	1,914	51.73%	0	0.00%
1880	1,883	52.35%	1,710	47.54%	4	0.11%
1884	2,022	53.14%	1,734	45.57%	49	1.29%
1888	2,072	50.90%	1,625	39.92%	374	9.19%
1892	1,819	45.58%	1,638	41.04%	534	13.38%
1896	2,646	50.80%	2,084	40.01%	479	9.20%
1900	2,855	54.68%	2,017	38.63%	349	6.68%
1904	1,874	51.53%	1,580	43.44%	183	5.03%
1908	1,912	52.11%	1,627	44.34%	130	3.54%
1912	1,528	43.01%	1,617	45.51%	408	11.48%
1916	2,364	53.69%	1,885	42.81%	154	3.50%
1920	3,658	57.57%	2,634	41.45%	62	0.98%
1924	3,230	51.19%	2,903	46.01%	177	2.81%
1928	5,071	68.57%	2,277	30.79%	47	0.64%
1932	3,675	43.01%	4,811	56.30%	59	0.69%
1936	4,770	53.25%	4,116	45.95%	72	0.80%
1940	3,954	47.13%	4,352	51.87%	84	1.00%
1944	3,790	54.81%	3,125	45.19%	0	0.00%
1948	3,129	49.67%	3,112	49.40%	58	0.92%
1952	4,113	50.76%	3,951	48.76%	39	0.48%
1956	4,770	61.15%	3,031	38.85%	0	0.00%
1960	4,030	50.51%	3,948	49.49%	0	0.00%
1964	3,155	41.07%	4,527	58.93%	0	0.00%
1968	2,829	40.14%	2,319	32.91%	1,899	26.95%
1972	4,342	67.33%	2,036	31.57%	71	1.10%
1976	3,254	48.38%	3,472	51.62%	0	0.00%
1980	3,312	47.74%	3,342	48.18%	283	4.08%
1984	4,508	64.68%	2,439	34.99%	23	0.33%
1988	4,222	58.93%	2,911	40.63%	32	0.45%
1992	3,450	43.47%	3,210	40.45%	1,276	16.08%
1996	2,919	40.72%	3,557	49.62%	693	9.67%
2000	3,609	47.46%	3,785	49.78%	210	2.76%
2004	4,884	54.30%	4,034	44.85%	76	0.85%
2008	5,037	50.76%	4,779	48.16%	108	1.09%
2012	5,042	48.49%	5,240	50.39%	117	1.13%
2016	5,341	53.95%	4,196	42.38%	363	3.67%
2020	5,739	56.56%	4,241	41.80%	167	1.65%
2024	5,805	57.27%	4,054	39.99%	278	2.74%

=== Voter registration ===
Voter registration and party enrollment as of March 2024
Republican	6,136	42.83%
Democratic	5,440	37.97%
Unaffiliated	2,518	17.58%
Libertarian	66	0.46%
Other parties	167	1.17%
Total	14,327	100%

=== County commissioners ===
Somerset County is governed by county commissioners, the traditional form of county government in Maryland. Somerset County Commissioners are elected to four-year terms; all current commissioners' terms will expire in 2026.

Somerset County Commissioners
District	Name	Position	Party
4	Charles Laird	President	Republican
5	Randy Laird	Vice-President	Democrat
3	Eldon Willing	Commissioner	Republican
2	Darryl Webster	Commissioner	Republican
1	Craig N. Mathies Sr.	Commissioner	Democrat
n.a.	Ernest J. Leatherbury Jr.	County Administrator	n.a.

=== Sheriffs ===
Stephen Horsey was appointed by the Governor of Maryland as the first sheriff of Somerset County on August 22, 1666, and the Somerset County Sheriff's Office celebrated its 300th anniversary in 2011. The current sheriff is Ronald Howard (Republican), who has been serving as sheriff since 2014.

== Education ==
The Queen Anne's County Public Schools includes Kent Island High School and Queen Anne's County High School.

== Communities ==
=== City ===
- Crisfield

=== Town ===
- Princess Anne (county seat)

=== Census-designated places ===
The Census Bureau recognizes the following census-designated places (CDPs) in the county:

- Chance
- Dames Quarter
- Deal Island
- Eden
- Fairmount
- Frenchtown-Rumbly
- Mount Vernon, historically known in parts as Hog's Neck, Cow Island or Jason
- Smith Island
- West Pocomoke

=== Unincorporated communities ===
- Ewell
- Kingston
- Manokin
- Marion Station
- Oriole
- Rehobeth
- Rhodes Point
- Shelltown
- Tylerton
- Upper Fairmount
- Upper Falls
- Wenona
- Westover

== See also ==
- National Register of Historic Places listings in Somerset County, Maryland
