= 1852 United States presidential election in Maryland =

- November 2, 1852
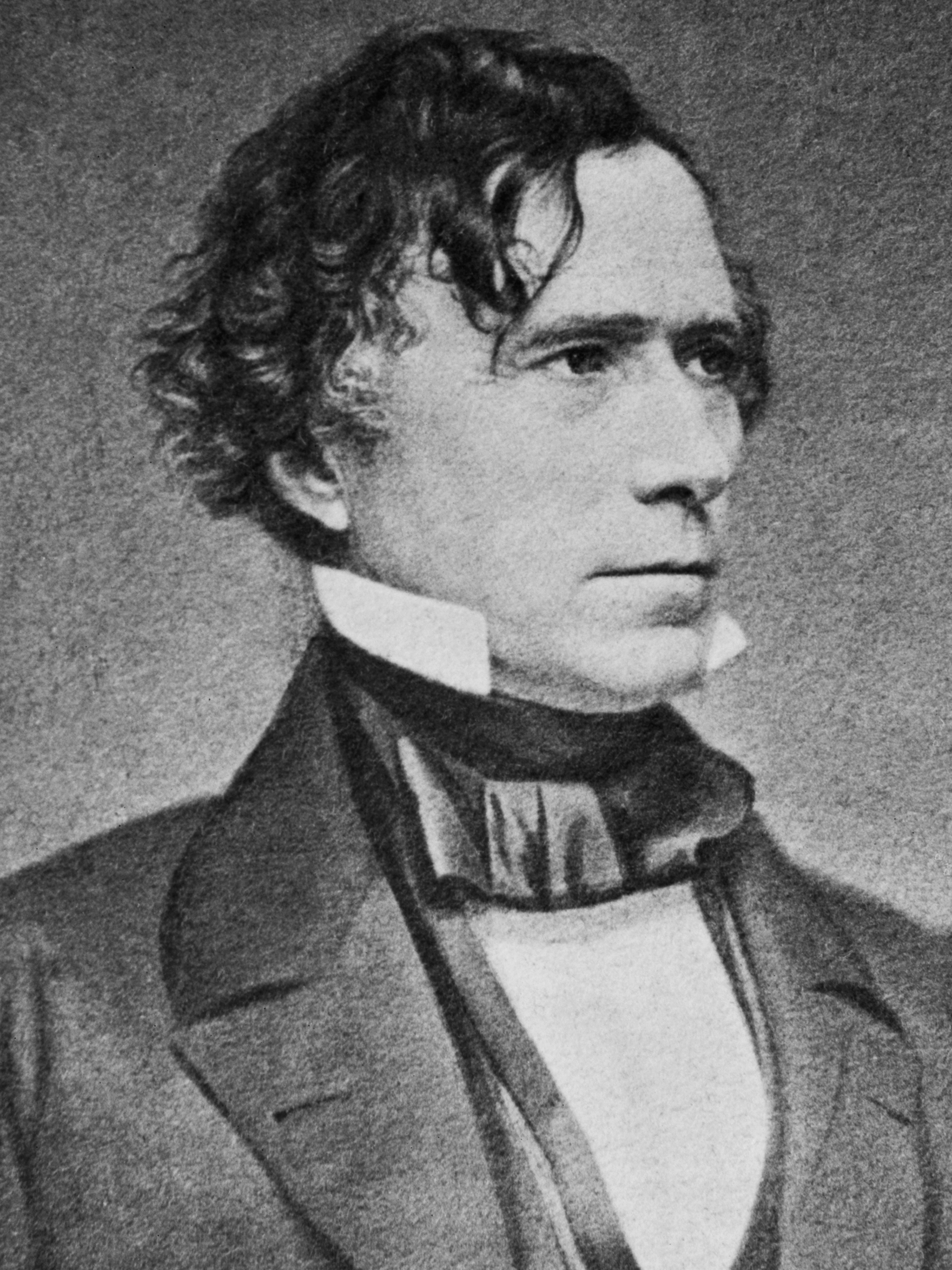

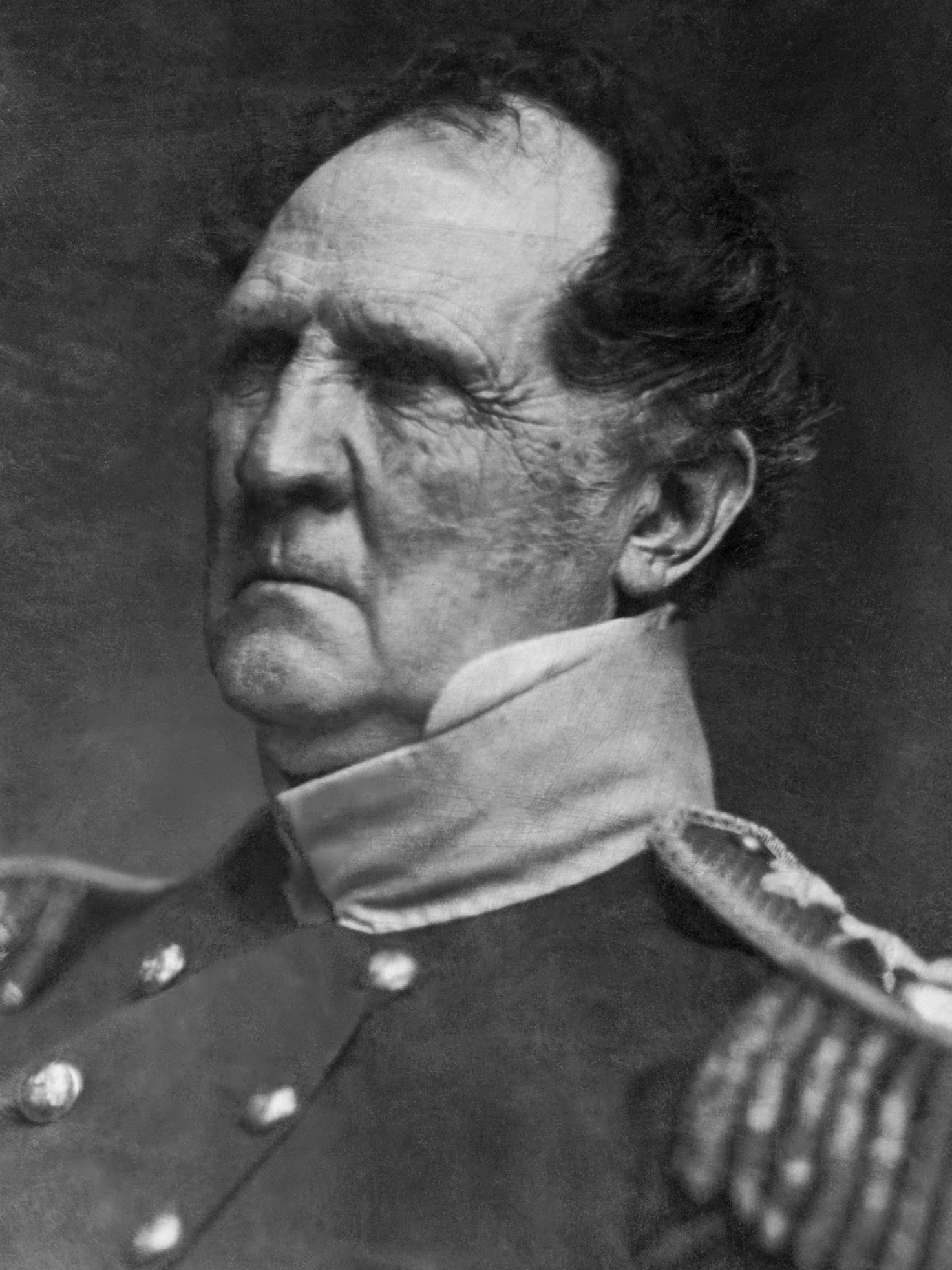
Nominee	Franklin Pierce	Winfield Scott
Party	Democratic	Whig
Home state	New Hampshire	New Jersey
Running mate	William R. King	William Alexander Graham
Electoral vote	8	0
Popular vote	40,022	35,077
Percentage	53.28%	46.69%
County results
Pierce
50–60%
Scott
50–60%
60–70%
President before election
Millard Fillmore
Whig
Elected President
Franklin Pierce
Democratic

The 1852 United States presidential election in Maryland took place on November 2, 1852, as part of the 1852 United States presidential election. Voters chose eight representatives, or electors to the Electoral College, who voted for President and Vice President.

Maryland voted for the Democratic candidate, Franklin Pierce, over Whig candidate Winfield Scott. Pierce won Maryland by a margin of 6.59%. This was the first presidential election in which Maryland voted Democratic. In addition, in 1851, Baltimore became an independent city, and had its election results calculated separately from Baltimore County for the first time. Also, Howard County voted for president for the first time in its history.

== Results ==
1852 United States presidential election in Maryland
Party	Candidate	Running mate	Popular vote		Electoral vote	
Party	Candidate	Running mate	Count	%	Count	%
Democratic	Franklin Pierce of New Hampshire	William R. King of Alabama	40,022	53.28%	8	100.00%
Whig	Winfield Scott of New Jersey	William Alexander Graham of North Carolina	35,077	46.69%	0	0.00%
Free Soil	John P. Hale of New Hampshire	George W. Julian of Indiana	21	0.03%	0	0.00%
Total			75,120	100.00%	8	100.00%

=== Results by county ===
County	Franklin Pierce Democratic		Winfield Scott Whig		John P. Hale Free Soil		Margin		Total votes cast
County	#	%	#	%	#	%	#	%	Total votes cast
Allegany	1620	50.59%	1579	49.31%	3	0.09%	41	1.28%	3202
Anne Arundel	1486	46.67%	1693	53.17%	5	0.16%	-207	-6.50%	3184
Baltimore (City)	10995	51.04%	10474	48.62%	72	0.33%	521	2.42%	21541
Baltimore (County)	2669	51.30%	2527	48.57%	7	0.13%	142	2.73%	5203
Calvert	334	43.73%	431	56.27%	0	0.00%	-96	-12.53%	766
Caroline	580	54.10%	492	45.90%	0	0.00%	88	8.21%	1072
Carroll	1672	48.58%	1763	51.22%	7	0.20%	-91	-2.64%	3442
Cecil	1444	48.92%	1504	50.95%	4	0.14%	-60	-2.03%	2952
Charles	398	34.10%	769	65.90%	0	0.00%	-371	-31.80%	1167
Dorchester	820	37.49%	1367	62.51%	0	0.00%	-547	-25.01%	2187
Frederick	2983	48.42%	3158	51.26%	20	0.32%	-175	-2.84%	6161
Harford	1253	45.17%	1521	54.83%	0	0.00%	-268	-9.66%	2774
Howard	625	52.30%	570	47.70%	0	0.00%	55	4.60%	1195
Kent	447	40.82%	645	58.90%	3	0.27%	-198	18.08%	1095
Montgomery	771	42.15%	1057	57.79%	1	0.05%	-286	-15.64%	1829
Prince George's	733	41.06%	1051	58.88%	1	0.06%	-318	-17.82%	1785
Queen Anne's	612	45.77%	725	54.23%	0	0.00%	-113	-8.45%	1337
St. Mary's	422	34.88%	788	65.12%	0	0.00%	-366	-30.25%	1210
Somerset	1005	41.55%	1413	58.41%	1	0.04%	-408	-16.87%	2419
Talbot	719	50.42%	706	49.51%	1	0.02%	13	0.91%	1426
Washington	2434	47.51%	2688	52.74%	1	0.02%	-254	-4.96%	5123
Worcester	1130	45.55%	1351	54.45%	0	0.00%	-221	-8.91%	2481
Total	40022	53.28%	35077	46.69%	21	0.03%	4945	6.59%	75120

== See also ==
- United States presidential elections in Maryland
- 1852 United States presidential election
- 1852 United States elections
