= 1940 United States presidential election in Maryland =

- November 5, 1940

All 8 Maryland votes to the Electoral College

Nominee	Franklin D. Roosevelt	Wendell Willkie
Party	Democratic	Republican
Home state	New York	New York
Running mate	Henry A. Wallace	Charles L. McNary
Electoral vote	8	0
Popular vote	384,546	269,534
Percentage	58.25%	40.83%
County results
Roosevelt
50–60%
60–70%
Willkie
40–50%
50–60%
60–70%
President before election
Franklin D. Roosevelt
Democratic
Elected President
Franklin D. Roosevelt
Democratic

The 1940 United States presidential election in Maryland took place on November 5, 1940, as part of the 1940 United States presidential election. State voters chose eight representatives, or electors, to the Electoral College, who voted for president and vice president.

Maryland was won by incumbent President Franklin D. Roosevelt (D–New York), running with Secretary of Agriculture Henry A. Wallace, with 58.25% of the popular vote, against Wendell Willkie (R–New York), running with Minority Leader Charles L. McNary, with 40.83% of the popular vote.

This is the first time since 1880 that a Democrat carried ancestrally Federalist Calvert County, and would be the only instance during the 80 years between 1880 and 1960 that a Democrat would carry the county. It was only the fourth time that the party carried the county overall, despite it having participating in every single election since the creation of the Democratic Party. The others were 1864, 1868, and the aforementioned 1880.

Maryland weighed in for this election as Roosevelt's strongest performance in any of the antebellum Union States. In this election, Maryland voted 7.47% to the left of the nation at-large.

== Results ==
1940 United States presidential election in Maryland
Party	Candidate	Votes	%
Democratic	Franklin D. Roosevelt (inc.)	384,546	58.25%
Republican	Wendell Willkie	269,534	40.83%
Socialist	Norman Thomas	4,093	0.62%
Communist	Earl Browder	1,274	0.19%
Socialist Labor	John Aiken	657	0.10%
Write-ins	Roger Babson	13	0.00%
Total votes		660,117	100%

=== Results by county ===
County	Franklin Delano Roosevelt Democratic		Wendell Lewis Willkie Republican		Various candidates Other parties		Margin		Total votes cast
County	#	%	#	%	#	%	#	%	Total votes cast
Allegany	18,456	55.18%	14,804	44.26%	188	0.56%	3,652	10.92%	33,448
Anne Arundel	13,116	58.54%	9,204	41.08%	85	0.38%	3,912	17.46%	22,405
Baltimore	30,360	53.08%	26,652	46.60%	186	0.33%	3,708	6.48%	57,198
Baltimore City	199,715	63.20%	112,364	35.56%	3,917	1.24%	87,351	27.64%	315,996
Calvert	2,149	50.61%	2,067	48.68%	30	0.71%	82	1.93%	4,246
Caroline	3,284	51.30%	3,087	48.23%	30	0.47%	197	3.08%	6,401
Carroll	5,833	41.14%	8,300	58.54%	45	0.32%	-2,467	-17.40%	14,178
Cecil	5,360	57.71%	3,878	41.75%	50	0.54%	1,482	15.96%	9,288
Charles	2,692	49.27%	2,716	49.71%	56	1.02%	-24	-0.44%	5,464
Dorchester	6,088	60.11%	3,953	39.03%	87	0.86%	2,135	21.08%	10,128
Frederick	11,255	51.55%	10,485	48.02%	93	0.43%	770	3.53%	21,833
Garrett	2,805	38.80%	4,387	60.68%	38	0.53%	-1,582	-21.88%	7,230
Harford	5,500	45.61%	6,501	53.91%	59	0.49%	-1,001	-8.30%	12,060
Howard	3,957	55.98%	3,082	43.60%	30	0.42%	875	12.38%	7,069
Kent	3,014	53.05%	2,639	46.45%	28	0.49%	375	6.60%	5,681
Montgomery	15,177	51.41%	13,831	46.85%	513	1.74%	1,346	4.56%	29,521
Prince George's	16,592	63.21%	9,523	36.28%	136	0.52%	7,069	26.93%	26,251
Queen Anne's	3,581	58.46%	2,508	40.94%	37	0.60%	1,073	17.52%	6,126
Somerset	4,352	51.87%	3,954	47.13%	84	1.00%	398	4.74%	8,390
St. Mary's	2,860	54.95%	2,301	44.21%	44	0.85%	559	10.74%	5,205
Talbot	3,689	45.51%	4,368	53.89%	49	0.60%	-679	-8.38%	8,106
Washington	14,125	55.91%	11,054	43.76%	83	0.33%	3,071	12.16%	25,262
Wicomico	7,198	59.92%	4,741	39.47%	73	0.61%	2,457	20.45%	12,012
Worcester	3,388	51.29%	3,135	47.46%	83	1.26%	253	3.83%	6,606
Totals	384,546	58.26%	269,534	40.83%	6,024	0.91%	115,012	17.42%	660,104

==== Counties that flipped from Republican to Democratic ====
- Calvert
- Somerset

==== Counties that flipped from Democratic to Republican ====
- Harford
- Talbot

== See also ==
- United States presidential elections in Maryland
- 1940 United States presidential election
- 1940 United States elections
