= 1848 United States presidential election in Maryland =

- November 7, 1848
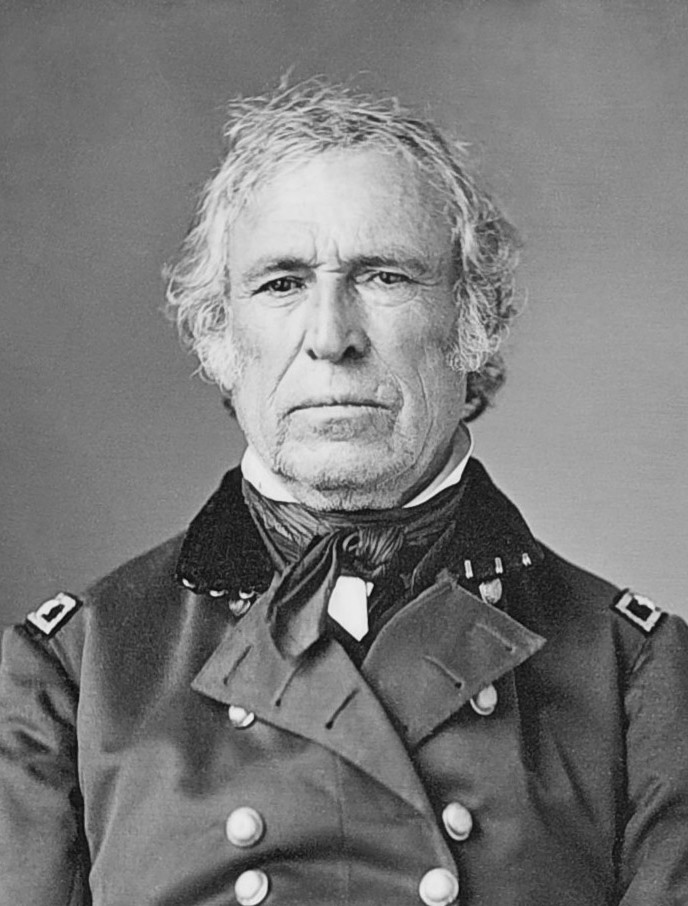

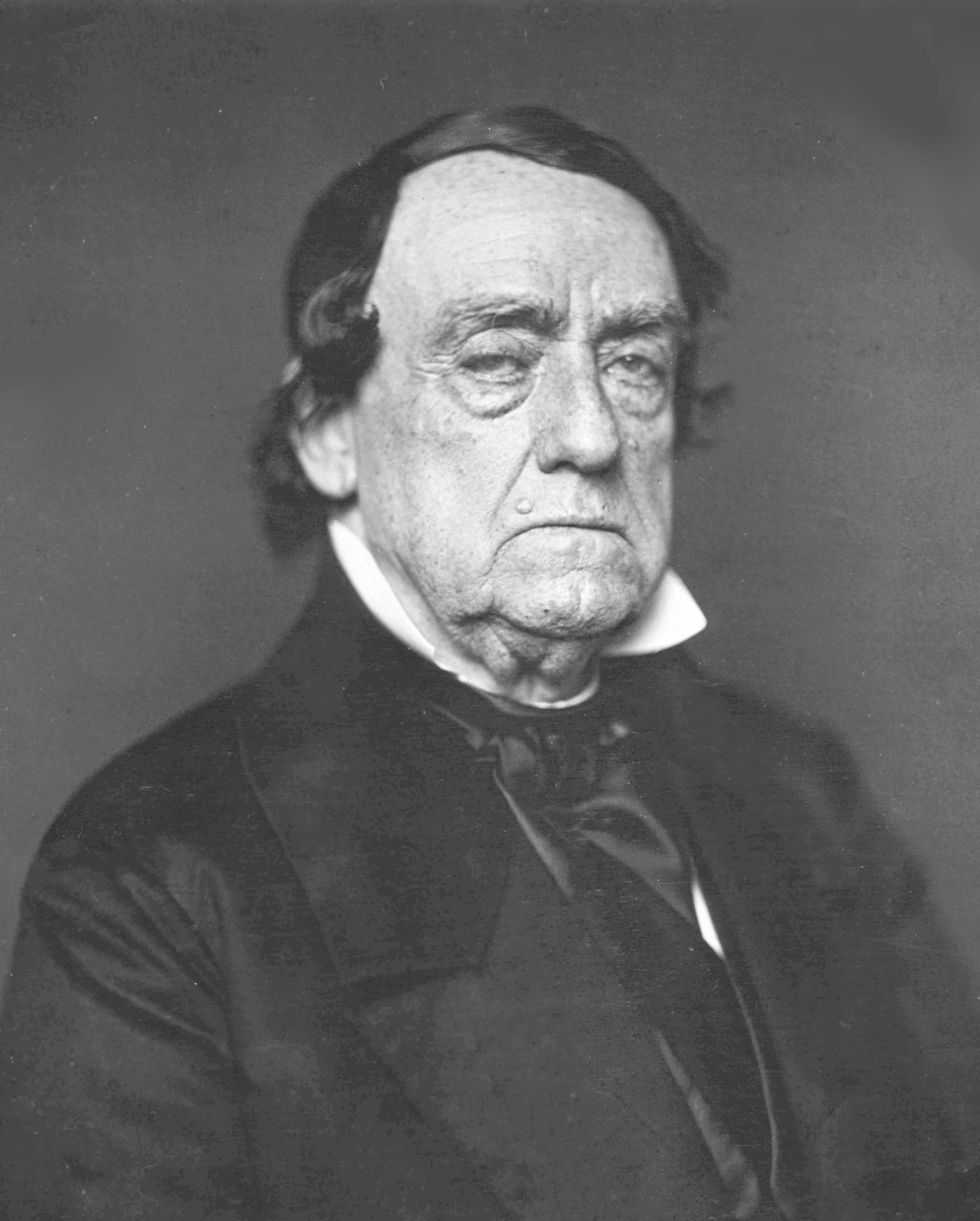
Nominee	Zachary Taylor	Lewis Cass
Party	Whig	Democratic
Home state	Louisiana	Michigan
Running mate	Millard Fillmore	William O. Butler
Electoral vote	8	0
Popular vote	37,702	34,528
Percentage	52.10%	47.72%
County results
Taylor
50–60%
60–70%
Cass
50–60%
President before election
James K. Polk
Democratic
Elected President
Zachary Taylor
Whig

The 1848 United States presidential election in Maryland took place on November 7, 1848, as part of the 1848 United States presidential election. Voters chose eight representatives, or electors to the Electoral College, who voted for president and vice president.

Maryland voted for the Whig candidate, Zachary Taylor, over Democratic candidate Lewis Cass. Taylor won Maryland by a narrow margin of 4.38%.

== Results ==
1848 United States presidential election in Maryland
Party	Candidate	Running mate	Popular vote		Electoral vote	
Party	Candidate	Running mate	Count	%	Count	%
Whig	Zachary Taylor of Louisiana	Millard Fillmore of New York	37,702	52.10%	8	100.00%
Democratic	Lewis Cass of Michigan	William O. Butler of Kentucky	34,528	47.72%	0	0.00%
Free Soil	Martin Van Buren of New York	Charles Francis Adams Sr. of Massachusetts	129	0.18%	0	0.00%
Total			72,359	100.00%	8	100.00%

=== Results by county ===
County	Zachary Taylor Whig		Lewis Cass Democratic		Martin Van Buren Free Soil		Margin		Total votes cast
County	#	%	#	%	#	%	#	%	Total votes cast
Allegany	1579	49.31%	1620	50.59%	3	0.09%	-41	-1.28%	3202
Anne Arundel	1693	53.17%	1486	46.67%	5	0.16%	207	6.50%	3184
Baltimore (City and County)	13001	48.61%	13664	51.09%	79	0.30%	-742	-2.18%	26744
Calvert	431	56.27%	335	43.73%	0	0.00%	96	12.53%	766
Caroline	492	45.90%	580	54.10%	0	0.00%	-88	-8.21%	1072
Carroll	1763	51.22%	1672	48.58%	7	0.20%	91	2.64%	3442
Cecil	1504	50.95%	1444	48.92%	4	0.14%	60	2.03%	2952
Charles	769	65.90%	398	34.10%	0	0.00%	371	31.79%	1167
Dorchester	1367	62.51%	820	37.49%	0	0.00%	547	25.01%	2187
Frederick	3158	51.26%	2983	48.42%	20	0.32%	175	2.84%	6161
Harford	1521	54.83%	1253	45.17%	0	0.00%	268	9.66%	2774
Kent	645	58.90%	447	40.82%	3	0.05%	198	18.08%	1095
Montgomery	1057	57.79%	771	42.15%	1	0.05%	286	15.64%	1829
Prince George's	1051	58.88%	733	41.06%	1	0.06%	318	17.82%	1785
Queen Anne's	725	54.23%	612	45.77%	0	0.00%	113	8.45%	1337
St. Mary's	788	65.12%	422	34.88%	0	0.00%	366	30.25%	1210
Somerset	1413	58.41%	1005	41.5%	1	0.04%	408	16.87%	2419
Talbot	706	49.51%	719	50.42%	1	0.07%	-13	-0.91%	1426
Washington	2688	52.74%	2434	47.51%	1	0.02%	254	49.6%	5123
Worcester	1351	54.45%	1130	45.55%	0	0.00%	221	8.91%	2481
Total	37702	52.10%	34528	47.72%	129	0.18%	3045	4.38%	72359

==== Counties that flipped from Whig to Democratic ====
- Caroline
- Talbot

== See also ==
- United States presidential elections in Maryland
- 1848 United States presidential election
- 1848 United States elections
