= 1836 United States presidential election in Maryland =

- November 14, 1836
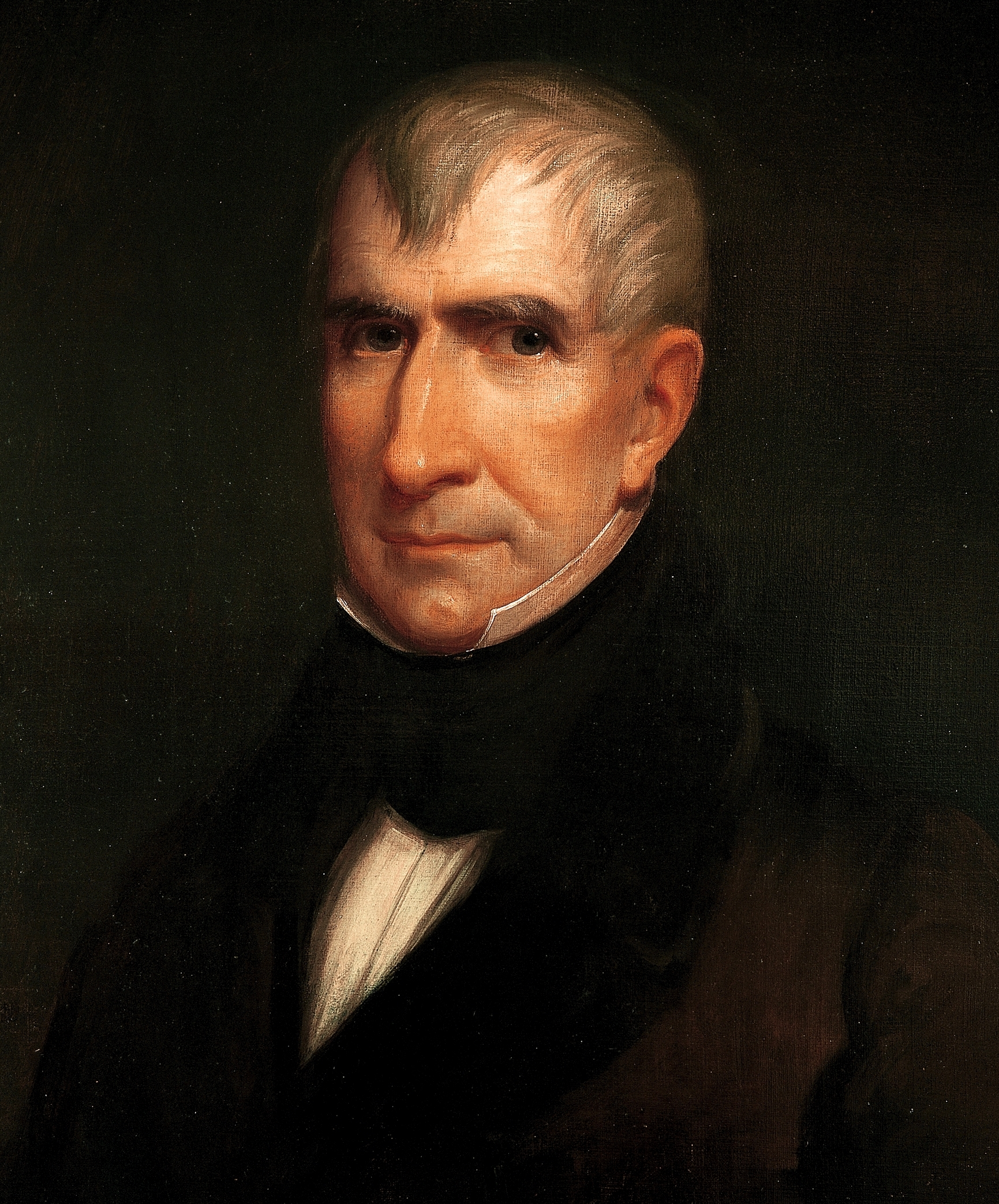

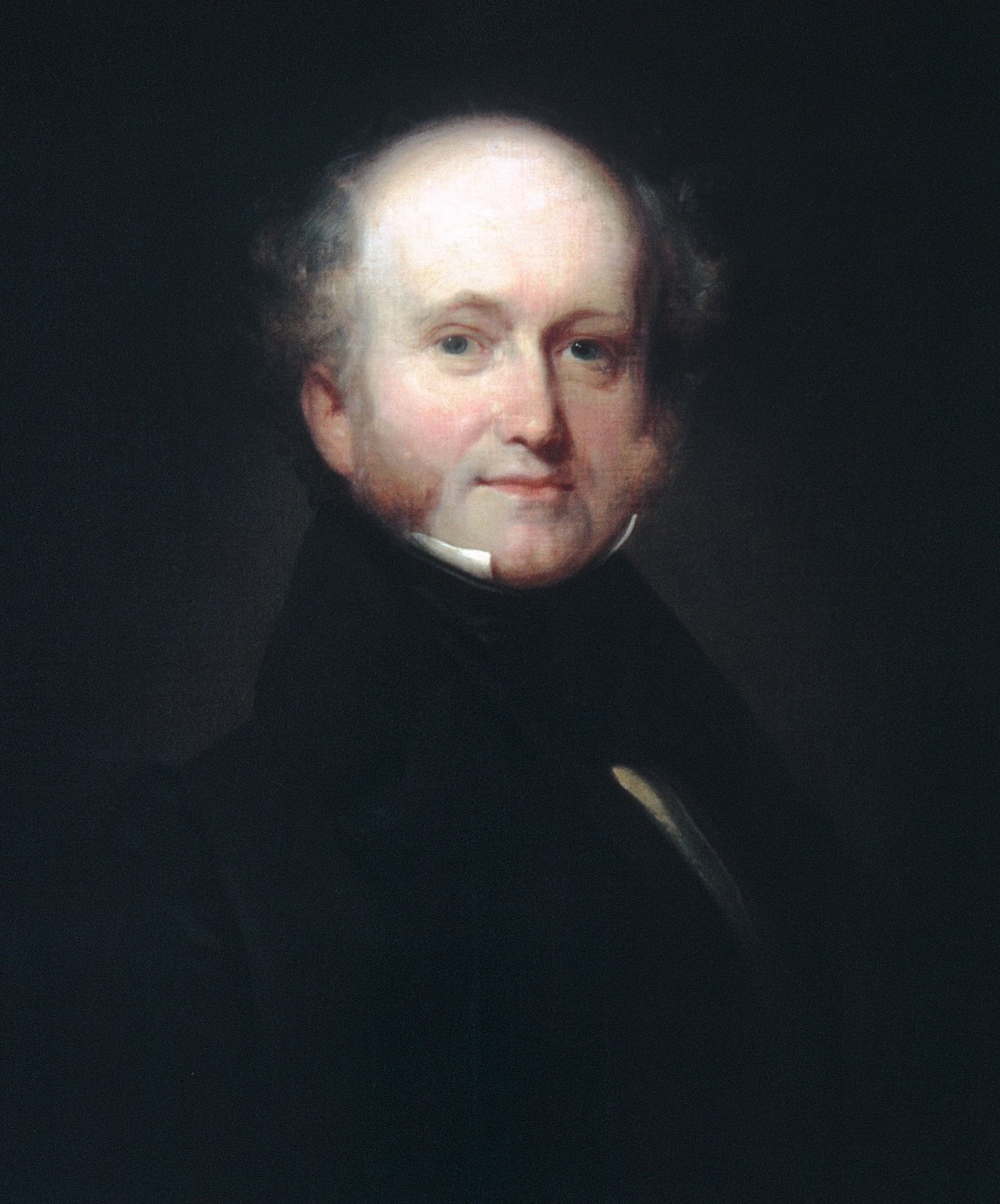
Nominee	William Henry Harrison	Martin Van Buren
Party	Whig	Democratic
Home state	Ohio	New York
Running mate	John Tyler	Richard Mentor Johnson
Electoral vote	10	0
Popular vote	25,852	22,267
Percentage	53.73%	46.27%
County results
Harrison
50–60%
60–70%
70–80%
Van Buren
50–60%
No Vote/Data
President before election
Andrew Jackson
Democratic
Elected President
Martin Van Buren
Democratic

The 1836 United States presidential election in Maryland was held on November 14, 1836, as part of the 1836 United States presidential election. Voters chose 10 representatives, or electors to the Electoral College, who voted for President and Vice President.

Maryland voted for Whig candidate William Henry Harrison over the Democratic candidate, Martin Van Buren. Harrison won Maryland by a margin of 7.46%.

== Results ==
1836 United States presidential election in Maryland
Party	Candidate	Votes	Percentage	Electoral votes
Whig	William Henry Harrison	25,852	53.73%	10
Democratic	Martin Van Buren	22,267	46.27%	0
Totals		48,119	100.0%	10

=== Results by county ===
County	William Henry Harrison Whig		Martin Van Buren Democratic		Margin		Total votes cast
County	#	%	#	%	#	%	Total votes cast
Allegany	926	56.77%	705	43.23%	221	13.55%	1631
Anne Arundel	1248	55.25%	1011	44.75%	237	10.49%	2259
Baltimore (City and County)	6699	44.89%	8222	55.11%	-1523	-10.22%	14,921
Calvert	363	56.11%	284	43.89%	79	12.21%	647
Caroline	576	53.93%	492	46.07%	84	7.87%	1068
Cecil	1020	48.30%	1092	51.70%	-72	-3.41%	2112
Charles	514	59.08%	356	40.92%	158	18.16%	870
Dorchester	966	58.19%	694	41.81%	272	16.39%	1660
Frederick	3130	50.94%	3015	49.06%	115	1.87%	6145
Harford	1080	54.00%	920	46.00%	160	8.00%	2000
Kent	589	61.61%	367	38.39%	222	23.22%	956
Montgomery	936	64.51%	515	35.49%	421	29.01%	1451
Prince George's	728	61.80%	450	38.20%	278	23.60%	1178
Queen Anne's	637	55.20%	517	44.80%	120	10.40%	1154
St. Mary's	643	77.19%	190	22.81%	453	54.38%	833
Somerset	1030	66.32%	523	33.68%	507	32.65%	1553
Talbot	656	57.80%	479	42.20%	177	15.59%	1135
Washington	2079	51.03%	1995	48.97%	84	2.06%	4074
Worcester	1032	65.61%	541	34.39%	491	31.21%	1573
Total	25852	53.73%	22267	46.27%	3585	7.46%	481119

==== Counties that flipped from Democratic to Whig ====
- Anne Arundel
- Harford
- Queen Anne's
- Washington

==== Counties that flipped from National Republican to Whig ====
- Calvert
- Caroline
- Dorchester
- Frederick
- Charles
- Kent
- Montgomery
- Prince George's
- Somerset
- St. Mary's
- Talbot
- Worcester

== See also ==
- United States presidential elections in Maryland
- 1836 United States presidential election
- 1836 United States elections
