= 1872 United States presidential election in Maryland =

- November 5, 1872
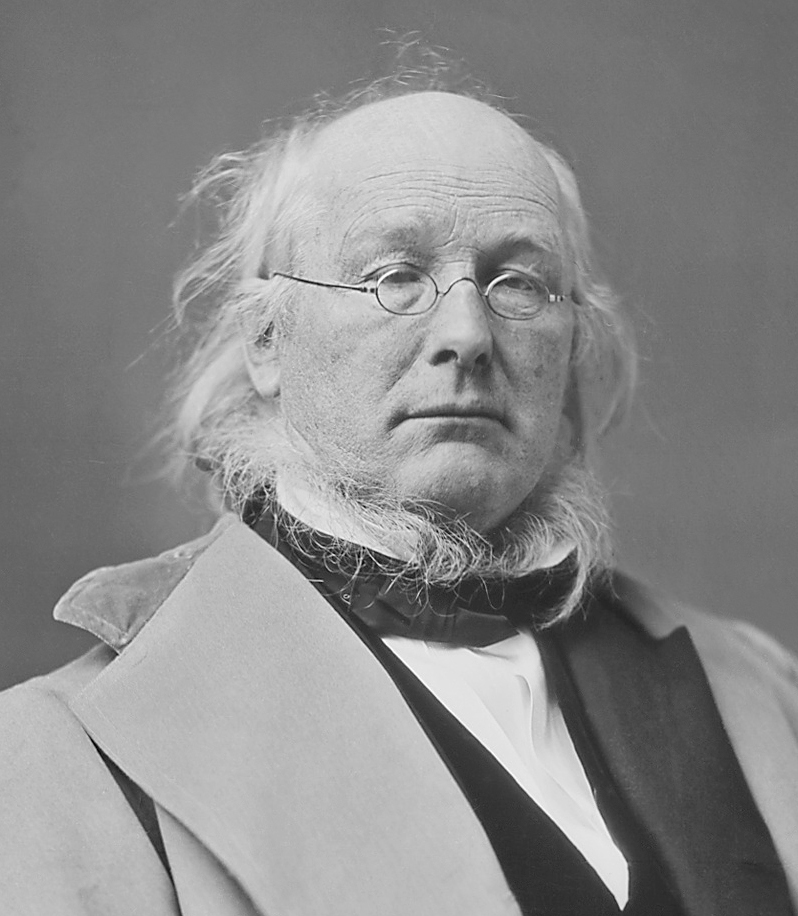

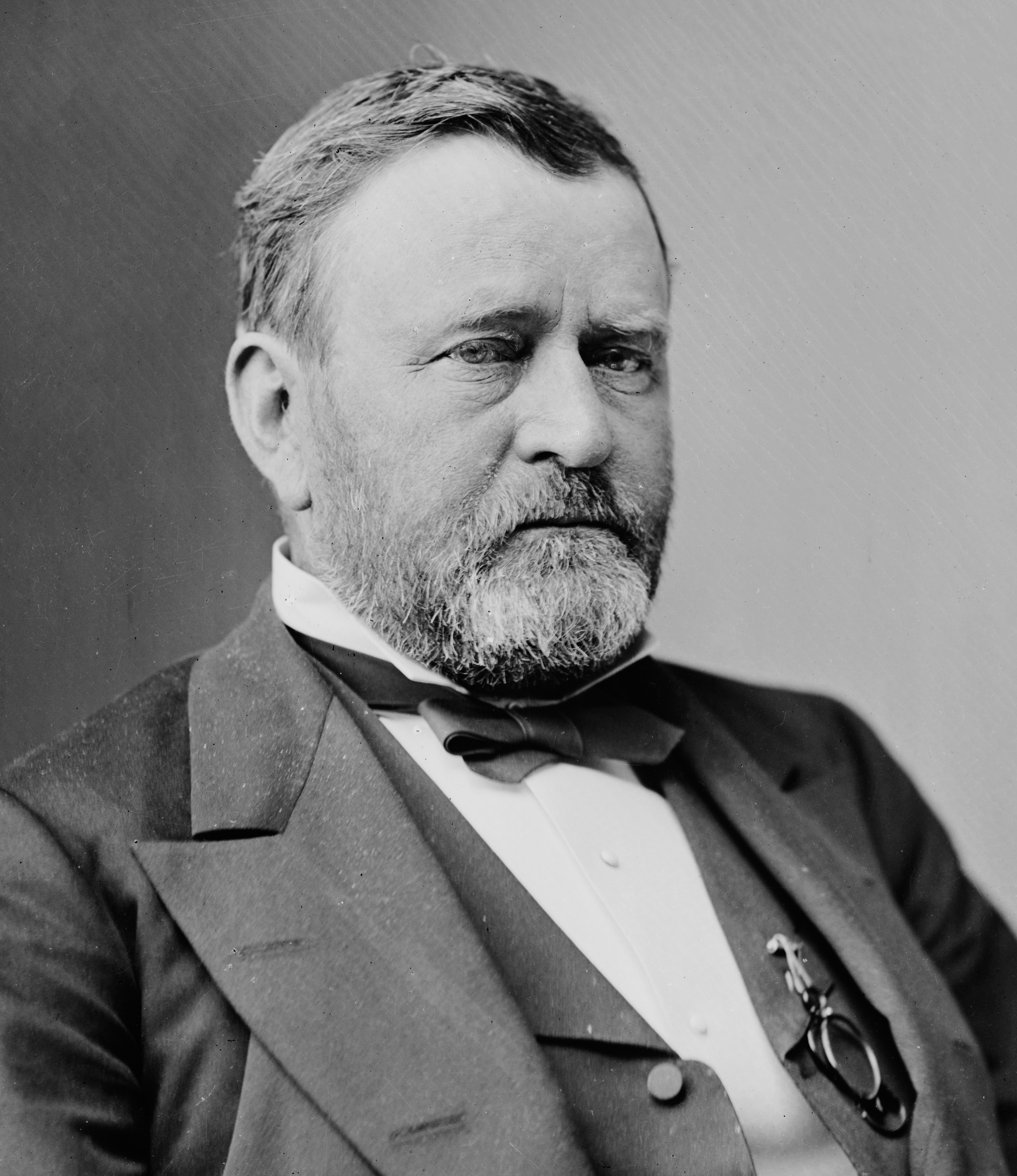
Nominee	Horace Greeley	Ulysses S. Grant
Party	Liberal Republican	Republican
Home state	New York	Illinois
Running mate	Benjamin G. Brown	Henry Wilson
Popular vote	67,687	66,760
Percentage	50.34%	49.66%
County results
Greeley
50–60%
Grant
50–60%
60–70%
President before election
Ulysses S. Grant
Republican
Elected President
Ulysses S. Grant
Republican
- Electoral College vote
- December 17, 1872

8 members of the Electoral College from Maryland
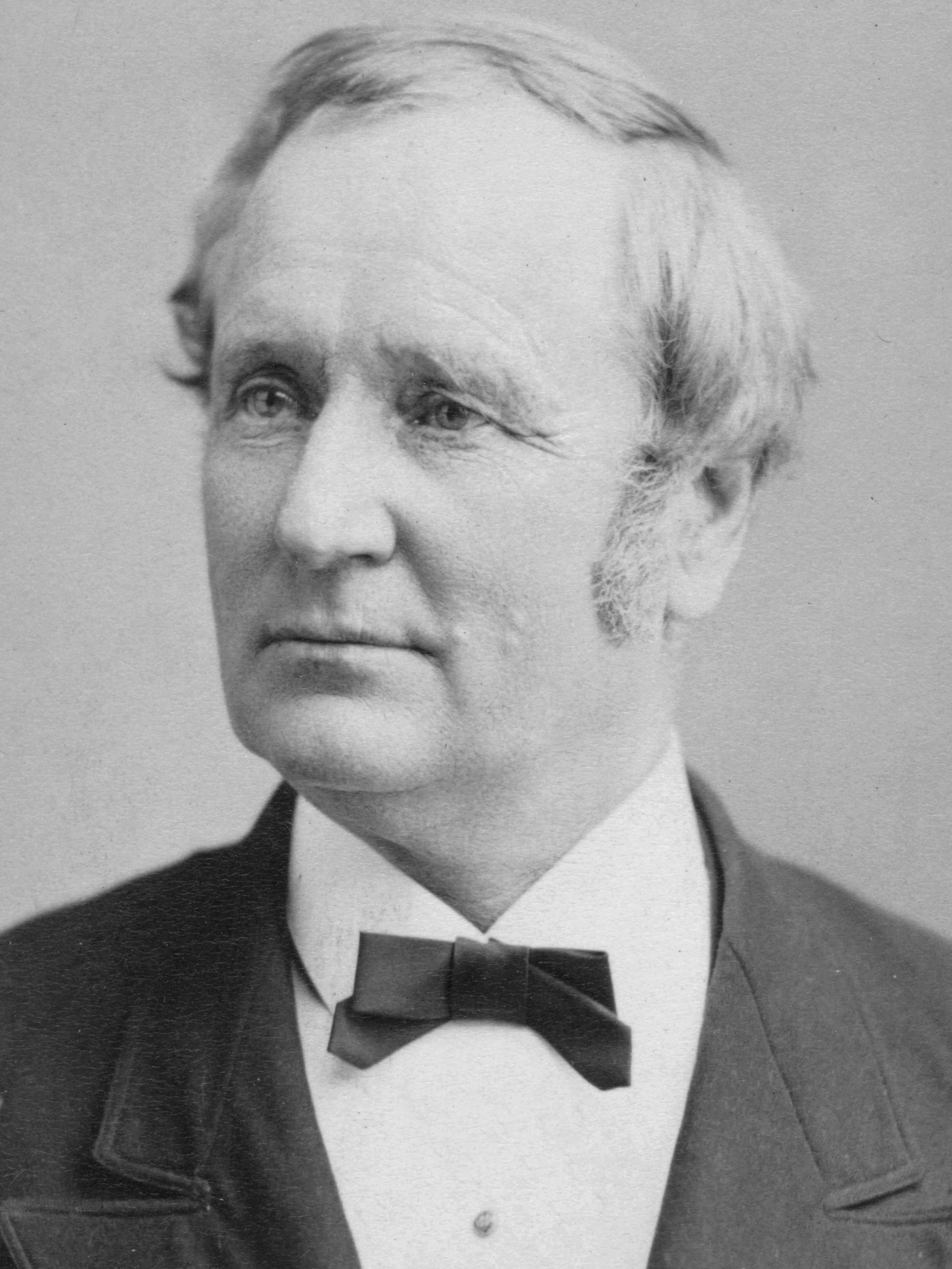
Candidate	Thomas A. Hendricks
Party	Democratic
Home state	Indiana
Running mate	Benjamin Gratz Brown
Electoral vote	8

The 1872 United States presidential election in Maryland took place on November 5, 1872. All contemporary 37 states were part of the 1872 United States presidential election. The state voters chose eight electors to the Electoral College, which selected the president and vice president.

Maryland was won by the Liberal Republican and Democratic nominees, former Congressman Horace Greeley of New York and his running mate former Senator and Governor Benjamin Gratz Brown of Missouri. Greely and Brown defeated the Republican nominees, incumbent President Ulysses S. Grant of Illinois and his running mate Senator Henry Wilson of Massachusetts.

Greeley won the state by a narrow margin of 0.68%. However, he died prior to the Electoral College meeting, allowing for Maryland's eight electors to vote for the candidate of their choice.

In this election, Maryland voted 12.49% more Democratic than the nation at-large.

== Results ==
1872 United States presidential election in Maryland
Party	Candidate	Running mate	Popular vote		Electoral vote	
Party	Candidate	Running mate	Count	%	Count	%
Liberal Republican	Horace Greeley of New York	Benjamin Gratz Brown of Missouri	67,687	50.34%	0 (Note: Eight electors were pledged to Greeley, who had died after the election but before the meeting of the Electoral College; these electors voted for Hendricks.)	0.00%
Democratic	Thomas A. Hendricks of Indiana	N/A of N/A		0.00%	8	100.00%
Republican	Ulysses S. Grant of Illinois	Henry Wilson of Massachusetts	66,760	49.66%	0	0.00%
Total			134,447	100.00%	8	100.00%

=== Results by county ===
County	Horace Greeley Liberal Republican		Ulysses S. Grant Republican		Other		Margin		Total votes cast
County	#	%	#	%	#	%	#	%	Total votes cast
Allegany	2695	44.95%	3301	55.05%	0	0.00%	-606	-10.11%	5996
Anne Arundel	2249	46.90%	2546	53.10%	0	0.00%	-297	-6.19%	4795
Baltimore (City)	24694	55.85%	19522	44.15%	0	0.00%	5172	11.70%	44216
Baltimore (County)	4173	52.51%	3774	47.49%	0	0.00%	399	5.02%	7947
Calvert	692	39.27%	1070	60.73%	0	0.00%	-378	-21.45%	1762
Caroline	1036	48.32%	1108	51.68%	0	0.00%	-72	3.36%	2144
Carroll	2505	49.19%	2587	50.81%	0	0.00%	-82	-1.61%	5092
Cecil	2103	45.23%	2547	54.77%	0	0.00%	-444	9.55%	4650
Charles	1200	43.00%	1591	57.00%	0	0.00%	-391	-14.01%	2791
Dorchester	1755	48.66%	1852	51.34%	0	0.00%	-97	-2.69%	3607
Frederick	4065	43.94%	5186	56.06%	0	0.00%	-1121	-12.12%	9251
Harford	1955	48.01%	2177	51.99%	0	0.00%	-162	-3.98%	4072
Howard	1196	47.74%	1309	52.26%	0	0.00%	-113	-4.51%	2505
Kent	1623	49.47%	1658	50.53%	0	0.00%	-35	-1.07%	3281
Montgomery	2121	52.11%	1949	47.89%	0	0.00%	172	4.23%	4070
Prince George's	1631	41.87%	2264	58.13%	0	0.00%	-633	-16.25%	3895
Queen Anne's	1804	52.17%	1654	47.83%	0	0.00%	150	4.34%	3458
St. Mary's	1139	42.28%	1536	57.02%	19	0.71%	-397	-14.74%	2694
Somerset	1122	40.99%	1615	50.91%	0	0.00%	-493	-18.01%	2737
Talbot	1521	47.77%	1663	52.23%	0	0.00%	-142	-4.46%	3184
Washington	3204	46.38%	3664	53.04%	40	0.58%	-460	-6.66%	6908
Wicomico	1470	57.62%	1081	42.38%	0	0.00%	389	15.25%	2551
Worcester	1734	59.79%	1166	40.21%	0	0.00%	568	19.59%	2900
Total	67687	50.34%	66760	49.66%	59				134447

==== Counties that flipped from Democratic to Republican ====
- Alleghany
- Anne Arundel
- Calvert
- Caroline
- Carroll
- Cecil
- Charles
- Dorchester
- Harford
- Howard
- Kent
- Prince George's
- St. Mary's
- Somerset
- Talbot
- Washington

==== Counties that flipped from Democratic to Liberal Republican ====
- Baltimore (city)
- Baltimore
- Montgomery
- Queen Anne's
- Wicomico
- Worcester

== See also ==
- United States presidential elections in Maryland
- 1872 United States presidential election
- 1872 United States elections
