= 1984 United States presidential election in Maryland =

- November 6, 1984
- Turnout: 75.26%

Nominee	Ronald Reagan	Walter Mondale
Party	Republican	Democratic
Home state	California	Minnesota
Running mate	George H. W. Bush	Geraldine Ferraro
Electoral vote	10	0
Popular vote	879,918	787,935
Percentage	52.51%	47.02%
County results
Reagan
50–60%
60–70%
70–80%
Mondale
50–60%
70–80%
President before election
Ronald Reagan
Republican
Elected President
Ronald Reagan
Republican

The 1984 United States presidential election in Maryland took place on November 6, 1984, as part of the 1984 United States presidential election. Voters chose 10 representatives, or electors to the Electoral College, who voted for president and vice president.

Maryland was won by incumbent President Ronald Reagan (R-California), with 52.51% of the popular vote, over former Vice President Walter Mondale (D-Minnesota) with 47.02% of the popular vote, a 5.49% margin. Despite Reagan's victory in the state, it voted 12.73% more Democratic than the nation amidst his 49-state landslide. Maryland weighed in as the Democratic Party's strongest state in the South for the first time, a distinction that it has held in every election since bar 1992 and 1996 (in which it was second to Bill Clinton's native Arkansas), and 1988 (in which it was second to the heavily unionized West Virginia).

Reagan won all but one of the state's 23 counties. The race was close, however, due to Mondale's strong performances in largely African-American Baltimore City and Prince George's County. Reagan also won Montgomery County in the Washington suburbs by only 888 votes out of almost 300,000 cast; this was the last time to date that a Republican has won this county. This also marks the last time the Democratic candidate was held below 60% of the vote in neighboring Prince George's County.

Maryland was one of five states, alongside Georgia, Hawaii, West Virginia and Rhode Island, that Reagan lost in 1980 but won in 1984.

== Results ==
1984 United States presidential election in Maryland
Party	Candidate	Votes	Percentage	Electoral votes
Republican	Ronald Reagan (Incumbent)	879,918	52.51%	10
Democratic	Walter Mondale	787,935	47.02%	0
Libertarian	David Bergland	5,721	0.34%	0
Communist	Gus Hall	898	0.05%	0
Workers World	Larry Holmes	745	0.04%	0
New Alliance	Dennis L. Serrette	656	0.04%	0
Totals		1,675,873	100.0%	10

=== Results by county ===
County	Ronald Reagan Republican		Walter Mondale Democratic		Various candidates Other parties		Margin		Total votes cast
County	#	%	#	%	#	%	#	%	Total votes cast
Allegany	19,763	63.30%	11,143	35.69%	317	1.02%	8,620	27.61%	31,223
Anne Arundel	94,171	66.04%	47,565	33.36%	855	0.60%	46,606	32.68%	142,591
Baltimore	171,929	61.31%	106,908	38.12%	1,591	0.57%	65,021	23.19%	280,428
Baltimore City	80,120	28.20%	202,277	71.18%	1,766	0.62%	-122,157	-42.98%	284,163
Calvert	8,303	59.99%	5,455	39.41%	82	0.59%	2,848	20.58%	13,840
Caroline	4,876	68.69%	2,198	30.96%	25	0.35%	2,678	37.73%	7,099
Carroll	27,230	75.22%	8,898	24.58%	71	0.20%	18,332	50.64%	36,199
Cecil	13,111	65.93%	6,681	33.60%	93	0.47%	6,430	32.33%	19,885
Charles	16,132	60.97%	10,264	38.79%	64	0.24%	5,868	22.18%	26,460
Dorchester	6,699	67.12%	3,160	31.66%	122	1.22%	3,539	35.46%	9,981
Frederick	29,606	68.67%	13,411	31.11%	96	0.22%	16,195	37.56%	43,113
Garrett	7,042	74.31%	2,386	25.18%	49	0.52%	4,656	49.13%	9,477
Harford	37,382	68.41%	17,133	31.36%	127	0.23%	20,249	37.05%	54,642
Howard	35,641	57.78%	25,713	41.68%	334	0.54%	9,928	16.10%	61,688
Kent	3,897	61.63%	2,390	37.80%	36	0.57%	1,507	23.83%	6,323
Montgomery	146,924	50.00%	146,036	49.69%	910	0.31%	888	0.31%	293,870
Prince George's	95,121	40.96%	136,063	58.59%	1,036	0.45%	-40,942	-17.63%	232,220
Queen Anne's	6,784	69.49%	2,938	30.09%	41	0.42%	3,846	39.40%	9,763
Somerset	4,508	64.68%	2,439	34.99%	23	0.33%	2,069	29.69%	6,970
St. Mary's	11,201	63.39%	6,420	36.33%	49	0.28%	4,781	27.06%	17,670
Talbot	8,028	71.32%	3,198	28.41%	30	0.27%	4,830	42.91%	11,256
Washington	27,118	66.68%	13,329	32.78%	219	0.54%	13,789	33.90%	40,666
Wicomico	16,124	66.27%	8,160	33.54%	48	0.20%	7,964	32.73%	24,332
Worcester	8,208	68.32%	3,770	31.38%	36	0.30%	4,438	36.94%	12,014
Totals	879,918	52.51%	787,935	47.02%	8,020	0.48%	91,983	5.49%	1,675,873

==== Counties that flipped from Democratic to Republican ====
- Kent
- Somerset

== See also ==
- United States presidential elections in Maryland
- 1984 United States presidential election
- 1984 United States elections
