= 1840 United States presidential election in Maryland =

- November 9, 1840
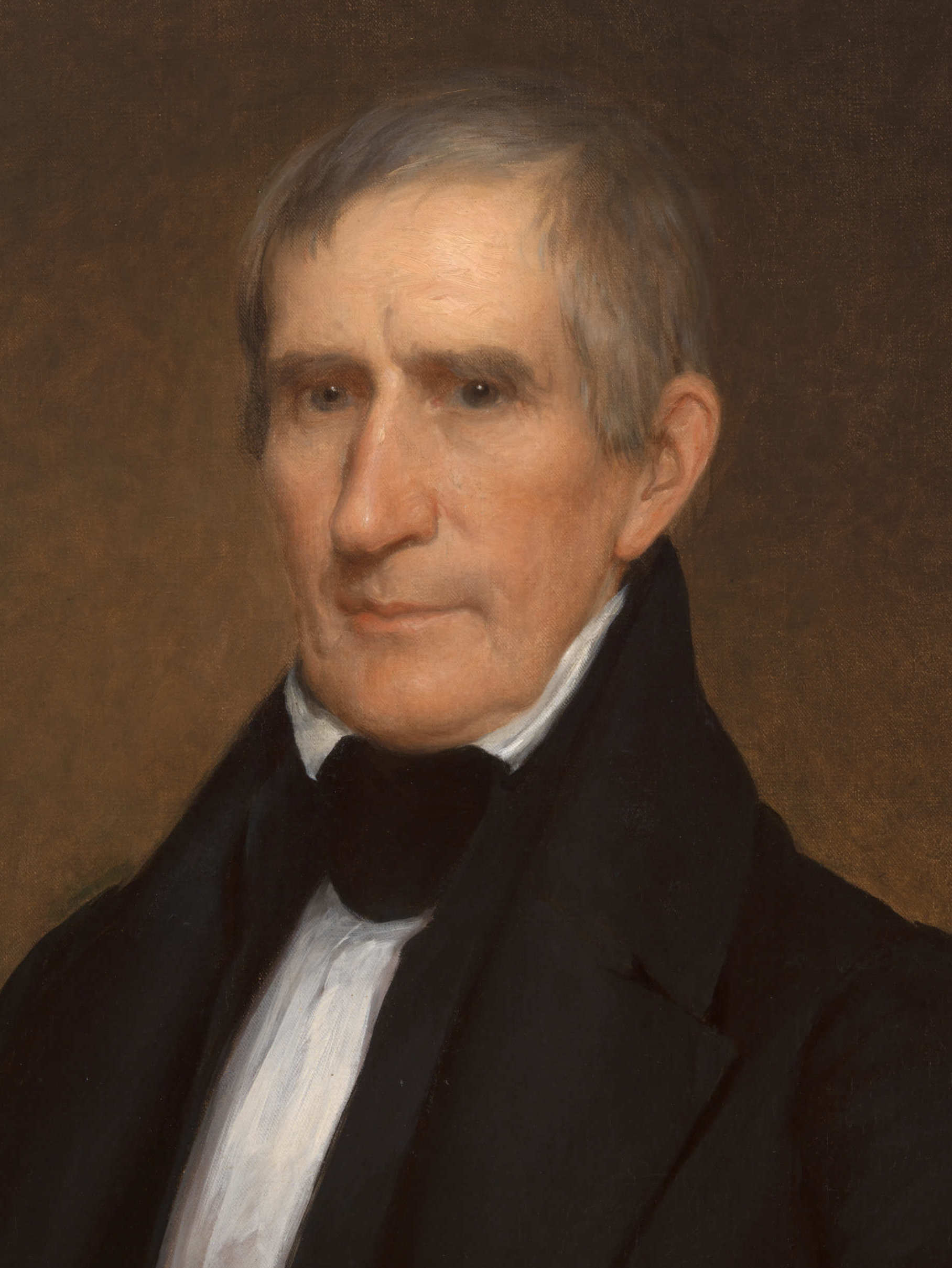

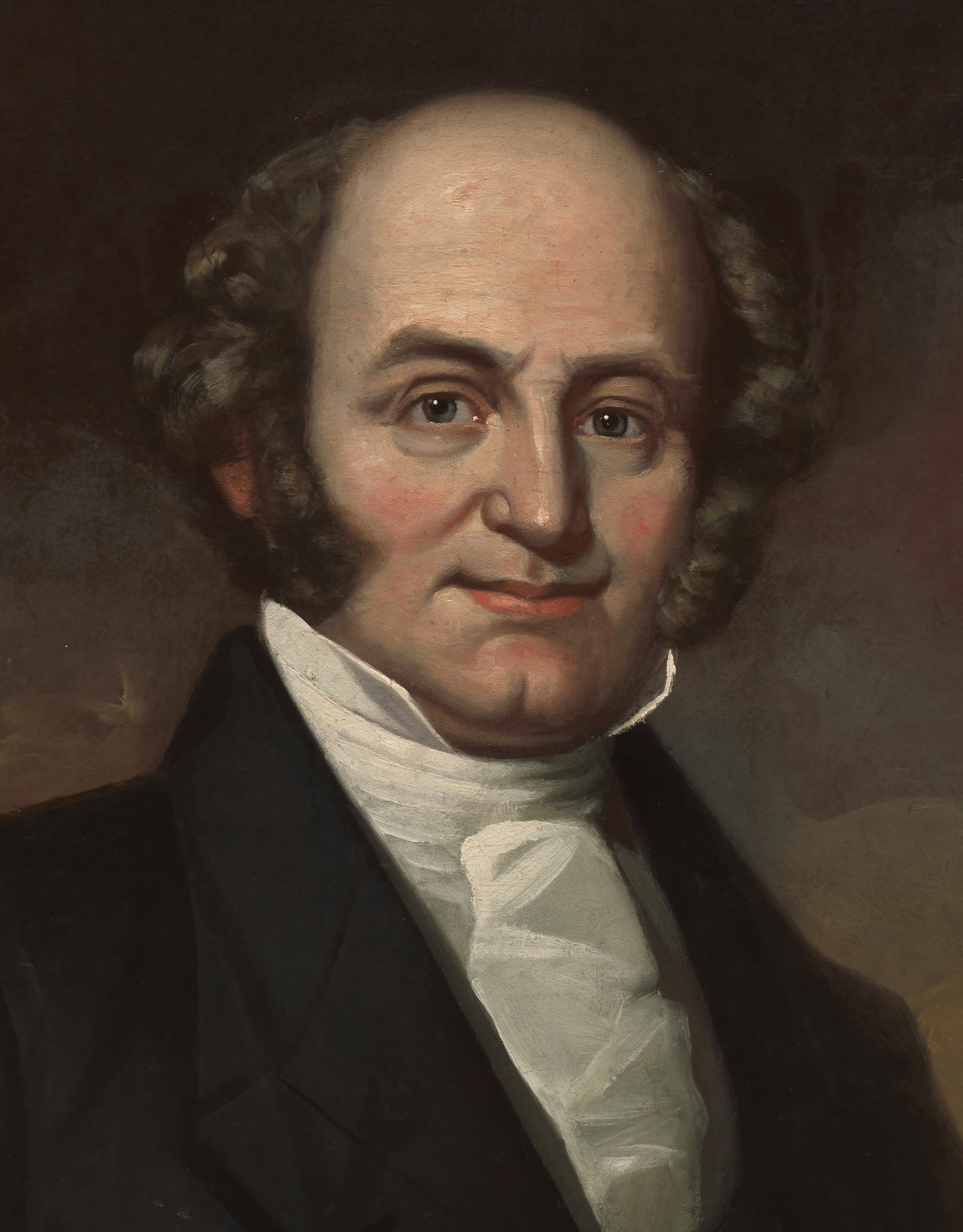
Nominee	William Henry Harrison	Martin Van Buren
Party	Whig	Democratic
Home state	Ohio	New York
Running mate	John Tyler	none
Electoral vote	10	0
Popular vote	33,528	28,752
Percentage	53.83%	46.17%
County results
Harrison
50–60%
60–70%
Van Buren
50–60%
President before election
Martin Van Buren
Democratic
Elected President
William Henry Harrison
Whig

The 1840 United States presidential election in Maryland was held on November 9, 1840 as part of the 1840 United States presidential election. Voters chose 10 representatives, or electors to the Electoral College, who voted for President and Vice President.

Maryland voted for the Whig candidate, William Henry Harrison, over Democratic candidate Martin Van Buren, by a margin of 7.66%. As of 2020, this remains the only time in history that an incumbent Democratic president who served a full term has failed to carry any of Maryland's electoral votes in a reelection bid.

This was the first presidential election that Carroll County was able to vote in.

== Results ==
1840 United States presidential election in Maryland
Party	Candidate	Running mate	Popular vote		Electoral vote	
Party	Candidate	Running mate	Count	%	Count	%
Whig	William Henry Harrison of Ohio	John Tyler of Virginia	33,528	53.83%	10	100.00%
Democratic	Martin Van Buren of New York	Richard Mentor Johnson of Kentucky	28,752	46.17%	0	0.00%
Total			62,280	100.00%	10	100.00%

=== Results by county ===
County	William Henry Harrison Whig		Martin Van Buren Democratic		Margin		Total votes cast
County	#	%	#	%	#	%	Total votes cast
Allegany	1271	53.76%	1093	46.24%	178	7.53%	2364
Anne Arundel	1604	53.68%	1384	46.32%	220	7.36%	2988
Baltimore (City and County)	9237	48.15%	9946	51.85%	-709	-3.70%	19183
Calvert	494	60.32%	325	39.68%	169	20.64%	819
Caroline	687	56.22%	535	43.78%	152	12.44%	1222
Carroll	1554	49.12%	1610	50.88%	-56	-1.77%	3164
Cecil	1448	52.43%	1314	47.57%	134	4.85%	3164
Charles	841	62.62%	502	37.38%	339	25.24%	1343
Dorchester	1381	62.21%	839	37.79%	542	24.41%	2220
Frederick	2958	53.00%	2623	47.00%	335	6.00%	5581
Harford	1342	51.81%	1248	48.19%	94	3.62%	2590
Kent	679	58.79%	476	41.21%	203	17.58%	1155
Montgomery	1099	62.30%	665	37.70%	434	24.60%	1764
Prince George's	1017	62.55%	609	37.45%	408	25.09%	1626
Queen Anne's	778	54.07%	661	45.93%	117	8.13%	1439
St. Mary's	895	68.32%	415	31.68%	480	36.64%	1310
Somerset	1516	64.24%	844	35.76%	672	28.47%	2360
Talbot	749	52.34%	682	47.66%	67	4.68%	1431
Washington	2484	52.03%	2290	47.97%	194	4.06%	4774
Worcester	1494	68.38%	691	31.62%	803	36.75%	2185
Total	33,528	53.83%	28,752	46.17%	4,776	7.66%	62,280

==== Counties that flipped from Democratic to Whig ====
- Cecil

== See also ==
- United States presidential elections in Maryland
- 1840 United States presidential election
- 1840 United States elections
