= 1944 United States presidential election in Maryland =

- November 7, 1944

All 8 Maryland votes to the Electoral College

Nominee	Franklin D. Roosevelt	Thomas E. Dewey
Party	Democratic	Republican
Home state	New York	New York
Running mate	Harry S. Truman	John W. Bricker
Electoral vote	8	0
Popular vote	315,490	292,949
Percentage	51.85%	48.15%
County results
Roosevelt
50–60%
Dewey
50–60%
60–70%
President before election
Franklin D. Roosevelt
Democratic
Elected President
Franklin D. Roosevelt
Democratic

The 1944 United States presidential election in Maryland took place on November 7, 1944, as part of the 1944 United States presidential election. State voters chose eight representatives, or electors, to the Electoral College, who voted for president and vice president.

Maryland was won by incumbent President Franklin D. Roosevelt (D–New York), running with Senator Harry S. Truman, with 51.85% of the popular vote, against Governor Thomas E. Dewey (R–New York), running with Governor John Bricker, with 48.15% of the popular vote.

In this election, Maryland voted 3.79% to the right of the nation at-large.

== Results ==
1944 United States presidential election in Maryland
Party	Candidate	Votes	%
Democratic	Franklin D. Roosevelt (inc.)	315,490	51.85%
Republican	Thomas E. Dewey	292,949	48.15%
Total votes		608,439	100%

=== Results by county ===
County	Franklin Delano Roosevelt Democratic		Thomas Edmund Dewey Republican		Margin		Total votes cast
County	#	%	#	%	#	%	Total votes cast
Allegany	15,345	49.61%	15,589	50.39%	-244	-0.79%	30,934
Anne Arundel	10,269	48.60%	10,860	51.40%	-591	-2.80%	21,129
Baltimore	26,275	43.56%	34,047	56.44%	-7,772	-12.88%	60,322
Baltimore City	163,493	59.17%	112,817	40.83%	50,676	18.34%	276,310
Calvert	1,549	41.49%	2,184	58.51%	-635	-17.01%	3,733
Caroline	2,060	40.13%	3,073	59.87%	-1,013	-19.74%	5,133
Carroll	4,483	33.25%	8,999	66.75%	-4,516	-33.50%	13,482
Cecil	4,662	55.89%	3,680	44.11%	982	11.77%	8,342
Charles	1,875	40.50%	2,755	59.50%	-880	-19.01%	4,630
Dorchester	4,764	52.90%	4,241	47.10%	523	5.81%	9,005
Frederick	8,528	42.87%	11,367	57.13%	-2,839	-14.27%	19,895
Garrett	1,961	32.03%	4,162	67.97%	-2,201	-35.95%	6,123
Harford	4,839	41.75%	6,751	58.25%	-1,912	-16.50%	11,590
Howard	3,140	48.43%	3,344	51.57%	-204	-3.15%	6,484
Kent	2,454	51.07%	2,351	48.93%	103	2.14%	4,805
Montgomery	15,324	42.90%	20,400	57.10%	-5,076	-14.21%	35,724
Prince George's	14,006	50.46%	13,750	49.54%	256	0.92%	27,756
Queen Anne's	3,027	58.82%	2,119	41.18%	908	17.64%	5,146
Somerset	3,125	45.19%	3,790	54.81%	-665	-9.62%	6,915
St. Mary's	1,891	41.43%	2,673	58.57%	-782	-17.13%	4,564
Talbot	2,768	42.72%	3,712	57.28%	-944	-14.57%	6,480
Washington	11,365	48.17%	12,227	51.83%	-862	-3.65%	23,592
Wicomico	5,674	52.96%	5,040	47.04%	634	5.92%	10,714
Worcester	2,613	46.40%	3,018	53.60%	-405	-7.19%	5,631
Totals	315,490	51.85%	292,949	48.15%	22,541	3.70%	608,439

==== Counties that flipped from Democratic to Republican ====
- Allegany
- Anne Arundel
- Baltimore (County)
- Calvert
- Caroline
- Frederick
- Howard
- Montgomery
- Somerset
- St. Mary's
- Washington
- Worcester

== See also ==
- United States presidential elections in Maryland
- 1944 United States presidential election
- 1944 United States elections
