= 2024 United States presidential election in Maryland =

- November 5, 2024
- Turnout: 72.84% (▼1.79 pp)

Nominee	Kamala Harris	Donald Trump
Party	Democratic	Republican
Home state	California	Florida
Running mate	Tim Walz	JD Vance
Electoral vote	10	0
Popular vote	1,902,577	1,035,550
Percentage	62.62%	34.08%

Harris
40–50%
50–60%
60–70%
70–80%
80–90%
90–100%
Trump
40–50%
50–60%
60–70%
70–80%
80–90%
90–100%
No data
President before election
Joe Biden
Democratic
Elected President
Donald Trump
Republican

The 2024 United States presidential election in Maryland took place on Tuesday, November 5, 2024, as part of the 2024 United States elections in which all 50 states plus the District of Columbia participated. Maryland voters chose electors to represent them in the Electoral College via a popular vote. The state of Maryland has 10 electoral votes in the Electoral College, following reapportionment due to the 2020 United States census in which the state neither gained nor lost a seat.

Due to the progressive influence of the Baltimore-Washington metropolitan area—home to the majority of Maryland's population and most of Maryland's significant African American population—Democrats have consistently won Maryland's electoral votes by double-digit margins since 1992. While relatively rural regions like Western Maryland and the Eastern Shore remain more conservative, their impact is outweighed by the state's urban centers. In 2020, Joe Biden from neighboring Delaware won Maryland by 33 points. Maryland was widely expected to remain a safe blue state in 2024.

Harris comfortably won the state by about 28.5%, but by a margin almost 5 points lower than Joe Biden. Maryland was Harris's second-strongest state, after Vermont. Trump became the first Republican presidential nominee to surpass one million votes in Maryland since George W. Bush in 2004. Larry Hogan, who was concurrently running for the U.S. Senate, ran 17 points ahead of Trump.

Trump became the first Republican to win the White House without winning Frederick County since Abraham Lincoln in 1860, and Harris the first unsuccessful Democrat to ever win the county.

Only one county, Garrett County, shifted towards Harris from 2020. Maryland also had the closest county in the nation, Talbot County, which was decided by just 6 votes.

With 1.1% of the total vote share, Maryland was Green Party candidate Jill Stein's best state.

== Primary elections ==
=== Democratic primary ===
The Maryland Democratic primary was held on May 14, 2024, alongside primaries in Nebraska and West Virginia.

Maryland Democratic primary, May 14, 2024
Candidate	Votes	%	Delegates
Joe Biden (incumbent)	591,523	87.14	95
Marianne Williamson	12,935	1.91	0
Dean Phillips (withdrawn)	8,188	1.21	0
Uncommitted	66,168	9.75	0
Total	678,814	100%	95

=== Republican primary ===
The Maryland Republican primary was held on May 14, 2024, alongside primaries in Nebraska and West Virginia.

Maryland Republican primary, May 14, 2024
Candidate	Votes	Percentage	Actual delegate count		
Candidate	Votes	Percentage	Bound	Unbound	Total
Donald Trump	205,996	77.7%	37	0	37
Nikki Haley (withdrawn)	56,506	21.3%	0	0	0
Uncommitted	2,607	1.0%	0	0	0
Total:	265,109	100.0%	37	0	37

== General election ==
=== Predictions ===
Source	Ranking	As of
Cook Political Report	Solid D	December 19, 2023
Inside Elections	Solid D	April 26, 2023
Sabato's Crystal Ball	Safe D	June 29, 2023
Decision Desk HQ/The Hill	Safe D	December 14, 2023
CNalysis	Solid D	December 30, 2023
CNN	Solid D	January 14, 2024
The Economist	Safe D	June 12, 2024
538	Solid D	June 11, 2024
RCP	Solid D	June 26, 2024
NBC News	Safe D	October 6, 2024

=== Polling ===
Kamala Harris vs. Donald Trump

Poll source	Date(s) administered	Sample size (Note: Key: A – all adults RV – registered voters LV – likely voters V – unclear)	Margin of error	Kamala Harris Democratic	Donald Trump Republican	Other / Undecided
Morning Consult	October 22–31, 2024	490 (LV)	± 5.0%	64%	31%	5%
ActiVote	October 6–30, 2024	400 (LV)	± 4.9%	64%	37%	–
Braun Research (Note: Poll sponsored by The Washington Post and the University of Maryland, College Park)	October 17–22, 2024	1,000 (LV)	± 3.6%	61%	33%	7% (Note: "No opinion/Skipped" with 4%; "Would not vote" with 1%; "Someone else" with 2%)
Braun Research	October 17–22, 2024	1,000 (RV)	± 3.6%	59%	34%	7% (Note: "No opinion/Skipped" with 4%; "Would not vote" with 1%; "Someone else" with 2%)
Emerson College	October 19–21, 2024	865 (LV)	± 3.2%	64%	34%	2%
Emerson College	October 19–21, 2024	865 (LV)	± 3.2%	63%	33%	4% (Note: "Someone else" with 2%; "Undecided" with 2%)
Morning Consult	October 10–15, 2024	490 (LV)	± 4.0%	64%	31%	4%
ActiVote	September 8 – October 14, 2024	400 (LV)	± 4.9%	63%	37%	–
Braun Research	September 19–23, 2024	1,012 (LV)	± 3.5%	64%	32%	5% (Note: "No opinion/Skipped" with 4%; "Would not vote" with 1%; "Other" with <0.5%)
Braun Research	September 19–23, 2024	1,012 (RV)	± 3.5%	62%	32%	6% (Note: "No opinion/Skipped" with 5%; "Would not vote" with 1%; "Other" with <0.5%)
Morning Consult	September 9–18, 2024	516 (LV)	± 4.0%	61%	33%	6%
Public Policy Polling (D)	September 16–17, 2024	543 (RV)	± 4.2%	64%	33%	3%
Emerson College	September 12–13, 2024	890 (LV)	± 3.2%	65%	33%	2%
Emerson College	September 12–13, 2024	890 (LV)	± 3.2%	63%	32%	5%
Morning Consult	August 30 – September 8, 2024	516 (LV)	± 4.0%	62%	34%	4%
Gonzales Research	August 24–30, 2024	820 (RV)	± 3.5%	56%	35%	10%
Fabrizio Ward (R)/Impact Research (D) (Note: Poll commissioned by AARP)	August 14–20, 2024	700 (LV)	± 4.0%	64%	32%	4%

Kamala Harris vs. Donald Trump vs. Robert F. Kennedy Jr. vs. Jill Stein vs. Chase Oliver

Poll source	Date(s) administered	Sample size	Margin of error	Kamala Harris Democratic	Donald Trump Republican	Robert F. Kennedy Jr. Independent	Chase Oliver Libertarian	Jill Stein Green	Undecided
Chism Strategies	October 28–30, 2024	510 (LV)	± 4.34%	56%	33%	0%	0%	1%	10% (Note: "Someone else" with 4%)
YouGov (Note: Poll sponsored by the University of Maryland, College Park.)	October 23–27, 2024	500 (LV)	± 5.2%	61%	34%	–	0%	2%	5%
University of Maryland, Baltimore County	September 23–28, 2024	863 (LV)	± 3.3%	57%	35%	2%	0%	1%	5% (Note: "Some other candidate" with 2%)
Braun Research	September 19–23, 2024	1,012 (LV)	± 3.5%	63%	31%	–	1%	1%	5% (Note: "No opinion/Skipped" with 4%; "Would not vote" with 1%; "Other" with <0.5%)
Braun Research	September 19–23, 2024	1,012 (RV)	± 3.5%	61%	31%	–	1%	1%	6% (Note: "No opinion/Skipped" with 5%; "Would not vote" with 1%; "Other" with <0.5%)
Fabrizio Ward (R)/Impact Research (D)	August 14–20, 2024	700 (LV)	± 4.0%	59%	29%	5%	1%	1%	5%

Hypothetical polling

Joe Biden vs. Donald Trump

Poll source	Date(s) administered	Sample size	Margin of error	Joe Biden Democratic	Donald Trump Republican	Other / Undecided
Public Policy Polling (D)	June 19–20, 2024	635 (V)	± 3.9%	56%	30%	15%
Emerson College	May 6–8, 2024	1,115 (RV)	± 2.9%	56%	35%	9%
Public Policy Polling (D) (Note: This poll was commissioned by EMILY's List, which supports Biden.)	May 6–7, 2024	719 (V)	± 3.7%	60%	32%	8%
Emerson College	February 12–13, 2024	1,000 (RV)	± 3.0%	55%	32%	13%
Gonzales Research	January 23 – February 2, 2024	815 (RV)	± 3.5%	53%	32%	15%
Gonzales Research	September 18–28, 2023	818 (LV)	± 3.5%	56%	30%	13%
Gonzales Research	May 30 – June 6, 2023	841 (RV)	± 3.5%	52%	35%	13%

Joe Biden vs. Donald Trump vs. Robert F. Kennedy Jr. vs. Cornel West vs. Jill Stein

Poll source	Date(s) administered	Sample size	Margin of error	Joe Biden Democratic	Donald Trump Republican	Robert F. Kennedy Jr. Independent	Cornel West Independent	Jill Stein Green	Other / Undecided
Emerson College	May 6–8, 2024	1,115 (RV)	± 2.9%	50%	33%	6%	4%	1%	6%
Emerson College	February 12−13, 2024	1,000 (RV)	± 3.0%	47%	32%	6%	1%	1%	13%

Joe Biden vs. Donald Trump vs. Robert F. Kennedy Jr.

Poll source	Date(s) administered	Sample size	Margin of error	Joe Biden Democratic	Donald Trump Republican	Robert F. Kennedy Jr. Independent	Other / Undecided
Gonzales Research	January 23 – February 2, 2024	815 (RV)	± 3.5%	45%	28%	18%	9%

Joe Biden vs. Nikki Haley

Poll source	Date(s) administered	Sample size	Margin of error	Joe Biden Democratic	Nikki Haley Republican	Other / Undecided
Gonzales Research	January 23 – February 2, 2024	815 (RV)	± 3.5%	50%	36%	14%
Gonzales Research	September 18–28, 2023	818 (LV)	± 3.5%	53%	36%	11%

Joe Biden vs. Ron DeSantis

Poll source	Date(s) administered	Sample size	Margin of error	Joe Biden Democratic	Ron DeSantis Republican	Other / Undecided
Gonzales Research	September 18–28, 2023	818 (LV)	± 3.5%	56%	35%	9%
Gonzales Research	May 30 – June 6, 2023	841 (RV)	± 3.5%	51%	37%	12%

Joe Biden vs. Vivek Ramaswamy

Poll source	Date(s) administered	Sample size	Margin of error	Joe Biden Democratic	Vivek Ramaswamy Republican	Other / Undecided
Gonzales Research	September 18–28, 2023	818 (LV)	± 3.5%	56%	29%	15%

=== Results ===
Legislative district results

2024 United States presidential election in Maryland
Party	Candidate	Votes	%	±%
Democratic	Kamala Harris; Tim Walz	1,902,577	62.62%	−2.74%
Republican	Donald Trump; JD Vance	1,035,550	34.08%	+1.93%
Green	Jill Stein; Butch Ware	33,134	1.09%	+0.57%
Independent	Robert F. Kennedy Jr. (withdrawn); Nicole Shanahan (withdrawn)	28,819	0.95%	N/A
Libertarian	Chase Oliver; Mike ter Maat	15,570	0.51%	−0.59%
Write-in		22,684	0.75%	+0.08%
Total votes		3,038,334	100.00%	

==== By county ====
County	Kamala Harris Democratic		Donald Trump Republican		Various candidates Other parties		Margin		Total
County	#	%	#	%	#	%	#	%	Total
Allegany	9,231	28.72%	22,141	68.90%	765	2.38%	-12,910	-40.18%	32,137
Anne Arundel	171,945	55.19%	128,892	41.37%	10,735	3.45%	43,053	13.82%	311,572
Baltimore	249,958	60.53%	149,560	36.22%	13,397	3.24%	100,398	24.31%	412,915
Baltimore City	195,109	84.55%	27,984	12.13%	7,661	3.32%	167,125	72.42%	230,754
Calvert	23,438	43.25%	29,361	54.18%	1,392	2.57%	-5,923	-10.93%	54,191
Caroline	4,860	29.76%	11,053	67.69%	417	2.55%	-6,193	-37.93%	16,330
Carroll	36,867	35.91%	62,273	60.66%	3,511	3.42%	-25,406	-24.75%	102,651
Cecil	17,628	33.37%	33,871	64.11%	1,332	2.52%	-16,243	-30.74%	52,831
Charles	63,454	68.90%	26,145	28.39%	2,498	2.71%	37,309	40.51%	92,097
Dorchester	6,954	41.46%	9,390	55.99%	428	2.55%	-2,436	-14.53%	16,772
Frederick	82,409	52.79%	68,753	44.04%	4,952	3.17%	13,656	8.75%	156,114
Garrett	3,456	21.82%	11,983	75.66%	399	2.52%	-8,527	-53.84%	15,838
Harford	62,453	41.61%	83,050	55.33%	4,587	3.06%	-20,597	-13.72%	150,090
Howard	124,764	68.44%	49,425	27.11%	8,102	4.44%	75,339	41.33%	182,291
Kent	5,251	47.19%	5,561	49.97%	316	2.84%	-310	-2.78%	11,128
Montgomery	386,581	74.45%	112,637	21.69%	20,003	3.85%	273,944	52.76%	519,221
Prince George's	347,038	85.90%	45,008	11.14%	11,963	2.96%	302,030	74.76%	404,009
Queen Anne's	11,273	34.85%	20,200	62.45%	874	2.70%	-8,927	-27.60%	32,347
St. Mary's	23,531	39.91%	33,582	56.96%	1,841	3.12%	-10,051	-17.05%	58,954
Somerset	4,054	39.99%	5,805	57.27%	278	2.74%	-1,751	-17.28%	10,137
Talbot	11,119	48.70%	11,125	48.73%	586	2.57%	-6	-0.03%	22,830
Washington	27,260	37.17%	44,054	60.07%	2,018	2.75%	-16,794	-22.90%	73,332
Wicomico	21,513	45.86%	24,065	51.30%	1,334	2.84%	-2,552	-5.44%	46,912
Worcester	12,431	37.81%	19,632	59.71%	818	2.49%	-7,201	-21.90%	32,881
Totals	1,902,577	62.62%	1,035,550	34.08%	100,207	3.30%	867,027	28.54%	3,038,334

Counties that flipped from Democratic to Republican

- Kent (county seat and largest municipality: Chestertown)
- Talbot (county seat and largest municipality: Easton)

==== By congressional district ====
Harris won seven of eight congressional districts.

District	Harris	Trump	Representative
1st	40.17%	56.99%	Andy Harris
2nd	57.48%	39.17%	Dutch Ruppersberger (118th Congress)
2nd	57.48%	39.17%	Johnny Olszewski (119th Congress)
3rd	59.84%	36.30%	John Sarbanes (118th Congress)
3rd	59.84%	36.30%	Sarah Elfreth (119th Congress)
4th	85.00%	11.77%	Glenn Ivey
5th	65.11%	32.03%	Steny Hoyer
6th	51.25%	45.51%	David Trone (118th Congress)
6th	51.25%	45.51%	April McClain Delaney (119th Congress)
7th	77.68%	19.12%	Kweisi Mfume
8th	76.01%	20.17%	Jamie Raskin

== See also ==
- 2024 Maryland elections
- United States presidential elections in Maryland
- 2024 United States presidential election
- 2024 Democratic Party presidential primaries
- 2024 Republican Party presidential primaries
- 2024 United States elections

== Notes ==
Partisan clients
