= 1860 United States presidential election in Maryland =

- November 6, 1860
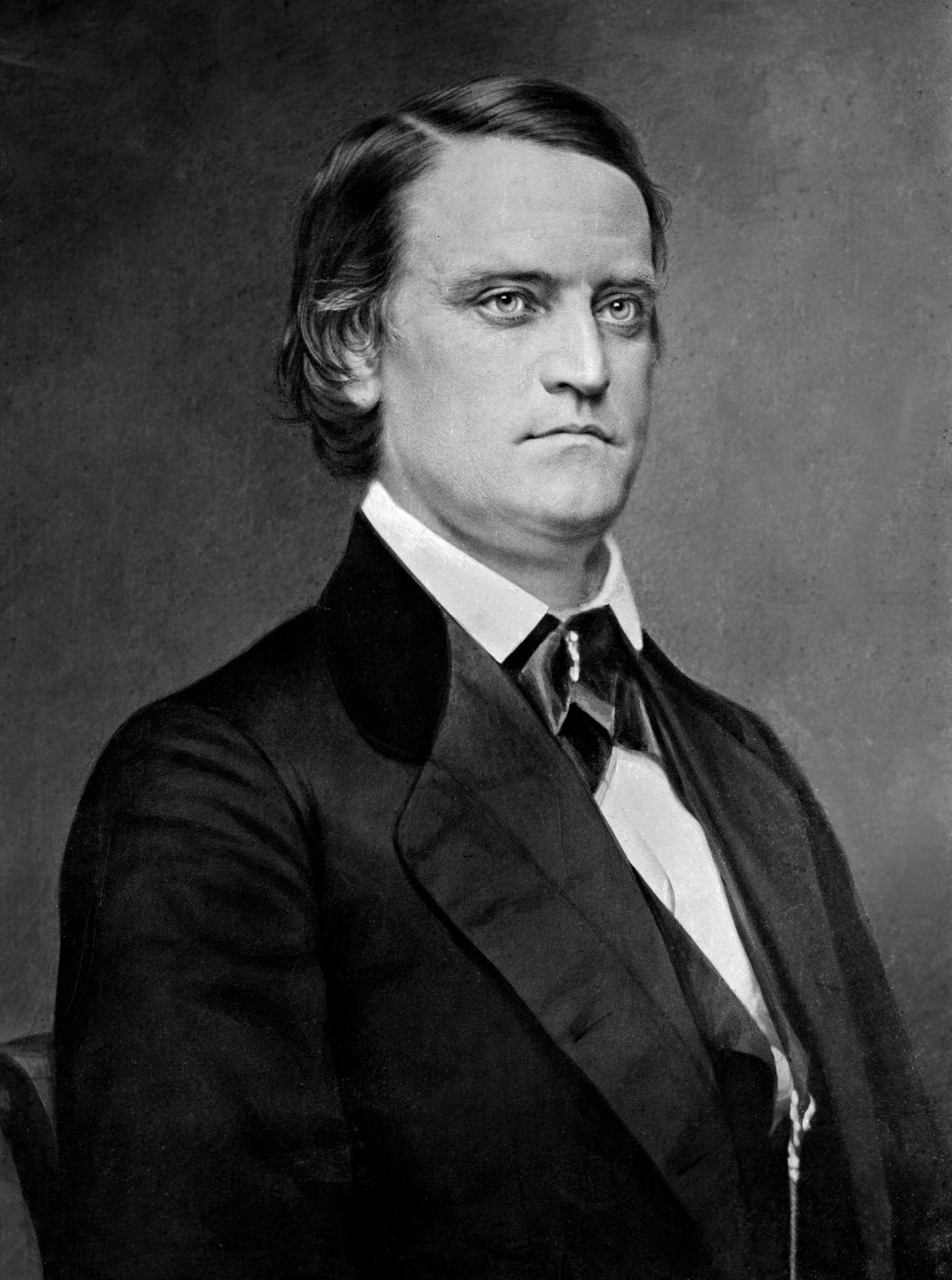

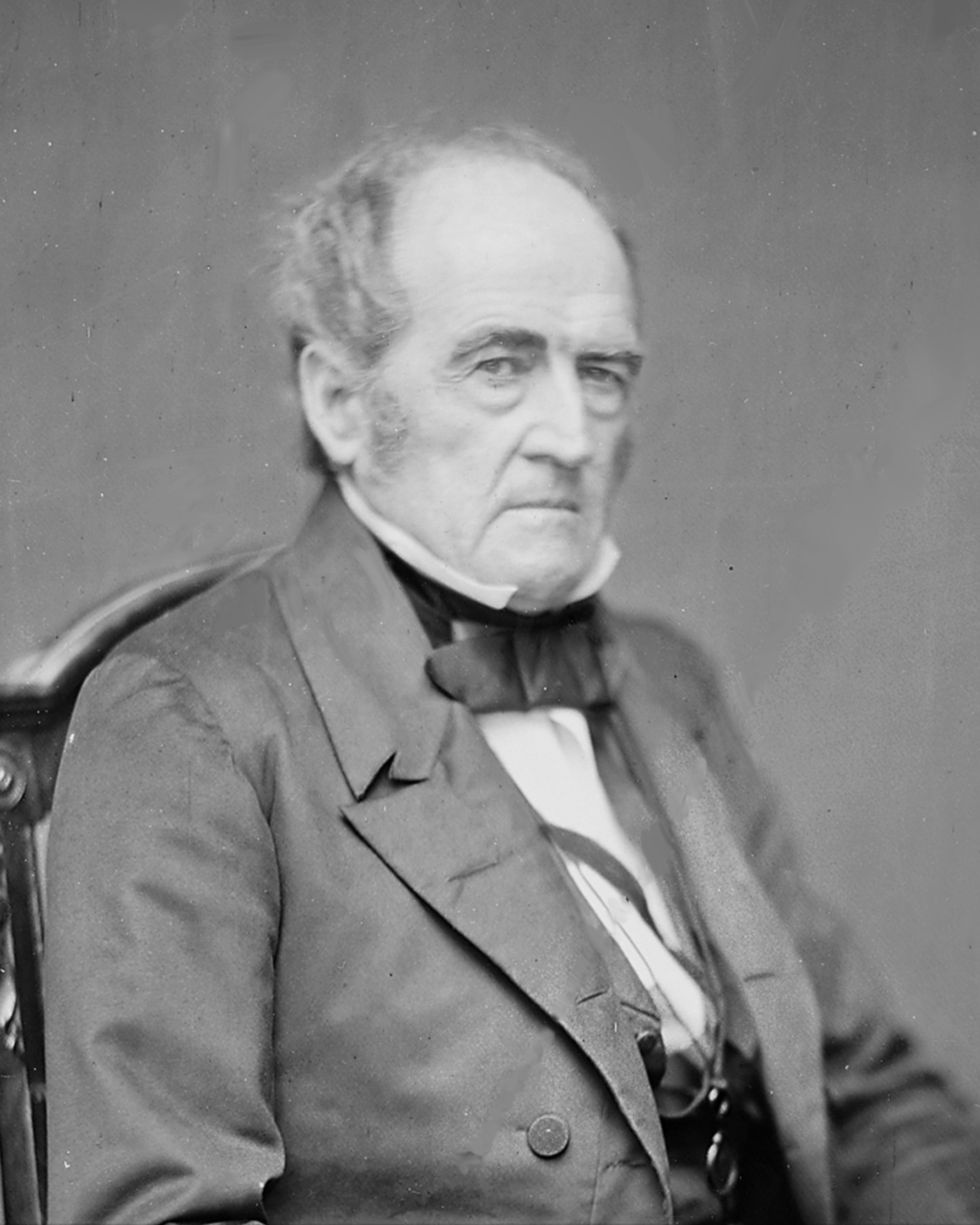

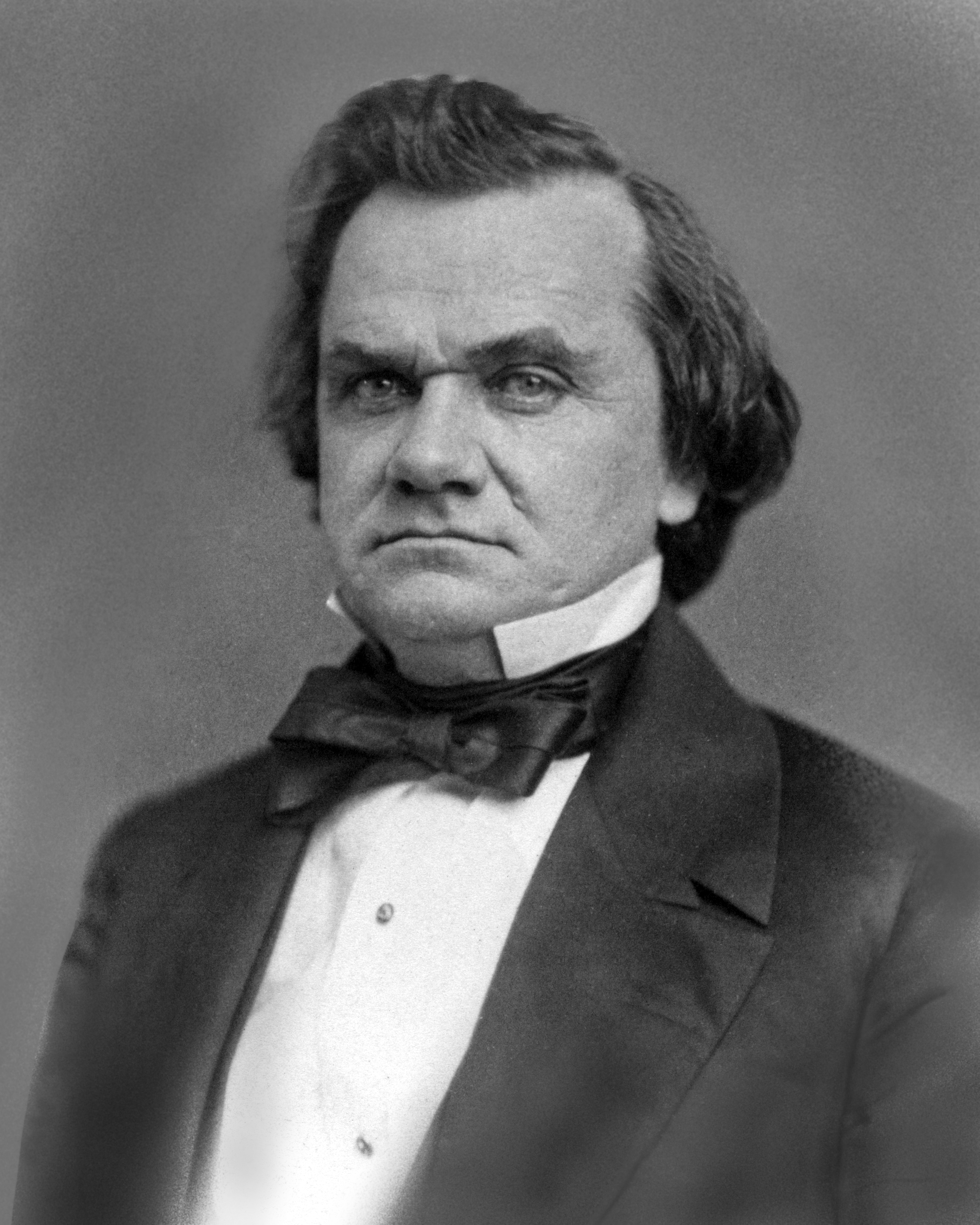
| Nominee | John Breckinridge | John Bell | Stephen A. Douglas |
| Party | Southern Democratic | Constitutional Union | Democratic |
| Home state | Kentucky | Tennessee | Illinois |
| Running mate | Joseph Lane | Edward Everett | Herschel V. Johnson |
| Electoral vote | 8 | 0 | 0 |
| Popular vote | 42,482 | 41,760 | 5,966 |
| Percentage | 45.93% | 45.14% | 6.45% |
County results
Breckenridge
40–50%
50–60%
60–70%
Bell
40–50%
50–60%
President before election
James Buchanan
Democratic
Elected President
Abraham Lincoln
Republican

The 1860 United States presidential election in Maryland took place on November 6, 1860, as part of the 1860 United States presidential election. Maryland voters chose eight representatives, or electors, to the Electoral College, who voted for president and vice president.

Maryland was won by the Southern Democratic candidate 14th Vice President of the United States John C. Breckinridge of Kentucky and his running mate Senator Joseph Lane of Oregon. They defeated the Constitutional Union candidate Senator John Bell of Tennessee and his running mate the 15th Governor of Massachusetts Edward Everett as well as Democratic candidate Senator Stephen A. Douglas of Illinois and his running mate 41st Governor of Georgia Herschel V. Johnson. Breckinridge won the state by a narrow margin of 0.79%.

Despite coming in a distant fourth place with 2,294 votes Abraham Lincoln did receive over 2,000 more votes than John C. Frémont received in 1856 and would later win the state in 1864 with 55% of the vote.

== Results ==
1860 United States presidential election in Maryland
| Party | Candidate | Votes | % |
|---|---|---|---|
| Southern Democratic | John C. Breckinridge | 42,482 | 45.93% |
| Constitutional Union | John Bell | 41,760 | 45.14% |
| Democratic | Stephen A. Douglas | 5,966 | 6.45% |
| Republican | Abraham Lincoln | 2,294 | 2.48% |
| Total votes | | 92,502 | 100% |

=== Results by county ===
| County | John C. Breckinridge Southern Democratic | | John Bell Constitutional Union | | Stephen A. Douglas Democratic | | Abraham Lincoln Republican | | Margin | | Total votes cast |
| County | # | % | # | % | # | % | # | % | # | % | Total votes cast |
|---|---|---|---|---|---|---|---|---|---|---|---|
| Allegany | 979 | 23.17% | 1,521 | 36.00% | 1,203 | 28.47% | 522 | 12.36% | -318 | -7.53% | 4,225 |
| Anne Arundel | 1,017 | 47.11% | 1,041 | 48.22% | 98 | 4.54% | 3 | 0.14% | -24 | -1.11% | 2,159 |
| Baltimore (City) | 14,956 | 49.61% | 12,604 | 41.81% | 1,503 | 4.99% | 1,083 | 3.59% | 2,352 | 7.80% | 30,146 |
| Baltimore (County) | 3,305 | 46.04% | 3,388 | 47.19% | 449 | 6.25% | 37 | 0.52% | -83 | -1.15% | 7,179 |
| Calvert | 386 | 46.56% | 399 | 48.13% | 43 | 5.19% | 1 | 0.12% | -13 | -1.57% | 829 |
| Caroline | 616 | 42.75% | 712 | 49.44% | 100 | 6.94% | 12 | 0.83% | -96 | -6.69% | 1,440 |
| Carroll | 1,791 | 39.94% | 2,295 | 51.18% | 339 | 7.56% | 59 | 1.32% | -504 | -11.24% | 4,484 |
| Cecil | 1,506 | 39.13% | 1,792 | 46.56% | 393 | 10.21% | 158 | 4.10% | -286 | -7.43% | 3,849 |
| Charles | 723 | 60.40% | 430 | 35.92% | 38 | 3.17% | 6 | 0.50% | 293 | 24.48% | 1,197 |
| Dorchester | 1,176 | 46.91% | 1,265 | 50.46% | 31 | 1.24% | 35 | 1.40% | -89 | -3.55% | 2,507 |
| Frederick | 3,167 | 43.20% | 3,616 | 49.32% | 445 | 6.07% | 103 | 1.40% | -449 | -6.12% | 7,331 |
| Harford | 1,527 | 42.99% | 1,862 | 52.42% | 82 | 2.31% | 81 | 2.28% | -335 | -9.43% | 3,552 |
| Howard | 530 | 34.19% | 830 | 53.55% | 189 | 12.19% | 1 | 0.06% | -300 | -19.36% | 1,550 |
| Kent | 694 | 41.76% | 852 | 51.26% | 74 | 4.45% | 42 | 2.53% | -158 | -9.50% | 1,662 |
| Montgomery | 1,125 | 46.32% | 1,155 | 47.55% | 99 | 4.08% | 50 | 2.06% | -30 | -1.23% | 2,429 |
| Prince George's | 1,048 | 53.01% | 885 | 44.76% | 43 | 2.18% | 1 | 0.05% | 163 | 8.25% | 1,977 |
| Queen Anne's | 879 | 46.91% | 908 | 48.45% | 87 | 4.64% | 0 | 0.00% | -29 | -1.54% | 1,874 |
| St. Mary's | 920 | 67.06% | 261 | 19.02% | 190 | 13.85% | 1 | 0.07% | 659 | 48.04% | 1,372 |
| Somerset | 1,339 | 45.14% | 1,536 | 51.79% | 89 | 3.00% | 2 | 0.07% | -197 | -6.65% | 2,966 |
| Talbot | 898 | 50.14% | 793 | 44.28% | 98 | 5.47% | 2 | 0.11% | 105 | 5.86% | 1,791 |
| Washington | 2,475 | 45.66% | 2,567 | 47.36% | 283 | 5.22% | 95 | 1.75% | -92 | -1.70% | 5,420 |
| Worcester | 1,425 | 55.60% | 1,048 | 40.89% | 90 | 3.51% | 0 | 0.00% | 377 | 14.71% | 2,563 |
| Totals: | 42,482 | 45.93% | 41,760 | 45.14% | 5,966 | 6.45% | 2,294 | 2.40% | 722 | 0.79% | 92,502 |

==== Counties that flipped from Democratic to Constitutional Union ====
- Alleghany
- Caroline

==== Counties that flipped from Know Nothing to Constitutional Union ====
- Anne Arundel
- Baltimore
- Calvert
- Carroll
- Cecil
- Dorchester
- Frederick
- Harford
- Howard
- Kent
- Montgomery
- Queen Anne's
- Somerset
- Washington

==== Counties that flipped from Know Nothing to Southern Democratic ====
- Baltimore (city)

== See also ==
- United States presidential elections in Maryland
- 1860 United States presidential election
- 1860 United States elections
