= 1928 United States presidential election in Maryland =

- November 6, 1928

Nominee	Herbert Hoover	Al Smith
Party	Republican	Democratic
Home state	California	New York
Running mate	Charles Curtis	Joseph T. Robinson
Electoral vote	8	0
Popular vote	301,479	223,626
Percentage	57.06%	42.33%
County results
Hoover
50–60%
60–70%
70–80%
Smith
50–60%
60–70%
President before election
Calvin Coolidge
Republican
Elected President
Herbert Hoover
Republican

The 1928 United States presidential election in Maryland took place on November 6, 1928, as part of the 1928 United States presidential election. Voters chose eight representatives, or electors to the Electoral College, who voted for president and vice president.

Herbert Hoover would win Maryland by a margin of 14.73 percent against Al Smith. Hoover won all eight of the state's electoral votes as a result. Despite Hoover's landslide win, Maryland voted 2.68% more Democratic than the nation at-large. Hoover became the first ever Republican victor in Tidewater Wicomico and Worcester counties. Maryland would not vote Republican again until 1948.

== Results ==
1928 United States presidential election in Maryland
Party	Candidate	Running mate	Popular vote		Electoral vote	
Party	Candidate	Running mate	Count	%	Count	%
Republican	Herbert Hoover of California	Charles Curtis of Kansas	301,479	57.06%	8	100.00%
Democratic	Al Smith of New York	Joseph Taylor Robinson of Arkansas	223,626	42.33%	0	0.00%
Socialist	Norman Thomas of New York	James Hudson Maurer of Pennsylvania	1,701	0.32%	0	0.00%
Socialist Labor	Verne L. Reynolds of Michigan	Jeremiah D. Crowley of New York	906	0.17%	0	0.00%
Communist	William Z. Foster of Massachusetts	Benjamin Gitlow of New York	636	0.12%	0	0.00%
Total			828,348	100.00%	8	100.00%

=== Results by county ===
County	Herbert Hoover Republican		Al Smith Democratic		Norman Thomas Socialist		Verne L. Reynolds Labor		William Z. Foster Workers’ Party America		Margin		Total votes cast
County	#	%	#	%	#	%	#	%	#	%	#	%	Total votes cast
Allegany	19,443	67.74%	9,026	31.45%	144	0.50%	62	0.22%	28	0.10%	10,417	36.29%	28,703
Anne Arundel	10,145	61.54%	6,259	37.97%	29	0.18%	43	0.26%	10	0.06%	3,886	23.57%	16,486
Baltimore	23,889	60.17%	15,632	39.37%	81	0.20%	77	0.19%	22	0.06%	8,257	20.80%	39,701
Baltimore City	135,182	51.39%	126,106	47.94%	1,093	0.42%	356	0.14%	321	0.12%	9,076	3.45%	263,058
Calvert	2,085	63.92%	1,144	35.07%	22	0.67%	7	0.21%	4	0.12%	941	28.85%	3,262
Caroline	3,270	61.44%	2,030	38.14%	6	0.11%	5	0.09%	11	0.21%	1,240	23.30%	5,322
Carroll	8,644	69.60%	3,731	30.04%	21	0.17%	18	0.14%	5	0.04%	4,913	39.56%	12,419
Cecil	5,706	71.67%	2,201	27.64%	32	0.40%	17	0.21%	6	0.08%	3,505	44.02%	7,962
Charles	2,522	57.44%	1,860	42.36%	4	0.09%	4	0.09%	1	0.02%	662	15.08%	4,391
Dorchester	6,333	74.20%	2,180	25.54%	12	0.14%	7	0.08%	3	0.04%	4,153	48.66%	8,535
Frederick	12,569	62.57%	7,406	36.87%	45	0.22%	36	0.18%	33	0.16%	5,163	25.70%	20,089
Garrett	4,371	78.38%	1,168	20.94%	21	0.38%	8	0.14%	9	0.16%	3,203	57.43%	5,577
Harford	6,479	64.53%	3,506	34.92%	16	0.16%	25	0.25%	14	0.14%	2,973	29.61%	10,040
Howard	3,296	51.36%	3,088	48.12%	4	0.06%	16	0.25%	13	0.20%	208	3.24%	6,417
Kent	2,777	52.82%	2,450	46.60%	8	0.15%	14	0.27%	8	0.15%	327	6.22%	5,257
Montgomery	9,318	57.74%	6,739	41.76%	34	0.21%	25	0.15%	23	0.14%	2,579	15.98%	16,139
Prince George's	9,782	59.06%	6,658	40.20%	43	0.26%	23	0.14%	56	0.34%	3,124	18.86%	16,562
Queen Anne's	2,666	49.47%	2,700	50.10%	1	0.02%	21	0.39%	1	0.02%	-34	-0.63%	5,389
Somerset	5,071	68.57%	2,277	30.79%	16	0.22%	26	0.35%	5	0.07%	2,794	37.78%	7,395
St. Mary's	1,609	34.00%	3,006	63.51%	9	0.19%	65	1.37%	44	0.93%	-1,397	-29.52%	4,733
Talbot	3,990	61.93%	2,432	37.75%	2	0.03%	17	0.26%	2	0.03%	1,558	24.18%	6,443
Washington	12,404	67.78%	5,816	31.78%	46	0.25%	28	0.15%	7	0.04%	6,588	36.00%	18,301
Wicomico	5,923	59.04%	4,095	40.82%	6	0.06%	4	0.04%	5	0.05%	1,828	18.22%	10,033
Worcester	4,005	65.29%	2,116	34.50%	6	0.10%	2	0.03%	5	0.08%	1,889	30.80%	6,134
Total	301,479	57.06%	223,626	42.33%	1,701	0.32%	906	0.17%	636	0.12%	77,853	14.74%	528,348

==== Counties that flipped from Democratic to Republican ====
- Anne Arundel
- Baltimore (County)
- Caroline
- Harford
- Howard
- Kent
- Montgomery
- Talbot
- Wicomico
- Worcester

== See also ==
- United States presidential elections in Maryland
- 1928 United States presidential election
- 1928 United States elections
