= 1960 United States presidential election in Maryland =

- November 8, 1960

Nominee	John F. Kennedy	Richard Nixon
Party	Democratic	Republican
Home state	Massachusetts	California
Running mate	Lyndon B. Johnson	Henry Cabot Lodge Jr.
Electoral vote	9	0
Popular vote	565,811	489,538
Percentage	53.61%	46.39%
County results
Kennedy
50–60%
60–70%
Nixon
50–60%
60–70%
President before election
Dwight D. Eisenhower
Republican
Elected President
John F. Kennedy
Democratic

The 1960 United States presidential election in Maryland took place on November 8, 1960, as part of the 1960 United States presidential election. State voters chose nine representatives, or electors, to the Electoral College, who voted for president and vice president.

Maryland was won by Senator John F. Kennedy (D–Massachusetts), running with Senator Lyndon B. Johnson, with 53.61% of the popular vote against incumbent Vice President Richard Nixon (R–California), running with former United States Ambassador to the United Nations Henry Cabot Lodge Jr., with 46.39% of the popular vote.

== Results ==
1960 United States presidential election in Maryland
Party	Candidate	Votes	%
Democratic	John F. Kennedy	565,808	53.61%
Republican	Richard Nixon	489,538	46.39%
Write-in		3	0.00%
Total votes		1,055,349	100%

=== Results by county ===
County	John F. Kennedy Democratic		Richard Nixon Republican		Margin		Total votes cast
County	#	%	#	%	#	%	Total votes cast
Allegany	13,701	40.07%	20,489	59.93%	-6,788	-19.86%	34,190
Anne Arundel	26,063	46.00%	30,595	54.00%	-4,532	-8.00%	56,658
Baltimore	94,396	49.57%	96,027	50.43%	-1,631	-0.86%	190,423
Baltimore City	202,752	63.87%	114,705	36.13%	88,047	27.74%	317,457
Calvert	2,535	53.84%	2,173	46.16%	362	7.68%	4,708
Caroline	3,381	47.76%	3,698	52.24%	-317	-4.48%	7,079
Carroll	5,763	33.49%	11,445	66.51%	-5,682	-33.02%	17,208
Cecil	6,065	45.15%	7,368	54.85%	-1,303	-9.70%	13,433
Charles	5,482	54.59%	4,560	45.41%	922	9.18%	10,042
Dorchester	4,964	51.76%	4,626	48.24%	338	3.52%	9,590
Frederick	9,910	42.50%	13,408	57.50%	-3,498	-15.00%	23,319 (Note: One write-in vote was recorded from this county.)
Garrett	2,357	31.79%	5,057	68.21%	-2,700	-36.42%	7,414
Harford	9,293	43.46%	12,090	56.54%	-2,797	-13.08%	21,383
Howard	5,412	43.42%	7,051	56.57%	-1,639	-13.15%	12,465 (Note: Two write-in votes were recorded from this county.)
Kent	3,079	48.54%	3,264	51.46%	-185	-2.92%	6,343
Montgomery	66,025	51.30%	62,679	48.70%	3,346	2.60%	128,704
Prince George's	62,013	58.05%	44,817	41.95%	17,196	16.10%	106,830
Queen Anne's	3,126	51.82%	2,906	48.18%	220	3.64%	6,032
Somerset	3,948	49.49%	4,030	50.51%	-82	-1.02%	7,978
St. Mary's	5,752	65.13%	3,080	34.87%	2,672	30.26%	8,832
Talbot	3,462	40.94%	4,995	59.06%	-1,533	-18.12%	8,457
Washington	15,632	46.72%	17,828	53.28%	-2,196	-6.56%	33,460
Wicomico	7,350	45.88%	8,671	54.12%	-1,321	-8.24%	16,021
Worcester	3,347	45.71%	3,976	54.29%	-629	-8.58%	7,323
Totals	565,808	53.61%	489,538	46.39%	76,270	7.22%	1,055,349

==== Counties that flipped from Republican to Democratic ====
- Baltimore (City)
- Calvert
- Charles
- Dorchester
- Montgomery
- Prince George's
- Queen Anne's
- St. Mary's

== See also ==
- United States presidential elections in Maryland
- 1960 United States presidential election
- 1960 United States elections
