= 1884 United States presidential election in Maryland =

- November 4, 1884

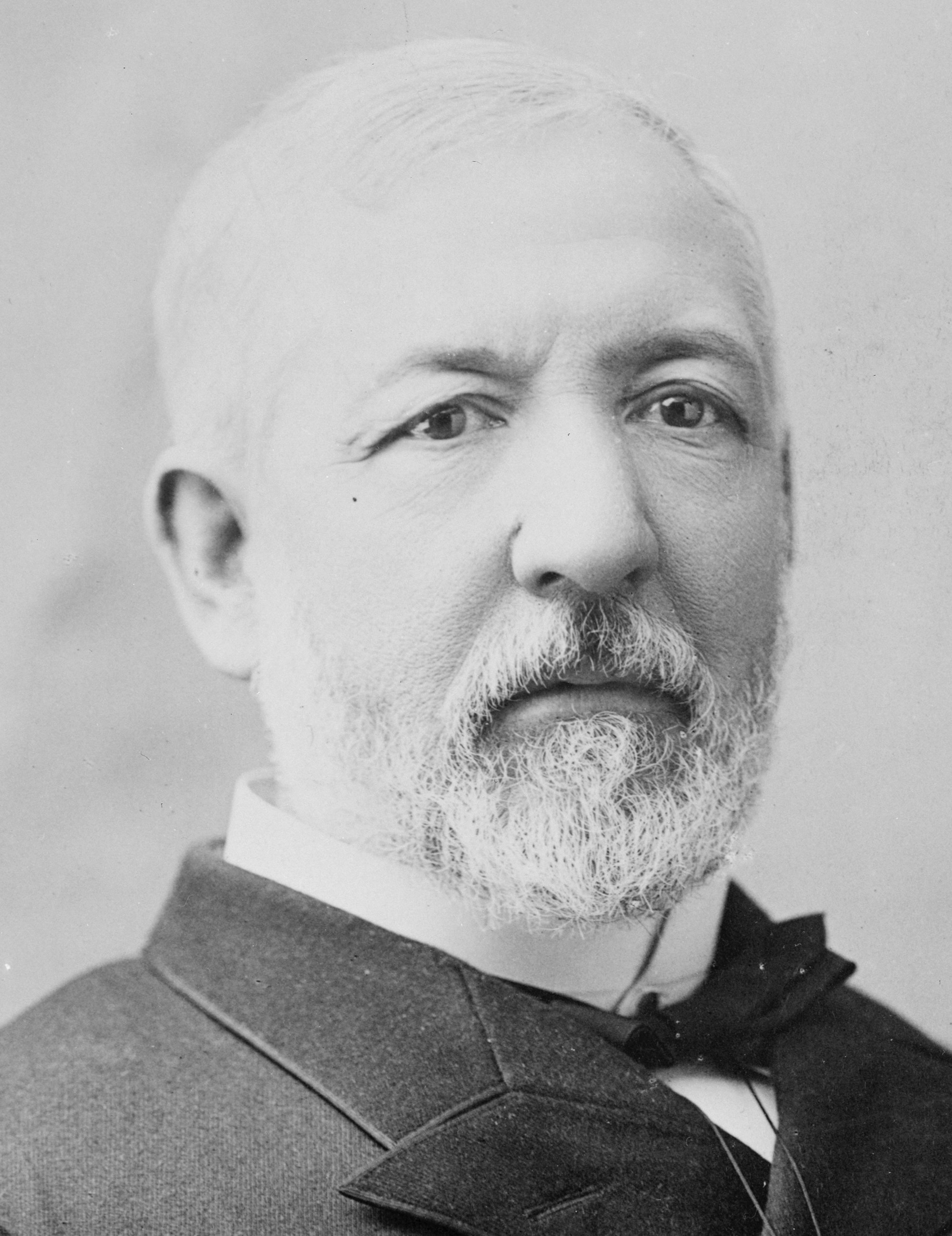
Nominee	Grover Cleveland	James G. Blaine
Party	Democratic	Republican
Home state	New York	Maine
Running mate	Thomas A. Hendricks	John A. Logan
Electoral vote	8	0
Popular vote	96,866	85,748
Percentage	52.07%	46.10%
County results
Cleveland
40–50%
50–60%
60–70%
Blaine
40–50%
50–60%
President before election
Chester A. Arthur
Republican
Elected President
Grover Cleveland
Democratic

The 1884 United States presidential election in Maryland took place on November 4, 1884, as part of the 1884 United States presidential election. Voters chose eight representatives, or electors, to the Electoral College, who voted for president and vice president.

Maryland voted for the Democratic nominee, Grover Cleveland, over the Republican nominee, James G. Blaine. by a margin of 5.98%.

In this election, Maryland voted 5.41% more Democratic than the nation at large.

== Results ==
1884 United States presidential election in Maryland
Party	Candidate	Running mate	Popular vote		Electoral vote	
Party	Candidate	Running mate	Count	%	Count	%
Democratic	Grover Cleveland of New York	Thomas Andrews Hendricks of Indiana	96,866	52.07%	8	100.00%
Republican	James Gillespie Blaine of Maryland	John Alexander Logan of Illinois	85,748	46.10%	0	0.00%
Prohibition	John Pierce St. John of Kansas	William Daniel of Maryland	2,827	1.52%	0	0.00%
Greenback	Benjamin Franklin Butler of Massachusetts	Absolom Madden West of Mississippi	578	0.31%	0	0.00%
Total			186,019	100.00%	8	100.00%

=== Results by county ===
County	Grover Cleveland Democratic		James Gillespie Blaine Republican		John Pierce St. John Prohibition		Benjamin Franklin Butler Greenback		Margin		Total votes cast
County	#	%	#	%	#	%	#	%	#	%	Total votes cast
Allegany	2880	43.20%	3328	49.92%	195	2.93%	263	3.95%	-448	-6.72%	6666
Anne Arundel	3052	51.77%	2813	47.72%	30	0.51%	0	0.00%	239	4.05%	5895
Baltimore (City)	34374	54.21%	27578	43.49%	1273	2.01%	188	0.30%	6796	10.72%	63,413
Baltimore (County)	7856	54.70%	6257	43.57%	227	1.58%	21	0.15%	1599	11.13%	14361
Calvert	926	44.89%	1093	52.98%	8	0.39%	36	1.75%	-167	-8.10%	2063
Caroline	1432	49.81%	1398	48.63%	43	1.50%	2	0.07%	34	1.18%	2875
Carroll	3589	52.39%	3206	46.80%	51	0.74%	4	0.06%	383	5.59%	6850
Cecil	2901	51.43%	2669	47.31%	68	1.21%	3	0.05%	232	4.11%	5641
Charles	1566	46.00%	1825	53.61%	12	0.35%	1	0.03%	-259	-7.61%	3404
Dorchester	2230	47.67%	2396	51.22%	52	1.11%	0	0.00%	-166	-3.55%	4678
Frederick	5204	47.89%	5497	50.59%	157	1.44%	8	0.07%	-293	-2.70%	10866
Garrett	1172	45.15%	1369	52.73%	22	1.27%	33	0.85%	-197	-7.59%	2596
Harford	3240	54.99%	2593	44.01%	56	0.95%	3	0.05%	647	10.98%	5892
Howard	1733	55.03%	1392	44.20%	23	0.73%	1	0.03%	341	10.83%	3149
Kent	2152	50.67%	2048	%	46	1.08%	1	0.02%	104	2.45%	4247
Montgomery	3145	54.86%	2495	43.52%	93	1.62%	0	0.00%	650	11.34%	5733
Prince George's	2971	50.73%	2850	48.67%	31	0.53%	4	0.07%	121	2.07%	5856
Queen Anne's	2344	57.18%	1710	41.72%	45	1.10%	0	0.00%	634	15.47%	4099
St. Mary's	1540	46.16%	1773	53.15%	23	0.69%	0	0.00%	-233	-6.98%	3336
Somerset	1734	45.57%	2022	53.14%	48	1.26%	1	0.03%	-288	-7.57%	3805
Talbot	2214	49.62%	2207	49.46%	39	0.87%	2	0.04%	7	0.16%	4462
Washington	4189	48.57%	4390	50.90%	44	0.51%	2	0.02%	-201	-2.33%	8625
Wicomico	2262	61.45%	1354	36.78%	65	1.77%	0	0.00%	908	24.67%	3681
Worcester	2231	57.44%	1474	37.95%	176	2.01%	3	0.30%	757	19.49%	3884
Total	96866	52.07%	85748	46.10%	2827	1.52%	578	0.31%	11118	5.97%	186077

==== Counties that flipped from Democratic to Republican ====
- Calvert

== See also ==
- United States presidential elections in Maryland
- 1884 United States presidential election
- 1884 United States elections
