= 1868 United States presidential election in Maryland =

- November 3, 1868
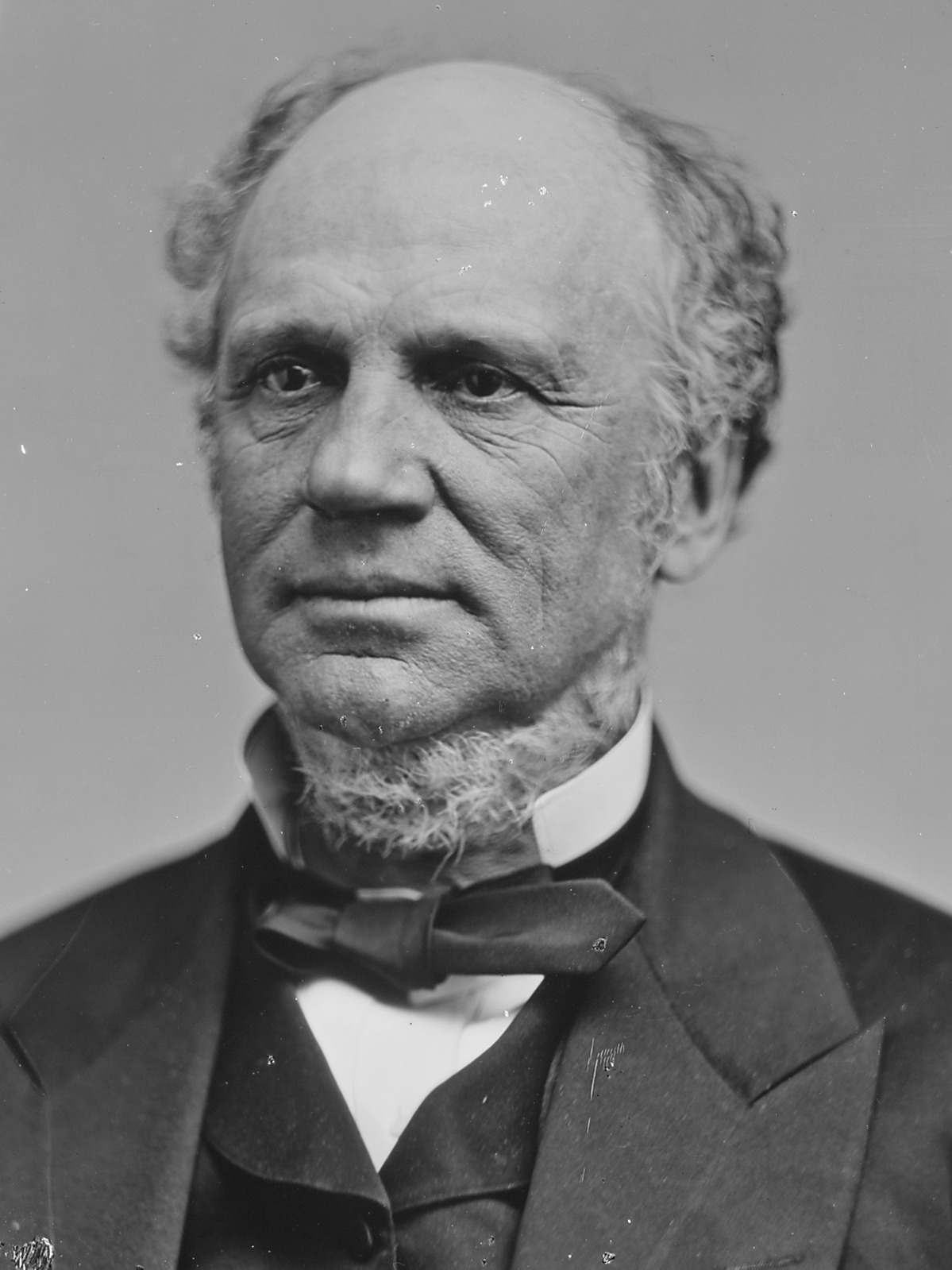

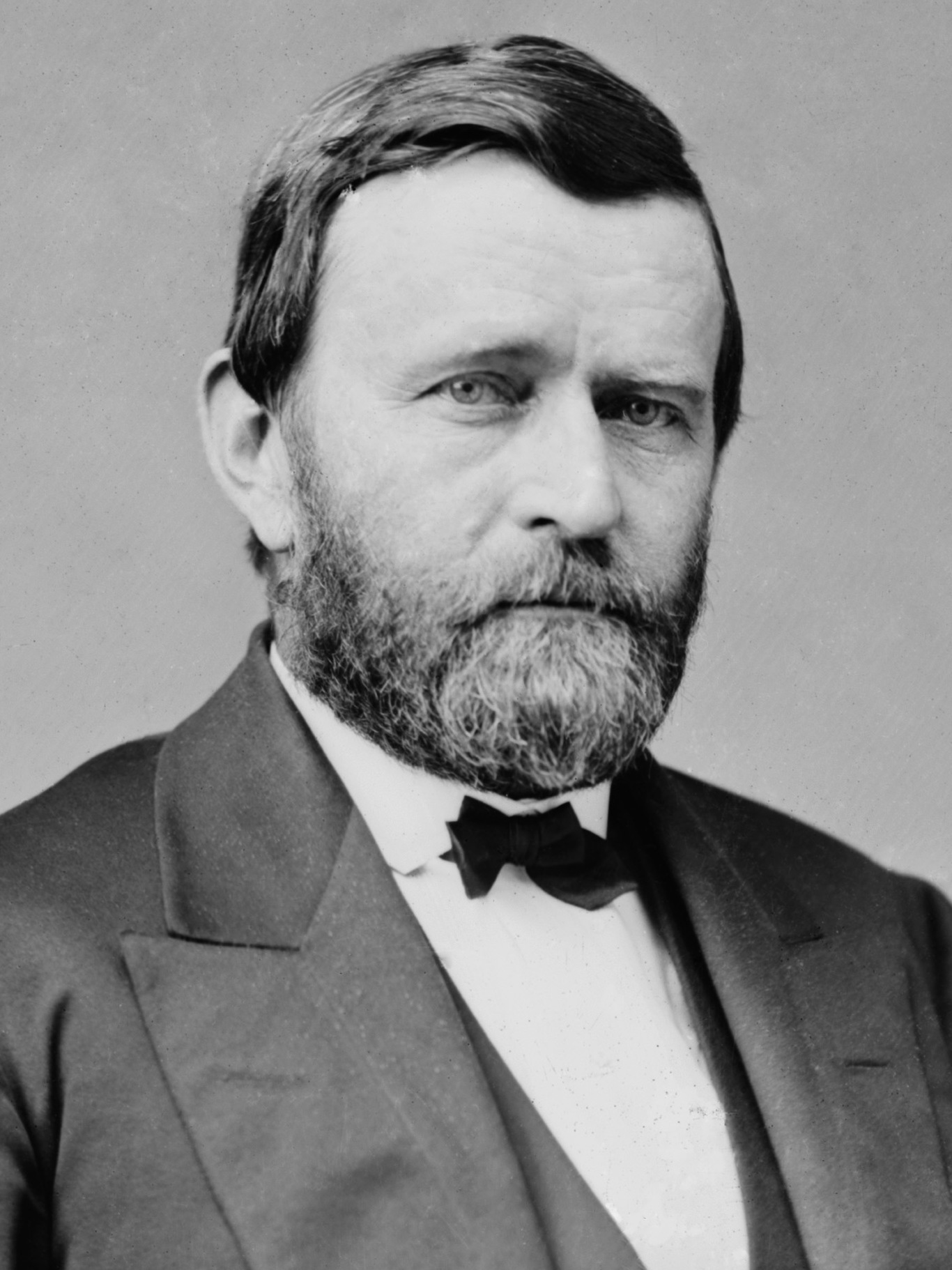
Nominee	Horatio Seymour	Ulysses S. Grant
Party	Democratic	Republican
Home state	New York	Illinois
Running mate	Francis Preston Blair Jr.	Schuyler Colfax
Electoral vote	7	0
Popular vote	62,357	30,438
Percentage	67.20%	32.80%
County results
Seymour
50–60%
60–70%
70–80%
80–90%
90–100%
Grant
50–60%
President before election
Andrew Johnson
Democratic
Elected President
Ulysses S. Grant
Republican

The 1868 United States presidential election in Maryland took place on November 3, 1868, as part of the 1868 United States presidential election. Voters chose seven representatives, or electors to the Electoral College, who voted for president and vice president.

Maryland voted for the Democratic nominee, Horatio Seymour over the Republican nominee, Ulysses S. Grant. Seymour won the state by a margin of 34.4%.

In this election, Maryland voted 39.72% more Democratic than the nation at-large.

With 67.2% of the popular vote, Maryland would be Seymour's third strongest victory in terms of percentage in the popular vote after Kentucky and Louisiana. To date this is the best performance by a Democrat in Maryland history.

This was the first presidential election that Wicomico County was able to vote in.

== Results ==
1868 United States presidential election in Maryland
Party	Candidate	Running mate	Popular vote		Electoral vote	
Party	Candidate	Running mate	Count	%	Count	%
Democratic	Horatio Seymour of New York	Francis Preston Blair Jr. of Missouri	62,357	67.20%	7	100.00%
Republican	Ulysses S. Grant of Illinois	Schuyler Colfax of Indiana	30,438	32.80%	0	0.00%
Total			92,795	100.00%	7	100.00%

=== Results by county ===
County	Horatio Seymour Democratic		Ulysses S. Grant Republican		Margin		Total votes cast
County	#	%	#	%	#	%	Total votes cast
Allegany	2721	52.85%	2428	47.15%	293	5.69%	5149
Anne Arundel	1670	82.92%	344	17.08%	1326	65.84%	2014
Baltimore (City)	21702	70.45%	9103	29.55%	12599	40.90%	30805
Baltimore (County)	4377	65.21%	2335	34.79%	2042	30.42%	6712
Calvert	625	90.32%	67	9.68%	558	80.64%	692
Caroline	2607	53.13%	2300	46.87%	307	6.26%	4907
Carroll	907	65.68%	474	34.32%	433	31.35%	1381
Cecil	2481	59.13%	1715	40.87%	766	18.26%	4196
Charles	1136	97.01%	35	2.99%	1101	94.02%	1171
Dorchester	1415	74.83%	476	25.17%	939	49.66%	1891
Frederick	3813	49.64%	3869	50.36%	-56	-0.73%	7682
Harford	2313	66.31%	1175	33.69%	1138	32.63%	3488
Howard	1012	67.38%	490	32.62%	522	34.75%	1502
Kent	1332	83.35%	266	16.65%	1066	66.71%	1598
Montgomery	1745	81.39%	399	18.61%	1346	62.78%	2144
Prince George's	1664	91.03%	164	8.97%	1500	82.06%	1828
Queen Anne's	1552	84.95%	275	15.05%	1277	69.90%	1827
St. Mary's	1182	96.81%	39	3.19%	1143	93.61%	1221
Somerset	989	70.14%	421	29.86%	568	40.28%	1410
Talbot	1252	77.81%	357	22.19%	895	55.62%	1609
Washington	3114	50.47%	3056	49.53%	58	0.94%	6170
Wicomico	1464	77.67%	421	22.33%	1043	55.33%	1885
Worcester	1319	85.21%	229	14.79%	1090	70.41%	1548
Total	62357	67.20%	30438	32.80%	31919	34.40%	92795

==== Counties that flipped from Republican to Democratic ====
- Alleghany
- Caroline
- Carroll
- Cecil
- Talbot
- Washington
- Baltimore (city)
- Baltimore

== See also ==
- United States presidential elections in Maryland
- 1868 United States presidential election
- 1868 United States elections
