= United States presidential elections in Maryland =

Presidential elections in Maryland
- Number of elections: 60
- Voted Democratic: 28
- Voted Republican: 14
- Voted Whig: 5
- Voted Democratic-Republican: 8
- Voted Federalist: 1
- Voted other: 4 (Note: John C. Breckinridge 1860; Millard Fillmore, 1856; George Washington, 1788-89, 1792)
- Voted for winning candidate: 43
- Voted for losing candidate: 17

Following is a table of United States presidential elections in Maryland, ordered by year. Since its admission to statehood in 1788, Maryland has participated in every U.S. presidential election. Considered a bellwether state during the 20th century, only voting for the losing candidate three times during that century, Maryland has since become one of the most blue (Democratic) states, last voting for a Republican candidate in 1988.

Winners of the state are in bold. The shading refers to the state winner, and not the national winner.

== Elections from 1864 to present ==
View source data.

Year	Winner (nationally)	Votes	Percent	Runner-up (nationally)	Votes	Percent	Other national candidates (Note: For purposes of these lists, other national candidates are defined as those who won at least one electoral vote, or won at least ten percent of the vote in multiple states.)	Votes	Percent	Electoral votes	Notes
2024	Donald Trump	1,035,550	34.08	**Kamala Harris**	1,902,577	62.62	-			10	
2020	**Joe Biden**	1,985,023	65.36	Donald Trump	976,414	32.15	—			10	
2016	Donald Trump (Note: Won the electoral college while losing the popular vote)	943,169	33.91	**Hillary Clinton**	1,677,928	60.33	-			10	
2012	**Barack Obama**	1,677,844	61.97	Mitt Romney	971,869	35.90	-			10	
2008	**Barack Obama**	1,629,467	61.92	John McCain	959,862	36.47	-			10	
2004	George W. Bush	1,024,703	42.93	**John Kerry**	1,334,493	55.91	-			10	
2000	George W. Bush	813,797	40.18	**Al Gore**	1,145,782	56.57	-			10	
1996	**Bill Clinton**	966,207	54.25	Bob Dole	681,530	38.27	Ross Perot	115,812	6.50	10	
1992	**Bill Clinton**	988,571	49.80	George H. W. Bush	707,094	35.62	Ross Perot	281,414	14.18	10	
1988	**George H. W. Bush**	876,167	51.11	Michael Dukakis	826,304	48.20	-			10	
1984	**Ronald Reagan**	879,918	52.51	Walter Mondale	787,935	47.02	-			10	
1980	Ronald Reagan	680,606	44.18	**Jimmy Carter**	726,161	47.14	John B. Anderson	119,537	7.76	10	
1976	**Jimmy Carter**	759,612	53.04	Gerald Ford	672,661	46.96	-			10	
1972	**Richard Nixon**	829,305	61.26	George McGovern	505,781	37.36	-			10	
1968	Richard Nixon	517,995	41.94	**Hubert Humphrey**	538,310	43.59	George Wallace	178,734	14.47	10	
1964	**Lyndon B. Johnson**	730,912	65.47	Barry Goldwater	385,495	34.53	-			10	
1960	**John F. Kennedy**	565,808	53.61	Richard Nixon	489,538	46.39	-			9	
1956	**Dwight D. Eisenhower**	559,738	60.04	Adlai Stevenson II	372,613	39.96	T. Coleman Andrews/ Unpledged Electors (Note: Was allied with a slate of unpledged electors in Louisiana, Mississippi and South Carolina)	-		9	
1952	**Dwight D. Eisenhower**	499,424	55.36	Adlai Stevenson II	395,337	43.83	-			9	
1948	Harry S. Truman	286,521	48.01	**Thomas E. Dewey**	294,814	49.40	Strom Thurmond	2,476	0.41	8	
1944	**Franklin D. Roosevelt**	315,490	51.85	Thomas E. Dewey	292,949	48.15	-			8	
1940	**Franklin D. Roosevelt**	384,546	58.25	Wendell Willkie	269,534	40.83	-			8	
1936	**Franklin D. Roosevelt**	389,612	62.35	Alf Landon	231,435	37.04	-			8	
1932	**Franklin D. Roosevelt**	314,314	61.50	Herbert Hoover	184,184	36.04	-			8	
1928	**Herbert Hoover**	301,479	57.06	Al Smith	223,626	42.33	-			8	
1924	**Calvin Coolidge**	162,414	45.29	John W. Davis	148,072	41.29	Robert M. La Follette	47,157	13.15	8	
1920	**Warren G. Harding**	236,117	55.11	James M. Cox	180,626	42.16	Parley P. Christensen	1,645	0.38	8	
1916	**Woodrow Wilson**	138,359	52.80	Charles E. Hughes	117,347	44.78	-			8	
1912	**Woodrow Wilson**	112,674	48.57	Theodore Roosevelt	57,789	24.91	William H. Taft	54,956	23.69	8	
1908	**William H. Taft**	116,513	48.85	William Jennings Bryan	115,908	48.59	-			8	Electoral vote split two for Taft to six for Bryan.
1904	**Theodore Roosevelt**	109,497	48.83	Alton B. Parker	109,446	48.81	-			8	Electoral vote split one for Roosevelt to seven for Parker.
1900	**William McKinley**	136,185	51.50	William Jennings Bryan	122,238	46.23	-			8	
1896	**William McKinley**	136,959	54.73	William Jennings Bryan	104,150	41.62	-			8	
1892	**Grover Cleveland**	113,866	53.39	Benjamin Harrison	92,736	43.48	James B. Weaver	796	0.37	8	
1888	Benjamin Harrison	99,986	47.40	**Grover Cleveland**	106,188	50.34	-			8	
1884	**Grover Cleveland**	96,866	52.07	James G. Blaine	85,748	46.10	-			8	
1880	James A. Garfield	78,515	45.59	**Winfield S. Hancock**	93,706	54.41	-			8	
1876	Rutherford B. Hayes	71,980	43.95	**Samuel J. Tilden**	91,779	56.05	-			8	
1872	Ulysses S. Grant	66,760	49.66	**Horace Greeley**	67,687	50.34	-			8	
1868	Ulysses S. Grant	30,438	32.8	**Horatio Seymour**	62,357	67.2	-			7	
1864	**Abraham Lincoln**	40,153	55.1	George B. McClellan	32,739	44.9	-			7	

== Election of 1860 ==
The election of 1860 was a complex realigning election in which the breakdown of the previous two-party alignment culminated in four parties each competing for influence in different parts of the country. The result of the election, with the victory of an ardent opponent of slavery, spurred the secession of eleven states and brought about the American Civil War.

Year	Winner (nationally)	Votes	Percent	Runner-up (nationally)	Votes	Percent	Runner-up (nationally)	Votes	Percent	Runner-up (nationally)	Votes	Percent	Electoral votes
1860	Abraham Lincoln	2,294	2.5	Stephen A. Douglas	5,966	6.4	**John C. Breckinridge**	42,482	45.9	John Bell	41,760	45.1	8

== Elections from 1828 to 1856 ==
Year	Winner (nationally)	Votes	Percent	Runner-up (nationally)	Votes	Percent	Other national candidates	Votes	Percent	Electoral votes	Notes
1856	James Buchanan	39,123	45.04	John C. Frémont	285	0.33	**Millard Fillmore**	47,452	54.63	8	
1852	**Franklin Pierce**	40,022	53.28	Winfield Scott	35,077	46.69	John P. Hale	21	0.03	8	
1848	**Zachary Taylor**	37,702	52.10	Lewis Cass	34,528	47.72	Martin Van Buren	129	0.18	8	
1844	James K. Polk	32,706	47.61	**Henry Clay**	35,984	52.39	-			8	
1840	**William Henry Harrison**	33,528	53.83	Martin Van Buren	28,752	46.17	-			10	
1836	Martin Van Buren	22,267	46.27	**William Henry Harrison**	25,852	53.73	various (Note: Three other candidates ran and received electoral votes nationally as part of the unsuccessful Whig strategy to defeat Martin Van Buren by running four candidates with local appeal in different regions of the country. The others were Hugh Lawson White, Daniel Webster, and Willie Person Mangum. None of these candidates appeared on the ballot in Maryland.)			10	
1832	Andrew Jackson	19,156	49.99	**Henry Clay**	19,160	50.01	William Wirt	no ballots		10	Electoral vote split five for Clay to three for Jackson, with two votes withheld.
1828	Andrew Jackson	22,782	49.75	**John Quincy Adams**	23,014	50.25	-			11	Electoral vote split six for Adams to five for Jackson.

== Election of 1824 ==
The election of 1824 was a complex realigning election following the collapse of the prevailing Democratic-Republican Party, resulting in four different candidates each claiming to carry the banner of the party, and competing for influence in different parts of the country. The election was the only one in history to be decided by the House of Representatives under the provisions of the Twelfth Amendment to the United States Constitution after no candidate secured a majority of the electoral vote. It was also the only presidential election in which the candidate who received a plurality of electoral votes (Andrew Jackson) did not become president, a source of great bitterness for Jackson and his supporters, who proclaimed the election of Adams a corrupt bargain.

Year	Winner (nationally)	Votes	Percent	Runner-up (nationally)	Votes	Percent	Runner-up (nationally)	Votes	Percent	Runner-up (nationally)	Votes	Percent	Electoral votes
1824	Andrew Jackson	14,523	43.73	**John Quincy Adams**	14,632	44.05	Henry Clay	695	2.09	William H. Crawford	3,364	10.13	Electoral vote split, seven for Jackson, three for Adams, and one for Crawford.

== Elections from 1788-1789 to 1820 ==
In the election of 1820, incumbent President James Monroe ran effectively unopposed, winning all 8 of Maryland's electoral votes, and all electoral votes nationwide except one vote in New Hampshire. To the extent that a popular vote was held, it was primarily directed to filling the office of vice president.

Year	Winner (nationally)	Runner-up (nationally)	Electoral votes	Notes
1820	James Monroe	-	11	Monroe effectively ran unopposed.
1816	James Monroe	Rufus King	8	
1812	James Madison	DeWitt Clinton	11	Electoral vote split, 6 for Madison, 5 for Clinton.
1808	James Madison	Charles C. Pinckney	11	Electoral vote split, nine for Madison and 2 for Pinckney.
1804	Thomas Jefferson	Charles C. Pinckney	11	Electoral vote split, nine for Jefferson, two for Pinckney.
1800	Thomas Jefferson	John Adams	10	Electoral vote split, five for Jefferson, five for Adams.
1796	John Adams	Thomas Jefferson	11	Electoral vote split, seven for Adams, four for Jefferson.
1792	George Washington	-	8	Washington effectively ran unopposed.
1788-89	George Washington	-	6	Washington effectively ran unopposed.

== See also ==
- Elections in Maryland
- United States presidential election
