= 1920 United States presidential election in Maryland =

- November 2, 1920
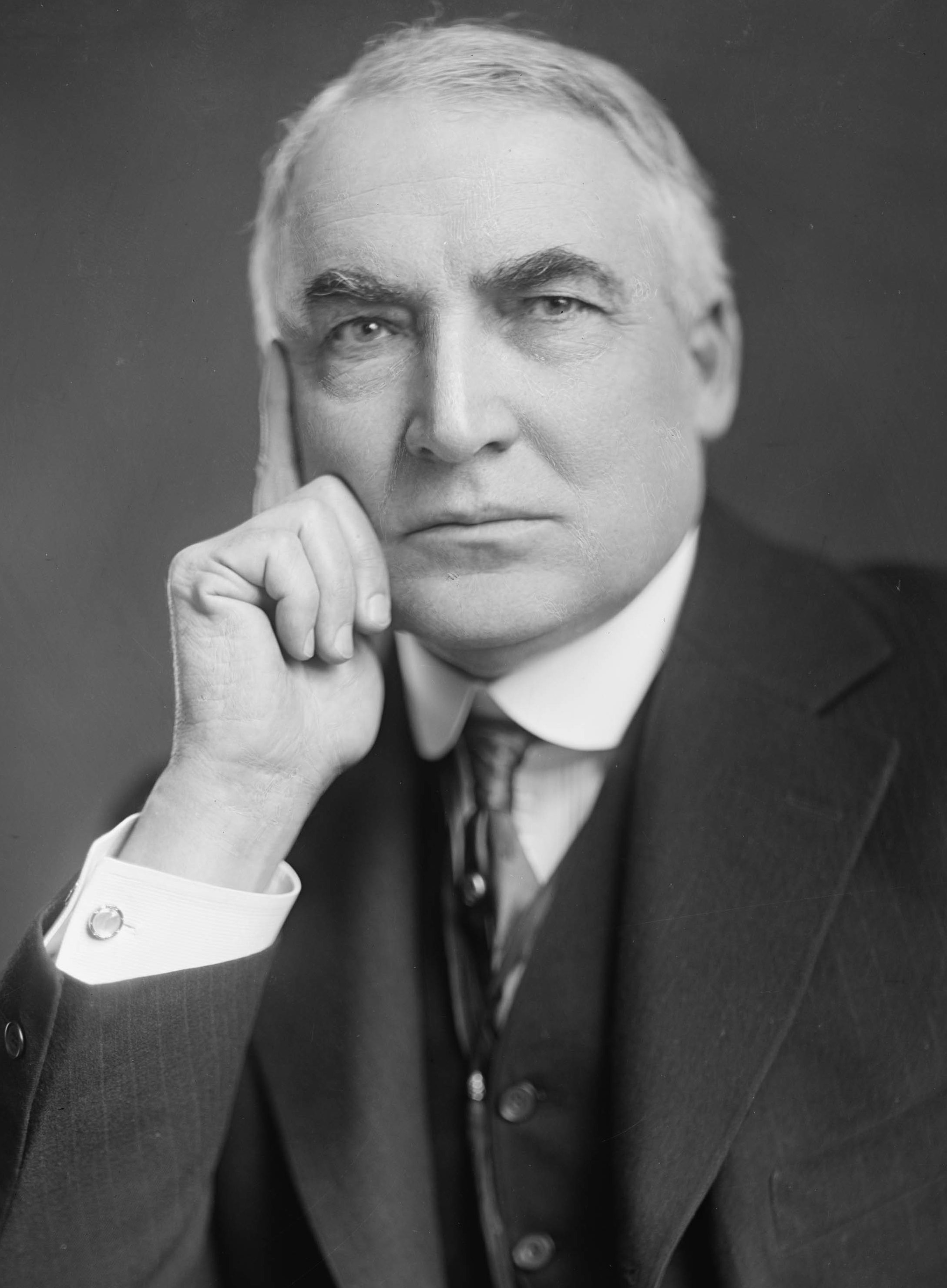

Nominee	Warren G. Harding	James M. Cox
Party	Republican	Democratic
Home state	Ohio	Ohio
Running mate	Calvin Coolidge	Franklin D. Roosevelt
Electoral vote	8	0
Popular vote	236,117	180,626
Percentage	55.11%	42.16%
County results
Harding
40–50%
50–60%
60–70%
70–80%
Cox
40–50%
50–60%
60–70%
President before election
Woodrow Wilson
Democratic
Elected President
Warren G. Harding
Republican

The 1920 United States presidential election in Maryland took place on November 2, 1920, as part of the 1920 United States presidential election which was held throughout all contemporary 48 states. Voters chose eight representatives, or electors to the Electoral College, who voted for president and vice president.

With its history as a slave state and substantial historic secessionist support, Maryland had been strongly Democratic during the Third Party System despite having Federalist and Whig tendencies under previous systems. However, hostility towards William Jennings Bryan's free silver and Populist tendencies in the cities meant that the state shifted Republican in 1896 and became very close in subsequent elections during the "System of 1896". Unlike former Confederate states and Oklahoma, Maryland did not succeed in disenfranchising its large black population despite several attempts, which helped the Republicans remain highly competitive in early twentieth-century state elections.

Woodrow Wilson had carried Maryland by 4.84 percentage points more than his national margin in 1916, which made it his best state outside the former Confederacy or West. Democratic nominee and former Ohio Governor James M. Cox did not campaign in the state, but Republican nominee and Ohio Senator Warren G. Harding, fearing that Cox might add the machine-controlled states of the Northeast to his “Solid South”, did campaign in Maryland during September. The first straw vote in mid-October showed Harding leading by around 300 votes out of 4,300, although that had reversed in a poll a week later, and at the end of October polls were divided with one giving the state to Cox but another saying that it would be safe for Harding if black women could be mustered to vote.

As it turned out, Harding carried the state comfortably: his margin was comparable to the other border states except Kentucky (where Cox was helped by Fayette County political boss Billy Kair) but Maryland was still 13.22 points more Democratic than the nation at-large or an 8 percent bigger differential than in 1916.

== Results ==
Presidential Candidate	Running Mate	Party	Electoral Vote (EV)	Popular Vote (PV)	
Warren G. Harding of Ohio	Calvin Coolidge	Republican	8	236,117	55.11%
James M. Cox	Franklin D. Roosevelt	Democratic	0	180,626	42.16%
Eugene V. Debs	Seymour Stedman	Socialist	0	8,876	2.07%
Parley P. Christensen	Max S. Hayes	Third Party	0	1,645	0.38%
William Wesley Cox	August Gillhaus	Labor	0	1,178	0.27%
Write-ins	—	—	0	1	0.00%

=== Results by county ===
County	Warren G. Harding Republican		James M. Cox Democratic		Eugene V. Debs Socialist		Parley P. Christensen Third Party		William Wesley Cox Labor		Margin		Total votes cast
County	#	%	#	%	#	%	#	%	#	%	#	%	Total votes cast
Allegany	9,595	57.37%	5,643	33.74%	1,291	7.72%	96	0.57%	100	0.60%	3,952	23.63%	16,725
Anne Arundel	6,199	54.52%	5,053	44.44%	70	0.62%	15	0.13%	33	0.29%	1,146	10.08%	11,370
Baltimore	12,432	56.04%	9,365	42.22%	233	1.05%	113	0.51%	40	0.18%	3,067	13.83%	22,183
Baltimore City	125,526	57.02%	86,748	39.40%	6,272	2.85%	1,091	0.50%	509	0.23%	38,778	17.61%	220,146
Calvert	1,741	58.01%	1,230	40.99%	8	0.27%	12	0.40%	10	0.33%	511	17.03%	3,001
Caroline	2,929	48.90%	3,012	50.28%	29	0.48%	17	0.28%	3	0.05%	-83	-1.39%	5,990
Carroll	5,784	57.13%	4,273	42.20%	18	0.18%	25	0.25%	25	0.25%	1,511	14.92%	10,125
Cecil	3,435	49.37%	3,468	49.85%	7	0.10%	26	0.37%	21	0.30%	-33	-0.47%	6,957
Charles	2,585	60.54%	1,642	38.45%	12	0.28%	2	0.05%	29	0.68%	943	22.08%	4,270
Dorchester	4,218	51.38%	3,950	48.11%	15	0.18%	6	0.07%	21	0.26%	268	3.26%	8,210
Frederick	9,559	54.57%	7,747	44.22%	98	0.56%	44	0.25%	70	0.40%	1,812	10.34%	17,518
Garrett	2,805	70.25%	1,070	26.80%	91	2.28%	6	0.15%	21	0.53%	1,735	43.45%	3,993
Harford	4,175	49.86%	4,134	49.37%	36	0.43%	13	0.16%	16	0.19%	41	0.49%	8,374
Howard	2,608	51.46%	2,397	47.30%	23	0.45%	13	0.26%	27	0.53%	211	4.16%	5,068
Kent	2,838	48.22%	3,034	51.55%	2	0.03%	4	0.07%	8	0.14%	-196	-3.33%	5,886
Montgomery	5,948	47.96%	6,277	50.61%	76	0.61%	50	0.40%	51	0.41%	-329	-2.65%	12,402
Prince George's	6,628	56.83%	4,857	41.64%	110	0.94%	45	0.39%	23	0.20%	1,771	15.18%	11,663
Queen Anne's	2,157	37.43%	3,519	61.07%	38	0.66%	29	0.50%	19	0.33%	-1,362	-23.64%	5,762
St. Mary's	2,175	53.13%	1,861	45.46%	27	0.66%	7	0.17%	24	0.59%	314	7.67%	4,094
Somerset	3,658	57.57%	2,634	41.45%	16	0.25%	3	0.05%	43	0.68%	1,024	16.12%	6,354
Talbot	3,050	49.19%	3,130	50.48%	11	0.18%	2	0.03%	7	0.11%	-80	-1.29%	6,200
Washington	8,757	54.75%	6,852	42.84%	353	2.21%	8	0.05%	25	0.16%	1,905	11.91%	15,995
Wicomico	4,225	45.39%	5,054	54.29%	12	0.13%	6	0.06%	12	0.13%	-829	-8.91%	9,309
Worcester	3,090	45.13%	3,676	53.69%	28	0.41%	12	0.18%	41	0.60%	-586	-8.56%	6,847
Totals	236,117	55.11%	180,626	42.16%	8,876	2.07%	1,645	0.38%	1,178	0.27%	55,491	12.95%	428,442

==== Counties that flipped from Democratic to Republican ====
- Anne Arundel
- Baltimore (City)
- Baltimore (County)
- Carroll
- Dorchester
- Frederick
- Harford
- Howard
- Prince George's
- St. Mary's
- Washington

== See also ==
- United States presidential elections in Maryland
- 1920 United States presidential election
- 1920 United States elections
