= 1856 United States presidential election in Maryland =

- November 4, 1856
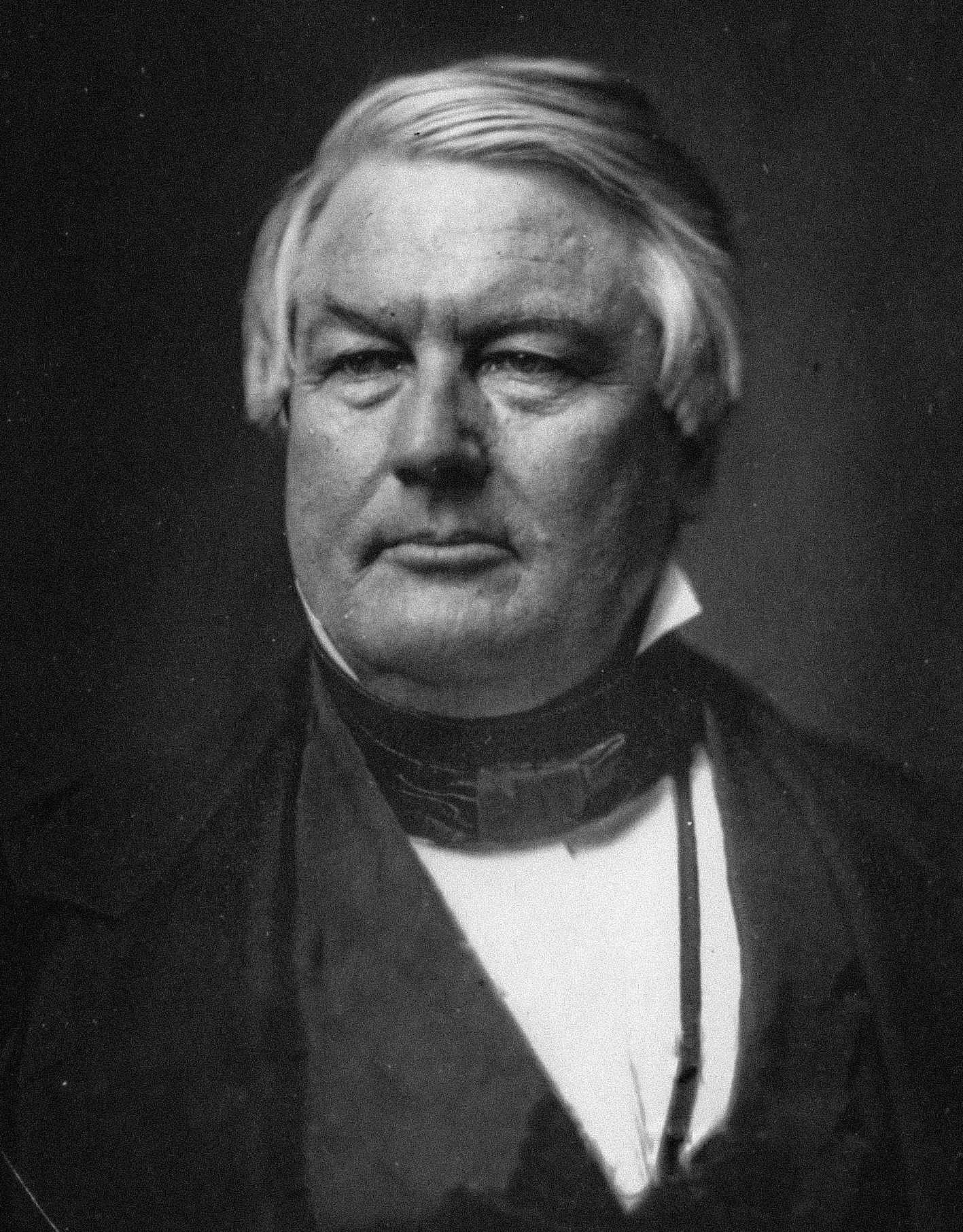

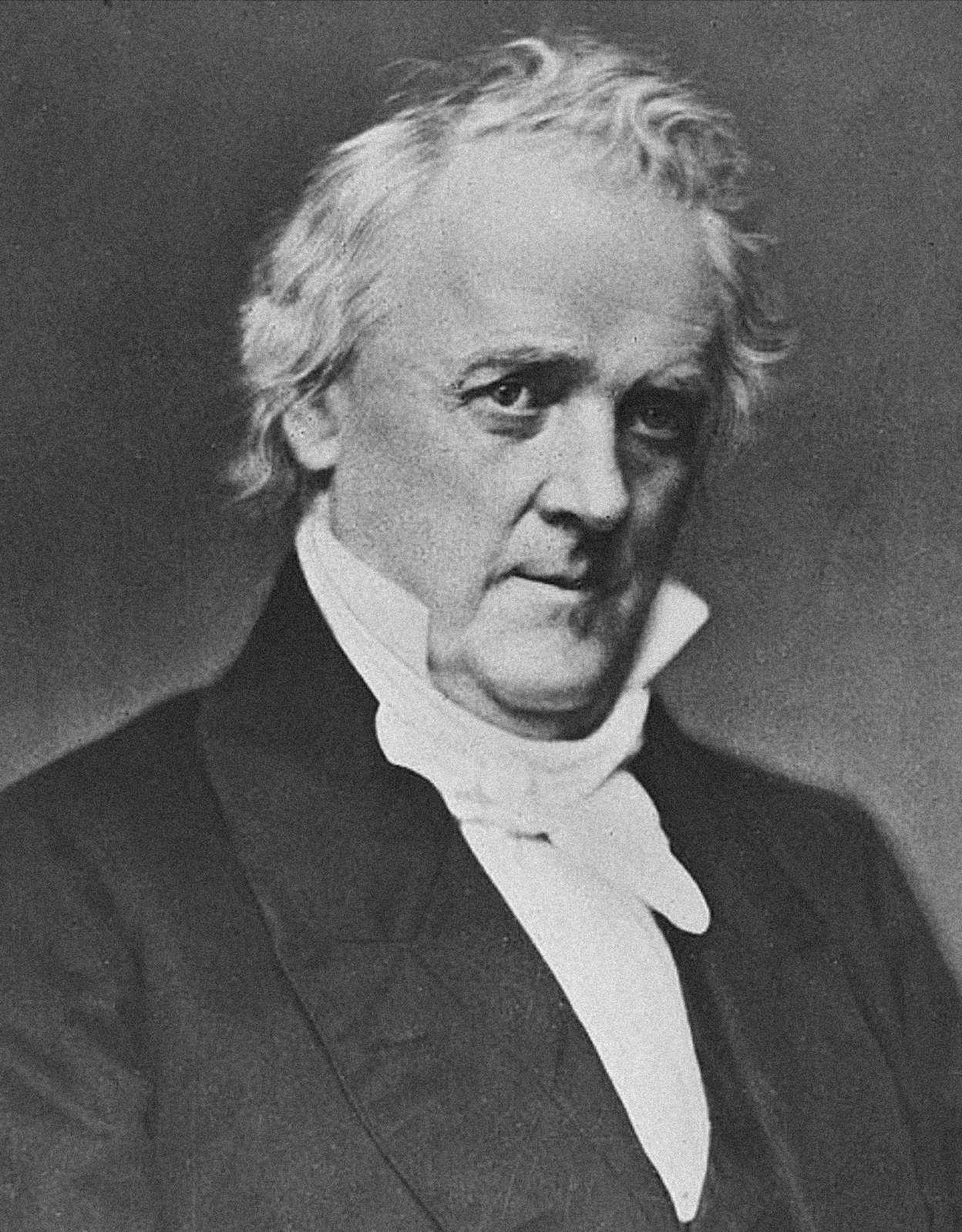
Nominee	Millard Fillmore	James Buchanan
Party	Know Nothing	Democratic
Home state	New York	Pennsylvania
Running mate	Andrew Jackson Donelson	John C. Breckinridge
Electoral vote	8	0
Popular vote	47,452	39,123
Percentage	54.63%	45.04%
County results
Fillmore
50–60%
60–70%
Buchanan
50–60%
60–70%
80–90%
President before election
Franklin Pierce
Democratic
Elected President
James Buchanan
Democratic

The 1856 United States presidential election in Maryland took place on November 4, 1856, as part of the 1856 United States presidential election. Voters chose eight representatives, or electors to the Electoral College, who voted for president and vice president.

Maryland voted for the Know Nothing candidate, former president Millard Fillmore, over the Democratic candidate, James Buchanan, and Republican candidate, John C. Frémont.

Fillmore won the state by a margin of 9.59%. Maryland was the only state to vote for Fillmore this election. This was the last time until 1948 that a Democrat won the presidency without carrying Maryland.

== Results ==
1856 United States presidential election in Maryland
Party	Candidate	Votes	%
Know Nothing	Millard Fillmore	47,452	54.63%
Democratic	James Buchanan	39,123	45.04%
Republican	John C. Frémont	285	0.33%
Total votes		86,860	100%

=== Results by county ===
County	Millard Fillmore Know Nothing		James Buchanan Democratic		John C. Frémont Republican		Margin		Total votes cast
County	#	%	#	%	#	%	#	%	Total votes cast
Allegany	1,938	46.30%	2,248	53.70%	0	0.00%	-310	-7.41%	4,186
Anne Arundel	1,043	52.94%	927	47.06%	0	0.00%	116	5.89%	1,970
Baltimore (City)	16,900	62.60%	9,882	36.61%	214	0.79%	7,018	26.00%	26,996
Baltimore (County)	3,504	52.56%	3,155	47.32%	8	0.12%	349	5.23%	6,667
Calvert	401	52.97%	356	47.03%	0	0.00%	45	5.94%	757
Caroline	638	46.16%	743	53.76%	1	0.07%	-105	-7.60%	1,382
Carroll	2,348	52.74%	2,099	47.15%	5	0.11%	249	5.59%	4,452
Cecil	1,884	50.25%	1,845	49.21%	20	0.53%	39	1.04%	3,749
Charles	461	37.82%	758	62.18%	0	0.00%	-297	-24.36%	1,219
Dorchester	1,292	56.79%	979	43.03%	4	0.18%	313	13.76%	2,275
Frederick	3,724	52.83%	3,304	46.87%	21	0.30%	420	5.96%	7,049
Harford	2,074	59.55%	1,405	40.34%	4	0.11%	669	19.21%	3,483
Howard	899	58.68%	633	41.32%	0	0.00%	266	17.36%	1,532
Kent	833	60.23%	550	39.77%	0	0.00%	283	20.46%	1,383
Montgomery	1,208	51.76%	1,126	48.24%	0	0.00%	82	3.51%	2,334
Prince George's	881	47.26%	983	52.74%	0	0.00%	-102	-5.47%	1,864
Queen Anne's	904	54.95%	741	45.05%	0	0.00%	163	9.91%	1,645
St. Mary's	247	19.01%	1,052	80.99%	0	0.00%	-805	-61.97%	1,299
Somerset	1,593	54.65%	1,321	45.32%	1	0.03%	272	9.33%	2,915
Talbot	749	45.15%	910	54.85%	0	0.00%	-161	-9.70%	1,659
Washington	2,717	50.41%	2,670	49.54%	3	0.06%	47	0.87%	5,390
Worcester	1,224	46.15%	1,428	53.85%	0	0.00%	-204	-7.69%	2,652
Total	47,452	54.63%	39,123	45.04%	285	0.33%	8,329	9.59%	86,860

==== Counties that flipped from Whig to Know Nothing ====
- Anne Arundel
- Calvert
- Carroll
- Cecil
- Dorchester
- Frederick
- Harford
- Howard
- Kent
- Montgomery
- Queen Anne's
- Somerset
- Washington

==== Counties that flipped from Democratic to Know Nothing ====
- Baltimore (city)
- Baltimore

==== Counties that flipped from Whig to Democratic ====
- Charles
- Prince George's
- St. Mary's
- Worcester

== See also ==
- United States presidential elections in Maryland
- 1856 United States presidential election
- 1856 United States elections
