= 1948 United States presidential election in Maryland =

- November 2, 1948

All 8 Maryland votes to the Electoral College
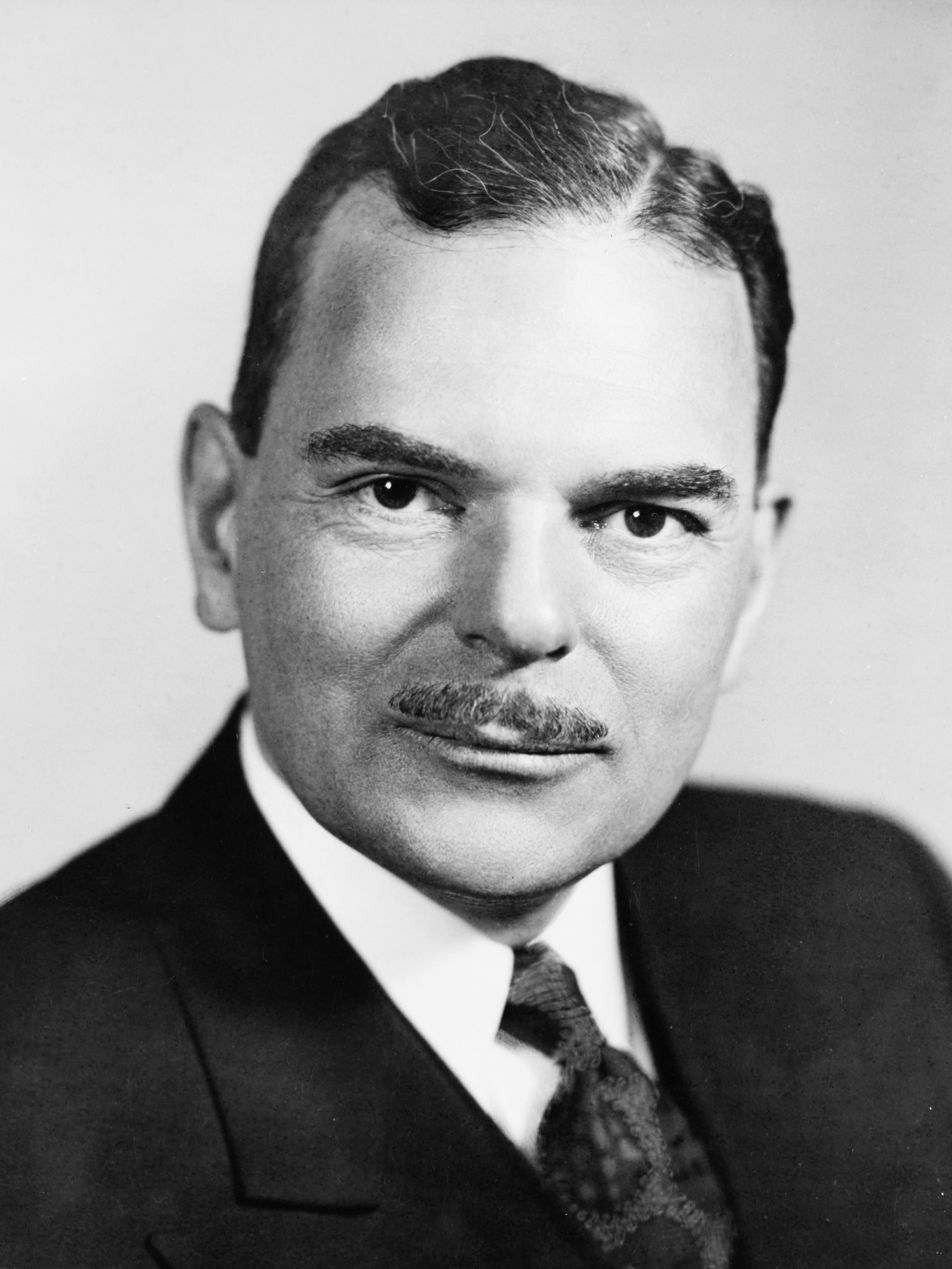

Nominee	Thomas E. Dewey	Harry S. Truman
Party	Republican	Democratic
Home state	New York	Missouri
Running mate	Earl Warren	Alben W. Barkley
Electoral vote	8	0
Popular vote	294,814	286,521
Percentage	49.40%	48.01%
County results
Dewey
40–50%
50–60%
60–70%
Truman
40–50%
50–60%
President before election
Harry S. Truman
Democratic
Elected President
Harry S. Truman
Democratic

The 1948 United States presidential election in Maryland took place on November 2, 1948, as part of the 1948 United States presidential election. State voters chose eight representatives, or electors, to the Electoral College, who voted for president and vice president.

Maryland was won by Governor Thomas E. Dewey (R–New York), running with Governor Earl Warren, with 49.40% of the popular vote, against incumbent President Harry S. Truman (D–Missouri), running with Senator Alben W. Barkley, with 48.01% of the popular vote. This was the first of three times between 1888 and 2000 that Maryland's popular vote had backed a losing candidate nationwide (along with 1968 and 1980).

To date, this is the last time that a Democratic candidate has won the presidency without carrying Maryland and the only time that the state has backed a losing Republican candidate.

== Results ==
1948 United States presidential election in Maryland
Party	Candidate	Votes	%
Republican	Thomas E. Dewey	294,814	49.40%
Democratic	Harry S. Truman (inc.)	286,521	48.01%
Progressive	Henry A. Wallace	9,649	1.67%
Socialist	Norman Thomas	2,941	0.49%
Write-in	Strom Thurmond	2,476	0.41%
Total votes		596,735	100%

=== Results by county ===
County	Thomas E. Dewey Republican		Harry S. Truman Democratic		Henry A. Wallace Progressive		Norman Thomas Socialist		Strom Thurmond Write-in		Margin		Total votes cast
County	#	%	#	%	#	%	#	%	#	%	#	%	Total votes cast
Allegany	14,375	49.00%	14,398	49.08%	452	1.54%	110	0.37%			-23	-0.08%	29,335
Anne Arundel	10,973	54.12%	8,713	42.98%	368	1.82%	220	1.09%			2,260	11.14%	20,274
Baltimore	41,846	56.18%	31,883	42.80%	531	0.71%	230	0.31%			9,963	13.38%	74,490
Baltimore City	110,879	43.67%	134,615	53.02%	7,226	2.85%	1,170	0.46%			-23,736	-9.35%	253,890
Calvert	1,919	50.43%	1,851	48.65%	22	0.58%	13	0.34%			68	1.78%	3,805
Caroline	2,746	52.73%	2,430	46.66%	20	0.38%	12	0.23%			316	6.07%	5,208
Carroll	8,003	64.89%	4,226	34.27%	54	0.44%	50	0.41%			3,777	30.62%	12,333
Cecil	3,866	46.94%	4,323	52.49%	32	0.39%	15	0.18%			-457	-5.55%	8,236
Charles	2,703	58.49%	1,878	40.64%	11	0.25%	29	0.63%			825	17.85%	4,621
Dorchester	3,751	44.92%	4,507	53.97%	45	0.54%	48	0.57%			-756	-9.05%	8,351
Frederick	9,934	57.77%	7,142	41.53%	79	0.46%	42	0.24%			2,792	16.24%	17,197
Garrett	3,536	64.34%	1,909	34.73%	28	0.51%	23	0.42%			1,627	29.61%	5,496
Harford	6,168	52.49%	5,494	46.76%	57	0.49%	31	0.26%			674	5.73%	11,750
Howard	3,113	51.64%	2,725	45.21%	158	2.62%	32	0.53%			388	6.43%	6,028
Kent	2,489	49.31%	2,524	50.00%	18	0.36%	17	0.34%			-35	-0.69%	5,048
Montgomery	23,174	60.34%	14,336	37.33%	386	1.01%	511	1.33%			8,838	23.01%	38,407
Prince George's	14,718	49.02%	14,874	49.54%	258	0.86%	174	0.58%			-156	-0.52%	30,024
Queen Anne's	2,038	42.98%	2,660	56.09%	23	0.49%	21	0.44%			-622	-13.11%	4,742
Somerset	3,129	49.67%	3,112	49.40%	14	0.22%	44	0.70%			17	0.27%	6,299
St. Mary's	2,247	48.78%	2,293	49.78%	32	0.69%	34	0.74%			-46	-1.00%	4,606
Talbot	3,585	59.95%	2,344	39.20%	28	0.47%	23	0.38%			1,241	20.75%	5,908
Washington	11,887	52.53%	10,588	46.79%	96	0.42%	59	0.26%			1,299	5.74%	22,630
Wicomico	5,062	48.14%	5,415	51.49%	23	0.22%	16	0.15%			-353	-3.35%	10,516
Worcester	2,673	53.53%	2,281	45.68%	22	0.44%	17	0.34%			392	7.85%	4,993
Totals	294,814	49.40%	286,521	48.01%	9,983	1.67%	2,941	0.49%	2,476	0.41%	8,293	1.39%	596,735

==== Counties that flipped from Republican to Democratic ====
- Allegany
- St. Mary's

== See also ==
- United States presidential elections in Maryland
- 1948 United States presidential election
- 1948 United States elections
