= 1876 United States presidential election in Maryland =

- November 7, 1876
- Turnout: 20.97% ▲3.75 pp
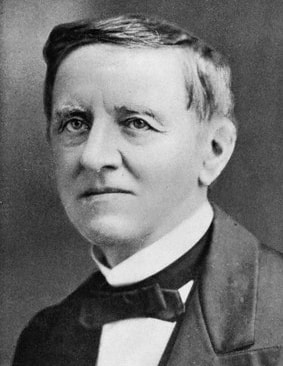

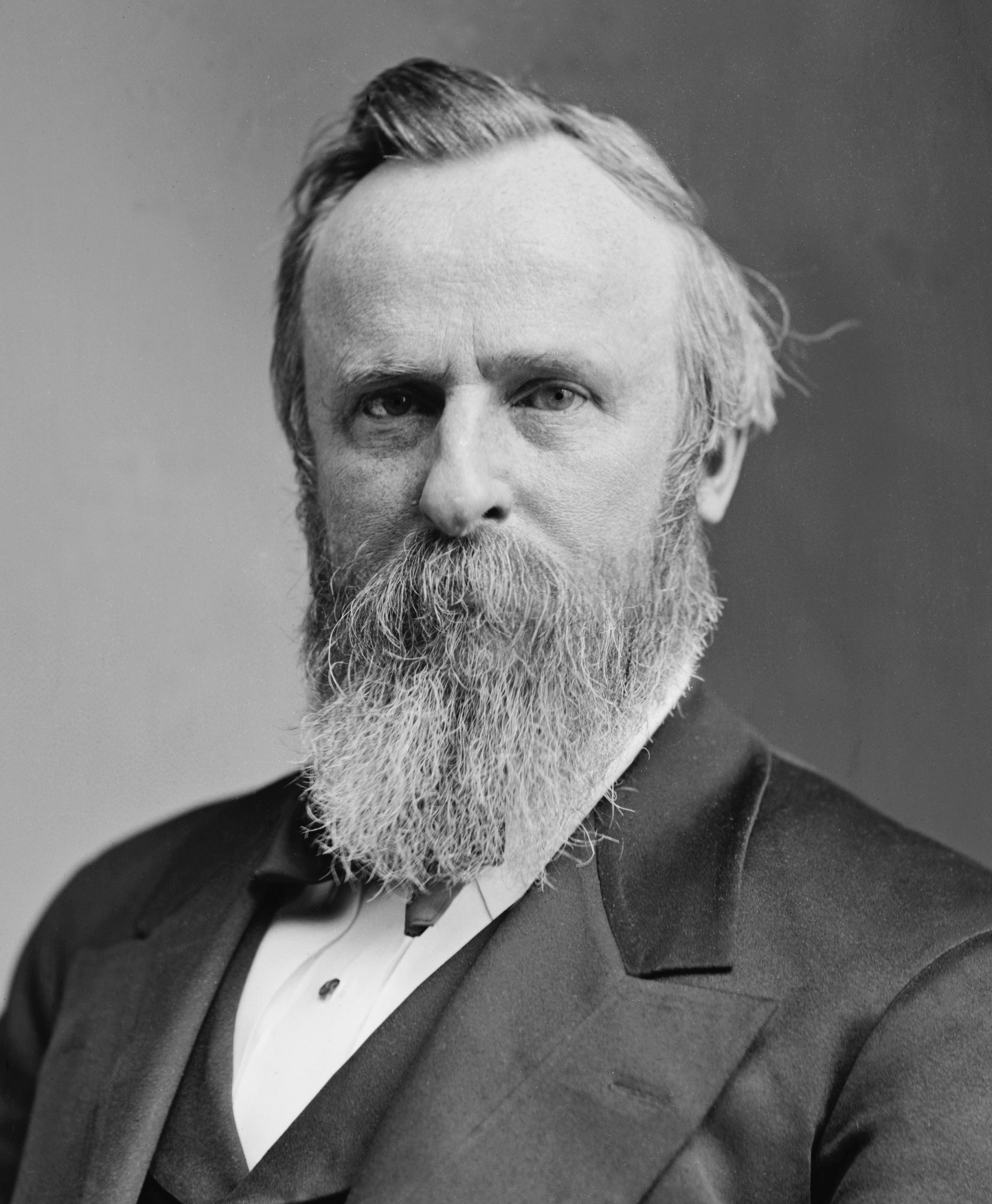
| Nominee | Samuel J. Tilden | Rutherford B. Hayes |
| Party | Democratic | Republican |
| Home state | New York | Ohio |
| Running mate | Thomas A. Hendricks | William A. Wheeler |
| Electoral vote | 8 | 0 |
| Popular vote | 91,779 | 71,980 |
| Percentage | 56.05% | 43.95% |
County results
Tilden
50–60%
60–70%
Hayes
50–60%
President before election
Ulysses S. Grant
Republican
Elected President
Rutherford B. Hayes
Republican

The 1876 United States presidential election in Maryland took place on November 7, 1876, as part of the 1876 United States presidential election. Maryland voters chose eight representatives, or electors, to the Electoral College, who voted for president and vice president.

Maryland was won by Samuel J. Tilden, the former governor of New York (D–New York), running with Thomas A. Hendricks, the governor of Indiana and future vice president, with 56.05% of the popular vote, against Rutherford B. Hayes, the governor of Ohio (R-Ohio), running with Representative William A. Wheeler, with 43.95% of the vote.

Notably, this is the closest any Democrat has come to winning the solidly Republican Garrett County since it was first formed in 1872. This is also the first Presidential election that Garrett County was able to vote in, as it was formed on November 4, 1872.

In this election, Maryland voted 9.09% more Democratic than the nation at-large.

== Results ==
1876 United States presidential election in Maryland
| Party | Candidate | Running mate | Popular vote | | Electoral vote | |
| Party | Candidate | Running mate | Count | % | Count | % |
|---|---|---|---|---|---|---|
| Democratic | Samuel J. Tilden of New York | Thomas A. Hendricks of Indiana | 91,779 | 56.05% | 8 | 100.00% |
| Republican | Rutherford B. Hayes of Ohio | William A. Wheeler of New York | 71,980 | 43.95% | 0 | 0.00% |
| Total | | | 163,759 | 100.00% | 8 | 100.00% |

=== Results by county ===
| County | Samuel J. Tilden Democratic | | Rutherford B. Hayes Republican | | Peter Cooper Greenback | | Margin | | Total votes Cast |
| County | # | % | # | % | # | % | # | % | Total votes Cast |
|---|---|---|---|---|---|---|---|---|---|
| Allegany | 3,303 | 50.66% | 3,217 | 49.34% | 0 | 0.00% | 86 | 1.32% | 6,520 |
| Anne Arundel | 3,130 | 58.23% | 2,245 | 41.77% | 0 | 0.00% | 885 | 16.47% | 5,375 |
| Baltimore (City) | 32,199 | 59.30% | 22,058 | 40.62% | 40 | 0.07% | 10,141 | 18.68% | 54,297 |
| Baltimore (County) | 7,304 | 59.36% | 5,001 | 40.64% | 0 | 0.00% | 2,303 | 18.72% | 12,305 |
| Calvert | 983 | 48.95% | 1,025 | 51.05% | 0 | 0.00% | -42 | -2.09% | 2,008 |
| Caroline | 1,249 | 53.72% | 1,076 | 46.28% | 0 | 0.00% | 173 | 7.44% | 2,325 |
| Carroll | 3,305 | 53.25% | 2,902 | 46.75% | 0 | 0.00% | 450 | 8.19% | 6,207 |
| Cecil | 2,971 | 54.10% | 2,521 | 45.90% | 0 | 0.00% | 450 | 8.19% | 5,492 |
| Charles | 1,657 | 50.17% | 1,646 | 49.83% | 0 | 0.00% | 11 | 0.33% | 3,303 |
| Dorchester | 2,082 | 53.37% | 1,819 | 46.63% | 0 | 0.00% | 263 | 6.74% | 3,901 |
| Frederick | 4,970 | 48.58% | 5,260 | 51.42% | 0 | 0.00% | -290 | -2.83% | 10,230 |
| Garrett | 978 | 49.57% | 995 | 50.43% | 0 | 0.00% | -17 | -0.86% | 1,973 |
| Harford | 3,026 | 59.59% | 2,052 | 40.41% | 0 | 0.00% | 974 | 19.18% | 5,078 |
| Howard | 1,641 | 57.94% | 1,189 | 41.98% | 2 | 0.07% | 452 | 15.96% | 2,832 |
| Kent | 1,937 | 53.48% | 1,685 | 46.52% | 0 | 0.00% | 252 | 6.96% | 3,622 |
| Montgomery | 2,865 | 57.89% | 2,084 | 42.11% | 0 | 0.00% | 781 | 15.78% | 4,949 |
| Prince George's | 2,617 | 51.85% | 2,430 | 48.15% | 0 | 0.00% | 187 | 3.71% | 5,047 |
| Queen Anne's | 2,149 | 59.28% | 1,476 | 40.72% | 0 | 0.00% | 673 | 18.57% | 3,625 |
| St. Mary's | 1,502 | 49.38% | 1,540 | 50.62% | 0 | 0.00% | -38 | 1.25% | 3,042 |
| Somerset | 1,914 | 51.73% | 1,786 | 48.27% | 0 | 0.00% | 128 | 3.46% | 3,700 |
| Talbot | 1,812 | 50.06% | 1,808 | 49.94% | 0 | 0.00% | 4 | 0.11% | 3,620 |
| Washington | 4,019 | 50.78% | 3,886 | 49.10% | 9 | 0.11% | 133 | 1.68% | 7,915 |
| Wicomico | 2,073 | 65.75% | 1,080 | 34.25% | 0 | 0.00% | 993 | 31.49% | 3,153 |
| Worcester | 2,693 | 69.19% | 1,199 | 30.81% | 0 | 0.00% | 1,494 | 38.39% | 3,892 |
| Total | 91,779 | 56.05% | 71,980 | 43.95% | | | 19,799 | 12.10% | 163,759 |

==== Counties that flipped from Republican to Democratic ====
- Alleghany
- Anne Arundel
- Caroline
- Carroll
- Cecil
- Charles
- Dorchester
- Harford
- Howard
- Kent
- Prince George's
- Somerset
- Talbot
- Washington

==== Counties that flipped from Liberal Republican to Democratic ====
- Baltimore (city)
- Baltimore
- Montgomery
- Queen Anne's
- Wicomico
- Worcester

== See also ==
- United States presidential elections in Maryland
- 1876 United States presidential election
- 1876 United States elections
