= 1792 United States presidential election in Maryland =

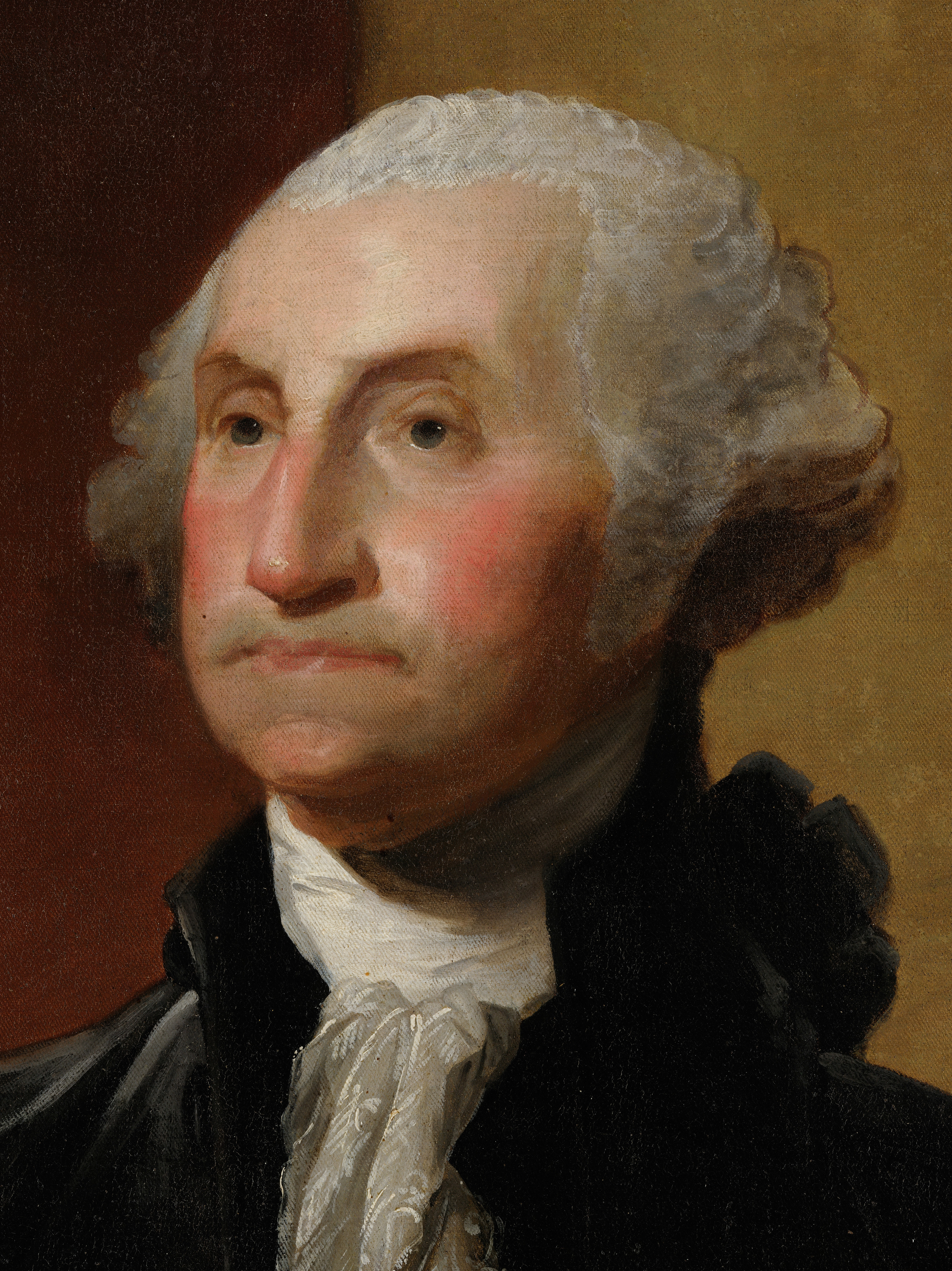

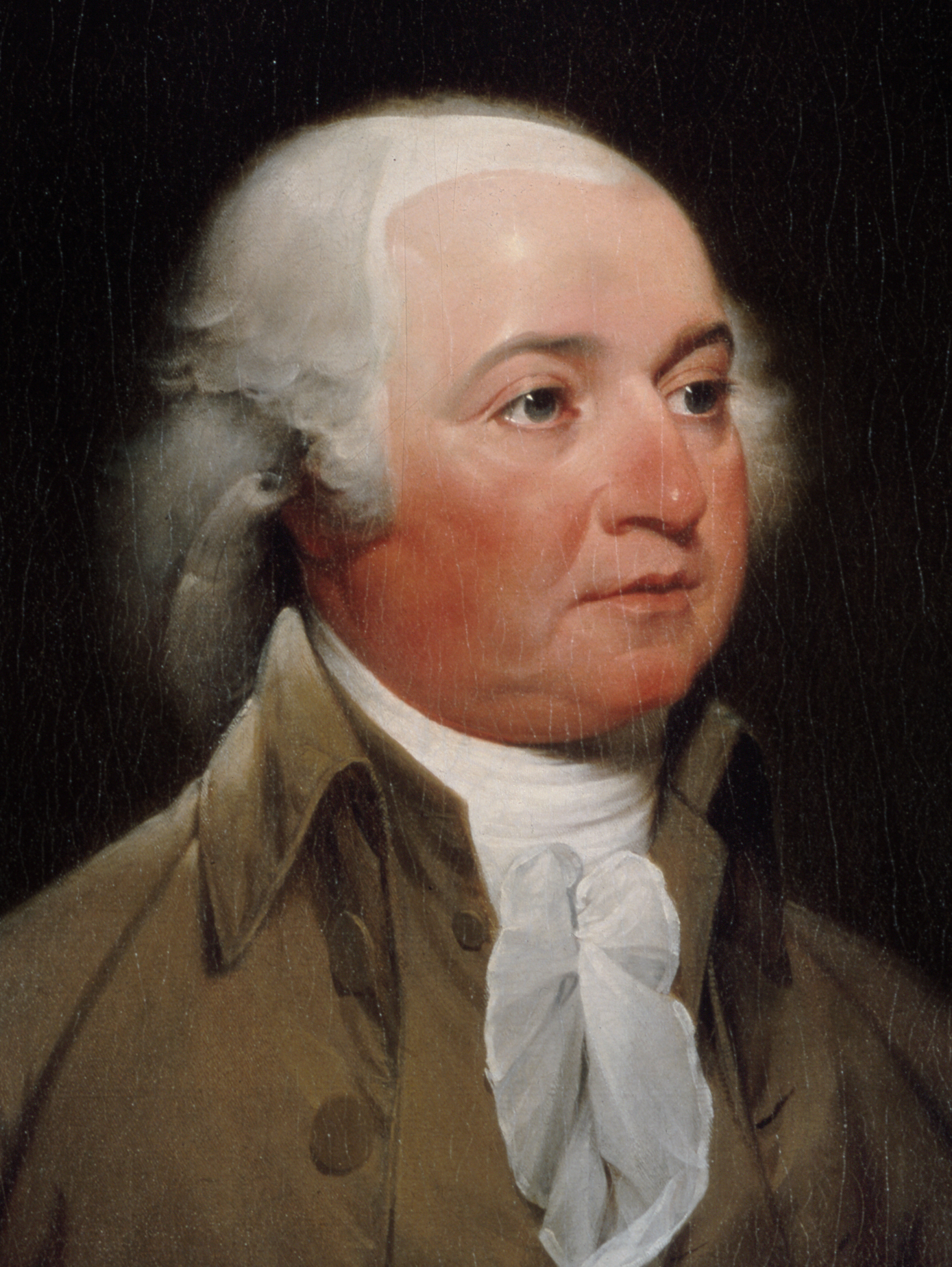
Nominee	George Washington	John Adams
Party	Independent	Federalist
Home state	Virginia	Massachusetts
Electoral vote	8 (10)	8
Popular vote	1,184
Percentage	100.00%
County results
Washington
90–100%
President before election
George Washington
Independent
Elected President
George Washington
Independent

A presidential election was held in Maryland on an unknown date in 1792, as part of the 1792 presidential election. Voters chose eight representatives, or electors, to the Electoral College, who voted for president and vice president.

Early elections were quite different from modern ones. Voters voted for individual electors, who were pledged to vote for certain candidates. Often, which candidate an elector intended to support was unclear. Prior to the ratification of the 12th amendment, each elector did not distinguish between a vote cast for president and vice president and simply cast two votes.

Very little is known about this election. In his book, Presidential Elections in Maryland, former Maryland Secretary of State John T. Willis writes that voters used the general ticket method and that all of the 898 votes cast were for Washington electors.

This election marks one of two in American history in which a candidate swept all of Maryland's counties; the other was Dwight D. Eisenhower in 1956.

== Results by presidential candidates ==
1792 United States presidential election in Maryland
Party	Candidate	Votes	%
Independent	George Washington	1,184	100.00%
Total votes		1,184	100.00%

=== Results by county ===
1792 United States presidential election in Maryland
County	George Washington Independent		Margin		Total (Note: Results for George Washington are taken from the highest voted elector with either a formal ticket pledge, or a submitted electoral vote, for each county.)
County	#	%	#	%	Total
Allegany	38	100.00%	38	100.00%	38
Anne Arundel	37	100.00%	37	100.00%	37
Baltimore	14	100.00%	14	100.00%	14
Baltimore Town	180	100.00%	180	100.00%	180
Calvert	12	100.00%	12	100.00%	12
Caroline	31	100.00%	31	100.00%	31
Cecil	128	100.00%	128	100.00%	128
Charles	67	100.00%	67	100.00%	67
Dorchester	19	100.00%	19	100.00%	19
Frederick	47	100.00%	47	100.00%	47
Harford	50	100.00%	50	100.00%	50
Kent	256	100.00%	256	100.00%	256
Montgomery	30	100.00%	30	100.00%	30
Prince George's	15	100.00%	15	100.00%	15
Queen Anne's	66	100.00%	66	100.00%	66
St. Mary's	29	100.00%	29	100.00%	29
Somerset	60	100.00%	60	100.00%	60
Talbot	72	100.00%	72	100.00%	72
Washington	33	100.00%	33	100.00%	33
Worcester	No data		No data		
Total	1,184	100.00%	1,184	100.00%	1,184

=== Results by district ===
1792 United States presidential election in Maryland
District	E.V.	George Washington Independent			Margin		Total (Note: Results for George Washington are taken from the highest voted elector with either a formal ticket pledge, or a submitted electoral vote, for each district.)
District	E.V.	#	%	E.V.	#	%	Total
1st	10	108	100.00%	8	108	100.00%	108
2nd	10	52	100.00%	8	52	100.00%	52
3rd	10	30	100.00%	8	30	100.00%	30
4th	10	118	100.00%	8	118	100.00%	118
5th	10	194	100.00%	8	194	100.00%	194
6th	10	434	100.00%	8	434	100.00%	434
7th	10	169	100.00%	8	169	100.00%	169
8th	10	79	100.00%	8	79	100.00%	79
Total	10	1,184	100.00%	8	1,184	100.00%	1,184

== Results by presidential electors ==
1792 United States presidential election in Maryland
Party	Candidate	Votes	%
Federalist	Federalist electors	1,218	78.63%
Democratic-Republican	Democratic-Republican electors	331	21.37%
Total votes		1,549	100.00%

=== Results by county ===
1792 United States presidential election in Maryland
County	Federalist electors		Democratic-Republican electors		Margin		Total (Note: Results are taken from the highest voted Federalist, and Democratic-Republican elector for each county.)
County	#	%	#	%	#	%	Total
Allegany	38	100.00%	0	0.00%	38	100.00%	38
Anne Arundel	37	50.00%	37	50.00%	0	0.00%	74
Baltimore	14	70.00%	6	30.00%	8	40.00%	20
Baltimore Town	180	97.83%	4	2.17%	176	95.66%	184
Calvert	12	100.00%	0	0.00%	12	100.00%	12
Caroline	31	53.45%	27	46.55%	4	6.90%	58
Cecil	128	50.00%	128	50.00%	0	0.00%	256
Charles	73	100.00%	0	0.00%	73	100.00%	73
Dorchester	19	100.00%	0	0.00%	19	100.00%	19
Frederick	47	95.92%	2	4.08%	45	91.84%	49
Harford	50	100.00%	0	0.00%	50	100.00%	50
Kent	256	82.58%	54	17.42%	202	65.16%	310
Montgomery	30	76.92%	9	23.08%	21	53.84%	39
Prince George's	15	100.00%	0	0.00%	15	100.00%	15
Queen Anne's	66	71.74%	26	28.26%	40	43.48%	92
St. Mary's	57	86.36%	9	13.64%	48	72.72%	66
Somerset	60	100.00%	0	0.00%	60	100.00%	60
Talbot	72	71.29%	29	28.71%	43	42.58%	101
Washington	33	100.00%	0	0.00%	33	100.00%	33
Worcester	No data		No data		No data		
Total	1,218	78.63%	331	21.37%	887	57.26%	1,549

==== Results by county swing ====
Swing compared to the 1788-89 election
County	Party		Status
County	Federalist	Democratic-Republican / Anti-Federalist (Note: Swing data compares Democratic-Republican performance to previous Anti-Federalist performance. The Democratic-Republican party is considered to be the direct evolution of the Anti-Federalist coalition.)	Status
County	± pp	± pp	Status
Allegany	No data	No data	New
Anne Arundel	▲19.13 pp	▼19.13 pp	Tied
Baltimore	▲51.35 pp	▼51.35 pp	Flip
Baltimore Town	▲41.39 pp	▼41.39 pp	Gain
Calvert	▲37.08 pp	▼37.08 pp	Gain
Caroline	▼45.77 pp	▲45.77 pp	Loss
Cecil	▼50.00 pp	▲50.00 pp	Tied
Charles	▲8.98 pp	▼8.98 pp	Gain
Dorchester	▲37.36 pp	▼37.36 pp	Gain
Frederick	▼3.70 pp	▲3.70 pp	Loss
Harford	▲35.44 pp	▼35.44 pp	Gain
Kent	▲2.81 pp	▼2.81 pp	Gain
Montgomery	▼11.70 pp	▲11.70 pp	Loss
Prince George's	▲47.09 pp	▼47.09 pp	Gain
Queen Anne's	▲20.74 pp	▼20.74 pp	Gain
St. Mary's	▲14.42 pp	▼14.42 pp	Gain
Somerset	▲0.93 pp	▼0.93 pp	Gain
Talbot	▼28.71 pp	▲28.71 pp	Loss
Washington	0.00 pp	0.00 pp	Hold
Worcester	No data	No data	N/A
Total	▲8.55 pp	▼8.55 pp	Gain

=== Results by district ===
1792 United States presidential election in Maryland
District	E.V.	Federalist electors			Democratic-Republican electors			Margin		Total (Note: Results are taken from the highest voted Federalist, and Democratic-Republican elector for each district.)
District	E.V.	#	%	E.V.	#	%	E.V.	#	%	Total
1st	10	142	94.04%	8	9	5.96%	0	133	88.08%	151
2nd	10	52	58.43%	8	37	41.57%	0	15	16.86%	89
3rd	10	30	76.92%	8	9	23.08%	0	21	53.84%	39
4th	10	118	98.33%	8	2	1.67%	0	116	96.66%	120
5th	10	194	95.10%	8	10	4.90%	0	184	90.20%	204
6th	10	434	70.45%	8	182	29.55%	0	252	40.90%	616
7th	10	169	67.33%	8	82	32.67%	0	87	34.66%	251
8th	10	79	100.00%	8	0	0.00%	0	79	100.00%	79
Total	10	1,218	78.63%	8	331	21.37%	0	887	57.26%	1,549

=== Results by elector ===
1792 United States presidential election in Maryland (Note: Maryland used the general ticket (at-large) system for this election. Voters could vote up to 6 candidates from the Western Shore and 4 from the Eastern Shore. There were no coherent slates, but all eight electors who voted were Federalists.)
Party	Candidate	Votes	%
Federalist	Alexander C. Hanson (Note: Federalist elector for this election.)	898	8.89%
Federalist	William Richardson	806	7.98%
Federalist	John Eager Howard	724	7.17%
Federalist	Donaldson Yeates	519	5.14%
Federalist	William Smith (Note: The electoral vote from this elected candidate was never submitted or recorded.)	478	4.73%
Federalist	Thomas Sim Lee	449	4.45%
Federalist	Joshua Seney	432	4.28%
Federalist	Levin Winder	430	4.26%
Federalist	Samuel Hughes	429	4.25%
Federalist	Richard Potts	399	3.95%
Unknown	Absalom Ridgely	338	3.35%
Federalist	William Tilghman (Note: Federalist partisan during the 1790s.)	310	3.07%
Federalist	William Perry (Note: A leader of the Federalist party in national politics after 1789.)	285	2.82%
Federalist	Benjamin Stoddert (Note: Federalist candidate for the Maryland State Senate in 1791.)	271	2.68%
Federalist	John Hoskins Stone (Note: Staunch federalist partisan during the 1790s. Federalist governor serving from 1974-1797.)	238	2.36%
Unknown	Nicholas Hammond	222	2.20%
Federalist	John Thomas (Note: Federalist candidate for the Maryland House of Representatives in 1792.)	215	2.13%
Democratic-Republican	William Dorsey (Note: Anti-Federalist candidate for the Maryland House of Representatives in 1792.)	215	2.13%
Federalist	William Deakins (Note: Supported the federal constitution Supported the establishment of the Federal City in Georgetown in 1793. Supported Jay's Treaty in 1795. No documented political/oppositional shift noted during the 1790s.)	210	2.08%
Federalist	Philip Thomas (Note: A leader of the Federalist party in national politics after 1789.)	183	1.81%
Unknown	Richard Bond	180	1.78%
Unknown	Peregrine Letherbury	175	1.73%
Federalist	Uriah Forrest (Note: Federalist candidate for the Maryland House of Representatives in 1792.)	162	1.60%
Democratic-Republican	Gabriel DuVall (Note: Anti-Administration candidate for the 3rd United States Congress (1793-1795).)	153	1.52%
Unknown	John Rousby Plater	124	1.23%
Federalist	Samuel Chase (Note: Federalist partisan during the 1790s.)	122	1.21%
Unknown	John Hall	120	1.19%
Unknown	Edward Lloyd	115	1.14%
Unknown	John Dorsey	114	1.13%
Unknown	Benjamin Dashiell	113	1.12%
Unknown	Walter Bowie	97	0.96%
Unknown	William Winder	82	0.81%
Unknown	Robert Wright	72	0.71%
Federalist	James Brice (Note: Federalist Governor in 1792.)	50	0.50%
Unknown	James Ringgold	50	0.50%
Unknown	John Carlisle	50	0.50%
Federalist	John Henry (Note: Pro-Administration and Federalist partisan during the 1790s.)	49	0.49%
Federalist	John Done (Note: Supported the federal constituion. Later a federalist presidential elector in 1796. No documented political/oppositional shift noted during the 1790s.)	38	0.38%
Unknown	John Gale	34	0.34%
Unknown	William Seney	33	0.33%
Unknown	John Seney	29	0.29%
Unknown	Moses Rawlings	27	0.27%
Federalist	Charles Goldsborough (Note: Federalist partisan during the 1790s.)	23	0.23%
Federalist	James McHenry (Note: A staunch federalist and federalist partisan during the 1790s.)	11	0.11%
Democratic-Republican	James Tilghman (Note: Anti-Federalist candidate for the Maryland House of Representatives in 1792.)	9	0.09%
Unknown	Edward Downes	5	0.05%
Unknown	John Scott	3	0.03%
Federalist	William Matthews (Note: Federalist candidate for the Maryland House of Representatives in 1792.)	3	0.03%
Unknown	Benjamin Mackall	2	0.02%
Unknown	David Crawford	2	0.02%
Unknown	John Stewart	1	0.01%
Total votes		10,099	100.00%

== See also ==
- United States presidential elections in Maryland
- 1792 United States presidential election
- 1792 United States elections
