= 1880 United States presidential election in Maryland =

- November 2, 1880
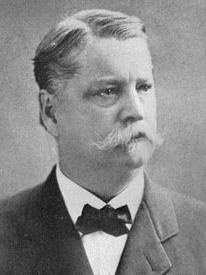

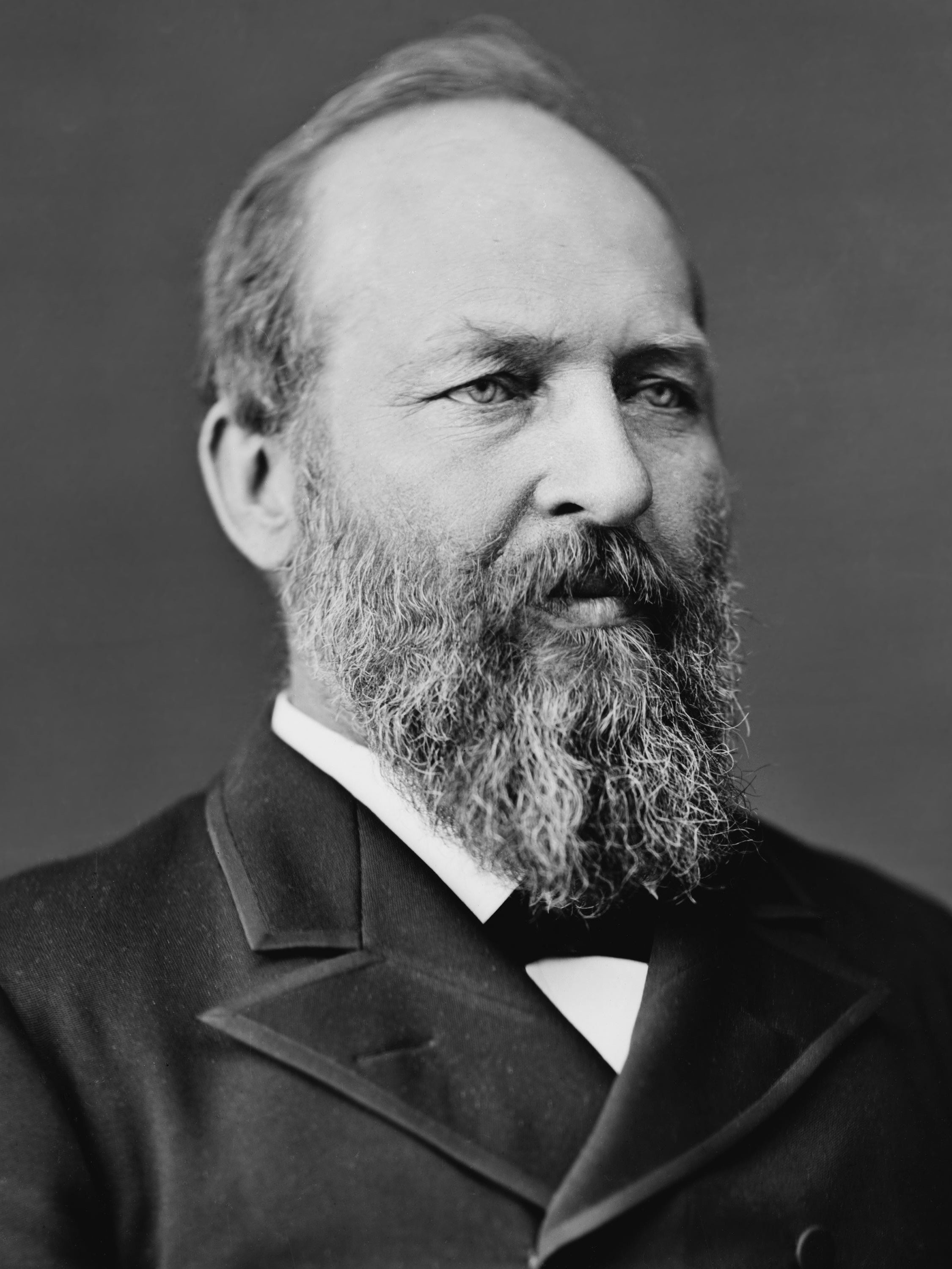
Nominee	Winfield Scott Hancock	James A. Garfield
Party	Democratic	Republican
Home state	Pennsylvania	Ohio
Running mate	William Hayden English	Chester A. Arthur
Electoral vote	8	0
Popular vote	93,706	78,515
Percentage	54.41%	45.59%
County results
Hancock
50–60%
60–70%
Garfield
40–50%
50–60%
President before election
Rutherford B. Hayes
Republican
Elected President
James A. Garfield
Republican

The 1880 United States presidential election in Maryland took place on November 2, 1880, as part of the 1880 United States presidential election. Voters chose eight representatives, or electors, to the Electoral College, who voted for president and vice president.

Maryland voted for the Democratic nominee, Winfield Scott Hancock, over the Republican nominee, James A. Garfield by a margin of 8.82%.

In this election, Maryland voted 8.89% more Democratic than the nation at large.

== Results ==
1880 United States presidential election in Maryland
Party	Candidate	Running mate	Popular vote		Electoral vote	
Party	Candidate	Running mate	Count	%	Count	%
Democratic	Winfield Scott Hancock of Pennsylvania	William Hayden English of Maryland	93,706	54.41%	8	100.00%
Republican	James Abram Garfield of Ohio	Chester Alan Arthur of New York	78,515	45.59%	0	0.00%
Total			172,221	100.00%	8	100.00%

=== Results by county ===
County	Winfield S. Hancock Democratic		James A. Garfield Republican		James B. Weaver Greenback		Margin		Total votes cast
County	#	%	#	%	#	%	#	%	Total votes cast
Allegany	3083	45.86%	3338	49.65%	302	4.49%	-255	-3.79%	6723
Anne Arundel	2754	52.92%	2450	47.08%	0	0.00%	304	5.84%	5204
Baltimore (City)	32672	58.19%	23338	41.57%	133	0.24%	9334	16.63%	56144
Baltimore (County)	7321	57.68%	5351	42.16%	21	0.17%	1970	15.52%	12693
Calvert	1100	54.67%	912	45.33%	0	0.00%	188	9.34%	2012
Caroline	1429	54.17%	1209	45.83%	0	0.00%	220	8.34%	2638
Carroll	3492	52.34%	3138	47.03%	42	0.63%	354	5.31%	6672
Cecil	2984	52.67%	2673	47.18%	9	0.16%	311	5.49%	5666
Charles	1686	47.08%	1889	52.75%	6	0.17%	-203	-5.67%	3581
Dorchester	2133	48.25%	2241	50.69%	47	1.06%	-108	-2.44%	4421
Frederick	5278	47.73%	5764	52.13%	16	0.14%	-486	-4.40%	11058
Garrett	1124	46.99%	1210	50.59%	58	2.42%	-86	-3.60%	2392
Harford	3016	54.92%	2476	45.08%	0	0.00%	540	9.83%	5492
Howard	1787	56.69%	1365	43.31%	0	0.00%	422	13.39%	3152
Kent	1969	51.52%	1853	48.48%	0	0.00%	116	3.04%	3822
Montgomery	3126	55.59%	2497	44.41%	0	0.00%	629	11.19%	5623
Prince George's	2713	50.17%	2672	49.41%	23	0.43%	41	0.76%	5408
Queen Anne's	2307	58.07%	1666	41.93%	0	0.00%	651	16.13%	3973
St. Mary's	1530	46.31%	1772	53.63%	2	0.06%	-242	-7.32%	3304
Somerset	1710	47.54%	1883	52.35%	4	0.11%	-173	-4.81%	3597
Talbot	2148	51.93%	1988	48.07%	0	0.00%	160	3.87%	4136
Washington	4030	49.06%	4080	49.67%	104	1.27%	-50	-0.61%	8214
Wicomico	2058	59.69%	1348	39.10%	42	1.22%	710	20.59%	3448
Worcester	2256	61.35%	1402	38.13%	19	0.52%	854	23.23%	3677
Total	93706	54.41%	78515	45.59%	828				173050

==== Counties that flipped from Republican to Democratic ====
- Calvert

==== Counties that flipped from Democratic to Republican ====
- Alleghany
- Charles
- Dorchester
- Somerset
- Washington

== See also ==
- United States presidential elections in Maryland
- 1880 United States presidential election
- 1880 United States elections
