= 1864 United States presidential election in Maryland =

- November 8, 1864
- Turnout: 10.61% of the total population ▼2.85 pp

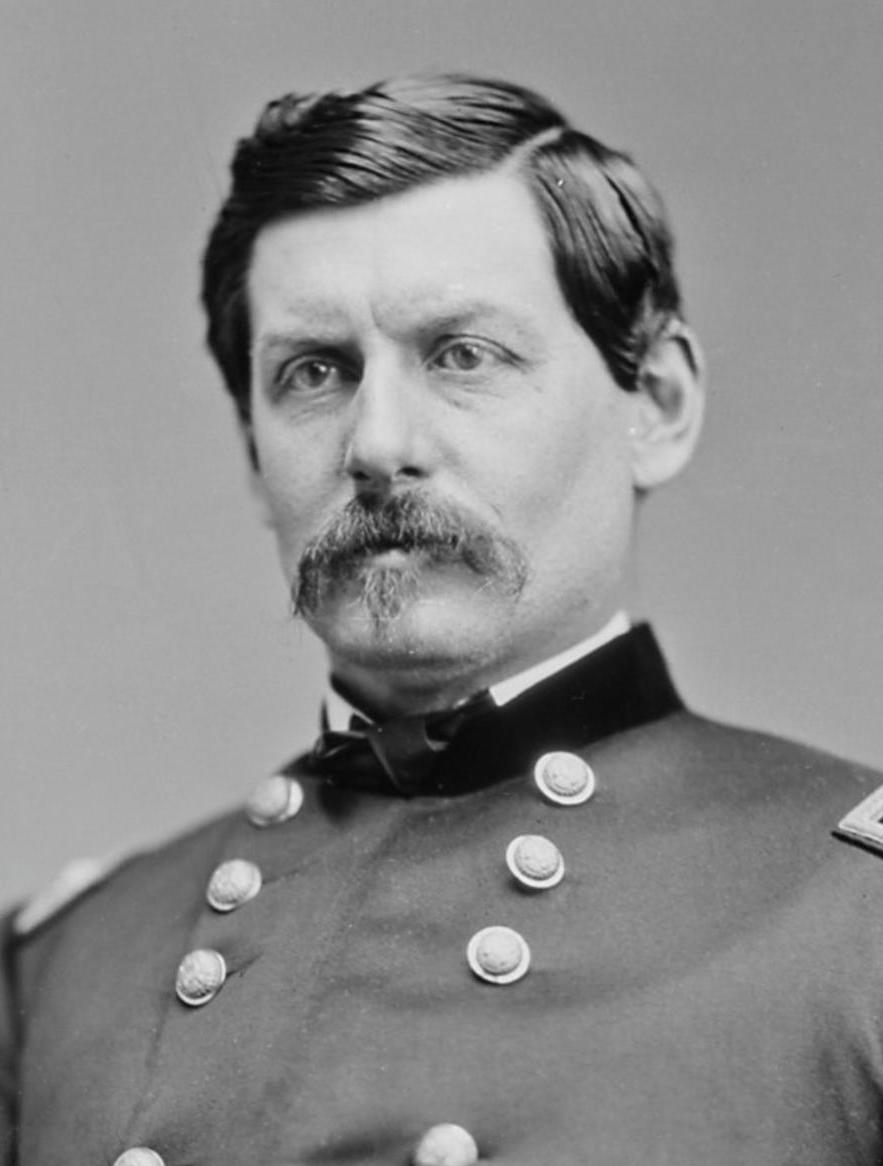
Nominee	Abraham Lincoln	George B. McClellan
Party	National Union	Democratic
Home state	Illinois	New Jersey
Running mate	Andrew Johnson	George H. Pendleton
Electoral vote	7	0
Popular vote	40,153	32,739
Percentage	55.09%	44.91%
County results
Lincoln
50–60%
60–70%
70–80%
80–90%
McClellan
50–60%
60–70%
70–80%
80–90%
90–100%
President before election
Abraham Lincoln
Republican
Elected President
Abraham Lincoln
National Union

The 1864 United States presidential election in Maryland took place on November 8, 1864, as part of the 1864 United States presidential election. State voters chose seven representatives, or electors, to the Electoral College, who voted for president and vice president.

Maryland was won by the National Union candidate incumbent Republican President Abraham Lincoln of Illinois and his running mate former Senator and Military Governor of Tennessee Andrew Johnson. They defeated the Democratic candidate 4th Commanding General of the United States Army George B. McClellan of New Jersey and his running mate Representative George H. Pendleton of Ohio. Lincoln won the state by a margin of 10.18%.

This was the last time that a Republican would win Maryland in a presidential election until William McKinley won it in 1896.

== Results ==
1864 United States presidential election in Maryland
Party	Candidate	Running mate	Popular vote		Electoral vote	
Party	Candidate	Running mate	Count	%	Count	%
National Union	Abraham Lincoln of Illinois	Andrew Johnson of Tennessee	40,153	55.09%	7	100.00%
Democratic	George B. McClellan of New Jersey	George H. Pendleton of Ohio	32,739	44.91%	0	0.00%
Total			72,892	100.00%	7	100.00%

=== Results by county ===
County	Abraham Lincoln National Union		George B. McClellan Democratic		Margin		Total votes cast
County	#	%	#	%	#	%	Total votes cast
Allegany	2455	55.23%	1990	44.77%	465	10.46%	4455
Anne Arundel	416	20.90%	1574	79.10%	-1158	-58.19%	1990
Baltimore (City)	14978	83.53%	2953	16.47%	12025	67.06%	17931
Baltimore (County)	2402	50.11%	2391	49.89%	11	0.23%	4793
Calvert	62	8.48%	669	91.52%	-607	-83.04%	731
Caroline	728	72.95%	270	27.02%	458	45.89%	998
Carroll	2056	52.17%	1885	47.83%	171	4.34%	3941
Cecil	1757	53.62%	1520	46.38%	237	7.23%	3277
Charles	27	2.73%	961	97.27%	-934	-94.53%	988
Dorchester	626	31.50%	1361	68.50%	-735	-36.99%	1987
Frederick	3553	60.68%	2302	39.32%	1251	21.37%	5885
Harford	1259	43.28%	1650	56.72%	-391	-13.44%	2909
Howard	579	42.67%	778	57.33%	-199	-14.66%	1357
Kent	413	24.55%	1269	75.45%	-856	-50.89%	1682
Montgomery	496	24.34%	1542	75.66%	-1046	-51.32%	2038
Prince George's	197	11.28%	1550	88.72%	-1353	-77.45%	1747
Queen Anne's	384	20.58%	1482	79.42%	-1098	-58.84%	1866
St. Mary's	99	9.12%	986	90.88%	-887	-81.75%	1085
Somerset	644	23.38%	2110	76.62%	-1466	-53.23%	2754
Talbot	578	68.40%	267	31.60%	311	36.80%	845
Washington	2980	68.01%	1402	31.99%	1578	36.01%	4382
Worcester	664	30.60%	1506	69.40%	-842	-38.80%	2170
Total	40153	55.09%	32739	44.91%	7414	10.18%	72892

==== Counties that flipped from Constitutional Union to Republican ====
- Alleghany
- Baltimore
- Caroline
- Carroll
- Cecil
- Frederick
- Washington

==== Counties that flipped from Constitutional Union to Democratic ====
- Anne Arundel
- Calvert
- Dorchester
- Harford
- Howard
- Kent
- Montgomery
- Queen Anne's
- Somerset

==== Counties that flipped from Democratic to Republican ====
- Baltimore (city)
- Talbot

== See also ==
- United States presidential elections in Maryland
- 1864 United States presidential election
- 1864 United States elections
