= 1968 United States presidential election in Maryland =

- November 5, 1968

Nominee	Hubert Humphrey	Richard Nixon	George Wallace
Party	Democratic	Republican	American Independent
Home state	Minnesota	New York (Note: Although he was born in California and he served as a U.S. senator from California, in 1968 Richard Nixon’s official state of residence was New York, because he moved there to practice law after his defeat in the 1962 California gubernatorial election. During his first term as president, Nixon re-established his residency in California. Consequently, most reliable reference books list Nixon's home state as New York in the 1968 election and his home state as California in the 1972 (and 1960) election.)	Alabama
Running mate	Edmund Muskie	Spiro Agnew	Marvin Griffin (Note: Though Curtis LeMay was Wallace's official running mate, Griffin's name was on the Maryland ballot.)
Electoral vote	10	0	0
Popular vote	538,310	517,995	178,734
Percentage	43.59%	41.94%	14.47%
County results
Humphrey
30–40%
40–50%
60–70%
Nixon
30–40%
40–50%
50–60%
60–70%
President before election
Lyndon B. Johnson
Democratic
Elected President
Richard Nixon
Republican

The 1968 United States presidential election in Maryland was held on November 5, 1968, as part of the 1968 United States presidential election. Maryland was won by Hubert Humphrey by a margin of 20,315 votes against Richard Nixon and by 359,576 votes against George Wallace.

Maryland was the home state of Republican vice presidential nominee Spiro Agnew, who was the sitting Governor of Maryland at the time of the election. Since Nixon lost his home state of New York, this, along with the 1916 election, is one of two times where the winning presidential and vice-presidential candidates lost both of their home states.

This is one of three elections between 1888 and 2000 in which the state voted for the national loser, along with 1948 and 1980. This was George Wallace's strongest state in which he won no counties, though he did finish ahead of Humphrey in Dorchester County.

In this election, Maryland voted 2.34% to the left of the nation at-large. As of 2026, this is the last election in which the winning candidate lost the home state of their running mate.

== Results ==
1968 United States presidential election in Maryland
Party	Candidate	Running mate	Votes	Percentage	Electoral votes
Democratic	Hubert Humphrey	Edmund Muskie	538,310	43.59%	10
Republican	Richard Nixon	Spiro Agnew	517,995	41.94%	0
American Independent	George Wallace	Marvin Griffin	178,734	14.47%	0

=== Results by county ===
County	Hubert Humphrey Democratic		Richard Nixon Republican		George Wallace American Independent		Margin		Total votes cast
County	#	%	#	%	#	%	#	%	Total votes cast
Allegany	13,227	41.45%	13,561	42.50%	5,122	16.05%	-334	-1.05%	31,910
Anne Arundel	25,381	32.70%	36,557	47.09%	15,687	20.21%	-11,176	-14.39%	77,625
Baltimore	80,798	36.89%	108,930	49.74%	29,283	13.37%	-28,132	-12.85%	219,011
Baltimore City	178,450	61.56%	80,146	27.65%	31,288	10.79%	98,304	33.91%	289,884
Calvert	2,032	37.29%	1,946	35.71%	1,471	27.00%	86	1.58%	5,449
Caroline	1,697	27.23%	3,120	50.07%	1,414	22.69%	-1,423	-22.84%	6,231
Carroll	4,658	23.73%	11,888	60.56%	3,085	15.71%	-7,230	-36.83%	19,631
Cecil	4,517	31.78%	6,462	45.46%	3,235	22.76%	-1,945	-13.68%	14,214
Charles	4,247	35.20%	4,645	38.50%	3,173	26.30%	-398	-3.30%	12,065
Dorchester	2,714	26.83%	4,183	41.36%	3,217	31.81%	966 (Note: In this county where Wallace ran second ahead of Humphrey, margin given is Nixon vote minus Wallace vote and percentage margin Nixon percentage minus Wallace percentage.)	-9.55%	10,114
Frederick	8,316	31.60%	13,649	51.87%	4,348	16.52%	-5,333	-20.27%	26,313
Garrett	1,933	28.54%	4,021	59.38%	818	12.08%	-2,088	-30.84%	6,772
Harford	9,914	32.30%	15,799	51.48%	4,978	16.22%	-5,885	-19.18%	30,691
Howard	5,752	31.08%	9,957	53.81%	2,796	15.11%	-4,205	-22.73%	18,505
Kent	2,243	35.41%	2,946	46.50%	1,146	18.09%	-703	-11.09%	6,335
Montgomery	92,026	48.08%	84,651	44.23%	14,726	7.69%	7,375	3.85%	191,403
Prince George's	71,524	40.26%	73,269	41.24%	32,867	18.50%	-1,745	-0.98%	177,660
Queen Anne's	1,969	31.99%	2,888	46.92%	1,298	21.09%	-919	-14.93%	6,155
Somerset	2,319	32.91%	2,829	40.14%	1,899	26.95%	-510	-7.23%	7,047
St. Mary's	3,280	35.75%	3,348	36.49%	2,547	27.76%	-68	-0.74%	9,175
Talbot	2,609	29.37%	4,902	55.18%	1,372	15.45%	-2,293	-25.81%	8,883
Washington	11,266	33.08%	16,050	47.13%	6,737	19.78%	-4,784	-14.05%	34,053
Wicomico	5,392	29.22%	8,707	47.18%	4,356	23.60%	-3,315	-17.96%	18,455
Worcester	2,046	27.43%	3,541	47.48%	1,871	25.09%	-1,495	-20.05%	7,458
Totals	538,310	43.59%	517,995	41.94%	178,734	14.47%	20,315	1.65%	1,235,039

==== Counties that flipped from Democratic to Republican ====
- Allegany
- Anne Arundel
- Baltimore (County)
- Caroline
- Carroll
- Cecil
- Charles
- Frederick
- Harford
- Howard
- Kent
- Prince George's
- Queen Anne's
- Somerset
- St. Mary's
- Talbot
- Washington
- Wicomico
- Worcester

== See also ==
- United States presidential elections in Maryland
- 1968 United States presidential election
- 1968 United States elections
