= 1888 United States presidential election in Maryland =

- November 6, 1888
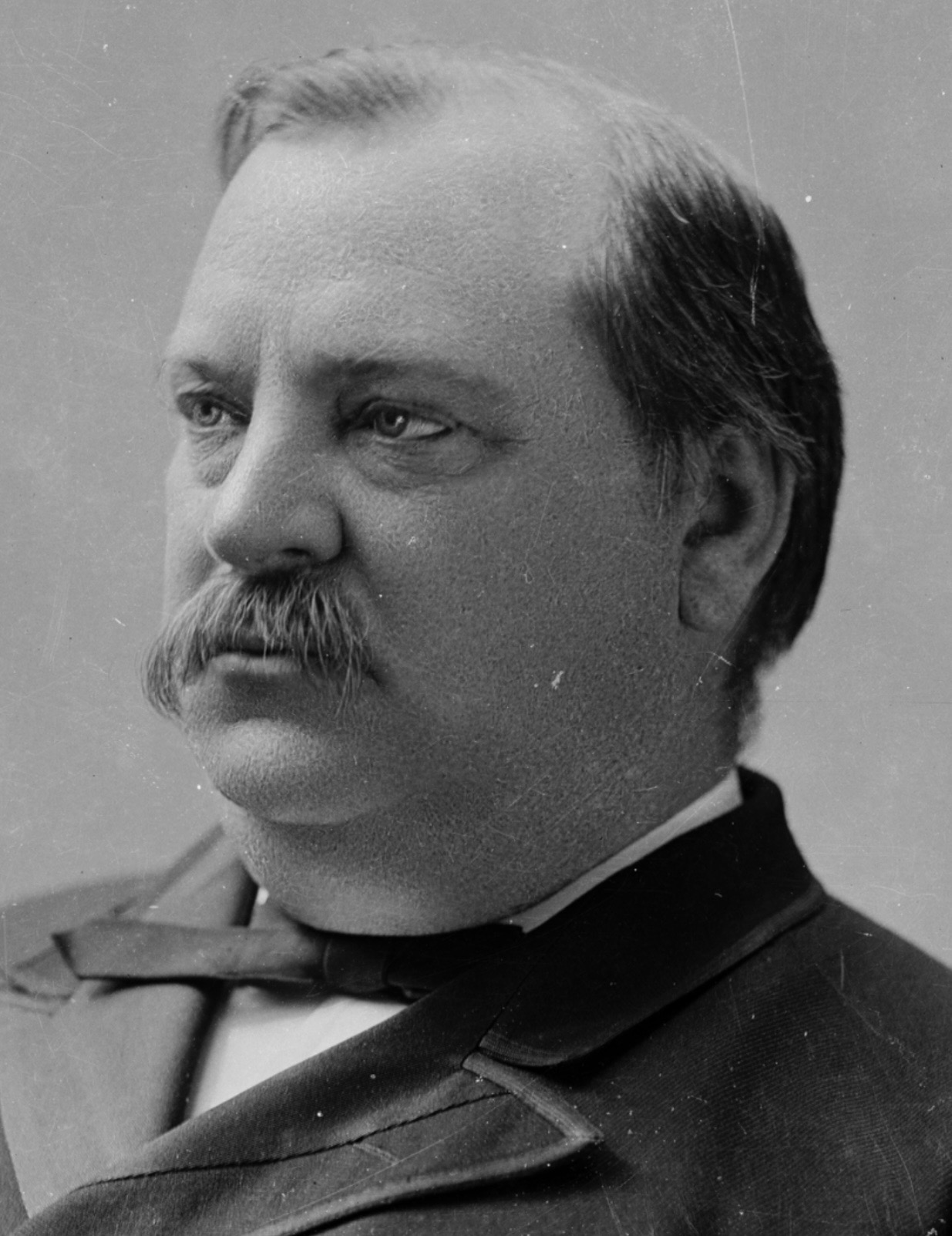

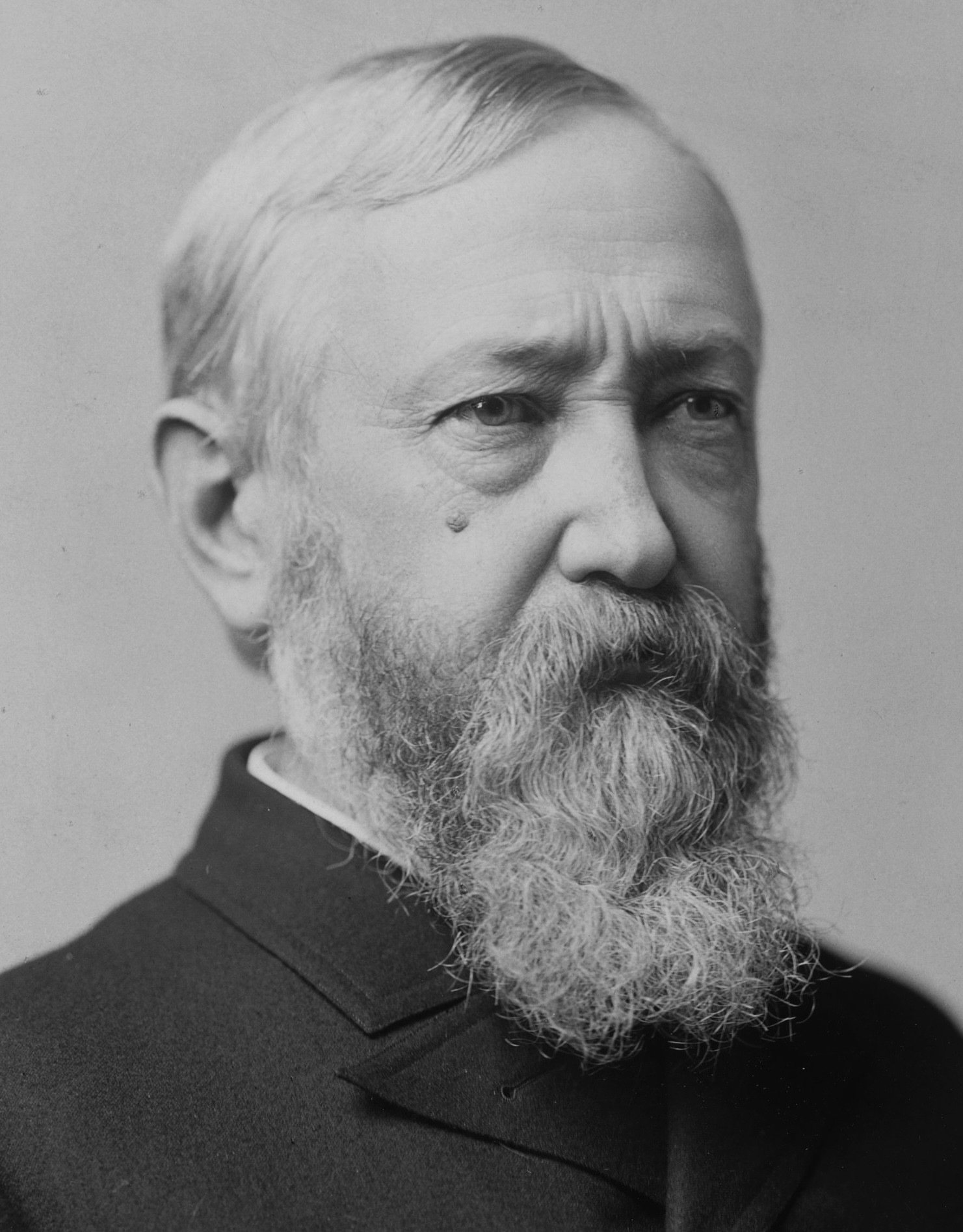
Nominee	Grover Cleveland	Benjamin Harrison
Party	Democratic	Republican
Home state	New York	Indiana
Running mate	Allen G. Thurman	Levi P. Morton
Electoral vote	8	0
Popular vote	106,188	99,986
Percentage	50.34%	47.40%
County results
Cleveland
40–50%
50–60%
Harrison
40–50%
50–60%
President before election
Grover Cleveland
Democratic
Elected President
Benjamin Harrison
Republican

The 1888 United States presidential election in Maryland took place on November 6, 1888, as part of the 1888 United States presidential election. Voters chose eight representatives, or electors, to the Electoral College, who voted for president and vice president.

Maryland voted for the Democratic nominee, incumbent President Grover Cleveland, over the Republican nominee, Benjamin Harrison. Cleveland won the state by a narrow margin of 2.94%. Despite the narrow margin, Maryland was still 2.11% more Democratic than the nation at large.

== Results ==
1888 United States presidential election in Maryland
Party	Candidate	Running mate	Popular vote		Electoral vote	
Party	Candidate	Running mate	Count	%	Count	%
Democratic	Grover Cleveland of New York (incumbent)	Allen Granberry Thurman of Ohio	106,188	50.34%	8	100.00%
Republican	Benjamin Harrison of Indiana	Levi Parsons Morton of New York	99,986	47.40%	0	0.00%
Prohibition	Clinton Bowen Fisk of New Jersey	John Anderson Brooks of Missouri	4,767	2.26%	0	0.00%
Total			210,941	100.00%	8	100.00%

=== Results by county ===
County	Grover Cleveland Democratic		Benjamin Harrison Republican		Clinton Bowen Fisk Prohibition		Margin		Total votes cast
County	#	%	#	%	#	%	#	%	Total votes cast
Allegany	3,299	43.76%	4,072	54.02%	167	2.22%	-773	-10.26%	7,538
Anne Arundel	2,979	48.96%	2,992	49.17%	114	1.87%	-13	-0.21%	6,085
Baltimore (City)	44,604	52.22%	39,559	46.31%	1,252	1.47%	5,045	5.91%	85,415
Baltimore (County)	6,464	53.28%	5,224	43.06%	443	3.65%	1240	10.22%	12,131
Calvert	933	43.42%	1,163	54.12%	53	2.47%	-230	-10.70%	2,149
Caroline	1,420	46.97%	1,490	49.29%	113	3.74%	-70	-2.32%	3,023
Carroll	3,772	49.53%	3,674	48.24%	170	2.23%	98	1.29%	7,616
Cecil	2,970	50.01%	2,879	48.48%	90	2.23%	91	1.53%	5,939
Charles	1,430	49.77%	1,431	49.81%	12	1.52%	-1	-0.04%	2,873
Dorchester	2,114	43.58%	2,602	53.64%	135	2.78%	-488	-10.06%	4,851
Frederick	5,385	47.07%	5,822	50.89%	233	2.04%	-437	-3.82%	11,440
Garrett	1,239	44.38%	1,533	54.91%	20	0.72%	-294	-10.53%	2,792
Harford	3,408	53.14%	2,830	44.13%	175	2.73%	578	9.01%	6,413
Howard	1,774	52.80%	1,521	45.27%	65	1.93%	253	7.53%	3,360
Kent	2,062	49.24%	2,037	48.64%	89	2.13%	25	0.60%	4,188
Montgomery	3,272	53.41%	2,712	44.27%	142	2.32%	560	9.14%	6,126
Prince George's	3,081	50.33%	3,019	49.32%	21	0.34%	62	1.01%	6,121
Queen Anne's	2,286	54.47%	1,738	41.41%	173	4.12%	548	13.06%	4,197
St. Mary's	1,551	46.20%	1,772	52.79%	173	1.01%	-221	-6.59%	3,357
Somerset	1,625	39.92%	2,072	50.90%	374	9.19%	-447	-10.98%	4,071
Talbot	2,120	47.01%	2,282	50.60%	108	2.39%	-162	-3.59%	4,510
Washington	4,254	46.71%	4,648	51.04%	205	2.25%	-394	-4.33%	9,107
Wicomico	2,210	56.86%	1,441	37.07%	236	6.07%	769	19.79%	3,887
Worcester	1,916	51.34%	1,473	39.47%	343	9.19%	443	11.87%	3,732
Total	106,188	50.34%	99,986	47.40%	4,767	2.26%	6,202	2.94%	210,941

==== Counties that flipped from Democratic to Republican ====
- Anne Arundel
- Caroline
- Talbot

== See also ==
- United States presidential elections in Maryland
- 1888 United States presidential election
- 1888 United States elections
