= Ivory, Maryland =

Unincorporated community in Maryland, United States

- Location in Maryland
- Coordinates: 39°16′32″N 76°59′3″W
- Country: United States of America
- State: Maryland
- County: Howard
- Time zone: UTC-5 (EST)
  - Summer (DST): UTC-4 (EDT)

Ivory is an unincorporated community located at the northwest tip of Howard County, Maryland, United States. It is located between modern Glenelg and West Friendship.

== History ==
The area is home to the estate of Enoch Selby who lived on the "Chapel of Ease" founded in 1750.

The Ivory post office opened for the community on 4 July 1886. The post office was operated by postmaster William V. Sheppard until 1918.

Sections of Ivory road remain, but most have been overlapped by Route 32. The path through town is now a segment of the Maryland Broadband Network awaiting lease.

== See also ==
- Isaacville, Maryland
