= James N. Robey =

American politician (born 1941)

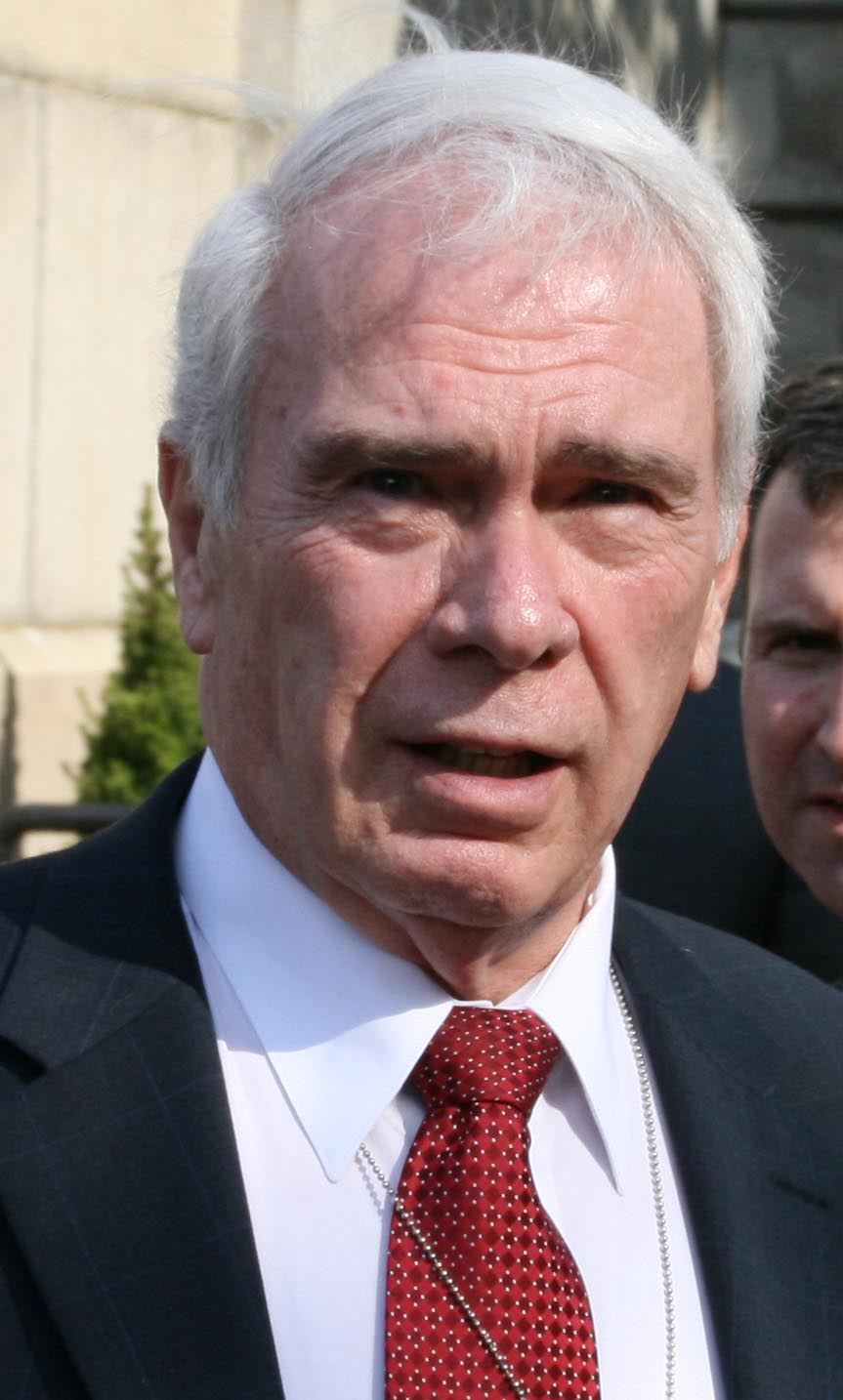

Member of the Maryland Senate from the 13th district
- In office January 10, 2007 – January 14, 2015
- Preceded by: Sandra Schrader
- Succeeded by: Guy Guzzone

Majority Leader of the Maryland Senate
- In office September 1, 2013 – January 14, 2015
- Preceded by: Robert Garagiola
- Succeeded by: Catherine Pugh

7th County Executive of Howard County
- In office December 1998 – December 4, 2006
- Preceded by: Charles Ecker
- Succeeded by: Ken Ulman

Personal details
- Born: January 18, 1941 (age 85) Baltimore, Maryland, U.S.
- Party: Democratic
- Education: University of Maryland, University College (BA), Hood College (MA)
- Police career
- Department: Howard County Police Department
- Service years: 1966-1998
- Rank: Chief of Police

James N. Robey Jr. (born January 18, 1941), an American Democratic politician, was a Maryland State Senator from January 10, 2007, to January 14, 2015. He was the Senate Majority Leader from 2013 until he retired in January 2015.

== Background ==
Born January 18, 1941, in Baltimore, Maryland, Robey was raised in Daniels, Maryland, a small mill town in Howard County that was once located on the banks of the Patapsco River.

Robey graduated from Howard High School in Ellicott City, Maryland, in 1959. His high school principal, Omar J. Jones, was Howard County's first county executive. Robey earned a bachelor's degree in criminal justice from the University of Maryland University College (UMUC) in 1979. He also has master's degree in administrative management from Hood College in Frederick, Maryland, and has completed several training programs at the FBI National Academy in Quantico, Virginia.

His son, Wayne Robey, became the clerk of the Howard County Circuit Court when Margaret Rappaport retired in 2012.

== Career ==
Robey joined the Howard County Police Department in 1966 and was promoted to major by 1981. He was appointed by Charles I. Ecker to Chief of Police in 1991, replacing Frederick Chaney. He retired from the police force in 1998 to run for office and was elected as Howard County Executive in 1998 and 2002.

In 2006, Robey campaigned as a Democrat to represent the 13th district in the Maryland State Senate and won with 56% of the vote against Republican incumbent Sandra Schrader. In September 2013, he was chosen to replace State Senator Robert Garagiola as Senate Majority Leader. Robey retired from the Maryland State Senate on January 14, 2015.

== Recognition ==
Robey was recognized by his alma mater, University of Maryland University College (UMUC), as the 2002 "Distinguished Alumnus". In 2007, the James N. Robey Public Safety Training Facility, a training facility used by the Howard County police and fire departments, was dedicated in his honor.

According to Vote Smart, an independent, nonprofit research organization, in 2011, Robey received a performance evaluation rating of 92% from Progressive Maryland, a nonprofit, liberal advocacy group that rates legislators based on their positions on social, liberal, and family-related issues. In 2008, he received a score of 97%.

== Election history ==
| Year | Office | Election | Subject | Party | Votes | % | Opponent | Party | Votes | % | Opponent | Party | Votes | % |
|---|---|---|---|---|---|---|---|---|---|---|---|---|---|---|
| 1998 | Howard County Executive | General | James N. Robey | Democratic | 43,322 | 55% | Dennis Schrader | Republican | 35,081 | 44% | | | | |
| 2006 | Maryland Senate District 13 | General | James N. Robey | Democratic | 24,354 | 56.1% | Sandra Schrader | Republican | 19,021 | 43.8% | | | | |
