= HCSO =

HCSO may refer to:

- Harris County, Texas Sheriff's Office
- Hernando County, Florida Sheriff's Office
- Hennepin County Sheriff's Office
- Howard County Sheriff's Office
- Hillsborough County, Florida Sheriff's Office
- The Hungarian Central Statistical Office
