= Walt Smallwood =

American baseball player

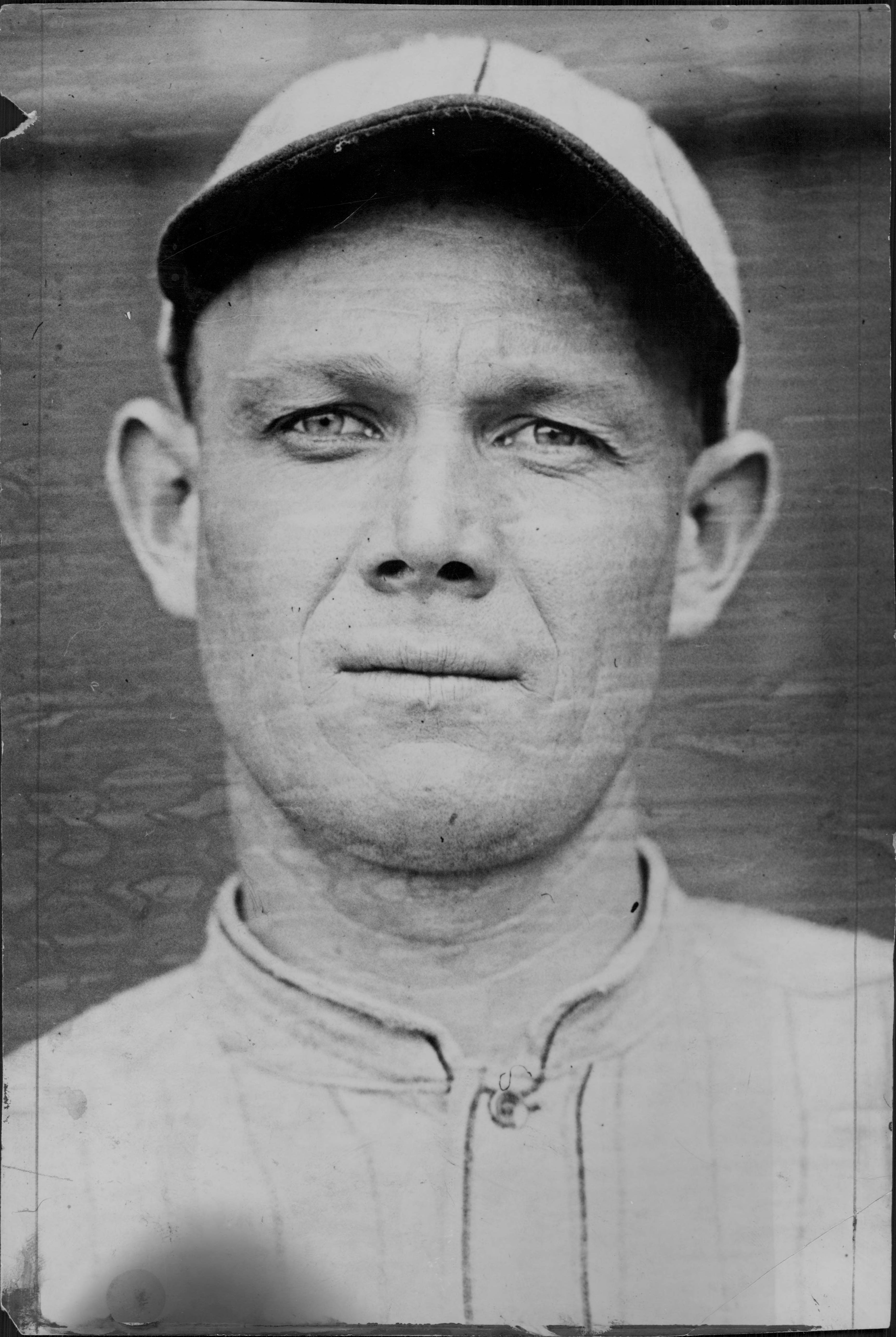
- Pitcher
- Born: April 24, 1893; Dayton, Maryland, U.S.
- Died: April 29, 1967 (aged 74); Baltimore, Maryland, U.S.
- Batted: Right Threw: Right

MLB debut
- September 19, 1917, for the New York Yankees

Last MLB appearance
- August 15, 1919, for the New York Yankees

MLB statistics
- Win–loss record: 0–0
- Earned run average: 4.56
- Strikeouts: 7
- Stats at Baseball Reference

Teams
- New York Yankees (1917, 1919)

Walter Clayton Smallwood (April 24, 1893 – April 29, 1967) was an American professional baseball pitcher from 1913 to 1931. He won 192 games in the minor leagues and also played two seasons in Major League Baseball for the New York Yankees. Smallwood was 6 feet, 2 inches tall and weighed 190 pounds (86 kg).

== Career ==
Smallwood was born in Dayton, Maryland, in 1893. He started his professional baseball career in 1913. The following season, he joined the South Atlantic League's Savannah Colts and compiled a win–loss record of 17–6. Smallwood then went 8–16 in 1915 to lead the league in losses. He moved to the International League in 1916 and went 14–19 there to lead that league in losses, too.

Smallwood rebounded in 1917, going 21–15, and he made his major league debut in September with the New York Yankees. In two MLB relief appearances that year, he did not allow a run. Smallwood was out of professional baseball in 1918. He returned to the Yankees in 1919 and relieved in six games, all of which the Yankees lost.

For the next few years, Smallwood bounced around the minor leagues. He had stints in the Pacific Coast League, American Association, International League, and Eastern League from 1920 to 1927 and pitched over 150 innings in most of those seasons. He finished his playing career with the Western League's Pueblo Braves, which he also managed, in 1931.

Smallwood won 192 games and lost 201 during his 17-season career in professional baseball. He died in Baltimore, Maryland on April 29, 1967 and was buried in New Cathedral Cemetery.
