= Maloney's General Store =

Maloney's General Store can refer to:

- Maloney's General Store in Skykomish, Washington
- Maloney's General Store in Dayton, Maryland
