= Norman E. Moxley =

American politician and businessperson (1905–1995)

- Born: January 17, 1905; Maryland
- Died: November 15, 1995 (aged 90); Bon Secours Nursing Center Ellicott City, Maryland
- Political party: Democratic
- Board member of: Howard County Commissioner
- Spouse: Evelyn Richarts
- Children: Marilyn Elaine Moxley, Eleanor Moxley (Breeden), Norman Ezekiel Moxley Jr (1926–2010), Robert R. Moxley
- Relatives: Russell E Moxley, Janie Stromberg

Norman E. Moxley (1905–1995) was an American politician and businessman in Howard County, Maryland

== Early life ==
Norman Moxley was born in 1905. He grew up on his family's 800 acre farm near the prison in Ellicott City, Maryland. Early jobs included being a blacksmith and later founding a plastering company in the 1920s. He married Evelyn Richarts in 1926. In 1944 Moxley was an airplane spotter assigned to post 25A on Columbia Pike. In 1949, he ran for one of the three County Commissioner positions and won. The next year he was the chairman.

== Commissioner – Councilman ==
Moxley's first tenure as a Howard County Commissioner was in 1949. He became president of the board of commissioners becoming the equivalent of the modern-day County Executive. In 1951 he became the Chairman of the Planning Commission In 1952, Moxley was opposed to new housing, being quoted as saying "each new house is a liability to the county". He felt that commercial development provided more revenue to the county with less infrastructure and service burdens. In 1953, Moxley approved taking a $514,000 state loan for new school construction, with future commissioner Charles E. Miller chosen for site purchases. During the November 1954 election, Moxley's brother Howard County Police Chief E. Russell Moxley and Max A. Rappaport were charged with electioneering, requiring the Maryland State police to intercede, but all charges were later dropped in a Howard County Court. In 1958, while in office, Moxley patented (US 2,860,753) a coin-operated machine for collecting parking fines. The machine was intended to rapidly issue a ticket and receive payment on the spot "to relieve the charged with the hassle of driving to the police station to pay the fine". Moxley served as chairman until 1962.

In 1962, Moxley attempted to run for a fourth term, but was rejected by Democrats to run in the position. He ran an unsuccessful bid as an independent, losing to Charles E. Miller, J. Hubert Black, and David W. Force.

In 1966, Moxley attempted to run again for the new position of Howard County Council. He won the primary with 3031 votes on a slate with J. Thomas Nissel, losing the general to a sweep of Republican incumbents. He ran again in 1968 on a United ticket.

Norman Moxley kept family ties within the Howard County Council. In 1966, his niece's husband Ridgley Jones was elected to a seat on the county council.

== Businessman – Land Developer ==
In 1930, Moxley opened his first Acme retail store. He later founded a plastering company that operated until 1949. In 1945, he developed his first shopping center, The Arbutis Shopping Center. His second shopping center was in Glen Burnie with an Acme anchor.

In July 1955 Moxley formed the Normandy Development company, and subdivided his own land in Howard County on Highland Road and Rogers Avenue to build the Normandy Heights housing development in Ellicott City, Maryland. In 1956, Moxley teamed with family members James R. Moxley Sr., Robert R. Moxley and James R. Moxley Jr. forming Normandy Development Company to create Normandy Shopping Center, Howard County's first shopping center which opened on September 1, 1961. "Normandy" was a spin on Norman's name. The shopping center and Normandy housing development were built on the 800 acres of farmland that had been in the family since the 1800s.

Moxley also was on the Farm Bureau, President of the Rotary Club, member of the Planning Committee of the National Association of County Commissioners, Baltimore Regional Planning Council and Howard County Planning Commission. He served on the board of officers in the Mt Etna Corporation. His brother-in-law's brother (Paul Stromberg) published 13 newspapers spanning Howard County to Anne Arundel, Baltimore, and Carroll County.

=== Other ===
The Moxley family occupied many positions in the Howard County Government. Norman Moxley's brother, James R. Moxley Sr. started with the school board as a bus contractor in Ellicott City in 1939, bidding against Charles E. Miller. He later sold a prime parcel to James Rouse as Robert Moxley assembled properties for the planned community development of Columbia, Maryland.

In 1972 Moxley was the chairman of the public works board. His county approved purchases of gasoline from Councilman Charles E. Miller's Ellicott City business caught press attention at the time.

Moxley's son Norman Moxley Jr. was one of the first users of the Rain Dream Hill facility founded by Arc of Howard County. Moxley died of stroke complications in 1995 at the age of 90 at the Bon Secours Nursing Center.
