= Howard County Police Department =

Law enforcement agency of Howard County, Maryland

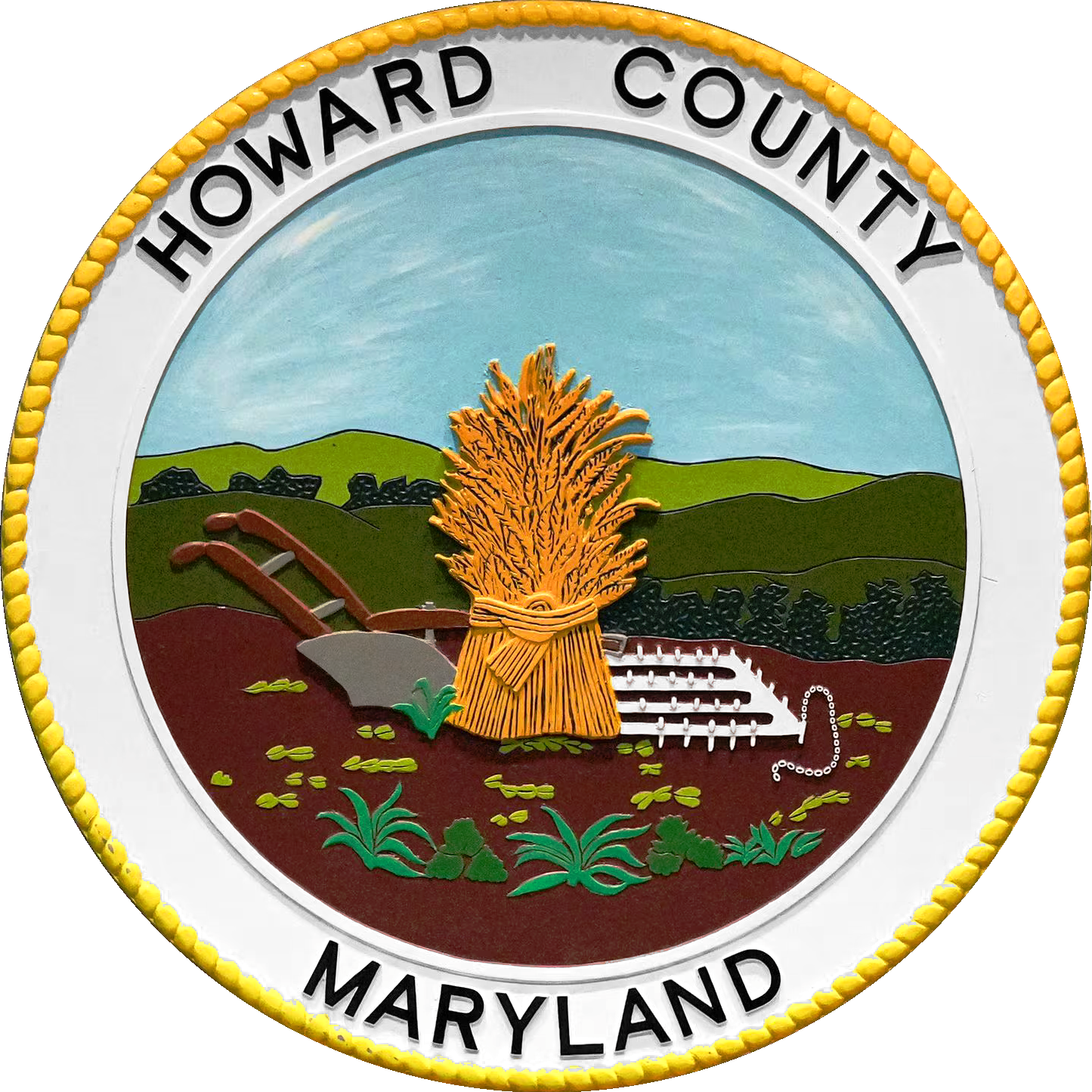
- Seal of Howard County, Maryland

- Flag of Howard County, Maryland
- Abbreviation: HCPD
- Motto: Pro bono publico For public good

Agency overview
- Formed: 1952; 74 years ago
- Annual budget: FY15 General Fund Budget: $102,451,815

Jurisdictional structure
- Operations jurisdiction: Howard County, Maryland, U.S.
- Map of Howard County Police Department's jurisdiction
- Area: 254 square miles (660 km^{2})
- Population: 334,529 (2021)
- General nature: Local civilian police

Operational structure
- Headquarters: George Howard Building, 3430 Courthouse Drive, Ellicott City, Maryland, 21043; 39.275421°N 76.805920°W
- Sworn members: 509
- Civilians: 241
- Agency executive: Gregory Der, Chief Of Police

Facilities
- Districts: 2
- K9 teams: 9

Website
- Howard County Police Department

The Howard County Police Department (HCPD) is the primary law enforcement agency of Howard County, Maryland.

== History ==
From the founding of Howard County until 1894, the county's law enforcement responsibilities were handled by the Howard County Sheriff's Office (HCSO). In 1894, the Howard County Commissioners were granted the power to appoint local police officers in designated jurisdictions inside the county to aid in law enforcement duties. In 1904, the second district police force was formed with Julius Wosch as the sole officer. Wosch was paid using a fee system of 15 cents for any paper served, and 25 cents for a dog tax with a penalty of pet destruction for non-payment. Wosch doubled the staff in 1935 paying Edgar Russel Moxley from his own earnings as an assistant. In 1938, the Maryland State Police expanded police services with a station on the site of the historic Spurrier's Tavern in Waterloo.

The Howard County Police Department (HCPD) in its current form was founded in 1952, by Chapter 496 of the Acts of 1894, in sections 17.200 through 17.206 of the Howard County code.

After the founding of the HCPD, Howard County Commissioner Norman E. Moxley appointed his brother Edgar Russell Moxley chief, with four officers and a population of 20,000. A single 1952 ford was purchased for patrols. Moxley was followed by Fred L Ford, who served until December 1962. By 1963, Howard County had 21 police staff employed, serving 44,000 (2095 to one ratio). The County placed a goal of 1370 to one ratio by 1975. Jack L. Larrimore served as police chief from 1963 to 1969. Counter-insurrection training was added in 1965, and the Howard County Interracial Commission recommended hiring of African American officers to reduce countywide racial tensions in 1967. Larrimore ran for County Executive in 1969, against Omar J. Jones who did not renew his commission. In 1971, the force increased to 68 with six day weeks implemented to handle crime sprees in the Columbia development.

Garland R Walters served in 1972, a year where recorded crime rates went up 50% more per year as the Rouse Company development Columbia expanded. Robert Matthew was appointed by executive Edward L. Cochran for a period from 1974 to 1978. Paul H. Rappaport served from 1979 to 1987. James N. Robey was appointed Chief of the 295 officer force by Charles I. Ecker replacing Frederick W. Chaney in 1991. He retired in 1998 to run for County Executive. Matthews was convicted for raiding his mother's estate and sentenced to 1 year in jail in 2001. Wayne Livesay retired in 2006 to run for County Council. Bill McMahon was appointed to Chief by County Executive Ken Ulman, retiring in 2014 at the end of Ulman's term and replaced by 30-year veteran Gary Gardner in July 2014. Lisa Myers was appointed Chief by County Executive Dr. Calvin Ball on February 13, 2019. She was the county's first African-American and female Police Chief. After Chief Myers retired in December 2021, County Executive Ball named Gregory Der as the next Chief of Police.

=== Authority ===
All HCPD officers are fully certified, sworn law enforcement officials. The authority originates with an act of legislation performed by the Maryland General Assembly. The agency itself is also nationally accredited through the Commission on Accreditation for Law Enforcement Agencies, which gives accreditations to agencies who meet their national standards.

== Organization ==
The current chief of police is Greg Der (retired, new HCPD Chief soon to be known).

The HCPD divides the county into two districts, northern and southern. The agency has the following sections:

- Patrol
- Community Outreach Sections (Community Liaison, Crisis Intervention, C.O.P.S. Victim Assistance)
- Youth Division
- Tactical section
- K9 Section
- Auxiliary and Mount Patrol volunteers
- Traffic Management
- Forensic Science Division
- Violent Crimes Division
- Vice and Narcotics Division
- Special Investigation Division
- Emergency Services Unit
- 9-1-1 Communications Division
- Animal Control

== Rank structure ==
The Howard County Police Department operates as a military organization using these sworn personnel ranks:

Title	Insignia
Chief of Police	
Deputy Chief	
Captain	
Lieutenant	
Sergeant	
Corporal	
Police First Class	
Police Officer	

== See also ==
- List of law enforcement agencies in Maryland
