= Howard County, Maryland =

County in Maryland, United States

- County
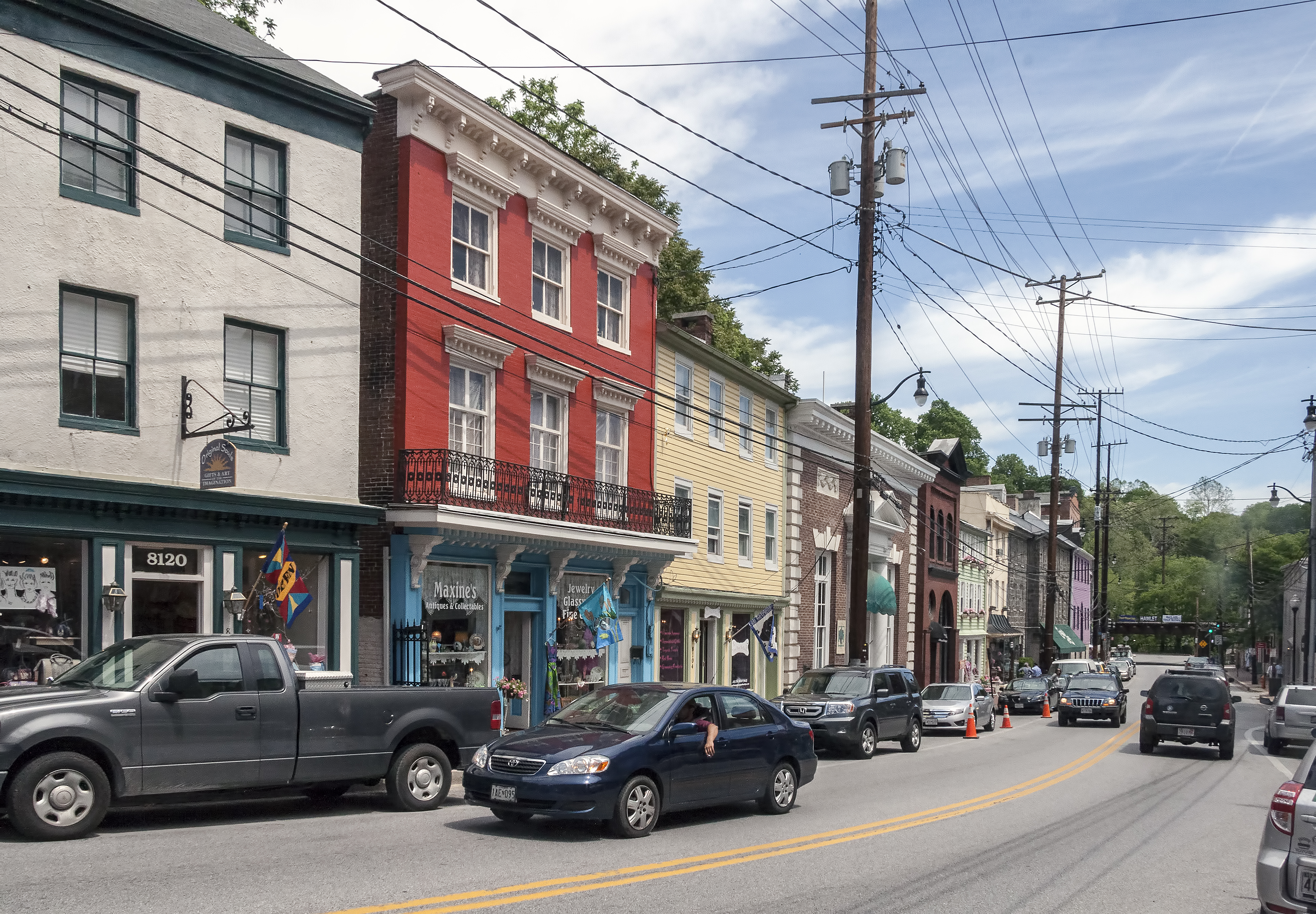
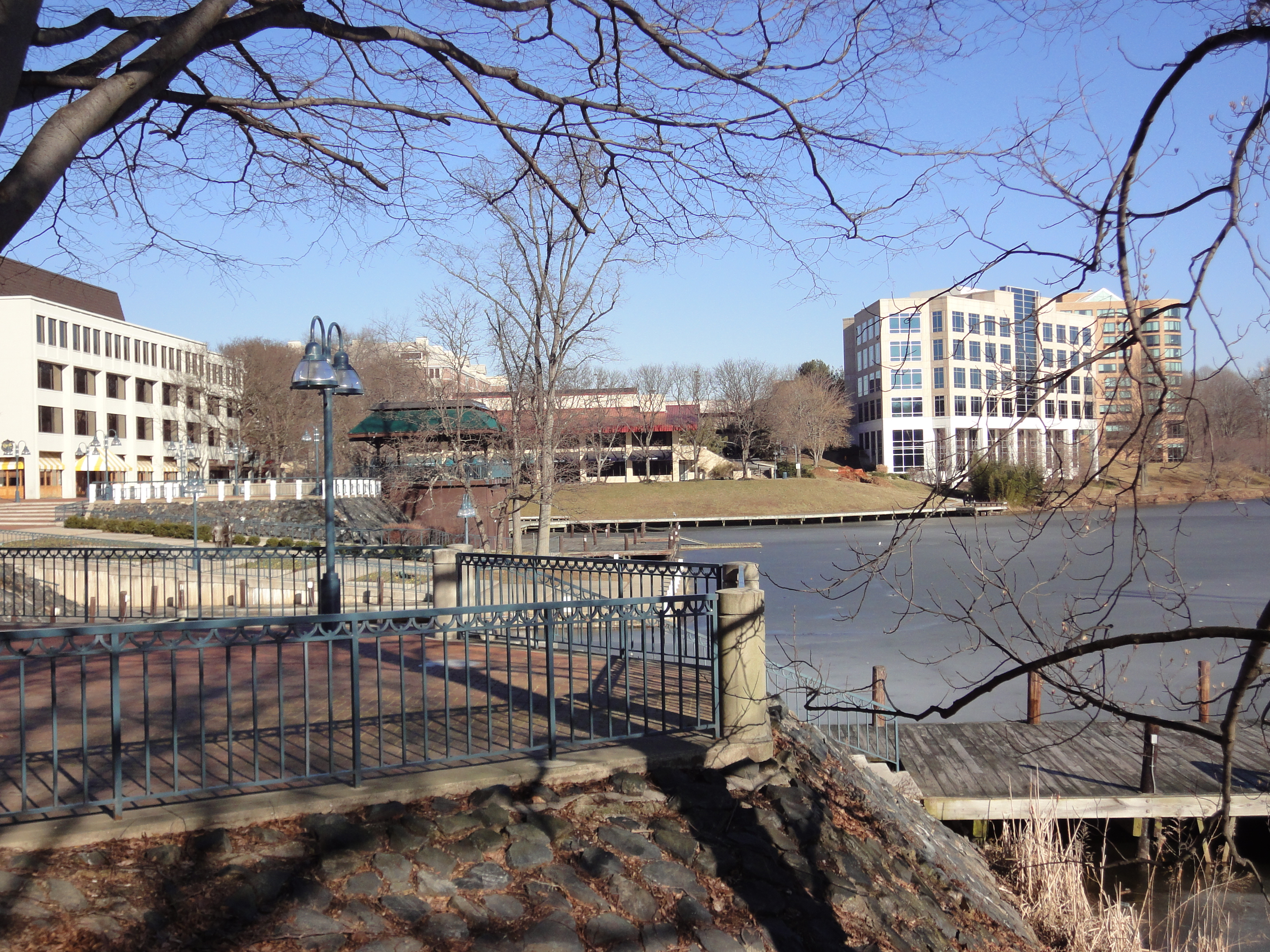
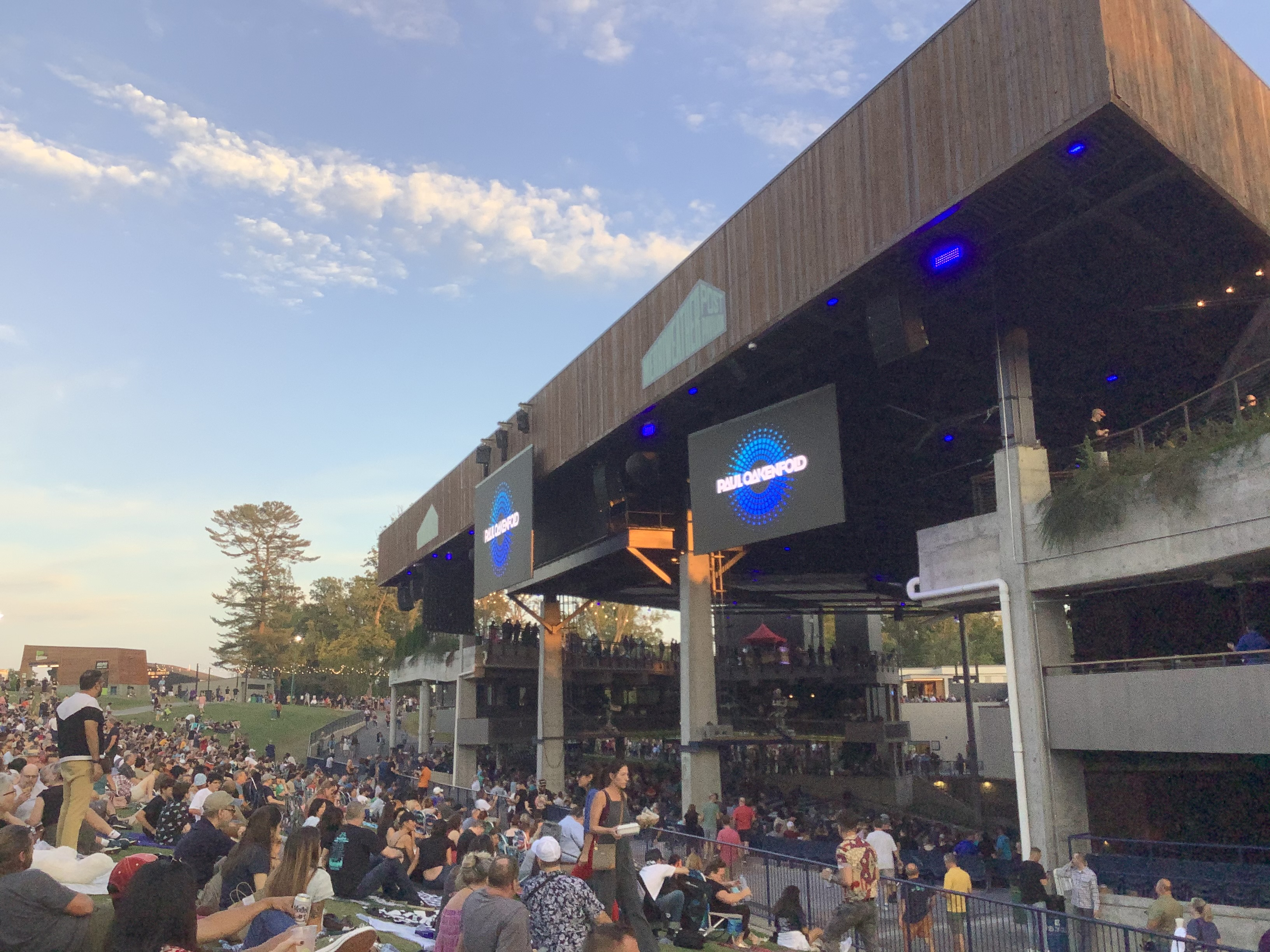
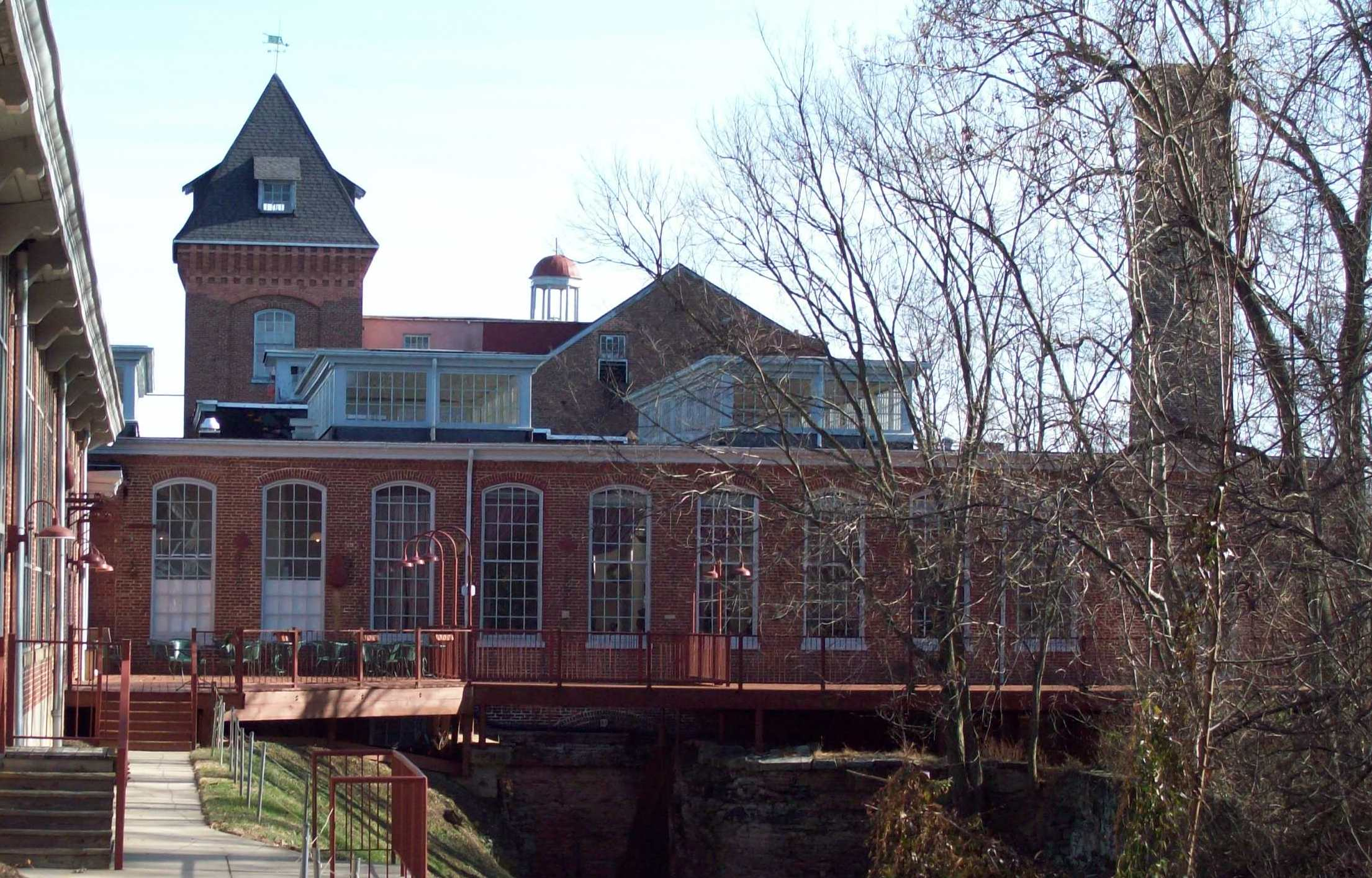
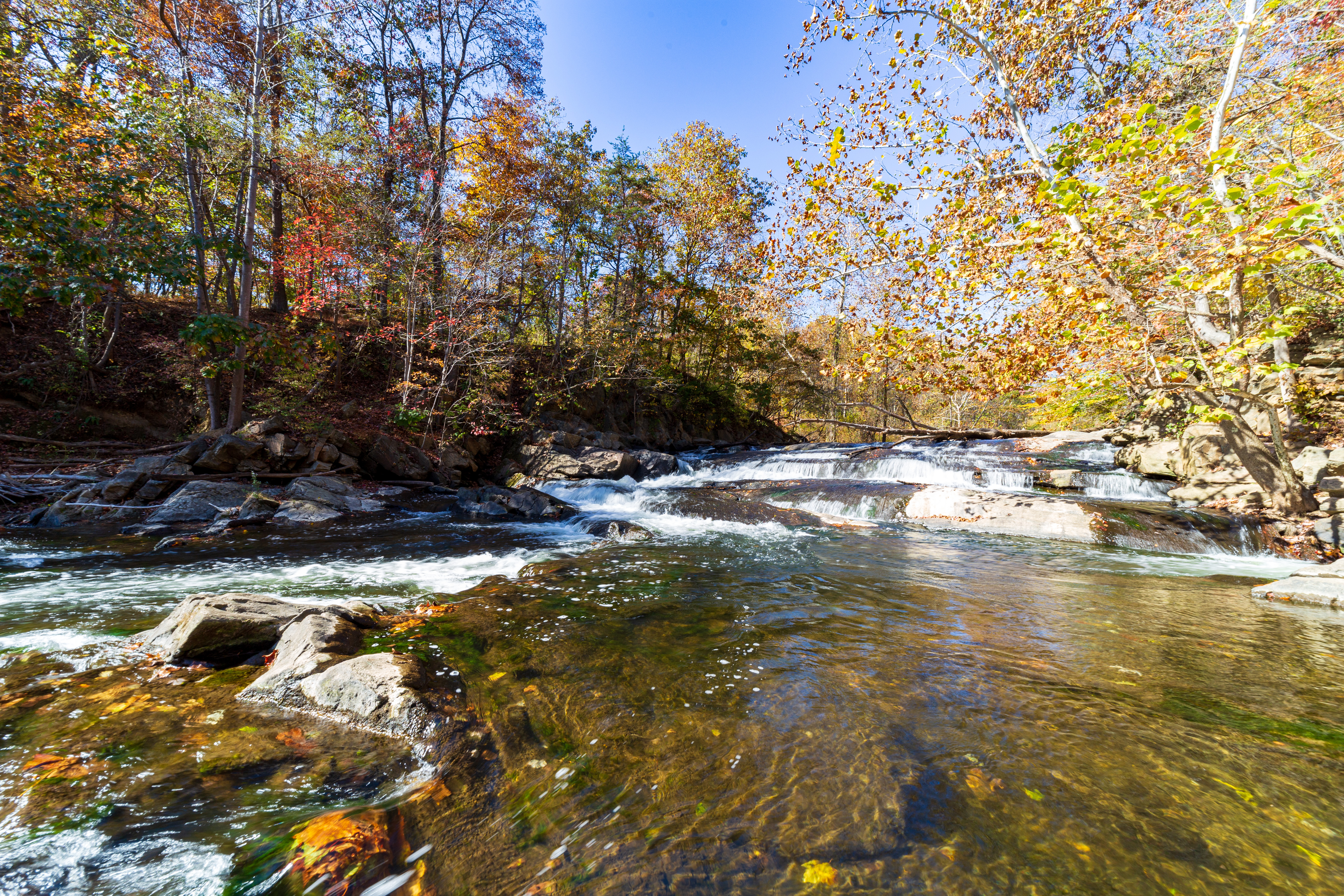
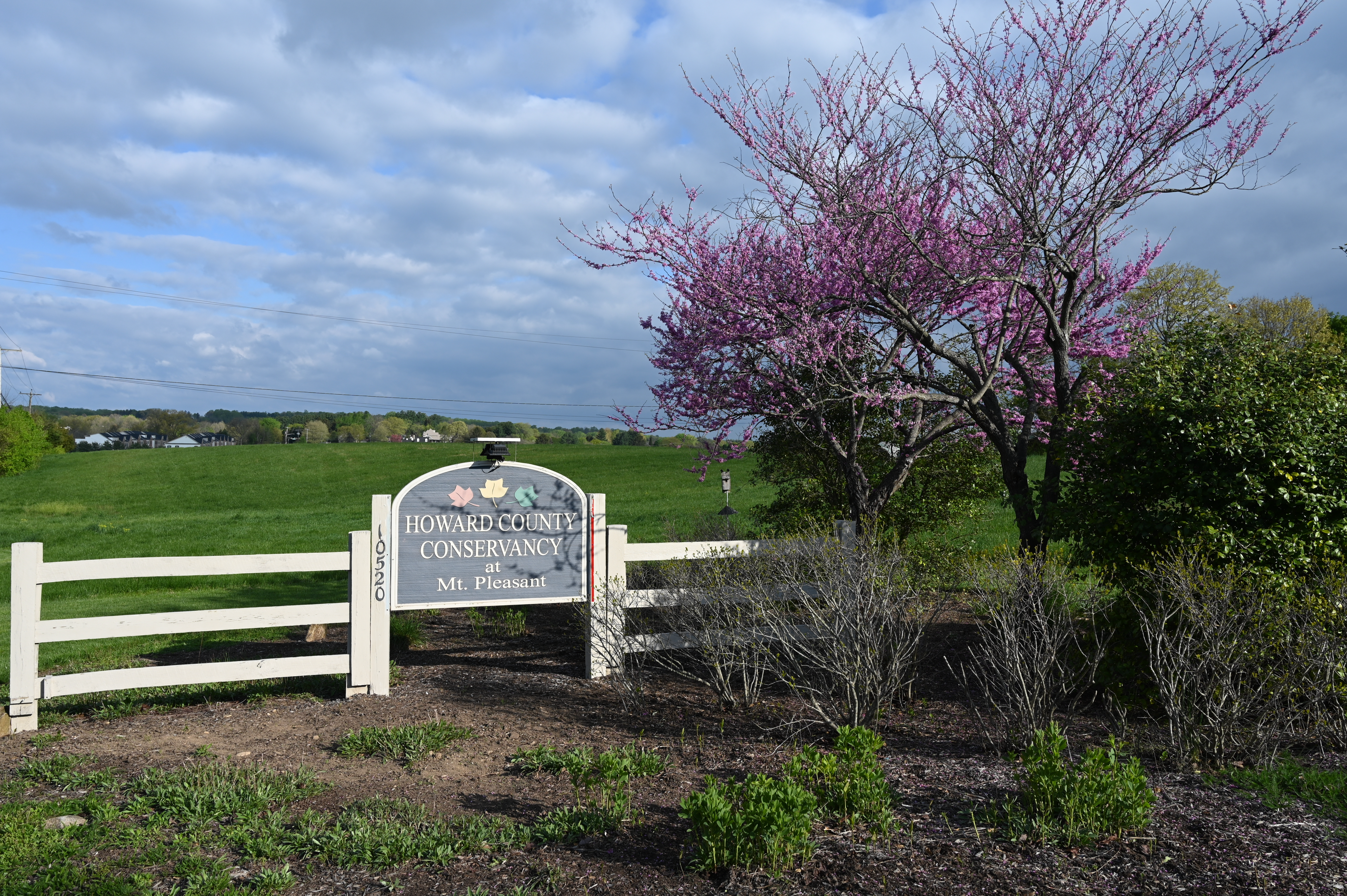
- Clockwise: Main Street in Ellicott City, Merriweather Post Pavilion in Columbia, McKeldin Rapids in Patapsco Valley State Park, Howard County Conservatory, Savage Mill, Town Center in Columbia.

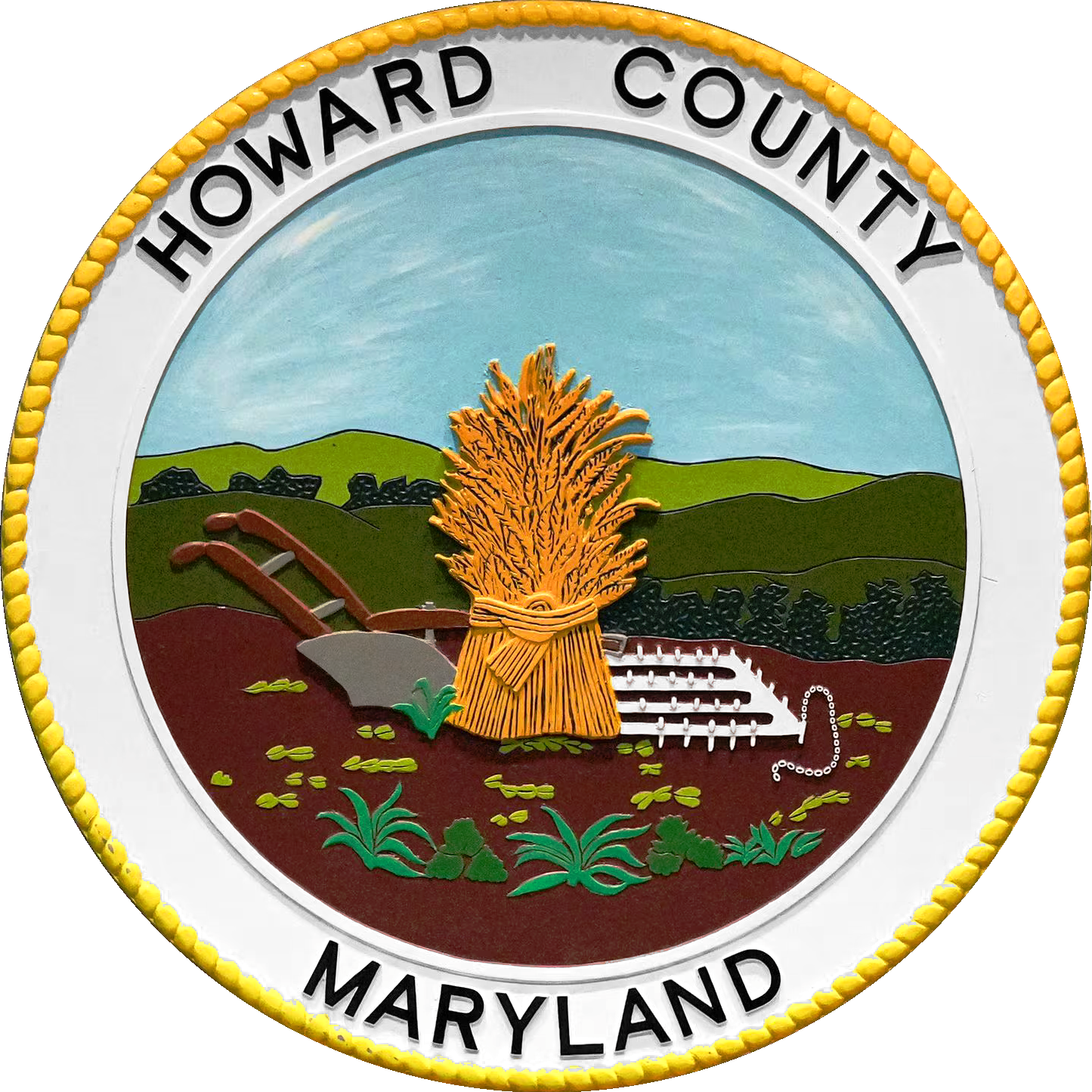
- Flag Seal Logo
- Nickname: "HoCo"
- Location within the U.S. state of Maryland
- Coordinates: 39°15′N 76°56′W
- Country: United States
- State: Maryland
- Founded: May 13, 1838
- Named for: John Eager Howard
- Seat: Ellicott City
- Largest community: Columbia

Area
  - Total: 253 sq mi (660 km^{2})
  - Land: 251 sq mi (650 km^{2})
  - Water: 2.7 sq mi (7.0 km^{2}) 1.0%

Population (2020)
  - Total: 332,317
  - Estimate (2025): 339,183 ▲
  - Density: 1,320/sq mi (511/km^{2})
- Time zone: UTC−5 (Eastern)
  - Summer (DST): UTC−4 (EDT)
- Congressional districts: 3rd
- Website: howardcountymd.gov

Howard County is located in the U.S. state of Maryland. As of the 2020 census, the population is 334,529. Since there are no incorporated municipalities, there is no incorporated county seat either. Therefore, its county seat is the unincorporated community of Ellicott City. Howard County is part of the Baltimore metropolitan area.

The county is home to Columbia, a planned community between Baltimore and Washington, D.C. with a population of approximately 100,000, founded in 1967.

Howard County is frequently cited for its affluence, quality of life, and excellent schools. Its estimated 2020 median household income of $124,042 (~$151,821 in 2025) makes it one of the wealthiest counties in the US. Many of the most affluent communities in the area, such as Clarksville, Dayton, Glenelg, Glenwood, and West Friendship, are located along the Route 32 corridor in Howard County. The main population center of Columbia/Ellicott City is regularly ranked in Money magazine's Top 10 "Best Places to Live". According to data from the U.S. Census Bureau, Howard County ranks fourth in the nation for educational attainment, with an estimated 63.6% of residents 25 and over holding a bachelor's degree or higher. In 2022, the Howard County Public School System was ranked the best school district in Maryland.

In 2010, the center of population of Maryland was located in the Howard County town of Jessup.

== Etymology ==
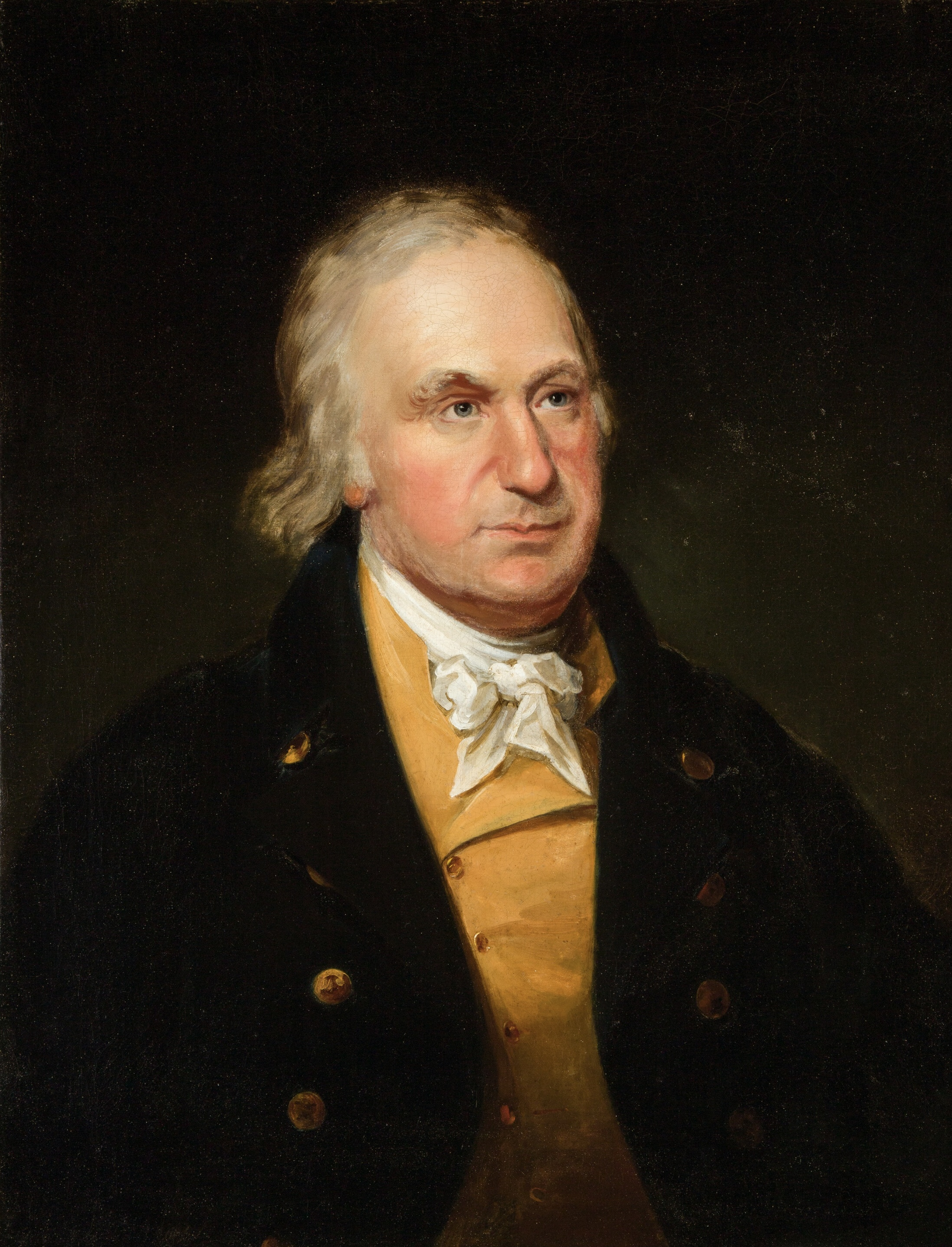
Howard County is named for Governor John Eager Howard

The name of the county honors Colonel John Eager Howard, an officer in the "Maryland Line" of the Continental Army in the American Revolutionary War, commander notably at the Battle of Cowpens in South Carolina in 1781, among others. He was the fifth governor of Maryland, serving from 1788 to 1791.

== History ==
1860 Martenet's Map of Howard County, Maryland

Prior to the European colonization of what is now Howard County in the 1600s, the area served as farming and hunting grounds for Indigenous peoples including the Piscataway and Susquehannock peoples. The Maryland Historical Trust has documented Indigenous sites along the Patapsco, Patuxent, Middle and Little Patuxent River valleys. In 1652, the Susquehannock tribes signed a peace treaty with Maryland, giving up their provenance over the territory that is now Howard County. In 1800, the mean center of U.S. population as calculated by the US Census Bureau was found in what is now Howard County.

In 1838, Dr. William Watkins of Richland Manor proposed the "Howard District" of Anne Arundel County. After several adjournments, the area of western Anne Arundel County was designated the Howard District in 1839. The district had the same status as a county except that it was not separately represented in the Maryland General Assembly. In 1841, the county built its first courthouse in Ellicott City. At the January 1851 constitutional convention, Thomas Beale Dorsey submitted a petition led by James Sykes (Sykesville became a prominent community in subsequent years, and was named after him). A committee was formed with Dorsey, Bowie, Smith, Harbine and Ricaud. After several postponements, the district was erected officially as Howard County on July 4, 1851, after the approval of the new constitution at the election held June 4, 1851.

The plantations of modern Howard County used slave labor as early as 1690. At the time of the Underground Railroad, some Howard County residents assisted slaves who were escaping to freedom. This was particularly risky, as many prominent plantation families were Confederate sympathizers during the Civil War, contributing militiamen to the South to protect local interests. Maryland was exempt from the Emancipation Proclamation, later abolishing slavery in the update of the Maryland Constitution in November 1864.

On May 1, 1883, Howard County joined Anne Arundel County and Harford County in liquor prohibition.

By 1899, Howard County contained 400 miles (640 km) of dirt and 48 miles (77 km) of stone roads, including three paid turnpikes maintained by 118 men. Most traffic consisted of loads delivered to rail crossings. In 1909, County Commissioners Hess, Werner and O'Neil were charged with malfeasance regarding contract bids.

In 1918, a deadly flu pandemic swept the county starting with an early outbreak in Camp Meade in adjacent Anne Arundel County. The 1930s saw a shift from one-room schoolhouses to centralized schools with bus service. By 1939 wheat harvesting fell to just 18,800 acres (7,600 ha). In 1940, local newspaper owner Paul Griffith Stromberg led a five-county commission to study a superhighway between Baltimore and Washington through Howard County. The Federal Aid Highway Act of 1956 eventually led to the construction of Interstate 70 across northern Howard County and Interstate 95 across the eastern part of the county. The sparsely populated county hosted population centers in Ellicott City, Elkridge, Savage, North Laurel and Lisbon with W.R. Grace and Johns Hopkins Applied Physics Lab as the largest new employers. Residents elected officials that campaigned to keep the county rural while planners prepared public works to support a quarter million residents by the year 2000. Race relations and desegregation became major issues of the time.

From 1963 to 1966 the Rouse Company bought 14,000 acres (5,700 ha) of land and rezoned it for the Columbia Development. In 1972, the Marriott company proposed to build a regional theme park on Rouse-owned land but was denied zoning.

The county has a number of properties on the National Register of Historic Places.

== Geography ==
According to the U.S. Census Bureau, the county has a total area of 253 square miles (660 km^{2}), of which 251 square miles (650 km^{2}) is land and 2.7 square miles (7.0 km^{2}) (1.0%) is water. It is the second-smallest county in Maryland by land area and smallest by total area.

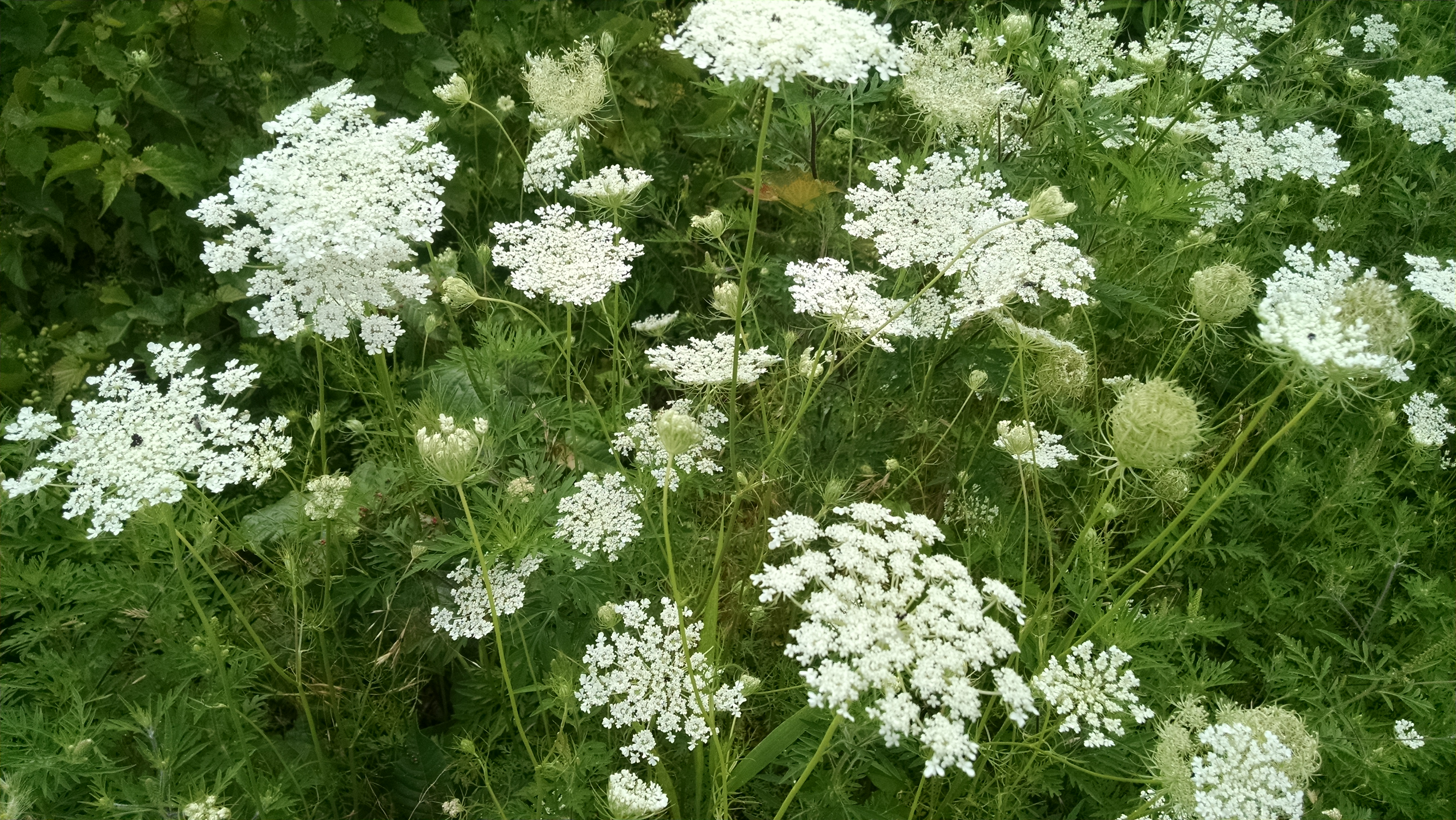
Daucus carota (Queen Anne's Lace) was designated as the official flower of Howard County in 1984.

Howard County is located in the Piedmont Plateau region of Maryland, with rolling hills making up most of the landscape. It is bounded on the north and northeast by the Patapsco River, on the southwest by the Patuxent River, and on the southeast by a land border with Anne Arundel County. Both the Patapsco and Patuxent run largely through publicly accessible parkland along the county borders. The Patuxent border includes the Triadelphia and Rocky Gorge reservoirs.

=== Adjacent counties ===
- Anne Arundel County (southeast)
- Baltimore County (northeast)
- Carroll County (north)
- Montgomery County (southwest)
- Prince George's County (south)
- Frederick County (west)

=== Climate ===
Howard County lies in the humid subtropical climate zone. As one travels west in the county away from the Baltimore area, the winter temperatures get lower and winter snow is more common. Annual rainfall is about 45 inches (1,100 mm) throughout the county. Over a 60-year period from 1950 to 2010, there were 394 National Climatic Data Center reportable events causing 617 injuries, and 99 fatalities. There were 9 reported tornadoes, reaching a maximum of F2, with no recorded fatalities.

== Demographics ==
For much of the 1800s and 1900s, Howard County was a predominantly white and mainly rural county with a small population. In 1950, the population was only 23,000. Since the 1950s, the county's population has increased tenfold and has diversified into a majority minority county. Almost half of Howard County's population identified as non-Hispanic and/or non-white by 2017. Much of the racial diversification of Howard County came after 1967, when The Rouse Company designed Columbia to be a planned community that included people from diverse socioeconomic and racial backgrounds. African-Americans have lived in Howard County for centuries, with the African-American population increasing greatly after the 1960s. Immigration from Asia, particularly Korea, India, and China, as well as Latin America, has also contributed to Howard County's diversity. While historically primarily Christian, Howard County now has sizable Jewish, Muslim, and Hindu populations. As of 2019, 18,700 Jewish people lived in the county, making up 5.8% of the total population. More than 6,000 non-Jewish people in the county have Jewish people in their households. As of 2010, only 1% of Jews in the county were Orthodox, while one-third each were Conservative and Reform and one-quarter were secular or non-denominational. In the same year, one-quarter of the Jewish community were poor or financially insecure, 17% made less than $50,000 per year, and half made annual incomes of $100,000 or more.

Historical population
| Census | Pop. | Note | %± |
|---|---|---|---|
| 1860 | 13,338 | | — |
| 1870 | 14,150 | | 6.1% |
| 1880 | 16,140 | | 14.1% |
| 1890 | 16,269 | | 0.8% |
| 1900 | 16,715 | | 2.7% |
| 1910 | 16,106 | | −3.6% |
| 1920 | 15,826 | | −1.7% |
| 1930 | 16,169 | | 2.2% |
| 1940 | 17,175 | | 6.2% |
| 1950 | 23,119 | | 34.6% |
| 1960 | 36,152 | | 56.4% |
| 1970 | 61,911 | | 71.3% |
| 1980 | 118,572 | | 91.5% |
| 1990 | 187,328 | | 58.0% |
| 2000 | 247,842 | | 32.3% |
| 2010 | 287,085 | | 15.8% |
| 2020 | 332,317 | | 15.8% |
| 2025 (est.) | 339,183 | ▲ | 2.1% |
U.S. Decennial Census; 1790-1960 1900-1990; 1990-2000 2010–2018 2010-2020

=== Racial and ethnic composition ===
Howard County, Maryland – Racial and ethnic composition Note: the US Census treats Hispanic/Latino as an ethnic category. This table excludes Latinos from the racial categories and assigns them to a separate category. Hispanics/Latinos may be of any race.
| Race / Ethnicity (NH = Non-Hispanic) | Pop 1980 | Pop 1990 | Pop 2000 | Pop 2010 | Pop 2020 | % 1980 | % 1990 | % 2000 | % 2010 | % 2020 |
|---|---|---|---|---|---|---|---|---|---|---|
| White alone (NH) | 100,311 | 153,417 | 180,010 | 169,972 | 155,236 | 84.60% | 81.90% | 72.63% | 59.21% | 46.71% |
| Black or African American alone (NH) | 13,741 | 21,652 | 35,353 | 49,150 | 64,018 | 11.59% | 11.56% | 14.26% | 17.12% | 19.26% |
| Native American or Alaska Native alone (NH) | 187 | 366 | 515 | 511 | 461 | 0.16% | 0.20% | 0.21% | 0.18% | 0.14% |
| Asian alone (NH) | 2,285 | 8,026 | 18,977 | 41,101 | 66,073 | 1.93% | 4.28% | 7.66% | 14.32% | 19.88% |
| Native Hawaiian or Pacific Islander alone (NH) | x | x | 80 | 105 | 114 | x | x | 0.03% | 0.04% | 0.03% |
| Other race alone (NH) | 564 | 168 | 656 | 746 | 2,213 | 0.48% | 0.09% | 0.26% | 0.26% | 0.67% |
| Mixed race or Multiracial (NH) | x | x | 4,761 | 8,771 | 16,840 | x | x | 1.92% | 3.06% | 5.07% |
| Hispanic or Latino (any race) | 1,484 | 3,699 | 7,490 | 16,729 | 27,362 | 1.25% | 1.97% | 3.02% | 5.83% | 8.23% |
| Total | 118,572 | 187,328 | 247,842 | 287,085 | 332,317 | 100.00% | 100.00% | 100.00% | 100.00% | 100.00% |

=== 2020 census ===
As of the 2020 census, the county had a population of 332,317, which translated to a population density of 1,300 inhabitants per square mile (500/km^{2}). The median age was 39.0 years; 24.4% of residents were under the age of 18, 14.3% were 65 years of age or older, and there were 94.4 males for every 100 females (91.3 males per 100 females age 18 and over). 88.1% of residents lived in urban areas while 11.9% lived in rural areas.

The racial makeup of the county was 47.9% White, 19.6% Black or African American, 0.4% American Indian and Alaska Native, 19.9% Asian, 0.0% Native Hawaiian and Pacific Islander, 3.9% from some other race, and 8.2% from two or more races. Hispanic or Latino residents of any race comprised 8.2% of the population.

There were 118,781 households in the county, of which 37.9% had children under the age of 18 living with them and 23.8% had a female householder with no spouse or partner present. About 21.1% of all households were made up of individuals and 7.8% had someone living alone who was 65 years of age or older.

There were 123,202 housing units, of which 3.6% were vacant. Among occupied housing units, 71.1% were owner-occupied and 28.9% were renter-occupied. The homeowner vacancy rate was 0.7% and the rental vacancy rate was 5.9%.

=== 2010 census ===
As of the 2010 United States census, there were 287,085 people, 104,749 households, and 76,333 families residing in the county. The population density was 1,144.9 inhabitants per square mile (442.0/km^{2}). There were 109,282 housing units at an average density of 435.8 per square mile (168.3/km^{2}). The racial makeup of the county was 62.2% white, 17.5% Black or African American, 14.4% Asian, 0.3% American Indian, 2.0% from other races, and 3.6% from two or more races. Those of Hispanic or Latino origin made up 5.8% of the population. In terms of ancestry, 17.7% were German, 13.9% were Irish, 10.6% were English, 7.0% were Italian, and 4.6% were American.

Of the 104,749 households, 39.3% had children under the age of 18 living with them, 58.9% were married couples living together, 10.5% had a female householder with no husband present, 27.1% were non-families, and 21.9% of all households were made up of individuals. The average household size was 2.72, and the average family size was 3.20. The median age was 38.4 years.

The median income for a household in the county was $103,273, and the median income for a family was $119,810. Males had a median income of $82,307 versus $59,128 for females. The per capita income for the county was $45,294. About 2.8% of families and 4.2% of the population were below the poverty line, including 4.6% of those under age 18 and 5.5% of those age 65 or over.

=== 2000 census ===
As of the census of 2000, there were 247,842 people, 90,043 households, and 65,821 families residing in the county. The population density was 983 inhabitants per square mile (380/km^{2}). There were 92,818 housing units at an average density of 368 per square mile (142/km^{2}). The racial makeup of the county was 74.33% White, 14.42% Black, 0.24% Native American, 7.68% Asian, 0.04% Pacific Islander, 1.11% from other races, and 2.19% from two or more races. 3.02% of the population were Hispanic or Latino of any race. 15.1% were of German, 11.0% Irish, 9.3% English, 6.6% Italian and 5.7% American ancestry.

There were 90,043 households, out of which 40.00% had children under the age of 18 living with them, 60.50% were married couples living together, 9.50% had a female householder with no husband present, and 26.90% were non-families. 20.80% of all households were made up of individuals, and 4.60% had someone living alone who was 65 years of age or older. The average household size was 2.71, and the average family size was 3.18.

In the county, the population was spread out, with 28.10% under the age of 18, 6.30% from 18 to 24, 34.40% from 25 to 44, 23.80% from 45 to 64, and 7.50% who were 65 years of age or older. The median age was 36 years. For every 100 females, there were 96.60 males. For every 100 females age 18 and over, there were 92.90 males.

The median income for a household in the county was $101,003, and the median income for a family was $117,186 in 2009. The per capita income was $44,120. About 2.70% of families and 4.00% of the population were below the poverty line.

== Education ==
The Howard County Public School System, the school district for the entire county, manages 71 schools and serves approximately 49,000 students. The graduation rate from this school district was 90.4% in 2009, and the county's schools are ranked among the best in the state. Student test scores consistently top the list for all Maryland school districts. Reservoir High School is currently the largest school in the county with over 1,900 students.

=== Library ===
In 2013 Howard County Library System was selected as the Library of the Year by Library Journal and cited by editor-at-large, John N. Berry, as "a 21st-century library model, with a position, doctrine, purpose, and curriculum worthy of study and consideration by every library in America, if not the world." In 2015 the Howard County Library System was designated the top Star Library in its class.

== Politics and government ==
Howard County has voted for the Democratic presidential candidate in every election from 1992 on. In the 2020 presidential election, Democratic Party candidate Joe Biden received the highest percentage of Howard County's votes of any presidential candidate in the history of the county. The less populated western and northern parts of Howard County lean Republican. The more heavily populated southern and eastern parts are heavily Democratic.

Howard County has a record of acting as a bellwether in state-wide elections since the late 20th century: Since at least the 1950s, Howard County has voted for the successful senatorial candidate in both Maryland's Class I and Class III seats, and since 1998 the county has voted for the successful gubernatorial candidate, voting for Republican Bob Ehrlich in the 2002 gubernatorial election, Democrat Martin O'Malley in 2006 and 2010, Republican Larry Hogan in 2014 and 2018, and Democrat Wes Moore in 2022. Since 1984, the county has also voted for the state-wide presidential winner, a streak of 10 straight presidential elections.

At the state level of government, Howard County is represented by nine Democrats in the Maryland House of Delegates and three Democrats in the Maryland Senate. One Democratic state senator from the county represents a district that spills into Montgomery County to the west, as do two Democratic state delegates. Another Democratic state senator represents a district that splits into Anne Arundel County to the south-east, along with two Democratic state delegates.

From 1914 to 1968, Howard County was governed by a system of three elected commissioners with four-year terms. Prior to 1962, the only polling location in the county was located in Ellicott City. In May 1962, voters were offered a second location to vote, also in Ellicott City at the National Armory on Montgomery Road. Senator James Clark Jr. proposed a five-person County Council and a County Executive in 1965. In 1968, the county implemented a charter form of government. In 1984 a councilmanic referendum was approved, switching council from at-large representation to district representation. The County Council serves as the county's legislative branch; members also provide constituent service and sit as members of the Zoning Board and Liquor Board. The current Howard County Executive is Democrat Brandee Ganz, who took office in an acting capacity on November 16, 2026, following the resignation of Calvin Ball III. The county is entirely within Maryland's 3rd congressional district, represented by Democrat Sarah Elfreth.

=== Voter registration ===
Voter registration and party enrollment as of March 2024
| Democratic | 121,196 | 51.66% |
| Unaffiliated | 61,771 | 26.33% |
| Republican | 48,131 | 20.52% |
| Libertarian | 965 | 0.41% |
| Other parties | 2,522 | 1.08% |
| Total | 234,585 | 100% |

United States presidential election results for Howard County, Maryland
| Year | Republican / Whig | | Democratic | | Third party(ies) | |
| Year | No. | % | No. | % | No. | % |
|---|---|---|---|---|---|---|
| 1852 | 570 | 47.70% | 625 | 52.30% | 0 | 0.00% |
| 1856 | 0 | 0.00% | 633 | 41.32% | 899 | 58.68% |
| 1860 | 1 | 0.06% | 189 | 12.19% | 1,360 | 87.74% |
| 1864 | 579 | 42.67% | 778 | 57.33% | 0 | 0.00% |
| 1868 | 490 | 32.62% | 1,012 | 67.38% | 0 | 0.00% |
| 1872 | 1,309 | 52.26% | 1,196 | 47.74% | 0 | 0.00% |
| 1876 | 1,189 | 41.98% | 1,641 | 57.94% | 2 | 0.07% |
| 1880 | 1,365 | 43.31% | 1,787 | 56.69% | 0 | 0.00% |
| 1884 | 1,392 | 44.20% | 1,733 | 55.03% | 24 | 0.76% |
| 1888 | 1,521 | 45.27% | 1,774 | 52.80% | 65 | 1.93% |
| 1892 | 1,410 | 41.35% | 1,920 | 56.30% | 80 | 2.35% |
| 1896 | 1,981 | 51.19% | 1,786 | 46.15% | 103 | 2.66% |
| 1900 | 1,800 | 47.58% | 1,904 | 50.33% | 79 | 2.09% |
| 1904 | 1,258 | 39.00% | 1,914 | 59.33% | 54 | 1.67% |
| 1908 | 1,276 | 41.20% | 1,764 | 56.96% | 57 | 1.84% |
| 1912 | 1,004 | 33.92% | 1,523 | 51.45% | 433 | 14.63% |
| 1916 | 1,346 | 40.51% | 1,913 | 57.57% | 64 | 1.93% |
| 1920 | 2,608 | 51.46% | 2,397 | 47.30% | 63 | 1.24% |
| 1924 | 1,989 | 38.48% | 2,786 | 53.90% | 394 | 7.62% |
| 1928 | 3,296 | 51.36% | 3,088 | 48.12% | 33 | 0.51% |
| 1932 | 1,970 | 31.83% | 4,161 | 67.22% | 59 | 0.95% |
| 1936 | 2,638 | 38.65% | 4,138 | 60.63% | 49 | 0.72% |
| 1940 | 3,082 | 43.60% | 3,957 | 55.98% | 30 | 0.42% |
| 1944 | 3,344 | 51.57% | 3,140 | 48.43% | 0 | 0.00% |
| 1948 | 3,113 | 51.64% | 2,725 | 45.21% | 190 | 3.15% |
| 1952 | 5,497 | 59.09% | 3,693 | 39.70% | 112 | 1.20% |
| 1956 | 6,534 | 64.48% | 3,599 | 35.52% | 0 | 0.00% |
| 1960 | 7,051 | 56.57% | 5,412 | 43.42% | 2 | 0.02% |
| 1964 | 6,833 | 45.50% | 8,185 | 54.50% | 0 | 0.00% |
| 1968 | 9,957 | 53.81% | 5,752 | 31.08% | 2,796 | 15.11% |
| 1972 | 19,265 | 63.55% | 10,668 | 35.19% | 383 | 1.26% |
| 1976 | 21,200 | 50.80% | 20,533 | 49.20% | 0 | 0.00% |
| 1980 | 24,272 | 47.04% | 20,702 | 40.12% | 6,625 | 12.84% |
| 1984 | 35,641 | 57.78% | 25,713 | 41.68% | 334 | 0.54% |
| 1988 | 44,153 | 56.22% | 34,007 | 43.30% | 370 | 0.47% |
| 1992 | 38,594 | 38.67% | 44,763 | 44.85% | 16,441 | 16.47% |
| 1996 | 40,849 | 42.77% | 47,569 | 49.81% | 7,090 | 7.42% |
| 2000 | 49,809 | 44.17% | 58,556 | 51.92% | 4,414 | 3.91% |
| 2004 | 59,724 | 44.63% | 72,257 | 54.00% | 1,829 | 1.37% |
| 2008 | 55,393 | 38.14% | 87,120 | 59.99% | 2,720 | 1.87% |
| 2012 | 57,758 | 37.72% | 91,393 | 59.69% | 3,957 | 2.58% |
| 2016 | 47,484 | 29.28% | 102,597 | 63.26% | 12,112 | 7.47% |
| 2020 | 48,390 | 26.43% | 129,433 | 70.70% | 5,239 | 2.86% |
| 2024 | 49,425 | 27.11% | 124,764 | 68.44% | 8,102 | 4.44% |

=== County Council ===
The County Council adopts ordinances and resolutions, and has all of the county's legislative powers. There are five council districts throughout the county. The current County Council as of December 2022 includes 4 Democrats and 1 Republican.

Howard County Council
| District | Name | Party | Representing |
|---|---|---|---|
| District 1 | Elizabeth Walsh | Democratic | Ellicott City, Elkridge |
| District 2 | Opel Jones | Democratic | East Columbia, Elkridge |
| District 3 | Christiana Rigby | Democratic | North Laurel, Jessup |
| District 4 | Deb Jung | Democratic | Columbia, Fulton |
| District 5 | David Yungmann | Republican | Western Howard County |

=== County commissioners ===
| Chairman | Affiliation | Term | Commissioner | Affiliation | Term | Commissioner | Affiliation | Term |
|---|---|---|---|---|---|---|---|---|
| George Howard | Anti-Jacksonian Party | 1840 | Zedekiah Moore | | 1840 | Charles Worthington Dorsey | | 1840 |
| William H. Worthington | | 1841–1845 | Wesley Linthicum | | 1841–1845 | Perry Gaither | | 1841 |
| William H. Worthington | | 1841–1845 | Wesley Linthicum | | 1841–1845 | George W. Hobbs | | 1842–1845 |
| William H. Worthington | | 1841–1845 | Wesley Linthicum | | 1841-1845 | George W. Hobbs, Perry Gaither, William Welling | | 1845 |
| Samuel Brown | | 1846 | William Hughes | | 1846 | Reuben P. Hammond | | 1846 |
| William H. Worthington | | 1847 | William Hughes | | 1847 | George W. Hobbs, Charles R. Simpson | | 1847 |
| William Hughes | | 1848–1849 | George Howard | | 1848 | Charles R. Simpson, John Hood, Theodore Tubman | | 1848 |
| William Hughes | | 1848–1849 | Theodore Tubman | | 1848–1853 | Littleton Maclin, Thomas Burgess | | 1849 |
| Littleton Maclin | | 1850 | Theodore Tubman | | 1848-1853 | David E. Hopkins, David Feelemyer, Samuel Brown | | 1850 |
| Thomas B. Hobbs | | 1851 | Theodore Tubman | | 1848–1853 | Samuel Nichols, Samuel Brown, David Clark, David Feelemyer | | 1851 |
| Theodore Tubman | | 1848–1853 | David Clark | | 1853 | David Feelemyer, George Bond | | 1853 |
| Slingsby Linthicum | | 1854 | George Bond | | 1854 | Steven B. Dorsey | | 1854 |
| George Bond | | 1855 | Slingsby Linthicum | | 1855 | Steven B. Dorsey, Theodore Tubman | | 1855 |
| Samuel Hopkins | Republican | 1865 | | | | | | |
| John T. Ridgely | | 1885–1888 | Ephraim Collins | | 1885– | B. C. Sunderland | | 1885– |
| Benjamin C. Sunderland | | 1889–1892 | Benjamin F. Hess | | 1889–1892 | Edmund Dorsey | Republican | 1889–1892 |
| Benjamin F. Hess | | 1901–1904 | Thomas O' Neill | | 1901–1904 | Jacob J. Werner | | 1901–1904 |
| Jacob J. Werner | | 1905–1907 | Benjamin F. Hess | | 1905–1907 | Henry A Penny | | 1905–1911 |
| Benjamin F. Hess | | 1908–1909 | Amos Howard Earp | | 1908–1911 | Jacob J. Werner | | 1908–1913 |
| Amos Howard Earp | | 1911–1917 | Grosvenor Hanson | | 1911–1915 | William H. Davis | | 1911–1915 |
| Amos Howard Earp | | 1915–1917 | Grosvenor Hanson | | 1915–1917 | De Wilton C. Partlett | | 1915–1917 |
| Amos Howard Earp | | 1917–1919 | John H. Shaab | | 1917–1919 | De Wilton C. Partlett | | 1917–1919 |
| Amos Howard Earp | | 1920–1926 | Daniel H. Gaither | | 1920–1926 | De Wilton C. Parlett | | 1920–1926 |
| DeWilton C. Parlett | | 1926–1930 | H. Thomas Glimes | | 1926–1930 | Daniel H. Gaither | | 1926–1930 |
| H. Grafton Penny | Democrat | 1930–1934 | J. Frank Curtis | | 1930–1934 | Daniel H. Gaither | | 1930–1934 |
| H. Grafton Penny | Democrat | 1935–1938 | Robert H. Mercer | Democrat | 1935–1938 | Hart B. Noll | Republican | 1935–1938 |
| Charles E. Miller | Republican | 1938–1942 | | | | | | |
| James Franklin Curtis | Republican | 1942–1949 | Charles E. Miller | Republican | 1942–1949 | | | |
| Norman E. Moxley | Democrat | 1949–1957 | Roby H. Mullinix | Democrat | 1949–1954 | E. Walter Scott | Democrat | 1949–1954 |
| Norman E. Moxley | Democrat | 1958–1959 | Howard W. Clark | Democrat | 1957–1958 | Charles E. Harman | Democrat | 1957–1958 |
| Charles M. Scott | Democrat | 1959–1962 | Norman E. Moxley | Democrat | 1959–1962 | Arthur K. Pickett | Democrat | 1959–1962 |
| Charles E. Miller | Republican | 1962–1966 | J. Hubert Black | Republican | 1962–1966 | David W. Force | Republican | 1962–1966 |
| Charles E. Miller | Republican | 1966–1970 | J. Hubert Black | Republican | 1966–1970 | Ridgley Jones | Democrat | 1968–1970 |

=== County executives and council members ===
| Name | Affiliation | Term | Council (districts 1, 2, 3, 4, 5) |
|---|---|---|---|
| Omar J. Jones | Democrat | 1969–1973 | Alva S. Baker, Edward L. Cochran, J. Hugh Nichols, Charles E. Miller, William S. Hanna |
| Edward L. Cochran | Democrat | 1974–1978 | Richard Anderson (Elizabeth Bobo - appointed), Ruth Keeton, Lloyd Kowles, Virginia Thomas, Thomas Yeager |
| J. Hugh Nichols | Democrat | 1978–1982 | Ruth U. Keeton, Elizabeth Bobo, Lloyd G. Knowles, Virginia M. Thomas, Thomas M. Yeager |
| J. Hugh Nichols | Democrat | 1982–1986 | Ruth U. Keeton, Elizabeth Bobo, James C. Clark, C. Vernon Gray, Lloyd G. Knowles |
| William E. Eakle | Democrat | 1986 | Ruth U. Keeton, Elizabeth Bobo, James C. Clark, C. Vernon Gray, Lloyd G. Knowles |
| Elizabeth Bobo | Democrat | 1986–1990 | Angela Beltram, C. Vernon Gray, Shane Pendergrass, Ruth Keeton, Charles Feaga |
| Charles I. Ecker | Republican | 1990–1994 | Darrel E. Drown, C. Vernon Gray, Shane Pendergrass, Paul R. Farragut, Charles Feaga |
| Charles I. Ecker | Republican | 1994–1998 | Darrel E. Drown, C. Vernon Gray, Dennis R. Schrader, Mary C. Lorsung, Charles Feaga |
| James N. Robey | Democrat | 1998–2002 | Christopher J. Merdon, C. Vernon Gray, Guy Guzzone, Mary C. Lorsung, Allan H. Kittleman |
| James N. Robey | Democrat | 2002–2006 | Christopher J. Merdon, David A. Rakes (Calvin Ball-appointed), Guy Guzzone, Ken Ulman, Allan H. Kittleman (Charles C. Feaga-appointed) |
| Kenneth Ulman | Democrat | 2006–2010 | Courtney Watson, Calvin Ball, Jen Terrasa, Mary Kay Sigaty, Greg Fox |
| Kenneth Ulman | Democrat | 2010–2014 | Courtney Watson, Calvin Ball, Jen Terrasa, Mary Kay Sigaty, Greg Fox |
| Allan H. Kittleman | Republican | 2014–2018 | Jon Weinstein, Calvin Ball, Jen Terrasa, Mary Kay Sigaty, Greg Fox |
| Calvin Ball III | Democrat | 2018–2022 | Elizabeth Walsh, Opel Jones, Christiana Rigby, Deb Jung, David Yungmann |
| Calvin Ball III | Democrat | 2022–2026 | Elizabeth Walsh, Opel Jones, Christiana Rigby, Deb Jung, David Yungmann |
| Brandee Ganz (acting) | Democrat | 2026 | Elizabeth Walsh, Opel Jones, Christiana Rigby, Deb Jung, David Yungmann |

=== Departments ===
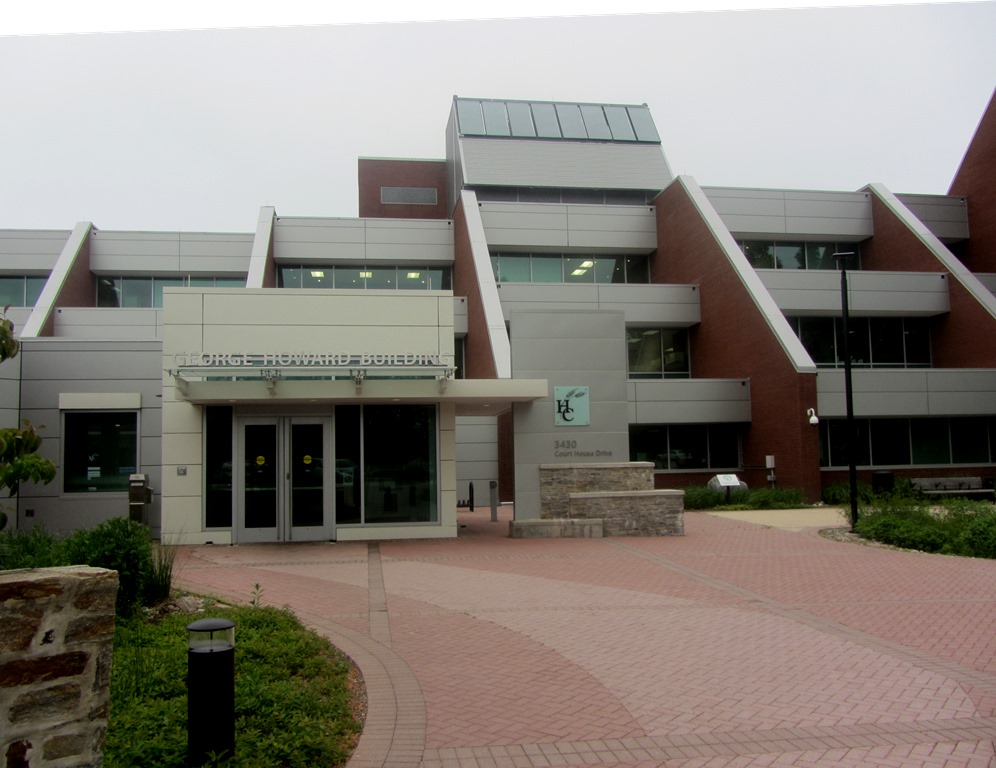
George Howard Building in 2014

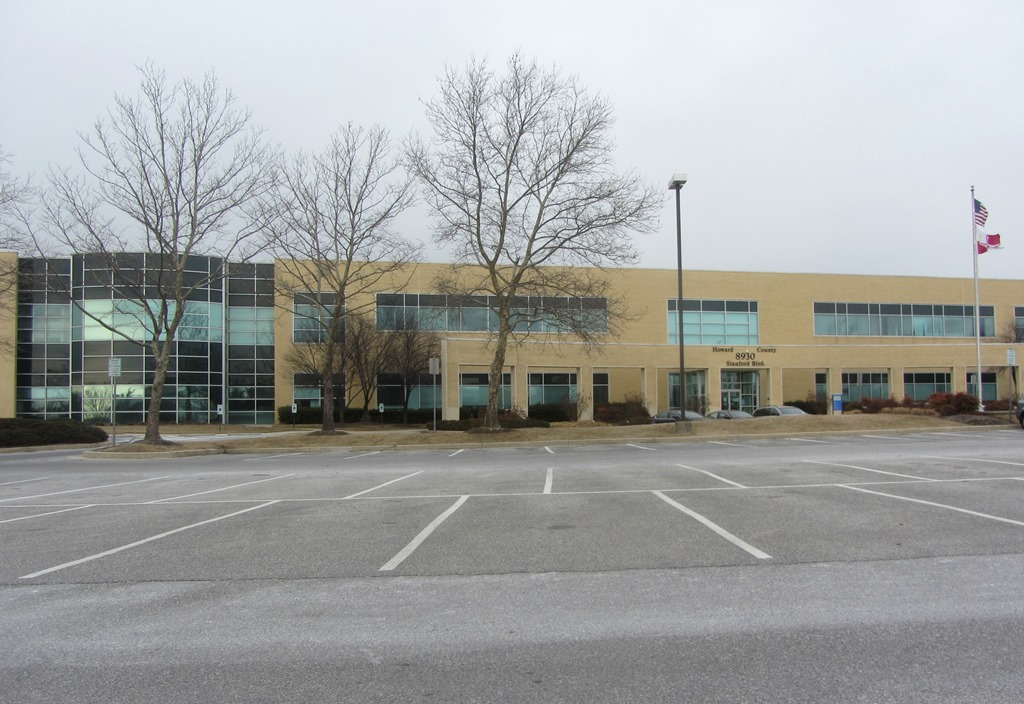
Howard County Health Department relocated to this office purchased from Ascend One in 2011

Department
Howard County government
Howard County Public School System
Howard County Housing and Community Development
Howard County Board of Elections
Howard County Library
Howard County Fire and Rescue
Howard County Police
Howard County Sheriff's Office
Howard County Department of Corrections
Howard Community College
Howard County Animal Control
Howard County Office of Natural Resources
Howard County Department of Recreation & Parks
Howard County Department Recycling Division
Howard County Department of Planning and Zoning

== Economy ==
Statistics for July 2014 indicate that Howard County's unemployment rate is at 5.2 percent (7,527 persons).

Howard County Public School System employs 8,136 of which 4,670 are teachers. The County Government employs 3,323 outside of the school system with 672 police, 482 public works, and 472 fire and rescue employees. The top ten private sector employers in Howard County are as follows:

| # | Employer | # of Employees |
|---|---|---|
| 1 | Johns Hopkins University Applied Physics Laboratory | 8,000 |
| 2 | Verizon Wireless | 2,028 |
| 3 | Lorien Health Systems | 2,000 |
| 4 | Howard County General Hospital | 1,777 |
| 5 | Howard Community College | 1,294 |
| 6 | Leidos | 1,195 |
| 7 | Giant Food | 1,050 |
| 8 | The Columbia Association | 900 |
| 9 | Wells Fargo | 842 |
| 10 | Oracle Corporation subsidiary MICROS Systems | 815 |

== Awards ==
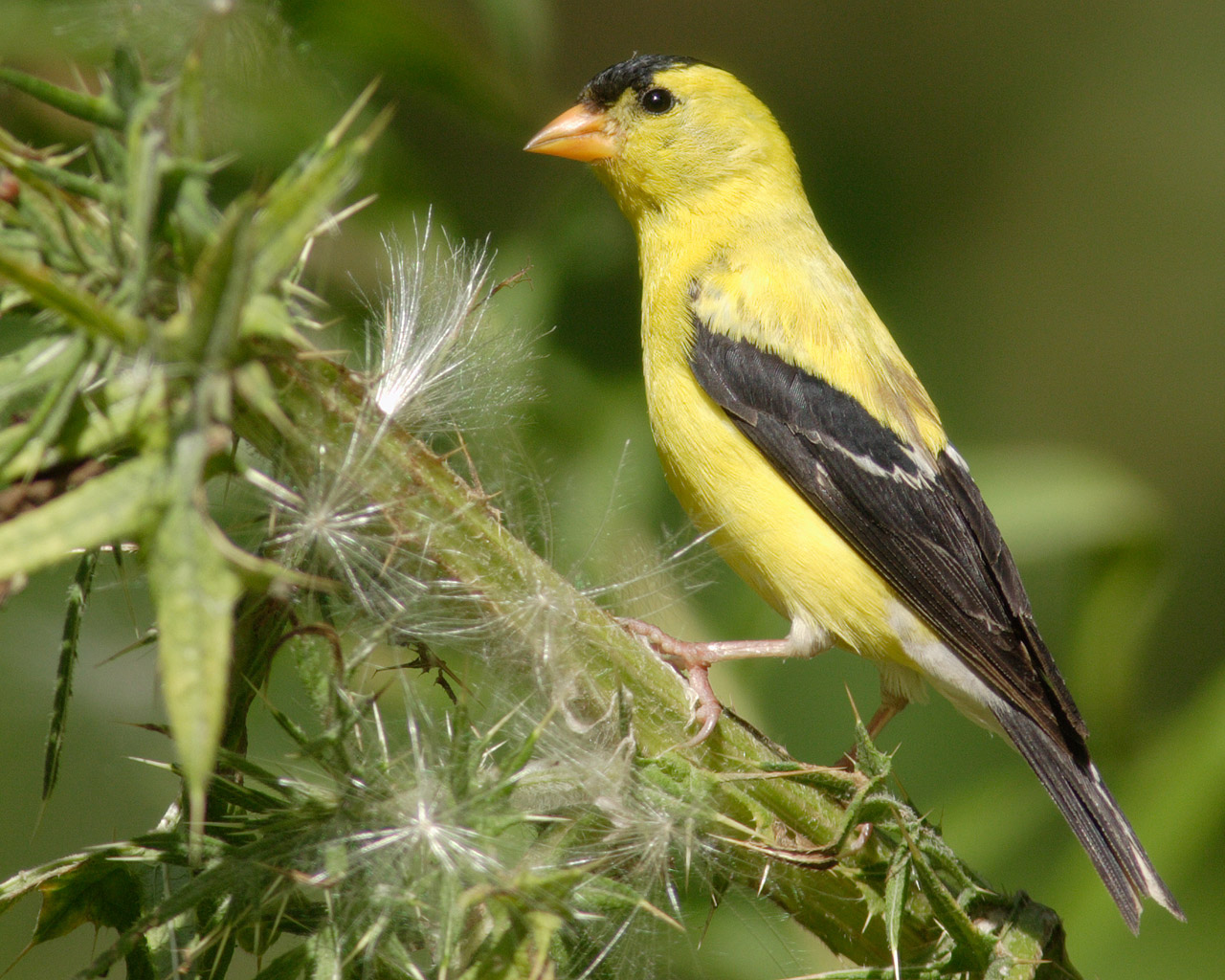
The American goldfinch is the official county bird of Howard County.

Awards and recognitions achieved by Howard County or locations within it include the following:

- "4th Richest County in America", Forbes Magazine, 2017.
- "Best American Values", Newsmax Magazine: Ellicott City #17 (2009).
- "Best Place to Live", CNN/Money: Columbia (#1 in 2016); Ellicott City/Columbia (#6 in 2014; #8 in 2012; #2 in 2010; #8 in 2008; #4 in 2006.)
- "Best Places to Live for Pet Lovers", CNN/Money: Ellicott City, one of 10 (2009).
- "Best Place to Raise a Family", Forbes: #17 (2008).
- "Good Sports Community of the Year", Sports Illustrated (2005)
- "Great Public Library System", Hennen's American Public Library Ratings: #4 in population category in 2010; 8 times appearing in top 10 in a 10-year range.
- "Healthiest Maryland County", University of Wisconsin Population Health Institute. (2013, 2012, 2011, 2010)
- "Heart Safe Community of the Year", International Association of Fire Chiefs. (2012)
- "Library of the Year", Library Journal. (2013)
- "Preserve America Community", Advisory Council on Historic Preservation. (2013)
- Top Outdoor Concert Venue for Merriweather Post Pavilion (a top five) by Pollstar (2012).
- "Tree City Community", Arbor Day Foundation. (23 years)
- "Venues that Rock", Rolling Stone: #4 outdoor venue, Merriweather Post Pavilion (2013).
- "Winning Community", National Civic League. (2001)

== Notable people ==
- Edward Norton, actor
- Taylor Cummings, lacrosse player
- Toby Orenstein, theater director
- Yumi Hogan, politician
- Michael Campanaro, football wide receiver
- Zach Brown, football linebacker
- Kenneth Ulman, politician
- Ernie Pickett, weightlifter
- Charles Schnetzler, scientist
- Laura Lippman, author
- Lloyd Keaser, wrestler
- Nina Basu, president of the Inner Arbor Trust
- James B. Garvin, scientist
- Brent Faiyaz, singer and record producer
- K.A.A.N., rapper and songwriter

== Culture and attractions ==
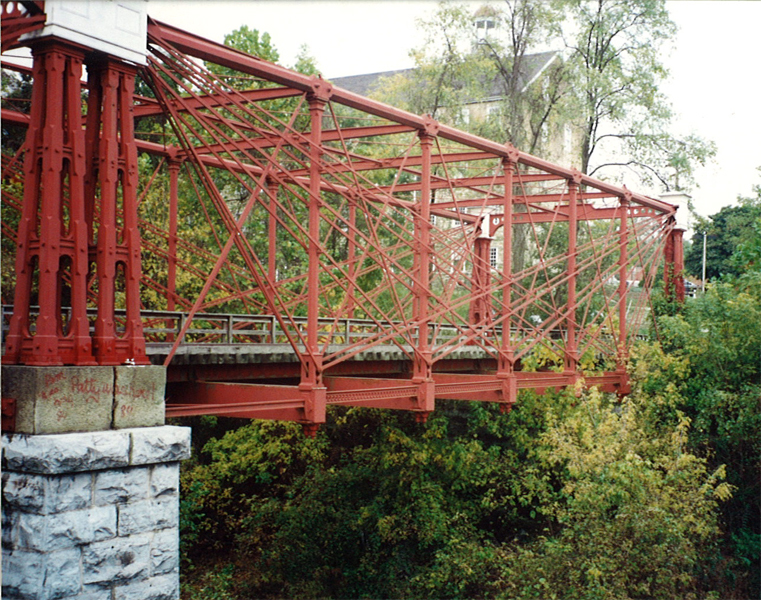
Bollman Truss Bridge in Savage

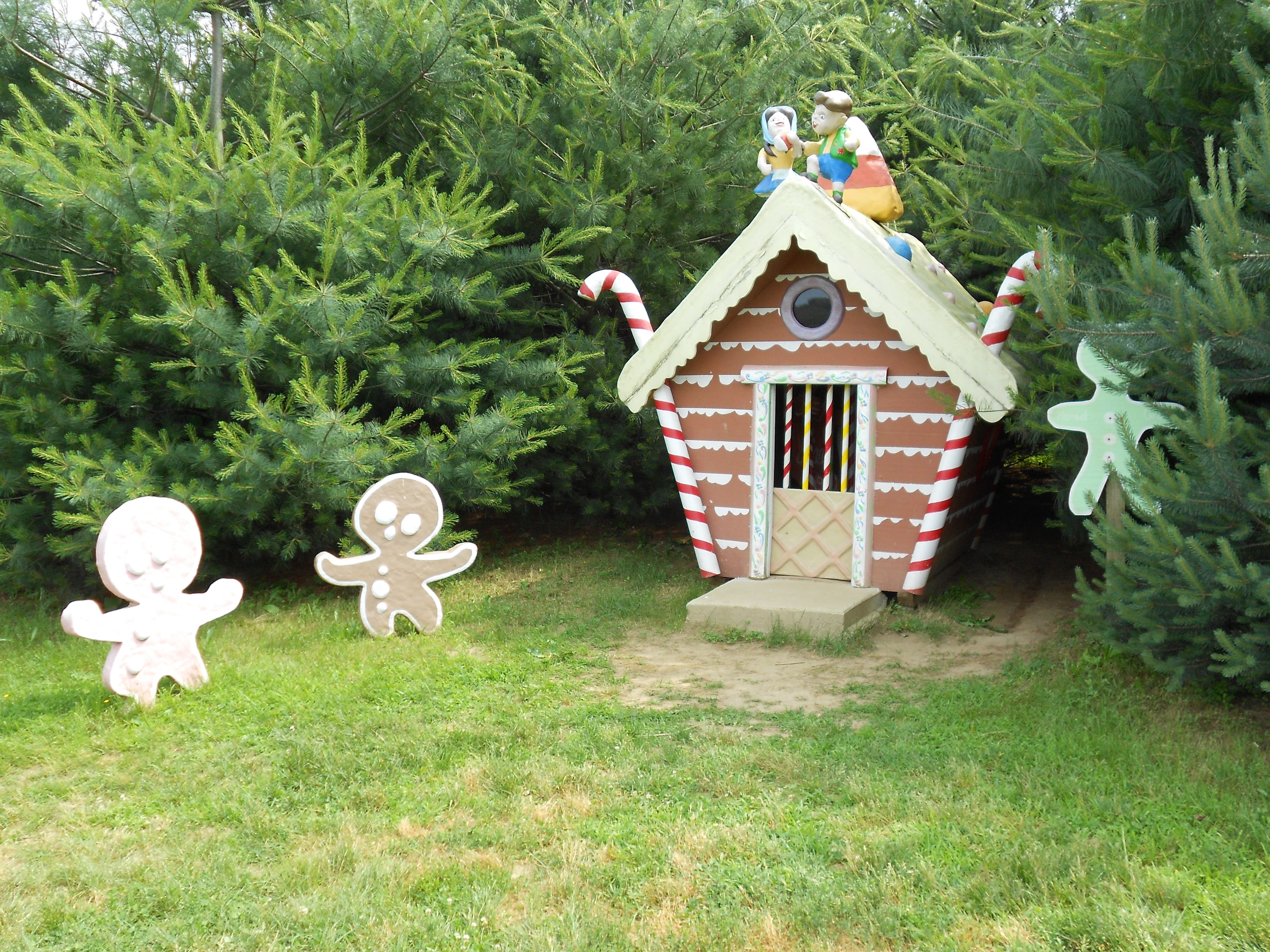
The Enchanted Forest gingerbread house at Clark's Elioak Farm

- Blandair, an open space preserve
- Bollman Truss Railroad Bridge
- The Candlelight Concert Society
- The Chesapeake Shakespeare Company
- Clark's Elioak Farm
- Columbia Center for Theatrical Arts
- The Columbia Orchestra
- Ellicott City Historic Main Street
- Ellicott City Station
- The Enchanted Forest (closed – some features relocated to Clark's Elioak Farm)
- Howard County Center for the Arts
- Howard County Library
- Horowitz Visual and Performing Arts Center
- Maryland's Koreatown
- Merriweather Post Pavilion
- Rep Stage
- James and Anne Robinson Nature Center
- Savage Mill
- Shrine of St. Anthony
- Toby's Dinner Theatre

== Transportation ==
=== Airports ===
Howard County does not have any commercial or public-use airport facilities. A 1967 Airport Study Commission recommended a facility for 150–250 aircraft to provide economic development, but was not initiated. With the closure of Haysfield Airport in 2012, there is one privately owned airstrip, Glenair Airport in Glenelg. Commercial air service is provided by Baltimore/Washington International Airport, Ronald Reagan Washington National Airport, and Washington Dulles International Airport.

=== Major highways ===
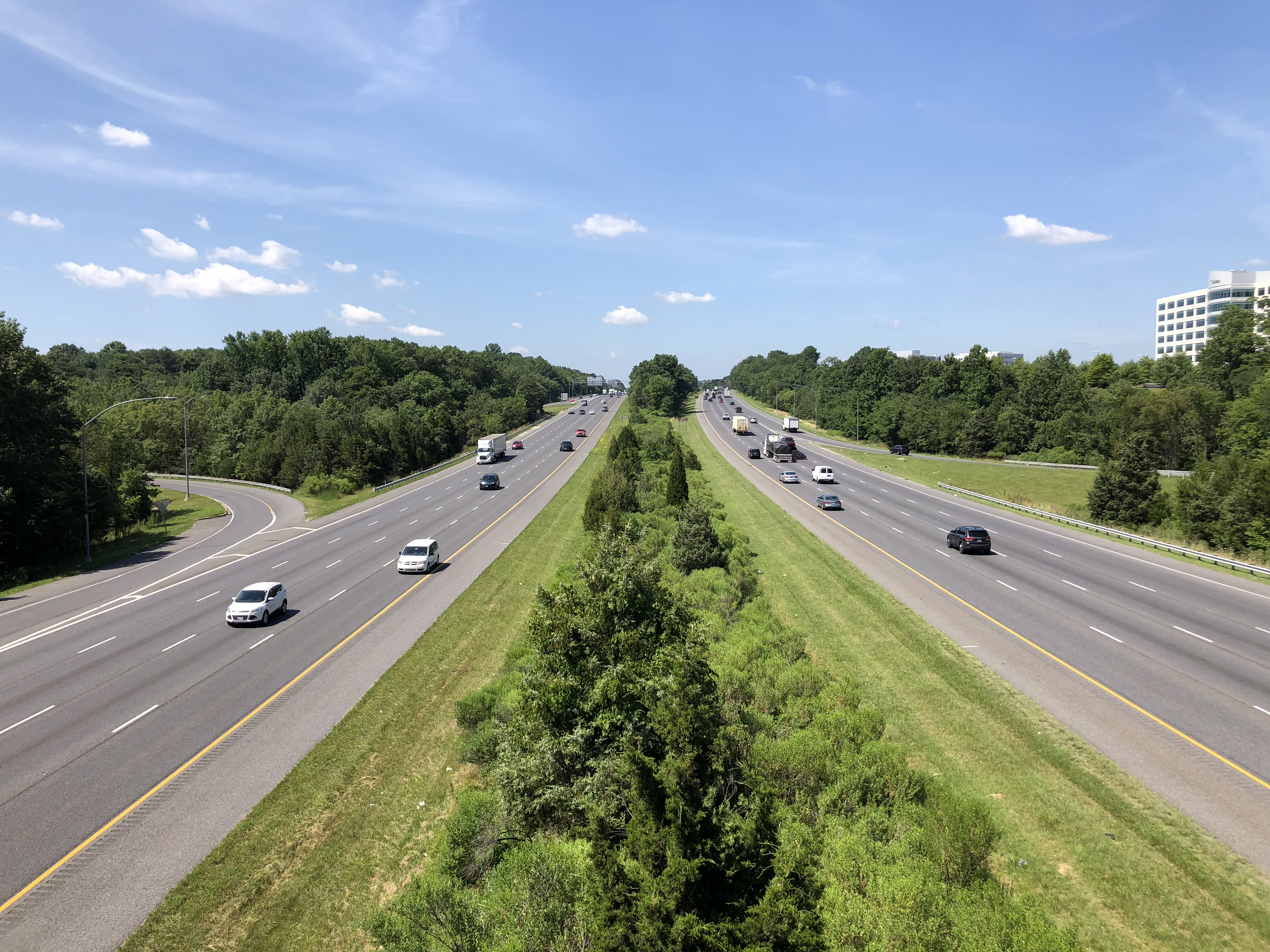
I-95 in Howard County

- I-70
- I-95
- I-895
- US 1
- US 29
- US 40
- MD 27
- MD 32
- MD 94
- MD 97
- MD 99
- MD 100
- MD 103
- MD 108
- MD 125
- MD 144
- MD 175
- MD 216

== Communities ==
=== Census-designated places ===
The Census Bureau recognizes the following Census-designated places in the county:

- Columbia
- Elkridge
- Ellicott City (county seat)
- Fulton
- Highland
- Ilchester
- Jessup (partly in Anne Arundel County)
- Lisbon
- North Laurel
- Savage
- Scaggsville

=== Unincorporated communities ===
Unincorporated places not listed as Census-designated places but known in the area include:

- Clarksville
- Cooksville
- Daniels
- Dayton
- Dorsey
- Glenelg
- Glenwood
- Granite
- Guilford
- Hanover (partly in Anne Arundel County)
- Isaacsville
- Marriottsville (partly in Carroll County and Baltimore County)
- Simpsonville
- West Friendship
- Woodbine
- Woodstock

== See also ==
- National Register of Historic Places listings in Howard County, Maryland
- Maryland Historical Trust Register of Historic Places in Howard County, Maryland
