= Glenelg, Maryland =

Unincorporated community in Maryland, United States

- Unincorporated community
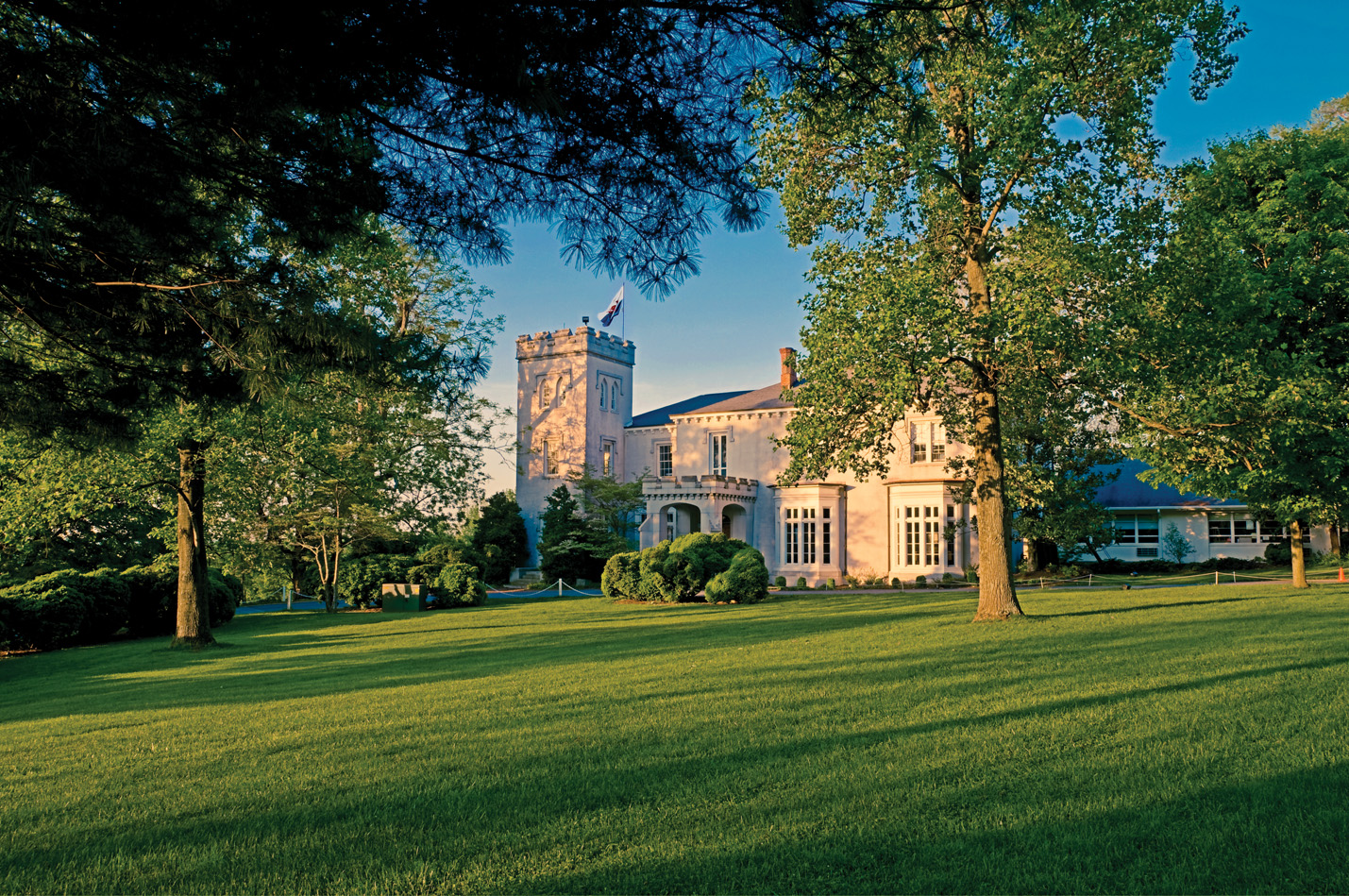
- Glenelg Country School

- Location within Maryland Location within the United States
- Coordinates: 39°15′51″N 76°59′33″W
- Country: United States
- State: Maryland
- County: Howard

Population
  - Total: 1,724
- Time zone: UTC-5 (Eastern (EST))
  - Summer (DST): UTC-4 (EDT)
- ZIP Code: 21737
- Area code: 410

Glenelg is an unincorporated community in Howard County, Maryland, United States. It is located in the 21737 ZIP Code, and is part of the 410 area code. It is the home town of Glenelg High School.

== History ==
John Dorsey, who was one of the first settlers in what is now Howard County and a prominent man, gave land to his daughter Sarah Dorsey Howard and her husband Henry Howard out in the western part of the county (which is now Glenelg) in 1735. The property was called Howard's Resolution. Ephraim Howard, son of Sara and Henry, built a house on the property in the middle or late 18th century.

In 1884, an additional section was added on to the front of the house. The newer front section was built by General Joseph Tyson, Assistant Postmaster General under President John Tyler. General and Mrs. Tyson called their home "Glenelg" after an old estate in Scotland and "because it spelled the same from either end" — in other words, a palindrome. Although historically not a true manor house, what is today known as "Glenelg Manor" forms the nucleus of a sprawling structure, which houses the Glenelg Country School lower school division. Glenelg Country School is in neighboring Ellicott City.

Discovery Farm was built land patented as "Second Discovery" in 1729. A house was built starting with a kitchen in 1760 with nearby slave quarters. Folly Quarter road was once one of the "Rolling roads" that slaves would roll hogsheads of tobacco toward Elkridge Landing for sale.

A postal village named Glenelg was put in operation on February 6, 1856. The post office served the community out of Browns General store for 133 years until moved into the Ten Oaks shopping center in 1983. By 1878 population increased to 75, with land values ranging from $10 to $30 an acre. In 1915, a Typhoid fever epidemic struck 20 residents, with four deaths.

The Howard Hunt Club ranged throughout the Glenelg area. Future General George S. Patton would travel from Ft. Myer, Va. to hunt along Homewood Road.

== Economy ==
The economy of Glenelg is primarily driven by commuting professionals working in Baltimore and Washington, DC metro areas, along with a few local restaurants and storefronts.

The median household income in Glenelg is $195,104.00, making it one of the wealthier communities in the United States.

== Community statistics ==
- ZIP Code: 21737
- Area Code: 410
- Population: 1,724
- Median household income: $195,104.00
- Median home price: $1,012,410
- Total Households: 669

== See also ==
- Isaacville, Maryland
- Ivory, Maryland
- Roxbury Mill
