= Howard County Sheriff's Office =

Law enforcement organization

- Howard County Sheriff's Office patch
- Abbreviation: HCSO

Jurisdictional structure
- Operations jurisdiction: Maryland, USA
- Map of Howard County Sheriff's Office's jurisdiction
- Area: 254 square miles (660 km^{2})
- Population: 304,580 (2013)
- General nature: Local civilian police

Operational structure
- Headquarters: Ellicott City, Maryland
- Agency executive: Marcus Harris, sheriff

Website
- https://www.howardcountymd.gov/Branches/Sheriffs-Office

The Howard County Sheriff's Office (HCSO) is a law enforcement organization which acts as the enforcement arm of the Howard County court system and services Howard County, Maryland, population 328,200. Its mission centers around providing judicial enforcement and physical security for the Circuit Court. The department is a secondary law enforcement agency as police services are mostly provided by the larger, better-known Howard County Police Department while the county jail is run by the Howard County Department of Corrections. However, sheriff's deputies are fully certified law enforcement officers with the same authority as any police officer in the state of Maryland. They assist county police officers with calls for service.

== History ==
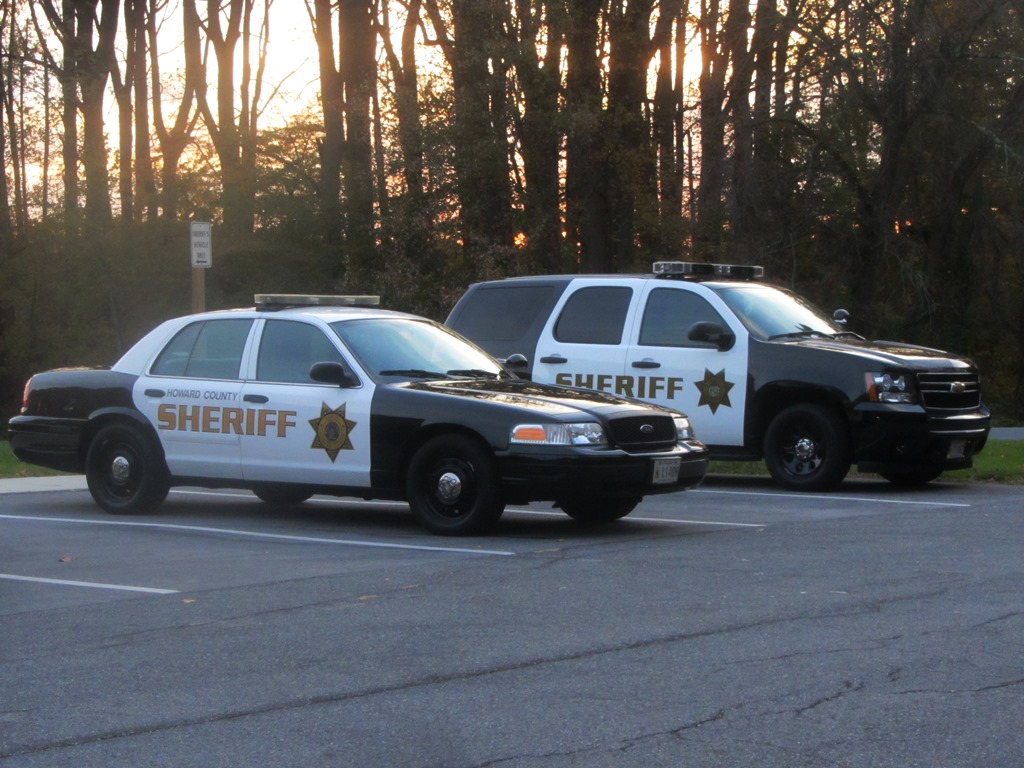
Howard County Sheriff's Office fleet in 2014

Anne Arundel County created the Howard District in 1831 from its western half. Thomas Burgess acted as the sheriff through the 1840s. In 1851, the Howard District became its own county with a dedicated sheriff. The HCSO was created in 1851. Former Ellicott City Mayor E.A. Talbot served in 1856; George W. Howard in 1908; Julius Wolsh Jr. in 1928; George D. Day Jr. in 1930; Norman O. Haward in 1962; Donald Edward Ansell in 1972.

Sheriff James F. Fitzgerald resigned in 2016 over allegations that he had bullied his employees and made racist, sexist, and antisemitic remarks.

== Organization ==
The Sheriff's Office is located at the Howard County Circuit Court building, 9250 Judicial Way, Ellicott City, Maryland. The current sheriff is Marcus Harris, a former Baltimore County Police detective, elected in November 2018. The HCSO is divided into six sections:

- Domestic Violence Enforcement
- Warrants/Fugitive
- Courthouse Security
- Landlord/Tenant
- Transportation
- Patrol Operations

== Past sheriffs ==
Sheriff	Term
Charles G. Halsup	1848–1851
Seth W. Warfield	1851–1853
E.A. Talbot	1853–1855
Joshua McCauley	1855–1857
John Orem	1857–1859
Thomas Burgess	1859–1861
J.P. Ijams	1861–1863
David E. Hopkins	1864–1866
Edward McCaulley	1866–1867
William A. Webb	1867–1869
Claudius Stewart	1869–1871
John S. Tracy	1871–1873
Walter Dorsey	1873–1875
G. Washington Carr	1875–1877
Joseph Hunt	1877–1879
Joseph McCauley	1879–1881
Edward A. Talbott	1881–1883
N.T. Hutchins	1883–1885
Frank Shipley	1885–1887
George D. Day	1887–1889
Steven R. Hobbs	1889–1891
William G. Owings	1891–1893
Gilbert E. Flower	1893–1895
Greenbury Johnson Jr.	1895–1896
Frank Oldfield	1896–1897
Charles D. Pickett	1897–1899
Lewis E. Phelps	1899–1901
James E. Hobbs	1901–1903
John F. Kyrne	1903–1905
Joseph Hunt	1905–1907
George W Howard	1907–1909
James L. Hobbs	1909–1911
Sandy T. Mullinix	1911–1913
John V. Long	1913–1915
James L. Hobbs	1915–1917
H. Thomas Grimes	1917–1919
James H. Hudson	1919–1920
Arthur A. Brosenne	1921–1923
Phillip S. Brown	1923–1926
John H. Hardy	1926–1930
George D, Day Jr.	1930–1934
J. Frank Curtis	1934–1938
C. Dorsey Hobbs	1938–1942
L. Edwin Carr	1942–1946
Frederick C. Kramer	1946–1950
W. Harvey Hill	1950–1958
Norman O. Howard	1958–1970
Charles C. Senseney	1970–1974
John J. Votta	1974–1982
Virginia L. Donnelly	1982–1986
Herbert Stonesifer	1986–1990
Michael A. Chiuchiolo	1990–1998
Charles M. Cave	1998–2006
James F. Fitzgerald	2006–2016
William J. McMahon	2016–2018
Marcus R. Harris	2018–present

== See also ==
- List of law enforcement agencies in Maryland
