= Howard County Department of Corrections =

Howard County Police Department
- Abbreviation: HCPD
- Motto: persons. To provide for the safety of inmates and staff while maintaining a humane living and working environment. To provide a range of inmate services through medical and treatment programs and to comply with all State of Maryland mandated standards.

Agency overview
- Formed: 1975

Jurisdictional structure
- Operations jurisdiction: Maryland, USA
- Map of Howard County Police Department's jurisdiction
- Area: 252.04 square miles
- Population: 272,452

Operational structure
- Headquarters: Jessup, Maryland; 39°16′35″N 76°48′23″W

Notables
- Person: Jack Kavanagh, Director

The Howard County Department of Corrections (HCDC) is the corrections agency servicing 3500 arrests within 252.04 square miles (652.8 km^{2}) of Howard County, Maryland yearly.

== History ==
Corrections in Howard County was handled through the county police. The first institution built was the twelve person Ellicott City Jail in 1878. In 1975 a separate division was created by County Executive Edward L. Cochran. Its first director was Gerald H. McClellan.

== Organization ==
The department operates the following facilities:

Central Booking Center
Housed at Waterloo southern Police barracks. Moved to Jessup facility opened 28 March 2005
Central Detention Facility
Opened in 1983 with a capacity of 108 inmates. In 1994 the facility was expanded to 361 inmates.

In 2009, the department took over operations of the Howard County Community Service Program, subcontracting to the Serenity Center.

== See also ==
- Howard County Police Department
- List of law enforcement agencies in Maryland
