= Hagen House =

House in Ellicott City, Maryland, US

Omar Jones / Hagen House
- Interactive map of the Omar Jones / Hagen House area
- Former names: Hagen House

General information
- Type: Mid-19th century stone
- Location: 4075 Old Columbia Pike Ellicott City, Maryland
- Coordinates: 39.25852°N 76.815669°W
- Construction started: 1845

Design and construction
- Developer: Willima (Curley) Davis

Hagen House, or Omar Jones House is a historic home located in Ellicott City, Maryland. It is a two-story stone house constructed in the mid-19th century. The home is associated with Omar J. Jones, a prominent Howard County politician and school teacher, who championed the charter form of government for Howard County.

The building was built by William Davis for his three sisters in 1845. It was built along the original Columbia turnpike road between Washington and Ellicott City, and is noted on Hopkins 1878 Atlas. Tall vertical windows were added in 1890. The house was later owned by the Josephine Ray and Harry J Bloom, Clara Klashaus, Caleb and Elizabeth Rogers, Joseph and Ella Mae Howes, H. Deets Warfield and P. Stanly Gault. The Gault family and Jones family restored the house reducing the three sided porch to one side.

== Omar J. Jones ==
Omar J. Jones lived at the residence when he created the charter form of government. The charter form of government created a county council and executive that could manage major county functions independent of the state legislature and governor. A former principal of the Lisbon school, he was the first executive of Howard County and responsible for many of the changes required to manage Rouse planned community development Columbia, Maryland.

The Hagen House is situated just outside the boundaries of the dense Columbia development, but has been subdivided to a half acre parcel surrounded by single family home development.

The house is fieldstone construction, three bays wide by one bay deep and is two stories high of stone construction with one side covered in wood siding.
