= Dayton, Maryland =

Unincorporated community in Maryland, United States

- Location in Maryland
- Coordinates: 39°17′38″N 77°4′8″W
- Country: United States of America
- State: Maryland
- County: Howard
- Established: pre 1864
- Elevation: 551 ft (168 m)

Population
  - Total: 2,114
- Time zone: UTC-5 (EST)
  - Summer (DST): UTC-4 (EDT)
- Area code: 240 and 301

Dayton is an unincorporated community located in Howard County, Maryland, United States.

Dayton is located southwest of Baltimore and north of Washington, D.C., between Clarksville and Glenelg.

== History ==
A postal office operated in the community from 21 July 1864 to present with brief stops in service during the American Civil War. By 1878, the town expanded to three general stores and a wheelwright shop. One of the former is Maloney's General Store, built shortly after the Civil War, which served as a stagecoach stop and was later owned by Royal Harp III, Thomas Isaacs, Mr White, and the Grant family.

The Dayton single-room school house was located along Green Bridge Road. After a fire in the single-room schoolhouse for colored children, a new brown tile two-room school was built at the crossroads of Ten Oaks, Green Bridge and Howard roads, and the colored children moved to the old white school. The two-room school is now on property owned by RLO Contractors.

== Modern Dayton ==
Dayton is in the 21036 zip code area and belongs to the 410 area code. The post office is still operating today.

Dayton is also the home to the annual Dayton Daze Parade that began in honor of Lenny Hobbs. The Hobbs Family gas station was prominent in the crossroads community.

The 21036 zip code is the wealthiest in the Baltimore metropolitan area as of 2013, with an average family net worth of $1.85 million, and is listed as a "super" zip code. The median home value was $975,000 in 2016, with an average home size of 3,410 square feet.

In 2014, a zoning case to move a large industrial mulching operation operated by a Sandy Spring Bank executive and RLO president from Trinity Church in Elkridge to agricultural preservation land in Dayton prompted a large citizen reaction.
