= Ernie Pickett =

American weightlifter (1936–2009)

Personal information
- Born: George Ernest Pickett; June 27, 1936 Sykesville, Maryland, United States
- Died: July 1, 2009 (aged 73) Florida, United States

Sport
- Sport: Weightlifting

George Ernest Pickett (June 27, 1936 – July 1, 2009) was an American weightlifter. Ernie Pickett competed as a heavyweight weightlifter at the 1968 Olympics. He was first at the US YMCA Championships in 1968 and placed second at the US Olympic Trials. In February 1968 Pickett set a world record for the press with 202.0 kg, and later in the year hoisted 207.5 kg which bettered the world record, but was not ratified. Pickett was also quite good at power lifting, winning multiple titles in that version of weightlifting.

Ernie Pickett of the late 60s was a great all round Olympic and power lifter. He was listed in various publications of being between 6' 5" and 6' 7". Many put him at a fraction under 6' 6".

His best Olympic lifts were done at the 1968 OL trials where he pressed 457 (world record), snatch 345 (done earlier in 1968 in Chicago), C&J 462 (at trials). In the 1968 Senior National Power lifting he did a 450 bench, 600 squat (took only 2 attempts and went really deep), and a 750 dead lift (only 2 attempts taken here also).

Bill Starr considered that Pickett's 750 lb deadlift at the 1968 Powerlifting Senior Nationals was so easy, that if he hadn't been in the midst of preparing for his participation at the 1968 Mexico City Olympics then Ernie could well have become the first man in history that day to deadlift 800 lbs in official competition."
