= Charles Schnetzler =

American planetary scientist (1930–2009)

Charles Carter Schnetzler (June 3, 1930 – December 15, 2009) was a planetary scientist at NASA's Goddard Space Flight Center. Schnetzler is best known for analyzing Moon rocks brought back by the Apollo program and for studying the Earth's environment using the Landsat and the Earth Observing System. Schnetzler was born in Whiting, Indiana, and grew up in Neodesha, Kansas. On November 4, 2009, Schnetzler was seriously injured after being hit by a motorist while walking near his home on Little Patuxent Parkway in Columbia, Maryland. He later died in his home on December 15, 2009.

== Selected publications ==
- James B. Garvin; Susan E. H. Sakimoto; James J. Frawley; Charles Schnetzler (April 2000). "North Polar Region Craterforms on Mars: Geometric Characteristics from the Mars Orbiter Laser Altimeter" (PDF). Icarus. 144 (2): 329–352. Bibcode:2000Icar..144..329G. doi:10.1006/icar.1999.6298. Archived from the original (PDF) on May 27, 2010.
- Fiske, P. S.; Schnetzler, C. C.; McHone, J.; Chanthavaichith, K. K.; Homsombath, I.; Phouthakayalat, T. (1999). "Layered tektites of Southeast Asia: Field studies in Central Laos and Vietnam". Meteoritics & Planetary Science. 34 (5): 757–762. Bibcode:1999M&PS...34..757F. doi:10.1111/j.1945-5100.1999.tb01388.x.
- Schnetzler C. C.; Mchone J.F. (1996). "Source of Australasian tektites: Investigating possible impact sites in Laos". Meteoritics and Planetary Science. 31 (1): 73–76. Bibcode:1996M&PS...31...73S. doi:10.1111/j.1945-5100.1996.tb02055.x.
