= Isaacsville, Maryland =

Unincorporated community in Maryland, United States

- Location within Maryland Location within the United States
- Coordinates: 39°15′50″N 76°59′34″W
- Country: United States of America
- State: Maryland
- County: Howard
- Time zone: UTC-5 (Eastern (EST))
  - Summer (DST): UTC-4 (EDT)

Isaacsville is a town located in western Howard County in the state of Maryland, United States.

The postal community is the site of Eganor, a large farm founded by Joseph Isaacs in 1840.
