= List of mountains in Maryland =

This is a list of mountains in the U.S. state of Maryland.

== By mountain range ==
This list is arranged by mountain ranges.

=== Ridge-and-Valley Appalachians ===
Listed alphabetically by county

==== Garrett County ====
- Backbone Mountain (3,360 ft.)
  - Hoye-Crest
- Blossom Hill (2,620 ft.)
- Contrary Knob (2,680 ft.)
- Conway Hill (2,760 ft.)
- Dung Hill (2,732 ft.)
- Elder Hill (2,826 ft.)
- Fort Hill (2,600 ft.)
- George Mountain (3,004 ft.)
- Lewis Knob (2,960 ft.)
- Little Mountain (2,920 ft.)
- Marsh Hill (3,073 ft.)
- Mount Nebo (2,604 ft.)
- Negro Mountain (3,075 ft.)
- Pine Hill (2,500 ft.)
- Rich Hill (2,842 ft.)
- Ridgley Hill (2,617 ft.)
- River Hill (2,700 ft.)
- Roman Nose Mountain (3,140 ft.)
- Roth Rock Mountain (2,860 ft.)
- Salt Block Mountain (2,707 ft.)
- Savage Mountain (2,870 ft.)
  - Meadow Mountain (2,959 ft.)
  - Elbow Mountain (2,730 ft.)
  - Little Savage Mountain (2,818 ft.)
  - Mount Aetna (2,598 ft.)
  - High Rock (2,986 ft.)
  - Big Savage Mountain (2,982 ft.)
- Snaggy Hill (3,040 ft.)
- Walnut Hill (2,629 ft.)
- Winding Ridge (2,775 ft.)
- Whites Knob (2,940 ft.)
- Zehner Hill (3,000 ft.)

==== Allegany County ====
- Breakneck Hill (1,872 ft.)
- Collier Mountain (1,460 ft.)
- Dans Mountain (2,898 ft.)
- Evitts Mountain (1,959-2,260 ft.)
- Haystack Mountain (1,706 ft.)
- Martin Mountain (1,974 ft.)
- Nicholas Mountain (1,760 ft.)
- Polish Mountain (1,783 ft.)
- Ragged Mountain (1,740 ft.)
- Town Hill (2,039 ft.)
- Warrior Mountain (2,185 ft.)
- Wills Mountain (1,960+ ft.)

==== Washington County ====
- Roundtop Hill (1,388 ft.)
- Sideling Hill (1,760 ft.)
- Tonoloway Ridge (1,220 ft.)

==== Bear Pond Mountains ====
- Abe Mills Mountain (1,360 ft.)
- Boyd Mountain (980 ft.)
- Bullskin Mountain (1,530 ft.)
- Fairview Mountain (1,690 ft.)
- Hearthstone Mountain (2,021 ft.)
- Johnson Mountain (1,120 ft.)
- Rickard Mountain (1,480 ft.)
- Powell Mountain (1,548 ft.)
- Sword Mountain (1,530+ ft.)

=== Blue Ridge Mountains ===
==== South Mountain ====
- Bartman Hill, (1,400 ft.)
- Buzzard Knob, (1,520 ft.)
- Lambs Knoll, (1,758 ft.)
- Monument Knob, (1,540 ft.)
- Pine Knob, (1,714 ft.)
- Quirauk Mountain, (2,150 ft.)
- Short Hill (1,080 ft.)

==== Catoctin Mountain ====
- Bob's Hill (1,747 ft.)
- Carrick Knob (1,629 ft.)
- Cascade Miller Hill (1,374 ft.)
- Catoctin Summit (1,910 ft.)
- Eagle Mountain (1,680 ft.)
- High Knob (1,531 ft.)
- Little Piney Mountain (1,304 ft.)
- Piney Mountain (1,691 ft.)
- Pine Rock (1,200 ft)
- Point of Rocks (680 ft)
- Round Top Mountain (1,702 ft.)

==== Elk Ridge ====
- Maryland Heights (1,460 ft.)
- Elk Ridge Summit (1,476 ft.)

==== Foot Hills ====
- Red Hill (1,020 ft)
- Hawks Hill (930 ft)

=== Monadnocks ===
- Sugarloaf Mountain(1,282 ft.)
- Bud Hill (1,000 ft.)

== See also ==
- List of mountains of the Appalachians
