= Town Creek =

Town Creek may refer to the following places in the United States:

== Communities ==
- Town Creek, Alabama, a town in Lawrence County
- Town Creek, Dallas, Texas, a neighborhood in the Lake Highlands area
- Town Creek, Maryland, an unincorporated community in Allegany County

== Waterways ==
- Town Creek (Mississippi), a tributary stream of the Tombigbee River
- Town Creek (Chestatee River tributary), a tributary of Tesnatee Creek in Georgia
- Town Creek (Talking Rock Creek tributary), a stream in Georgia
- Town Creek (Withlacoochee River tributary), a stream in Georgia
- Town Creek (Patuxent River), a tributary of the Patuxent River in Saint Mary's County, Maryland
- Town Creek (Potomac River), a tributary of the Potomac River in Maryland and Pennsylvania
- Town Creek (Tred Avon River), a tributary of the Tred Avon River, Talbot County, Maryland
- Town Creek (Hatchie River), a tributary of the Hatchie River, Tipton County Tennessee

== Other ==
- Town Creek Indian Mound, a National Historic Landmark in North Carolina

== See also ==
- Blood Creek, a 2009 Joel Schumacher horror film also known as Town Creek
