= 1896 United States presidential election in Maryland =

- November 3, 1896

Nominee	William McKinley	William Jennings Bryan
Party	Republican	Democratic
Home state	Ohio	Nebraska
Running mate	Garret Hobart	Arthur Sewall
Electoral vote	8	0
Popular vote	136,959	104,150
Percentage	54.73%	41.62%
County results
McKinley
40–50%
50–60%
60–70%
Bryan
40–50%
50–60%
President before election
Grover Cleveland
Democratic
Elected President
William McKinley
Republican

The 1896 United States presidential election in Maryland took place on November 3, 1896. All contemporary 45 states were part of the 1896 United States presidential election. States voters chose eight electors to the Electoral College, which selected the president and vice president.

Maryland was won by the Republican nominees, former Ohio Governor William McKinley and his running mate Garret Hobart of New Jersey. They defeated the Democratic nominee, former U.S. Representative from Nebraska William Jennings Bryan and his running mate Arthur Sewall. McKinley won the state by a margin of 13.11%.

This was the first time that a Republican presidential candidate won Maryland since Abraham Lincoln in 1864 and the Democrats would not win the state's popular vote until Woodrow Wilson in 1912.

In this election, Maryland voted 8.8% more Republican than the nation at-large.

Bryan would lose Maryland to McKinley again four years later. In 1908, he would lose the popular vote to William Howard Taft but would win the electoral vote.

== Results ==
1896 United States presidential election in Maryland
Party	Candidate	Votes	Percentage	Electoral votes
Republican	William McKinley	136,959	54.73%	8
Democratic	William Jennings Bryan	101,763	40.67%	0
Populist	William Jennings Bryan	2,387	0.95%	0
Total	William Jennings Bryan	104,150	41.62%	0
Prohibition	Joshua Levering	5,918	2.36%	0
National Democratic	John M. Palmer	2,499	1.00%	0
Socialist Labor	Charles H. Matchett	587	0.23%	0
National Prohibition	Charles Eugene Bentley	136	0.05%	0
Totals		250,249	100.00%	8
Voter turnout				—

=== Results by county ===
County	William McKinley Republican		William Jennings Bryan Democratic		Joshua Levering Prohibition		John McAuley Palmer National Democratic		Various candidates Other parties		Margin		Total votes cast
County	#	%	#	%	#	%	#	%	#	%	#	%	Total votes cast
Allegany	5,464	56.45%	3,907	40.36%	236	2.44%	57	0.59%	16	0.17%	1,557	16.08%	9,680
Anne Arundel	4,030	54.88%	3,145	42.83%	115	1.57%	48	0.65%	5	0.07%	885	12.05%	7,343
Baltimore	9,211	53.59%	7,110	41.37%	512	2.98%	280	1.63%	75	0.44%	2,101	12.22%	17,188
Baltimore City	61,965	58.13%	40,859	38.33%	1,903	1.79%	1,350	1.27%	524	0.49%	21,106	19.80%	106,601
Calvert	1,294	57.95%	881	39.45%	49	2.19%	6	0.27%	3	0.13%	413	18.50%	2,233
Caroline	1,686	48.45%	1,651	47.44%	110	3.16%	25	0.72%	8	0.23%	35	1.01%	3,480
Carroll	4,047	49.72%	3,841	47.19%	209	2.57%	35	0.43%	8	0.10%	206	2.53%	8,140
Cecil	3,128	50.21%	2,908	46.68%	99	1.59%	88	1.41%	7	0.11%	220	3.53%	6,230
Charles	2,117	59.99%	1,372	38.88%	22	0.62%	14	0.40%	4	0.11%	745	21.11%	3,529
Dorchester	3,048	52.24%	2,638	45.21%	127	2.18%	16	0.27%	6	0.10%	410	7.03%	5,835
Frederick	6,352	53.20%	5,214	43.67%	279	2.34%	88	0.74%	7	0.06%	1,138	9.53%	11,940
Garrett	2,058	60.67%	1,277	37.65%	41	1.21%	14	0.41%	2	0.06%	781	23.02%	3,392
Harford	3,374	47.49%	3,360	47.29%	292	4.11%	73	1.03%	6	0.08%	14	0.20%	7,105
Howard	1,981	51.19%	1,786	46.15%	59	1.52%	36	0.93%	8	0.21%	195	5.04%	3,870
Kent	2,399	53.73%	1,980	44.34%	78	1.75%	8	0.18%	0	0.00%	419	9.38%	4,465
Montgomery	3,219	47.02%	3,456	50.48%	108	1.58%	57	0.83%	6	0.09%	-237	-3.46%	6,846
Prince George's	3,250	55.94%	2,505	43.12%	25	0.43%	28	0.48%	2	0.03%	745	12.82%	5,810
Queen Anne's	1,917	41.53%	2,516	54.51%	143	3.10%	32	0.69%	8	0.17%	-599	-12.98%	4,616
Somerset	2,646	50.80%	2,084	40.01%	451	8.66%	15	0.29%	13	0.25%	562	10.79%	5,209
St. Mary's	2,044	57.56%	1,471	41.42%	19	0.54%	15	0.42%	2	0.06%	573	16.14%	3,551
Talbot	2,542	51.50%	2,189	44.35%	151	3.06%	50	1.01%	4	0.08%	353	7.15%	4,936
Washington	5,428	53.57%	4,382	43.24%	197	1.94%	114	1.13%	12	0.12%	1,046	10.32%	10,133
Wicomico	2,022	43.75%	2,253	48.75%	314	6.79%	30	0.65%	3	0.06%	-231	-5.00%	4,622
Worcester	1,756	42.59%	1,961	47.56%	379	9.19%	20	0.49%	7	0.17%	-205	-4.97%	4,123
Totals	136,978	54.60%	104,746	41.75%	5,918	2.36%	2,499	1.00%	736	0.29%	32,232	12.85%	250,877

==== Counties that flipped from Democratic to Republican ====
- Anne Arundel
- Baltimore (County)
- Baltimore (City)
- Caroline
- Carroll
- Cecil
- Frederick
- Harford
- Howard
- Kent
- Prince George's
- Washington

== See also ==
- United States presidential elections in Maryland
- 1896 United States presidential election
- 1896 United States elections
