= Polish Mountain Hillclimb =

The Polish Mountain Hillclimb is a racing event in Flintstone, Maryland sanctioned by the Washington, D.C. region of the Sports Car Club of America and operated under the SCCA regulations as a Level 4 Time Trial event, as part of the Pennsylvania Hillclimb Association. Traditionally, the first night of the three-day festivities consists of a car show with the next two days being the time trials. The inaugural event was held the weekend of August 3–5, 2007, and the most recently organized race was announced for August 6–7, 2022.
