= Polish Mountain =

Coordinates: 39°40′3.9″N 78°32′15.3″W

Polish Mountain /ˈpɒlɪʃ/ is located in Allegany County, Maryland, United States. It borders on Town Creek Tributary on the east, north of Town Creek, and extending northeastward into Pennsylvania. Its highest elevation is 1,800 feet (550 m).

In February 2011, nine Maryland State Senators introduced a bill to rename Polish Mountain and Negro Mountain. All four Western Maryland state representatives testified against the proposed bill. The bill was voted down in committee.
