= Breakneck Road Historic District =

Historic district in Maryland, United States

- U.S. National Register of Historic Places
- U.S. Historic district
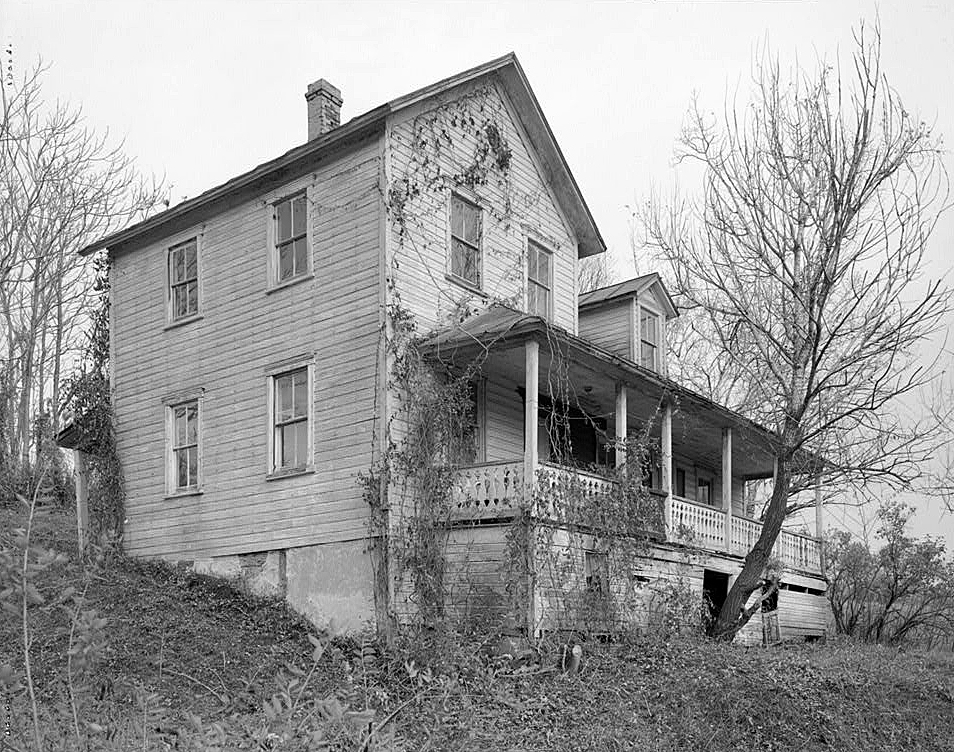
- William House residence in the 20th century

- Location within Maryland Location within the United States
- Nearest city: Flintstone, Maryland
- Coordinates: 39°40′40″N 78°36′45″W
- Area: 6,270 acres (2,540 ha)
- Built by: Wilson, Harvey; Et al.
- NRHP reference No.: 80001777
- Added to NRHP: May 29, 1980

The Breakneck Road Historic District is a rural agricultural landscape near Flintstone, Allegany County, Maryland. The farms and their associated lands have remained in the possession of a small number of families since the time of their settlement.

It was listed on the National Register of Historic Places in 1980.
