= Martin Ridge =

Martin Ridge may refer to:

- Martin Ridge, Mount Kirkpatrick, a broad ice-covered ridge
- Martin Ridge (historian) (1923–2003), American historian

== See also ==
- Martin Mountain Ridge, a ridge located in Allegany County, Maryland
- Martin Ridge Cave System, a large cave near Mammoth Cave, Kentucky
