= Georges Creek, Maryland =

Unincorporated community in Maryland, United States

Georges Creek
- Unincorporated community
- Location within Maryland Location within the United States
- Coordinates: 39°41′52″N 78°51′12″W
- Country: United States
- State: Maryland
- County: Allegany
- Elevation: 1,034 ft (315 m)
- Time zone: UTC-5 (Eastern (EST))
  - Summer (DST): UTC-4 (EDT)
- GNIS feature ID: 590289

Georges Creek is an unincorporated community in Allegany County, Maryland, United States. It lies within Georges Creek Valley.
