= Amcelle, Maryland =

Unincorporated community in Maryland, United States

- Unincorporated community
- Location within the State of Maryland Amcelle, Maryland (the United States)
- Coordinates: 39°36′28″N 78°48′55″W
- Country: United States
- State: Maryland
- County: Allegany
- Elevation: 650 ft (200 m)
- Time zone: UTC−5 (Eastern (EST))
  - Summer (DST): UTC−4 (EDT)
- GNIS feature ID: 589640

Amcelle is an unincorporated community in Allegany County, Maryland, United States.
