= 1900 United States presidential election in Maryland =

- November 6, 1900
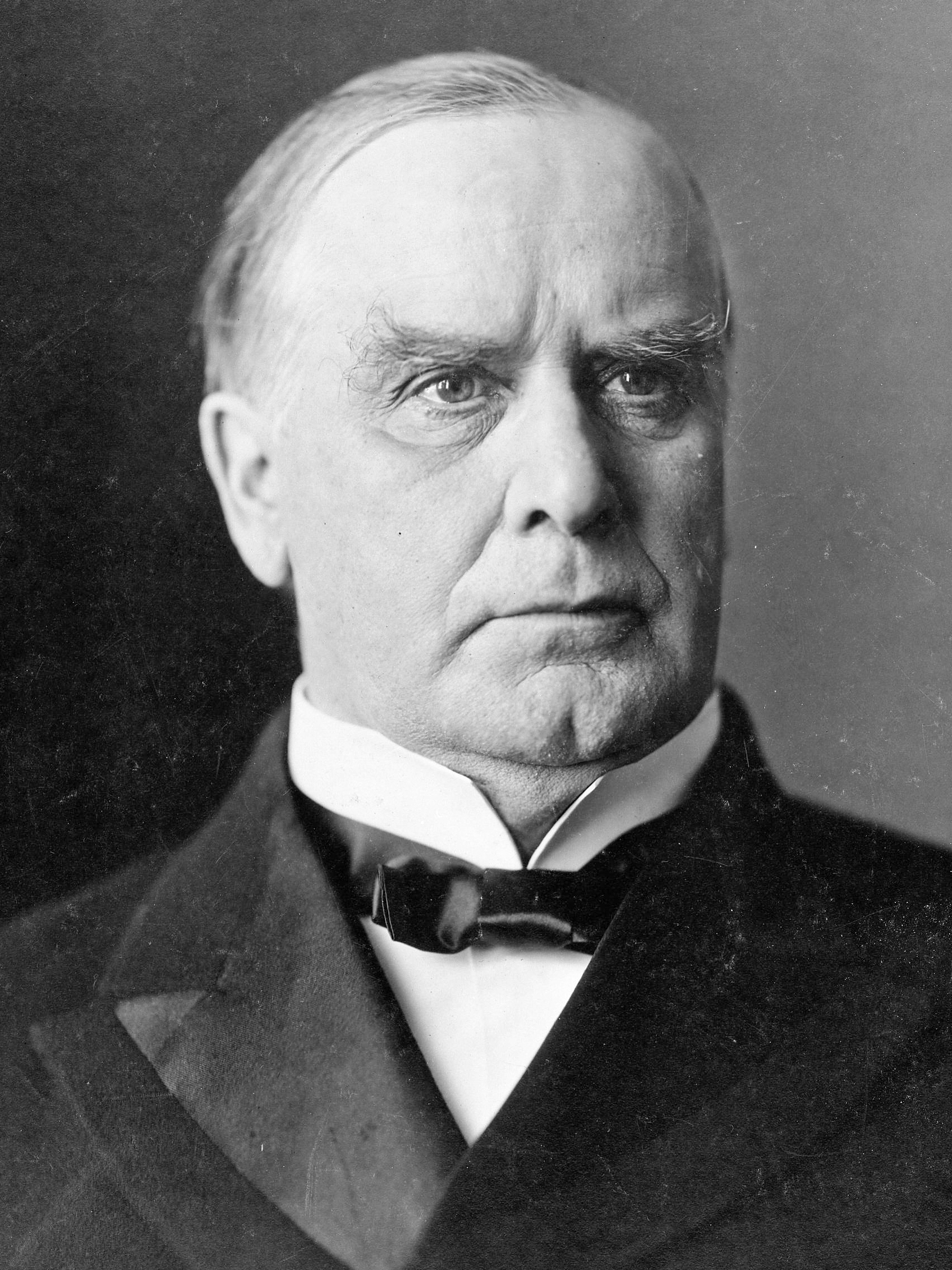

Nominee	William McKinley	William Jennings Bryan
Party	Republican	Democratic
Home state	Ohio	Nebraska
Running mate	Theodore Roosevelt	Adlai Stevenson I
Electoral vote	8	0
Popular vote	136,185	122,238
Percentage	51.50%	46.23%
County results
McKinley
40–50%
50–60%
60–70%
Bryan
40–50%
50–60%
President before election
William McKinley
Republican
Elected President
William McKinley
Republican

The 1900 United States presidential election in Maryland took place on November 6, 1900. All contemporary 45 states were part of the 1900 United States presidential election. Maryland voters chose eight electors to the Electoral College, which selected the president and vice president.

Maryland was won by the Republican nominees, incumbent President William McKinley of Ohio and his running mate Theodore Roosevelt of New York. They defeated the Democratic nominees, former U.S. Representative and 1896 Democratic presidential nominee William Jennings Bryan and his running mate, former Vice President Adlai Stevenson I. McKinley won the state by a margin of 5.27% in this rematch of the 1896 presidential election. The return of economic prosperity and recent victory in the Spanish–American War helped McKinley to score a decisive victory.

As of 2024, this remains the last time Howard County and Baltimore County voted for different candidates.

In this election, Maryland voted 0.85% more Democratic than the nation at-large.

Bryan had previous lost Maryland to McKinley four years earlier. In 1908, he would lose the popular vote to William Howard Taft, but would win the electoral vote.

== Results ==
1900 United States presidential election in Maryland
Party	Candidate	Votes	Percentage	Electoral votes
Republican	William McKinley (incumbent)	136,185	51.50%	8
Democratic	William Jennings Bryan	122,238	46.23%	0
Prohibition	John G. Woolley	4,574	1.73%	0
Social Democratic	Eugene V. Debs	904	0.34%	0
Socialist Labor	Joseph F. Malloney	388	0.15%	0
Union Reform	Seth H. Ellis	145	0.05%	0
Totals		264,434	100.00%	8
Voter turnout				—

=== Results by county ===
County	William McKinley Republican		William Jennings Bryan Democratic		John Granville Woolley Prohibition		Various candidates Other parties		Margin		Total votes cast
County	#	%	#	%	#	%	#	%	#	%	Total votes cast
Allegany	5,944	54.63%	4,527	41.61%	283	2.60%	126	1.16%	1,417	13.02%	10,880
Anne Arundel	4,045	54.32%	3,297	44.28%	103	1.38%	1	0.01%	748	10.05%	7,446
Baltimore	9,348	49.23%	9,147	48.18%	350	1.84%	142	0.75%	201	1.06%	18,987
Baltimore City	58,880	52.10%	51,979	46.00%	1,259	1.11%	890	0.79%	6,901	6.11%	113,008
Calvert	1,414	60.97%	865	37.30%	36	1.55%	4	0.17%	549	23.67%	2,319
Caroline	1,796	48.27%	1,774	47.68%	139	3.74%	12	0.32%	22	0.59%	3,721
Carroll	4,103	49.20%	4,022	48.23%	189	2.27%	26	0.31%	81	0.97%	8,340
Cecil	2,959	48.78%	2,988	49.26%	95	1.57%	24	0.40%	-29	-0.48%	6,066
Charles	2,268	61.93%	1,368	37.36%	19	0.52%	7	0.19%	900	24.58%	3,662
Dorchester	3,366	53.93%	2,733	43.78%	128	2.05%	15	0.24%	633	10.14%	6,242
Frederick	6,391	51.30%	5,820	46.72%	216	1.73%	30	0.24%	571	4.58%	12,457
Garrett	2,259	63.10%	1,283	35.84%	30	0.84%	8	0.22%	976	27.26%	3,580
Harford	3,145	45.42%	3,509	50.68%	250	3.61%	20	0.29%	-364	-5.26%	6,924
Howard	1,800	47.58%	1,904	50.33%	72	1.90%	7	0.19%	-104	-2.75%	3,783
Kent	2,426	53.05%	2,076	45.40%	64	1.40%	7	0.15%	350	7.65%	4,573
Montgomery	3,354	46.90%	3,677	51.42%	102	1.43%	18	0.25%	-323	-4.52%	7,151
Prince George's	3,455	55.02%	2,787	44.39%	26	0.41%	11	0.18%	668	10.64%	6,279
Queen Anne's	1,873	41.27%	2,544	56.06%	113	2.49%	8	0.18%	-671	-14.79%	4,538
Somerset	2,855	54.68%	2,017	38.63%	316	6.05%	33	0.63%	838	16.05%	5,221
St. Mary's	2,089	56.52%	1,584	42.86%	17	0.46%	6	0.16%	505	13.66%	3,696
Talbot	2,573	51.70%	2,233	44.87%	161	3.23%	10	0.20%	340	6.83%	4,977
Washington	5,475	52.04%	4,862	46.22%	154	1.46%	29	0.28%	613	5.83%	10,520
Wicomico	2,376	44.21%	2,793	51.97%	205	3.81%	0	0.00%	-417	-7.76%	5,374
Worcester	1,991	42.45%	2,449	52.22%	247	5.27%	3	0.06%	-458	-9.77%	4,690
Totals	136,185	51.50%	122,238	46.23%	4,574	1.73%	1,437	0.54%	13,947	5.27%	264,434

==== Counties that flipped from Republican to Democratic ====
- Cecil
- Harford
- Howard

== See also ==
- United States presidential elections in Maryland
- 1900 United States presidential election
- 1900 United States elections
