= Bowmans Addition, Maryland =

- Census-designated place
- Location within the State of Maryland Bowmans Addition, Maryland (the United States)
- Coordinates: 39°41′20″N 78°45′08″W
- Country: United States
- State: Maryland
- County: Allegany

Area
  - Total: 1.12 sq mi (2.90 km^{2})
  - Land: 1.12 sq mi (2.90 km^{2})
  - Water: 0 sq mi (0.00 km^{2})
- Elevation: 922 ft (281 m)

Population (2020)
  - Total: 584
  - Density: 521.6/sq mi (201.39/km^{2})
- Time zone: UTC−5 (Eastern (EST))
  - Summer (DST): UTC−4 (EDT)
- ZIP code: 21502
- Area codes: 240 and 301
- FIPS code: 24-08862
- GNIS feature ID: 2583588

Bowmans Addition is an unincorporated community and census-designated place (CDP) in Allegany County, Maryland, United States. As of the 2020 census it had a population of 584. It is located north of Cumberland in a valley bounded by Wills Mountain to the northwest and Shriver Ridge to the southeast.

== Demographics ==
Historical population
Census	Pop.	Note	%±
2010	627		—
2020	584		−6.9%
U.S. Decennial Census
