= 1908 United States presidential election in Maryland =

- November 3, 1908
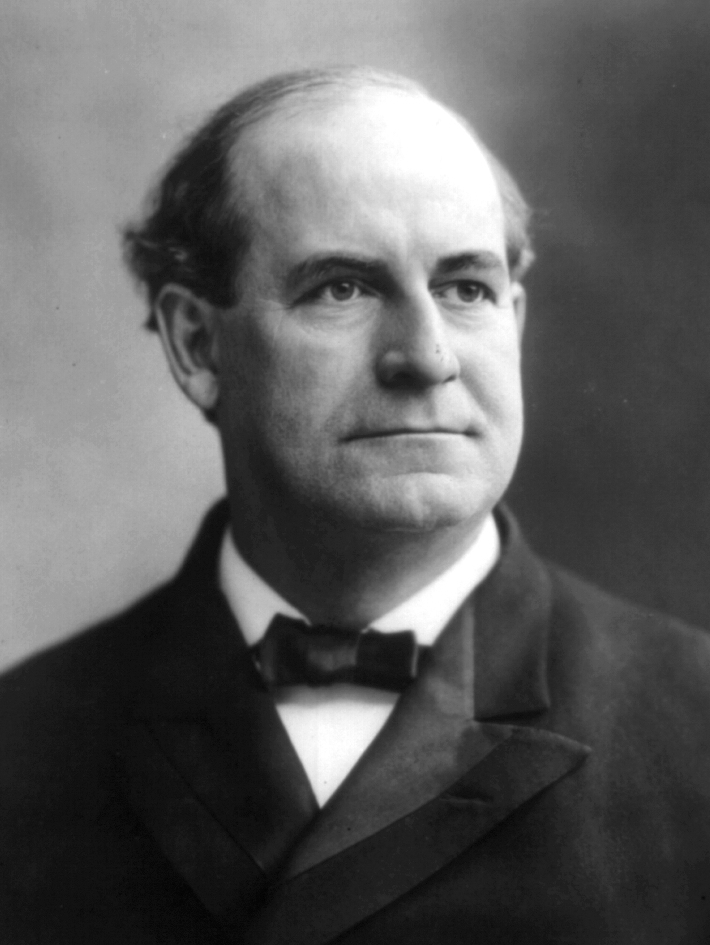

Nominee	William Jennings Bryan	William Howard Taft
Party	Democratic	Republican
Home state	Nebraska	Ohio
Running mate	John W. Kern	James S. Sherman
Electoral vote	6 (Note: Six of the eight highest electors were for Bryan, but the highest Taft elector had 605 more votes than the highest Bryan elector.)	2
Popular vote	115,908	116,513
Percentage	48.59%	48.85%
County results
Bryan
40–50%
50–60%
60–70%
Taft
40–50%
50–60%
60–70%
President before election
Theodore Roosevelt
Republican
Elected President
William Howard Taft
Republican

The 1908 United States presidential election in Maryland took place on November 3, 1908. All contemporary 46 states were part of the 1908 United States presidential election. State voters chose eight electors to the Electoral College, which selected the president and vice president.

After having voted for Republican William McKinley in 1896 and 1900, Maryland would become exceedingly close in 1904 with Alton B. Parker taking 7 of 8 electoral votes despite the highest Theodore Roosevelt elector beating any of Parker's by 51 votes. Large-scale immigration and efforts to reduce the solidly Republican Black vote were opposed for this election by dislike of William Jennings Bryan's populism in this urbanizing state. At first, the latter trend appeared to be strong, and by the middle of September Taft's campaign managers thought Maryland was safe in his pocket, although Bryan had campaigned in the state a few days previously. This trend continued into early October as Roosevelt's war on Samuel Gompers was believed a major aid to Taft. However, a new poll in the second week of October suggested the state could go to Bryan by 15,000 votes. By election day, it was clear that Maryland would be almost as close as the 1904 election had proved.

Maryland was won by the Democratic nominees, former Representative William Jennings Bryan of Nebraska and his running mate John W. Kern of Indiana, although the highest elector for Republican candidates William Howard Taft and James S. Sherman gained 605 more votes than the highest Bryan elector. This difference was supposedly due to the “Wilson Law” designed to make it easier for Democrats to cast ballots for both Presidential electors and Congress by a simple turning down of a single fold in the ballot paper.

In this election, Maryland voted 8.28% more Democratic than the nation at-large.

== Results ==
General Election Results
Party	Pledged to	Elector	Votes
Republican Party	William Howard Taft	John A. Robinson	116,513
Democratic Party	William Jennings Bryan	James Enos Ray, Jr.	115,908
Democratic Party	William Jennings Bryan	James W. Denny	114,161
Democratic Party	William Jennings Bryan	Edwin H. Brown Jr.	113,930
Democratic Party	William Jennings Bryan	John F. Williams	113,877
Democratic Party	William Jennings Bryan	J. Charles Linthicum	113,823
Republican Party	William Howard Taft	Albert G. Towers	113,803
Democratic Party	William Jennings Bryan	Hampson H. Biedler	113,750
Democratic Party	William Jennings Bryan	Charles H. Conley	113,635
Democratic Party	William Jennings Bryan	William H. Hellen	113,573
Republican Party	William Howard Taft	Robert S. Adkins	113,570
Republican Party	William Howard Taft	Joseph Brooks	113,444
Republican Party	William Howard Taft	Luther Kemp	113,364
Republican Party	William Howard Taft	Millard F. Burgess	113,315
Republican Party	William Howard Taft	J. Webb Thomas	113,268
Republican Party	William Howard Taft	Moses Bomberger	113,252
Prohibition Party	Eugene W. Chafin	Joshua Levering	3,302
Prohibition Party	Eugene W. Chafin	Francis B. Sappington	3,111
Prohibition Party	Eugene W. Chafin	James T. Anthony	3,098
Prohibition Party	Eugene W. Chafin	William Kleinle	3,097
Prohibition Party	Eugene W. Chafin	William H. Feldmeyer	3,079
Prohibition Party	Eugene W. Chafin	James R. Whitehurst	3,075
Prohibition Party	Eugene W. Chafin	William Gisriel	3,073
Prohibition Party	Eugene W. Chafin	William S. Norris	3,063
Socialist Party	Eugene V. Debs	Clarence H. Taylor	2,323
Socialist Party	Eugene V. Debs	Benjamin F. Adams	2,192
Socialist Party	Eugene V. Debs	Robert E. Clagget	2,169
Socialist Party	Eugene V. Debs	James Powers	2,166
Socialist Party	Eugene V. Debs	William H. Warfield	2,149
Socialist Party	Eugene V. Debs	William W. Grove	2,145
Socialist Party	Eugene V. Debs	Oswald Weber	2,138
Socialist Party	Eugene V. Debs	Charles W. Smiley	2,128
Independence Party	Thomas L. Hisgen	Charles A. Briscoe	485
Independence Party	Thomas L. Hisgen	William A. Hammond	460
Independence Party	Thomas L. Hisgen	Charles H. Winkleman	440
Independence Party	Thomas L. Hisgen	T. A. Payrleitner	435
Independence Party	Thomas L. Hisgen	Edward H. Trainor	423
Independence Party	Thomas L. Hisgen	Joseph Stir	415
Independence Party	Thomas L. Hisgen	John H. Gordy	403
Votes cast (Note: Based on totals for highest elector on each ticket)			238,531

=== Results by county ===
County	William Howard Taft Republican		William Jennings Bryan Democratic		Eugene Wilder Chafin Prohibition		Eugene Victor Debs Social Democratic		Thomas Louis Higsen Independence		Margin		Total votes cast
County	#	%	#	%	#	%	#	%	#	%	#	%	Total votes cast
Allegany	5,178	48.89%	4,791	45.24%	218	2.06%	385	3.64%	19	0.18%	387	3.65%	10,591
Anne Arundel	2,926	45.47%	3,435	53.38%	52	0.81%	22	0.34%	0	0.00%	-509	-7.91%	6,435
Baltimore	10,197	48.60%	10,297	49.08%	282	1.34%	182	0.87%	24	0.11%	-100	-0.48%	20,982
Baltimore City	51,528	49.82%	49,139	47.51%	1,082	1.05%	1,413	1.37%	261	0.25%	2,389	2.31%	103,423
Calvert	1,070	59.02%	714	39.38%	15	0.83%	3	0.17%	11	0.61%	356	19.64%	1,813
Caroline	1,584	43.29%	1,945	53.16%	97	2.65%	22	0.60%	11	0.30%	-361	-9.87%	3,659
Carroll	3,406	47.19%	3,641	50.45%	148	2.05%	4	0.06%	18	0.25%	-235	-3.26%	7,217
Cecil	2,378	45.04%	2,847	53.92%	49	0.93%	5	0.09%	1	0.02%	-469	-8.88%	5,280
Charles	1,643	57.23%	1,167	40.65%	22	0.77%	11	0.38%	28	0.98%	476	16.58%	2,871
Dorchester	2,627	47.89%	2,769	50.48%	66	1.20%	15	0.27%	8	0.15%	-142	-2.59%	5,485
Frederick	5,966	52.72%	5,158	45.58%	156	1.38%	31	0.27%	5	0.04%	808	7.14%	11,316
Garrett	2,055	61.97%	1,121	33.81%	119	3.59%	21	0.63%	0	0.00%	934	28.17%	3,316
Harford	2,742	45.91%	3,148	52.71%	70	1.17%	6	0.10%	6	0.10%	-406	-6.80%	5,972
Howard	1,276	41.20%	1,764	56.96%	50	1.61%	5	0.16%	2	0.06%	-488	-15.76%	3,097
Kent	1,753	46.98%	1,939	51.97%	19	0.51%	12	0.32%	8	0.21%	-186	-4.99%	3,731
Montgomery	2,805	44.70%	3,351	53.40%	102	1.63%	14	0.22%	3	0.05%	-546	-8.70%	6,275
Prince George's	2,639	48.90%	2,680	49.66%	38	0.70%	10	0.19%	30	0.56%	-41	-0.76%	5,397
Queen Anne's	1,135	34.04%	2,086	62.57%	104	3.12%	7	0.21%	2	0.06%	-951	-28.52%	3,334
Somerset	1,912	52.11%	1,627	44.34%	105	2.86%	12	0.33%	13	0.35%	285	7.77%	3,669
St. Mary's	1,333	54.25%	1,021	41.55%	70	2.85%	20	0.81%	13	0.53%	312	12.70%	2,457
Talbot	1,908	47.30%	2,025	50.20%	86	2.13%	9	0.22%	6	0.15%	-117	-2.90%	4,034
Washington	4,650	49.59%	4,518	48.18%	108	1.15%	97	1.03%	4	0.04%	132	1.41%	9,377
Wicomico	2,273	43.86%	2,751	53.09%	150	2.89%	4	0.08%	4	0.08%	-478	-9.22%	5,182
Worcester	1,529	42.26%	1,974	54.56%	94	2.60%	13	0.36%	8	0.22%	-445	-12.30%	3,618
Totals	116,513	48.85%	115,908	48.59%	3,302	1.38%	2,323	0.97%	485	0.20%	605	0.25%	238,531

==== Counties that flipped from Democratic to Republican ====
- Baltimore (City)
- St. Mary's

Counties that flipped from Republican to Democratic

- Dorchester
- Prince George's
- Talbot

== See also ==
- United States presidential elections in Maryland
- 1908 United States presidential election
- 1908 United States elections
