= National, Maryland =

- Census-designated place
- Location within the State of Maryland National, Maryland (the United States)
- Coordinates: 39°36′40″N 78°56′24″W
- Country: United States
- State: Maryland
- County: Allegany

Area
  - Total: 0.16 sq mi (0.41 km^{2})
  - Land: 0.16 sq mi (0.41 km^{2})
  - Water: 0 sq mi (0.00 km^{2})
- Elevation: 1,765 ft (538 m)

Population (2020)
  - Total: 52
  - Density: 331.1/sq mi (127.84/km^{2})
- Time zone: UTC−5 (Eastern (EST))
  - Summer (DST): UTC−4 (EDT)
- ZIP code: 21532
- Area codes: 240 and 301
- FIPS code: 24-55000
- GNIS feature ID: 2583664

National is an unincorporated community and census-designated place (CDP) in Allegany County, Maryland, United States. As of the 2010 census it had a population of 56.

National is located in the Georges Creek Valley of western Allegany County along Maryland Route 936, 4 miles (6 km) south of Frostburg.

== Demographics ==
Historical population
Census	Pop.	Note	%±
2020	52		—
U.S. Decennial Census
