= Ocean, Maryland =

- Census-designated place
- Location within the State of Maryland Ocean (the United States)
- Coordinates: 39°36′06″N 78°56′42″W
- Country: United States
- State: Maryland
- County: Allegany

Area
  - Total: 0.042 sq mi (0.11 km^{2})
  - Land: 0.042 sq mi (0.11 km^{2})
  - Water: 0 sq mi (0.00 km^{2})
- Elevation: 1,739 ft (530 m)

Population (2020)
  - Total: 33
  - Density: 750.0/sq mi (289.58/km^{2})
- Time zone: UTC−5 (Eastern (EST))
  - Summer (DST): UTC−4 (EDT)
- FIPS code: 24-58215
- GNIS feature ID: 2583667

Ocean is an unincorporated community and census-designated place (CDP) in Allegany County, Maryland, United States. As of the 2010 census it had a population of 32.

Ocean is located in the Georges Creek Valley of western Allegany County, along Maryland Route 936. Frostburg is 4 miles (6 km) to the north, and Lonaconing is 4 miles (6 km) to the southwest.

== Demographics ==
Historical population
Census	Pop.	Note	%±
2020	33		—
U.S. Decennial Census
