= Collier Mountain =

Mountain in Allegany County, Maryland, United States

Highest point
- Elevation: 1,457 ft (444 m)
- Coordinates: 39°37′N 78°41′W

Geography
- Location: Allegany County, Maryland, U.S.
- Parent range: Ridge-and-Valley Appalachians
- Topo map: USGS Patterson Creek

Climbing
- Easiest route: Hike

Collier Mountain is a mountain in the Ridge and Valley region of the Appalachian Mountains, located in Allegany County, Maryland. The 1,457 feet (444 m) ridge is approximately 5 miles (8.0 km) southeast of Cumberland. It runs 6 miles (9.7 km) northeast from the North Branch Potomac River near its confluence with Patterson Creek to Murley Branch south of Breakneck Hill.
