= Detmold, Maryland =

- Census-designated place
- Location within the State of Maryland Detmold (the United States)
- Coordinates: 39°33′27″N 78°59′28″W
- Country: United States
- State: Maryland
- County: Allegany

Area
  - Total: 0.16 sq mi (0.41 km^{2})
  - Land: 0.16 sq mi (0.41 km^{2})
  - Water: 0 sq mi (0.00 km^{2})
- Elevation: 1,496 ft (456 m)

Population (2020)
  - Total: 66
  - Density: 421.9/sq mi (162.88/km^{2})
- Time zone: UTC-5 (Eastern (EST))
  - Summer (DST): UTC-4 (EDT)
- ZIP code: 21539
- Area codes: 240 and 301
- FIPS code: 24-22825
- GNIS feature ID: 2583608

Detmold is an unincorporated community and census-designated place (CDP) in Allegany County, Maryland, United States. As of the 2010 census it had a population of 71.

Detmold is in western Allegany County along Maryland Route 36, which leads north 9 miles (14 km) to Frostburg and 7 miles (11 km) south to Westernport. The town is in the valley of Georges Creek between two high ridges: Big Savage Mountain to the northwest, and Dans Mountain to the southeast. The town is named for Christian Edward Detmold of Lonaconing Iron Furnace fame. It is south of Lonaconing, along Route 36. It had a population of 71 in 2010.

== Demographics ==
Historical population
Census	Pop.	Note	%±
2020	66		—
U.S. Decennial Census
