= Vale Summit, Maryland =

- Census-designated place
- Location within the State of Maryland Vale Summit, Maryland (the United States)
- Coordinates: 39°37′17″N 78°54′37″W
- Country: United States
- State: Maryland
- County: Allegany

Area
  - Total: 0.99 sq mi (2.56 km^{2})
  - Land: 0.99 sq mi (2.56 km^{2})
  - Water: 0 sq mi (0.00 km^{2})
- Elevation: 2,238 ft (682 m)

Population (2020)
  - Total: 111
  - Density: 112.3/sq mi (43.36/km^{2})
- Time zone: UTC−5 (Eastern (EST))
  - Summer (DST): UTC−4 (EDT)
- ZIP code: 21532
- Area codes: 240 and 301
- FIPS code: 24-80075
- GNIS feature ID: 2583699

Vale Summit is an unincorporated community and census-designated place (CDP) in Allegany County, Maryland, United States. As of the 2010 census it had a population of 139.

== History ==
Local lore indicates that the community was so named in the mid 19th century, founded by the local population of coal miners. Previously, however, it was locally known as "Pompey Smash", the origin of which is commonly believed to have come from a slave named Pompey crashing his wagonload of coal. A main road through the village still bears the name "Pompey Smash Road".

A paved road reached the town circa 1921, from Clarysville, along Route 40.

== Demographics ==
Historical population
Census	Pop.	Note	%±
2020	111		—
U.S. Decennial Census
