= Grahamtown, Maryland =

- Census-designated place
- Location within the State of Maryland Grahamtown, Maryland (the United States)
- Coordinates: 39°38′42″N 78°55′20″W
- Country: United States
- State: Maryland
- County: Allegany

Area
  - Total: 0.15 sq mi (0.40 km^{2})
  - Land: 0.15 sq mi (0.40 km^{2})
  - Water: 0 sq mi (0.00 km^{2})
- Elevation: 1,900 ft (580 m)

Population (2020)
  - Total: 368
  - Density: 2,408.7/sq mi (930.01/km^{2})
- Time zone: UTC−5 (Eastern (EST))
  - Summer (DST): UTC−4 (EDT)
- ZIP code: 21532
- Area codes: 240 and 301
- FIPS code: 24-34425
- GNIS feature ID: 2583634

Grahamtown is an unincorporated community and census-designated place (CDP) in Allegany County, Maryland, United States, located at the southeast edge of Frostburg. As of the 2010 census it had a population of 364. It is part of the Cumberland, MD-WV Metropolitan Statistical Area.

== Demographics ==
Historical population
Census	Pop.	Note	%±
2020	368		—
U.S. Decennial Census

== Etymology ==
The town takes its name from Curtis M Graham, who married Susanna Wright, Granddaughter Of Henry Wright a colonial settler of The area. Curtis owned a farmhouse at this site, surrounded by several small service buildings in the 1880s. A fire gutted the farmhouse in 1995, leaving only an uninhabited shell. Grahamtown is also known as Wright's Crossing, marking the point where Maryland Route 36 crosses Welsh Hill. Wright's Crossing gets its name from The Wright Farm, a large holding which was owned by Henry Wright a colonial settler of Allegany County. This farm, the centerpoint Of Wright's Crossing, was originally part of a large colonial estate called Walnut Level.
