= 1892 United States presidential election in Maryland =

- November 8, 1892

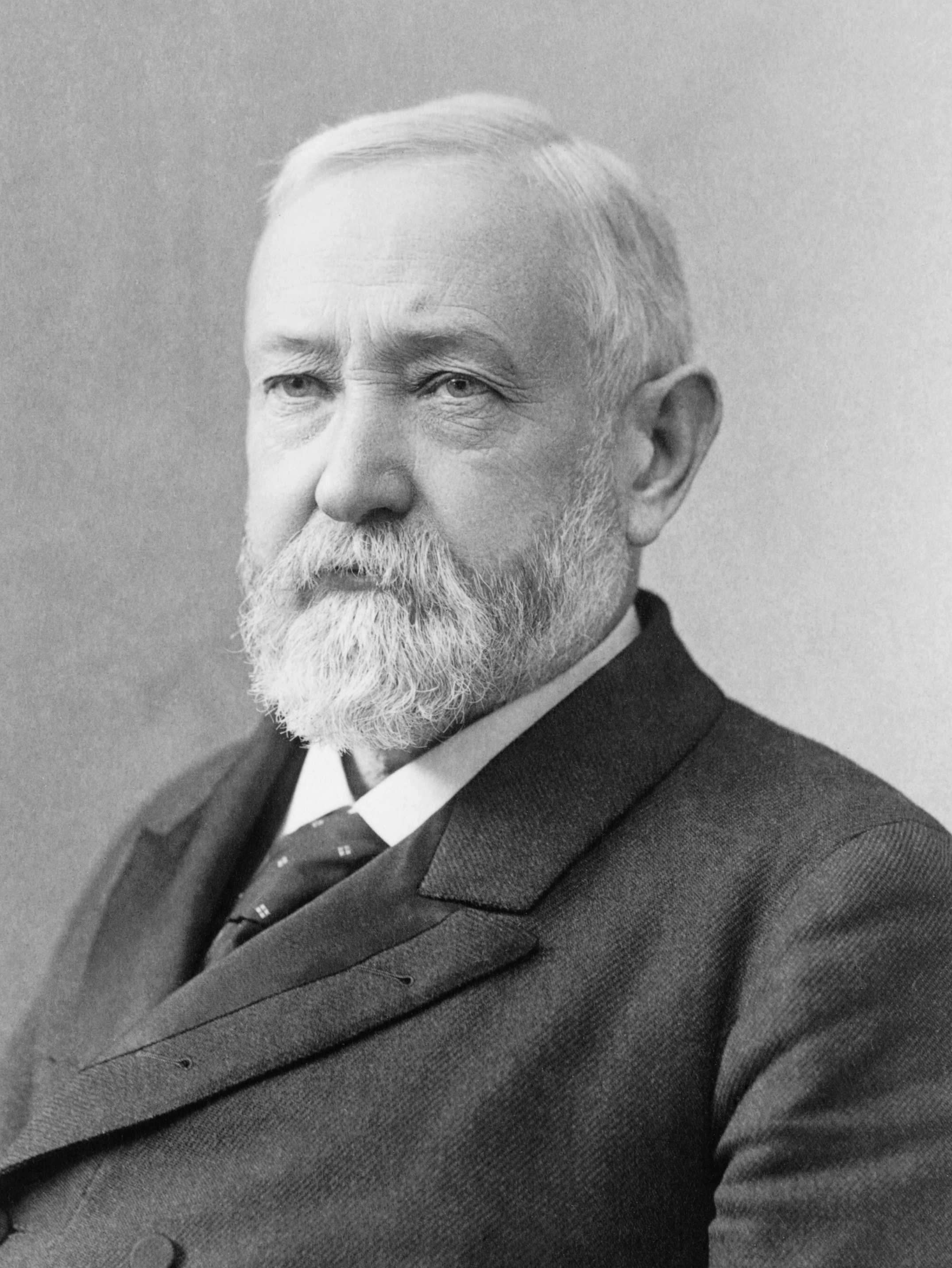
Nominee	Grover Cleveland	Benjamin Harrison
Party	Democratic	Republican
Home state	New York	Indiana
Running mate	Adlai Stevenson I	Whitelaw Reid
Electoral vote	8	0
Popular vote	113,866	92,736
Percentage	53.39%	43.48%
County results
Cleveland
40–50%
50–60%
Harrison
40–50%
50–60%
President before election
Benjamin Harrison
Republican
Elected President
Grover Cleveland
Democratic

The 1892 United States presidential election in Maryland took place on November 8, 1892. All contemporary 44 states were part of the 1892 United States presidential election. State voters chose eight electors to the Electoral College, which selected the president and vice president.

Maryland was won by the Democratic nominees, former President Grover Cleveland of New York and his running mate Adlai Stevenson I of Illinois. Democrats would not win the popular vote in Maryland again until Woodrow Wilson's victory in 1912.

In this election, Maryland voted 6.9% more Democratic than the nation at-large.

== Results ==
1892 United States presidential election in Maryland
Party	Candidate	Votes	Percentage	Electoral votes
Democratic	Grover Cleveland	113,866	53.39%	8
Republican	Benjamin Harrison (incumbent)	92,736	43.48%	0
Prohibition	John Bidwell	5,877	2.76%	0
People's	James B. Weaver	796	0.37%	0
Totals		213,275	100.00%	8
Voter turnout				—

=== Results by county ===
County	Stephen Grover Cleveland Democratic		Benjamin Harrison Republican		John Bidwell Prohibition		James Baird Weaver People's		Margin		Total votes cast
County	#	%	#	%	#	%	#	%	#	%	Total votes cast
Allegany	3,638	43.77%	4,415	53.12%	170	2.05%	89	1.07%	-777	-9.35%	8,312
Anne Arundel	3,398	53.77%	2,800	44.31%	113	1.79%	8	0.13%	598	9.46%	6,319
Baltimore	7,225	56.09%	5,165	40.10%	473	3.67%	17	0.13%	2,060	15.99%	12,880
Baltimore City	51,098	57.12%	36,492	40.79%	1,678	1.88%	189	0.21%	14,606	16.33%	89,457
Calvert	942	43.55%	1,153	53.31%	66	3.05%	2	0.09%	-211	-9.75%	2,163
Caroline	1,453	49.32%	1,344	45.62%	114	3.87%	35	1.19%	109	3.70%	2,946
Carroll	3,721	51.15%	3,328	45.75%	218	3.00%	7	0.10%	393	5.40%	7,274
Cecil	2,898	53.09%	2,310	42.32%	216	3.96%	35	0.64%	588	10.77%	5,459
Charles	1,051	43.96%	1,279	53.49%	14	0.59%	47	1.97%	-228	-9.54%	2,391
Dorchester	2,015	43.83%	2,365	51.45%	166	3.61%	51	1.11%	-350	-7.61%	4,597
Frederick	5,643	49.35%	5,502	48.12%	280	2.45%	9	0.08%	141	1.23%	11,434
Garrett	1,323	44.70%	1,556	52.57%	78	2.64%	3	0.10%	-233	-7.87%	2,960
Harford	3,309	54.95%	2,449	40.67%	254	4.22%	10	0.17%	860	14.28%	6,022
Howard	1,920	56.30%	1,410	41.35%	75	2.20%	5	0.15%	510	14.96%	3,410
Kent	2,009	50.35%	1,886	47.27%	92	2.31%	3	0.08%	123	3.08%	3,990
Montgomery	3,383	54.96%	2,584	41.98%	181	2.94%	7	0.11%	799	12.98%	6,155
Prince George's	2,655	51.85%	2,423	47.31%	23	0.45%	20	0.39%	232	4.53%	5,121
Queen Anne's	2,281	56.70%	1,579	39.25%	162	4.03%	1	0.02%	702	17.45%	4,023
Somerset	1,638	41.04%	1,819	45.58%	487	12.20%	47	1.18%	-181	-4.54%	3,991
St. Mary's	1,482	46.02%	1,693	52.58%	43	1.34%	2	0.06%	-211	-6.55%	3,220
Talbot	1,974	45.96%	2,137	49.76%	177	4.12%	7	0.16%	-163	-3.80%	4,295
Washington	4,667	50.33%	4,373	47.16%	210	2.26%	23	0.25%	294	3.17%	9,273
Wicomico	2,317	57.55%	1,427	35.44%	228	5.66%	54	1.34%	890	22.11%	4,026
Worcester	1,826	50.95%	1,247	34.79%	386	10.77%	125	3.49%	579	16.16%	3,584
Totals	113,866	53.38%	92,736	43.48%	5,904	2.77%	796	0.37%	21,130	9.91%	213,302

==== Counties that flipped from Republican to Democratic ====
- Anne Arundel
- Caroline
- Frederick
- Washington

== See also ==
- United States presidential elections in Maryland
- 1892 United States presidential election
- 1892 United States elections
