= Pleasant Grove, Maryland =

- Census-designated place
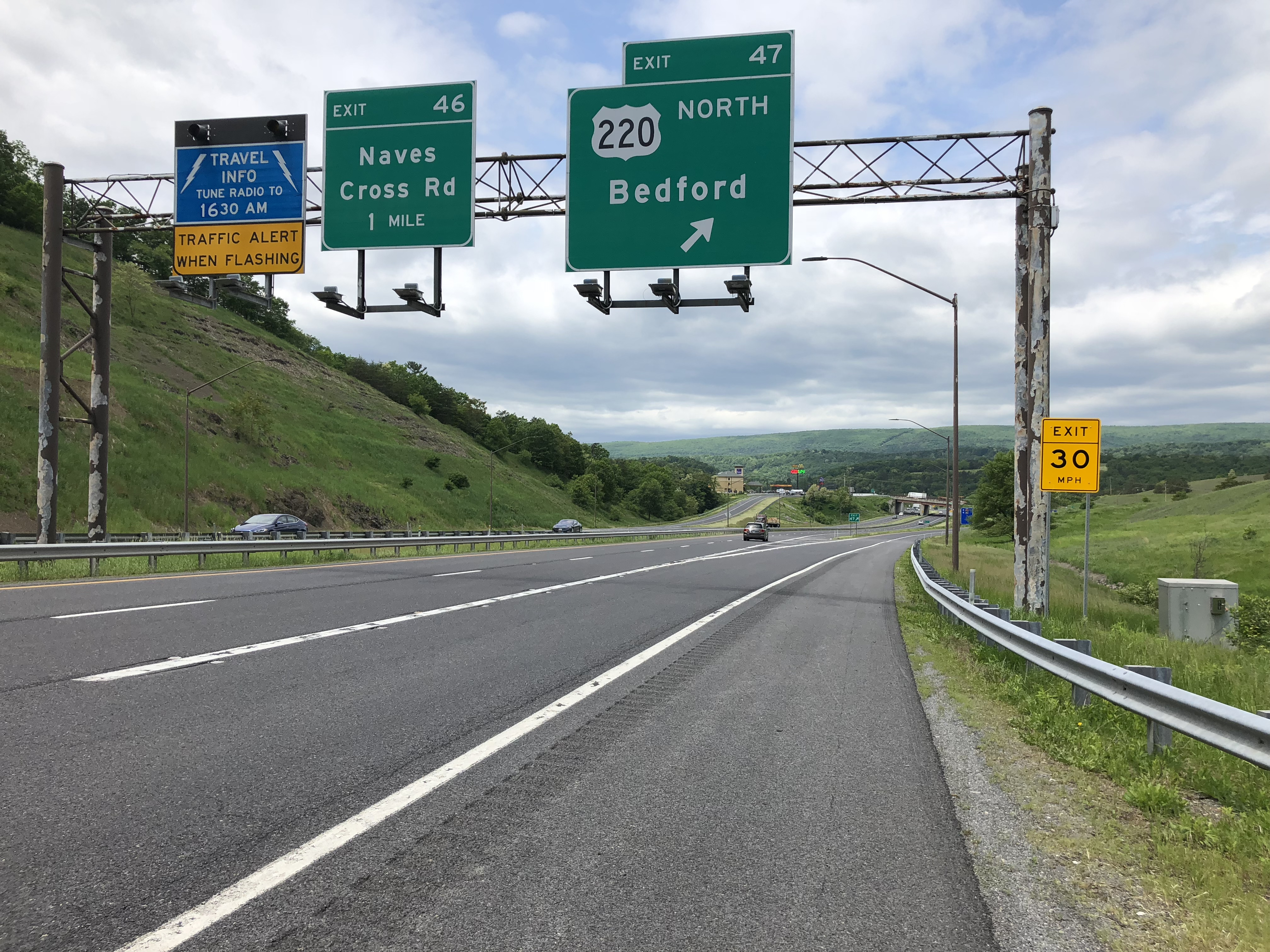
- I-68/US 40 at US 220 in Pleasant Grove

- Location within the State of Maryland Pleasant Grove (the United States)
- Coordinates: 39°40′49″N 78°41′26″W
- Country: United States
- State: Maryland
- County: Allegany

Area
  - Total: 1.59 sq mi (4.13 km^{2})
  - Land: 1.59 sq mi (4.13 km^{2})
  - Water: 0 sq mi (0.00 km^{2})
- Elevation: 965 ft (294 m)

Population (2020)
  - Total: 330
  - Density: 206.8/sq mi (79.84/km^{2})
- Time zone: UTC−5 (Eastern (EST))
  - Summer (DST): UTC−4 (EDT)
- ZIP code: 21502
- Area codes: 240 and 301
- FIPS code: 24-62100
- GNIS feature ID: 2583672

Pleasant Grove is a census-designated place (CDP) in Allegany County, Maryland, United States. As of the 2010 census it had a population of 353.

Pleasant Grove is located east of Cumberland along Maryland Route 144 (Baltimore Pike), the old alignment of U.S. Route 40. Interstate 68, the new highway alignment, also runs through the CDP, with access via Exit 47 at the western end of the community.

== Demographics ==
Historical population
| Census | Pop. | Note | %± |
|---|---|---|---|
| 2020 | 330 | | — |
U.S. Decennial Census
