= Allegany County, Maryland =

County in Maryland, United States

- County
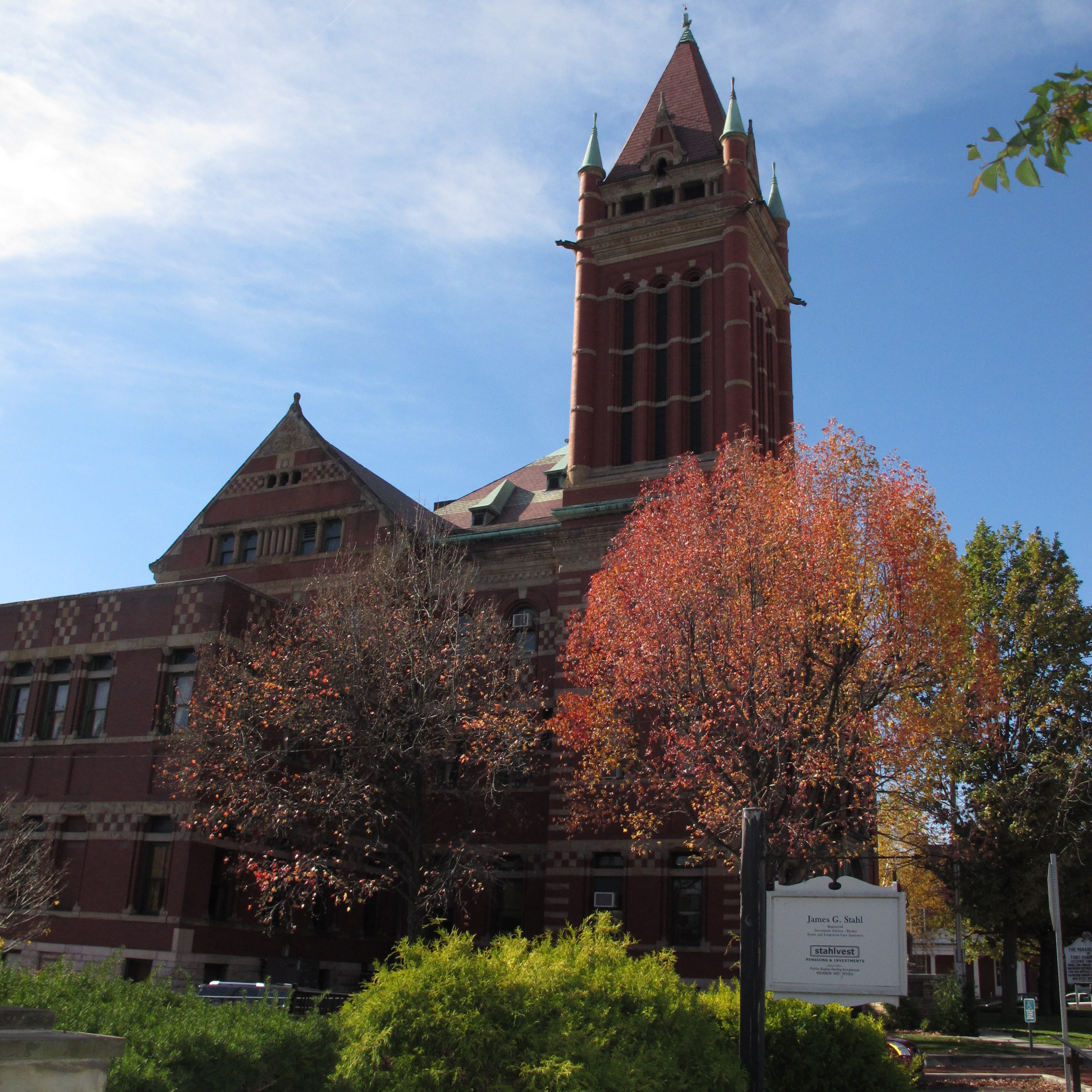
- Allegany County Courthouse

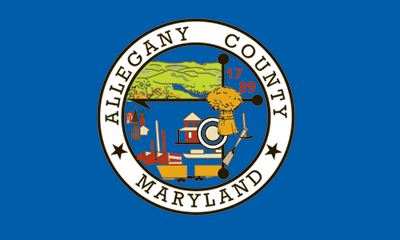
- Flag Seal

- Location within the U.S. state of Maryland
- Coordinates: 39°38′N 78°41′W
- Country: United States
- State: Maryland
- Founded: December 25, 1789
- Named for: Allegheny Mountains
- Seat: Cumberland
- Largest city: Cumberland

Area
  - Total: 430 sq mi (1,100 km^{2})
  - Land: 424 sq mi (1,100 km^{2})
  - Water: 5.8 sq mi (15 km^{2}) 1.3%

Population (2020)
  - Total: 68,106
  - Estimate (2025): 66,848 ▼
  - Density: 161/sq mi (62.0/km^{2})
- Time zone: UTC−5 (Eastern)
  - Summer (DST): UTC−4 (EDT)
- Congressional district: 6th
- Website: www.alleganygov.org

Allegany County is a county located in the northwestern part of the U.S. state of Maryland. As of the 2020 census, the population was 68,106. Its county seat is Cumberland. The name Allegany may come from a local Lenape word, welhik hane or oolikhanna, which means 'best flowing river of the hills' or 'beautiful stream'. A number of counties and a river in the Appalachian region of the U.S. are named Allegany, Allegheny, or Alleghany. Allegany County is part of the Western Maryland region of the state, and is part of the Cumberland metropolitan area.

== History ==
The western part of Maryland (including the present Allegany County) was originally part of Prince George's County when that county was formed in 1696. This county included six current counties, and by repeated splitting, new ones were generated: Frederick from Prince George's in 1748; and Montgomery and Washington from Frederick in 1776.

Allegany County was formed in 1789 by the splitting of Washington County. At the time it was the westernmost county in Maryland, but a split in 1872 created Garrett County, the current westernmost county.

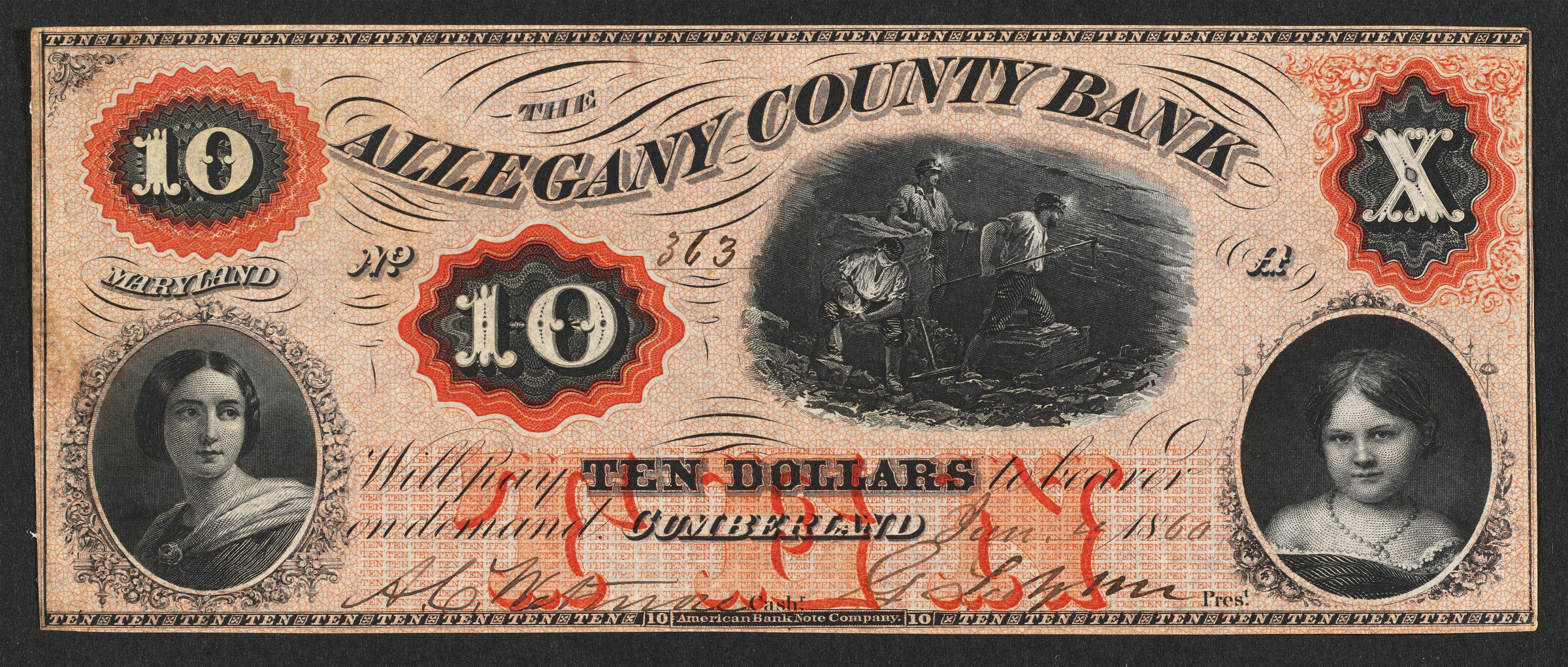
A 10-dollar note from the Allegany County Bank from 1860.

Prior to 1789, the Virginia Commonwealth claimed the area of present-day Garrett and Allegany Counties, of Maryland. A 1771–1780 map of Virginias counties, shows Hampshire County, but the Virginia State boundary has Hampshire outside that boundary line. When conducting genealogical research, it is possible to find tax records for Hampshire County, Virginia included in Maryland records, and Maryland records in Hampshire County... Hampshire County was formed in 1758 by the Virginia Commonwealth and at its founding, included the present day counties of Garrett and Allegany Counties in Maryland, and Hardy, Grant, Mineral, and part of Morgan Counties in what is now West Virginia.

In 1899, Theodore Roosevelt, then Governor of New York, passed through Allegany County on a four ½-hour “whistle stop” tour.

== Geography ==
According to the U.S. Census Bureau, the county has a total area of 430 square miles (1,100 km^{2}), of which 424 square miles (1,100 km^{2}) is land and 5.8 square miles (15 km^{2}) (1.3%) is water.

Allegany County lies primarily in the Ridge-and-Valley Country of the Appalachian Mountains. It is bordered to the north by the Mason–Dixon line with Pennsylvania, to the south by the Potomac River and West Virginia, to the east by Sideling Hill Creek and Washington County, Maryland, and to the west by a land border with Garrett County, Maryland. The western part of the county contains a portion of the steep Allegheny Front, which marks the transition to the higher-elevation Appalachian Plateau and Allegheny Mountain region. The town of Frostburg is located west of the Front at an elevation of nearly 2,100 feet above sea level, while the county seat of Cumberland, only eight miles away, has an elevation of only 627 feet.

=== Mountains ===
- Breakneck Hill (1,872 ft)
- Collier Mountain (1,460 ft)
- Dans Mountain (2,898 ft)
- Evitts Mountain (1,959–2,260 ft.)
- Green Ridge Mountain
- Haystack Mountain (1,240+ ft.)
- Irons Mountain
- Martin Mountain (1,974 ft)
- Nicholas Mountain (1,760 ft)
- Piney Mountain
- Polish Mountain (1,783 ft)
- Ragged Mountain (1,740 ft)
- Town Hill (2,039 ft)
- Warrior Mountain (2,185 ft)
- Wills Mountain (1,960+ ft.)

=== Adjacent counties ===
- Somerset County, Pennsylvania (northwest)
- Bedford County, Pennsylvania (north)
- Fulton County, Pennsylvania (northeast)
- Washington County (east)
- Morgan County, West Virginia (southeast)
- Hampshire County, West Virginia (south)
- Mineral County, West Virginia (southwest)
- Garrett County (west)

=== National protected areas ===
- Chesapeake and Ohio Canal National Historical Park (part)

== Demographics ==
Historical population
Census	Pop.	Note	%±
1790	4,809		—
1800	6,303		31.1%
1810	6,909		9.6%
1820	8,654		25.3%
1830	10,609		22.6%
1840	15,690		47.9%
1850	22,769		45.1%
1860	28,348		24.5%
1870	38,536		35.9%
1880	38,012		−1.4%
1890	41,571		9.4%
1900	53,694		29.2%
1910	62,411		16.2%
1920	69,938		12.1%
1930	79,098		13.1%
1940	86,973		10.0%
1950	89,556		3.0%
1960	84,169		−6.0%
1970	84,044		−0.1%
1980	80,548		−4.2%
1990	74,946		−7.0%
2000	74,930		0.0%
2010	75,087		0.2%
2020	68,106		−9.3%
2025 (est.)	66,848	▼	−1.8%
U.S. Decennial Census; 1790–1960 1900–1990; 1990–2000 2010 2020

=== Racial and ethnic composition ===
Allegany County, Maryland – Racial and ethnic composition Note: the US Census treats Hispanic/Latino as an ethnic category. This table excludes Latinos from the racial categories and assigns them to a separate category. Hispanics/Latinos may be of any race.
Race / Ethnicity (NH = Non-Hispanic)	Pop 1980	Pop 1990	Pop 2000	Pop 2010	Pop 2020	% 1980	% 1990	% 2000	% 2010	% 2020
White alone (NH)	78,629	72,715	69,340	66,195	57,953	97.62%	97.02%	92.54%	88.16%	85.09%
Black or African American alone (NH)	1,296	1,522	3,962	5,959	5,286	1.61%	2.03%	5.29%	7.94%	7.76%
Native American or Alaska Native alone (NH)	31	57	103	90	115	0.04%	0.08%	0.14%	0.12%	0.17%
Asian alone (NH)	175	307	383	566	733	0.22%	0.41%	0.51%	0.75%	1.08%
Native Hawaiian or Pacific Islander alone (NH)	x	x	19	26	22	x	x	0.03%	0.03%	0.03%
Other race alone (NH)	72	26	50	59	185	0.09%	0.03%	0.07%	0.08%	0.27%
Mixed race or Multiracial (NH)	x	x	502	1,107	2,663	x	x	0.67%	1.47%	3.91%
Hispanic or Latino (any race)	345	319	571	1,085	1,149	0.43%	0.43%	0.76%	1.44%	1.69%
Total	80,548	74,946	74,930	75,087	68,106	100.00%	100.00%	100.00%	100.00%	100.00%

=== 2020 census ===
As of the 2020 census, the county had a population of 68,106. The median age was 43.8 years, 17.7% of residents were under the age of 18, and 21.9% of residents were 65 years of age or older. For every 100 females there were 109.1 males, and for every 100 females age 18 and over there were 109.5 males age 18 and over. 65.0% of residents lived in urban areas, while 35.0% lived in rural areas.

The racial makeup of the county was 85.7% White, 7.8% Black or African American, 0.2% American Indian and Alaska Native, 1.1% Asian, 0.0% Native Hawaiian and Pacific Islander, 0.7% from some other race, and 4.4% from two or more races. Hispanic or Latino residents of any race comprised 1.7% of the population.

There were 27,596 households in the county, of which 24.2% had children under the age of 18 living with them and 29.6% had a female householder with no spouse or partner present. About 34.2% of all households were made up of individuals and 16.8% had someone living alone who was 65 years of age or older.

There were 32,911 housing units, of which 16.1% were vacant. Among occupied housing units, 68.9% were owner-occupied and 31.1% were renter-occupied. The homeowner vacancy rate was 2.5% and the rental vacancy rate was 12.0%.

=== 2010 census ===
As of the 2010 United States census, there were 75,087 people, 29,177 households, and 17,959 families residing in the county. The population density was 177.0 inhabitants per square mile (68.3/km^{2}). There were 33,311 housing units at an average density of 78.5 per square mile (30.3/km^{2}). The racial makeup of the county was 89.2% white, 8.0% black or African American, 0.8% Asian, 0.1% American Indian, 0.2% from other races, and 1.6% from two or more races. Those of Hispanic or Latino origin made up 1.4% of the population. In terms of ancestry, 31.8% were German, 14.6% were Irish, 11.9% were English, 11.8% were American, and 5.6% were Italian.

Of the 29,177 households, 26.0% had children under the age of 18 living with them, 46.0% were married couples living together, 11.0% had a female householder with no husband present, 38.4% were non-families, and 31.6% of all households were made up of individuals. The average household size was 2.30 and the average family size was 2.86. The median age was 40.9 years.

The median income for a household in the county was $37,747 and the median income for a family was $52,680. Males had a median income of $42,322 versus $29,594 for females. The per capita income for the county was $20,764. About 9.6% of families and 14.5% of the population were below the poverty line, including 18.3% of those under age 18 and 8.8% of those age 65 or over.

=== 2000 census ===
As of the census of 2000, there were 74,930 people, 29,322 households, and 18,883 families residing in the county. The population density was 176 people per square mile (68 people/km^{2}). There were 32,984 housing units at an average density of 78 per square mile (30/km^{2}). The racial makeup of the county was 93.02% White, 5.35% Black or African American, 0.15% Native American, 0.52% Asian, 0.03% Pacific Islander, 0.19% from other races, and 0.75% from two or more races. 0.76% of the population were Hispanic or Latino of any race. 29.0% were of German, 16.7% US or American, 12.8% Irish, 10.7% English and 5.3% Italian ancestry according to the 2000 census.

There were 29,322 households, out of which 26.50% had children under the age of 18 living with them, 50.60% were married couples living together, 10.30% had a female householder with no husband present, and 35.60% were non-families. 30.10% of all households were made up of individuals, and 15.20% had someone living alone who was 65 years of age or older. The average household size was 2.35 and the average family size was 2.90.

In the county, the population was spread out, with 20.60% under the age of 18, 11.20% from 18 to 24, 26.80% from 25 to 44, 23.50% from 45 to 64, and 17.90% who were 65 years of age or older. The median age was 39 years. For every 100 females there were 99.20 males. For every 100 females age 18 and over, there were 96.90 males.

The median income for a household in the county was $30,821, and the median income for a family was $39,886. Males had a median income of $31,316 versus $21,334 for females. The per capita income for the county was $16,780. About 9.70% of families and 14.80% of the population were below the poverty line, including 17.70% of those under age 18 and 9.50% of those age 65 or over.

As of 2010, Allegany County had a racial and ethnic population composition of 88.16% Non-Hispanic whites, 8.03% Blacks, 0.14% Native Americans, 0.76% Asians, 0.04% Pacific Islanders, 0.08% Non-Hispanics who reported some other race, 1.47% Non-Hispanics who reported two or more races and 1.44% Hispanics.

== Economy ==
According to the county's comprehensive annual financial reports, the top employers by number of employees in the county are the following. ("NR" indicates the employer was not ranked among the top ten employers that year.)

Employer	Employees (2025)	Employees (2016)
UPMC Western Maryland	2,290	2,200
Northrop Grumman	1,600	1,050
Allegany County Board of Education	1,276	1,346
Frostburg State University	939	977
CSX Transportation	900	900
Allegany College	800	800
Western Correctional Institution	588	588
North Branch Correctional Institution	574	574
American Woodmark	570	NR
Allegany County Government	564	NR
Hunter Douglas	NR	860
New Page Corporation	NR	700

== Communities ==
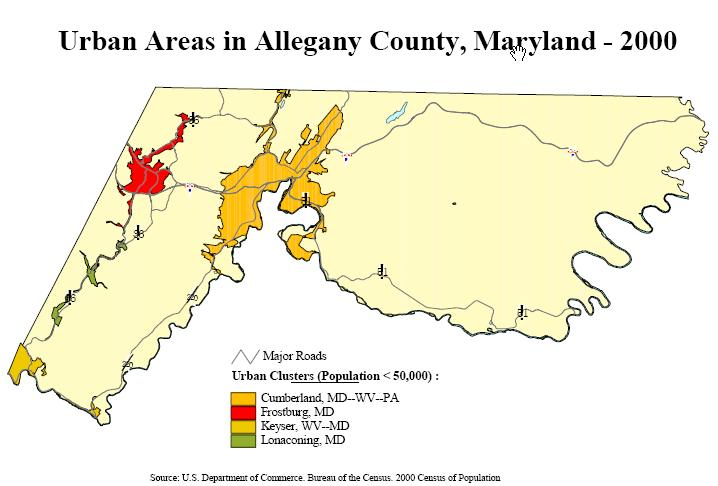

=== Cities ===
- Cumberland (county seat)
- Frostburg

=== Towns ===
- Barton
- Lonaconing
- Luke
- Midland
- Westernport

=== Census-designated places ===
Occupying a middle ground between incorporated and unincorporated areas are Special Tax Districts, quasi-municipal unincorporated areas created by legislation passed by the Maryland General Assembly. They lack home rule authority and must petition the General Assembly for changes affecting the authority of the district. There are eight Special Tax Districts in the county:

- Bel Air
- Bowling Green
- Cresaptown
- Ellerslie
- LaVale
- McCoole
- Mount Savage
- Potomac Park

Other census-designated places in the county include:

- Barrelville
- Bier
- Borden Shaft
- Bowmans Addition
- Carlos
- Clarysville
- Corriganville
- Danville
- Dawson
- Detmold
- Eckhart Mines
- Flintstone
- Franklin
- Gilmore
- Grahamtown
- Klondike
- Little Orleans
- Midlothian
- Moscow
- National
- Nikep
- Ocean
- Oldtown
- Pleasant Grove
- Rawlings
- Shaft
- Spring Gap
- Vale Summit
- Woodland
- Zihlman

=== Unincorporated communities ===
- Amcelle
- Dickens
- Evitts Creek
- George's Creek
- Loartown
- McKenzie
- Narrows Park
- Pinto
- Town Creek

== Government and infrastructure ==
=== Current government ===
The Allegany County Government is governed by a 3-member board of County Commissioners.

Board of County Commissioners
Position	Name	Affiliation	District
President	David J. Caporale	Republican	At-large
Commissioner	Creade V Brode Jr	Republican	At-large
Commissioner	William R. Atkinson	Republican	At-large

Orphans Court
Position	Name	Affiliation	District
Chief Judge	Donna May	Republican	At-large
Judge	Edward Crossland	Republican	At-large
Judge	Albert Feldstein	Republican	At-large

Sheriff
Position	Name	Affiliation	District
Sheriff	Craig Robertson	Republican	At-large

Clerk of the Court
Position	Name	Affiliation	District
Clerk of the Court	Dawne D Lindsey	Republican	At-large

Register of Wills
Position	Name	Affiliation	District
Register of Wills	Mary Beth Pirolozzi	Republican	At-large

States Attorney
Position	Name	Affiliation	District
States Attorney	James Elliott	Republican	At-large

General Assembly
Position	Name	Affiliation	District
Senate	Mike McKay	Republican	District 1
House of Delegates	Jim Hinebaugh	Republican	District 1A
House of Delegates	Jason C. Buckel	Republican	District 1B
House of Delegates	Terry Baker	Republican	District 1C

U.S Congress
Position	Name	Affiliation	District
House of Representatives	April McClain Delaney	Democratic	District 6

=== Libraries ===
The library system was created in 1960, when libraries in Cumberland, Frostburg, LaVale, Pennsylvania Avenue School, and Westernport were merged to form a unified library system. The first of the libraries which would make up the library system was the Washington Street library, founded in 1924. The most recent addition to the library system was the Georges Creek library, which opened in March 2001. The Allegany County Library System currently has six branches: Frostburg Library, Georges Creek Library, LaVale Library, South Cumberland Library, Washington Street Library, and Westernport Library.

=== Infrastructure ===
The North Branch Correctional Institution, (opened 2003), and the earlier adjacent Western Correctional Institution are operated by the Division of Corrections of the Maryland Department of Public Safety and Correctional Services, (with its headquarters in Baltimore) is located in an unincorporated area of Allegany County, just southwest of Cumberland. The prison housed male death row inmates, who were moved from the Maryland Correctional Adjustment Center, from June 2010 until death row was closed in 2014.

== Politics ==
United States presidential election results for Allegany County, Maryland
Year	Republican		Democratic		Third party(ies)	
Year	No.	%	No.	%	No.	%
1856	0	0.00%	2,248	53.70%	1,938	46.30%
1860	522	12.36%	1,203	28.47%	2,500	59.17%
1864	2,455	55.23%	1,990	44.77%	0	0.00%
1868	2,428	47.15%	2,721	52.85%	0	0.00%
1872	3,301	55.05%	2,695	44.95%	0	0.00%
1876	3,217	49.34%	3,303	50.66%	0	0.00%
1880	3,338	49.65%	3,083	45.86%	302	4.49%
1884	3,328	49.92%	2,880	43.20%	458	6.87%
1888	4,072	54.02%	3,299	43.76%	167	2.22%
1892	4,415	53.12%	3,638	43.77%	259	3.12%
1896	5,464	56.45%	3,907	40.36%	309	3.19%
1900	5,944	54.63%	4,527	41.61%	409	3.76%
1904	5,232	56.32%	3,326	35.81%	731	7.87%
1908	5,178	48.89%	4,791	45.24%	622	5.87%
1912	1,396	16.25%	3,382	39.36%	3,815	44.40%
1916	5,760	51.56%	4,859	43.49%	553	4.95%
1920	9,595	57.37%	5,643	33.74%	1,487	8.89%
1924	9,042	55.24%	4,442	27.14%	2,886	17.63%
1928	19,443	67.74%	9,026	31.45%	234	0.82%
1932	12,911	49.05%	12,033	45.71%	1,378	5.24%
1936	11,191	35.87%	19,721	63.20%	291	0.93%
1940	14,804	44.26%	18,456	55.18%	188	0.56%
1944	15,589	50.39%	15,345	49.61%	0	0.00%
1948	14,375	49.00%	14,398	49.08%	562	1.92%
1952	19,186	56.83%	14,529	43.03%	47	0.14%
1956	20,239	65.26%	10,775	34.74%	0	0.00%
1960	20,489	59.93%	13,701	40.07%	0	0.00%
1964	12,384	37.75%	20,425	62.25%	0	0.00%
1968	13,561	42.50%	13,227	41.45%	5,122	16.05%
1972	20,687	64.55%	10,808	33.72%	553	1.73%
1976	15,435	49.15%	15,967	50.85%	0	0.00%
1980	17,512	55.62%	12,167	38.65%	1,805	5.73%
1984	19,763	63.30%	11,143	35.69%	317	1.02%
1988	17,462	59.19%	11,844	40.15%	197	0.67%
1992	13,862	45.31%	11,501	37.59%	5,232	17.10%
1996	12,136	46.68%	11,025	42.40%	2,840	10.92%
2000	14,656	55.58%	10,894	41.31%	821	3.11%
2004	18,980	63.57%	10,576	35.42%	299	1.00%
2008	18,405	61.88%	10,693	35.95%	644	2.17%
2012	19,230	64.42%	9,805	32.85%	815	2.73%
2016	21,270	69.39%	7,875	25.69%	1,509	4.92%
2020	20,886	68.16%	9,158	29.89%	597	1.95%
2024	22,141	68.90%	9,231	28.72%	765	2.38%

Allegany County was granted a home rule form of government in 1974. It is a strongly Republican county, the last Democrat to win a majority being Jimmy Carter in 1976. The only other Democrats to carry the county since 1880 have been Lyndon B. Johnson, Franklin D. Roosevelt (twice), and by very narrow margins Harry S. Truman in 1948 and Woodrow Wilson in 1912.

=== Voter registration ===
Voter registration and party enrollment as of March 2024
Republican	22,648	52.15%
Democratic	10,946	25.21%
Unaffiliated	9,001	20.73%
Libertarian	261	0.6%
Other parties	571	1.31%
Total	43,427	100%

== Transportation ==
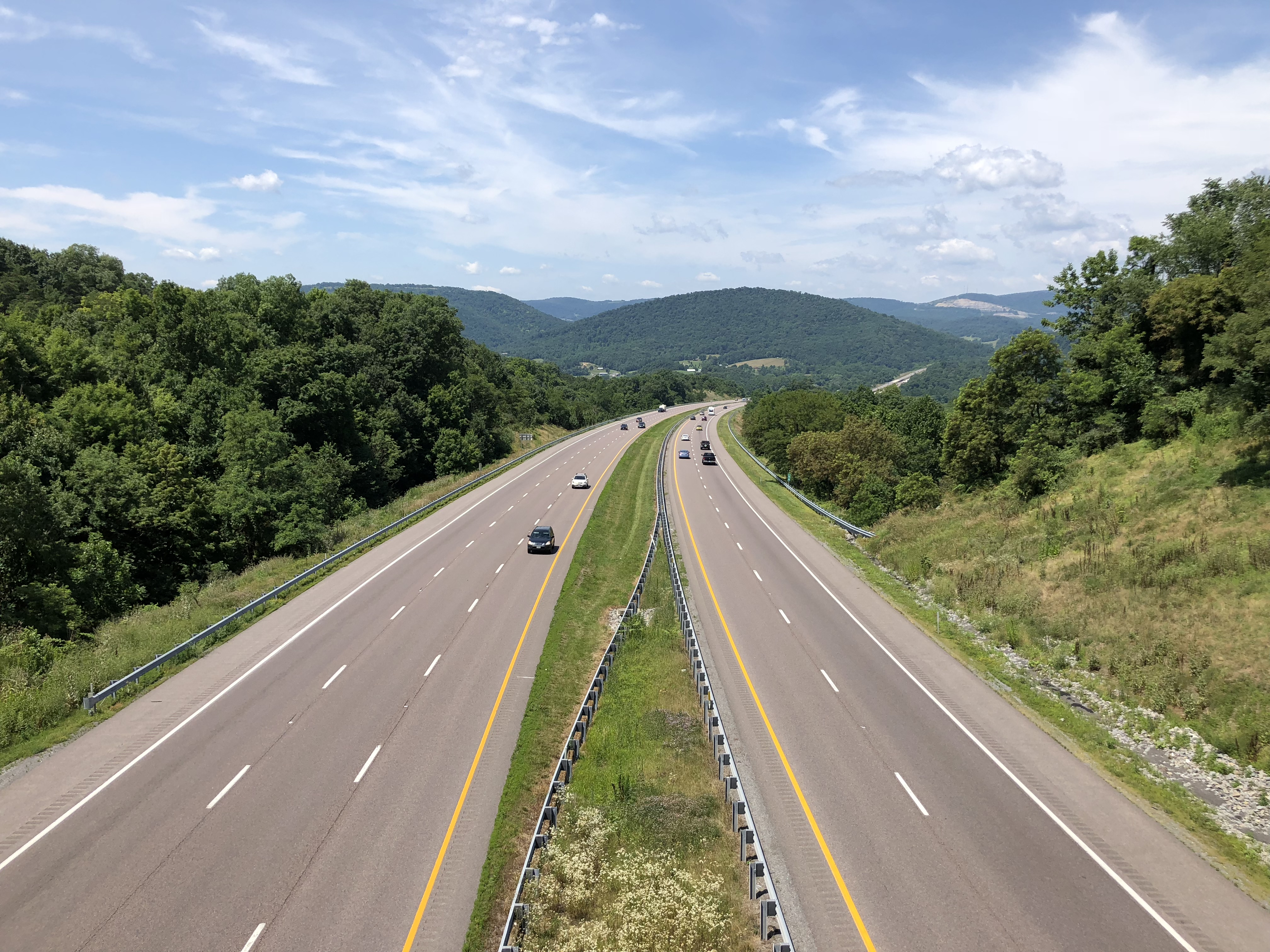
I-68 and US 40 in Allegany County

Allegany County has been, since colonial times, an important node on the nation's transportation network as a key transition point in the movement of goods and people to and from the ports of the Mid-Atlantic and the agricultural and industrial production centers of the Ohio Valley and Midwest. The Cumberland Narrows, a naturally occurring watergap separating Wills and Haystack Mountains, serves as one of the few passages through what is otherwise one of the steepest rushes of the Ridge and Valley province. Because of this, Cumberland has been the site of both planned and completed transportation projects focused on connecting east and west.

On his fateful march from Alexandria to Fort Duquesne in modern-day Pittsburgh during the French and Indian War, British General Edward Braddock and his men, including then-Lieutenant Colonel and Braddock's aide-de-camp George Washington, carved a road, closely following the Native American Nemacolin's Path, from the British encampment at Fort Cumberland, through the Allegheny Mountains all the way to Fort Duquesne. This road, known in early America as Braddock's Road, became the guidelines for the earliest sections of the Cumberland Road, or what later became known as the National Road. Specifically, the section on Braddock's Road from Cumberland to Uniontown, Pennsylvania was followed nearly exactly in the early construction of the National Road. A monument to the start of the National Road now stands on Greene Street in Cumberland, very near the spot Braddock and his men began their expedition.

In modern times, Allegany County is an important regional crossroads. It is crossed from east to west by Interstate 68 and US Route 40, and from north to south by US Route 220, which from Cumberland to the Mason–Dixon line is part of the Appalachian Development Highway System's Corridor O.

=== Major highways ===
- Interstate 68
- U.S. Route 40
- US 40 Alt.
- U.S. Route 40 Scenic
- U.S. Route 220
- Maryland Route 35
- Maryland Route 36
- Maryland Route 47
- Maryland Route 49
- Maryland Route 51
- Maryland Route 53
- Maryland Route 55
- Maryland Route 135
- Maryland Route 144
- Maryland Route 638
- Maryland Route 657
- Maryland Route 658
- Maryland Route 935
- Maryland Route 936
- Maryland Route 956

=== Rail ===
- Amtrak
- Western Maryland Scenic Railroad

=== Public transportation ===
- Allegany County Transit

== Education ==
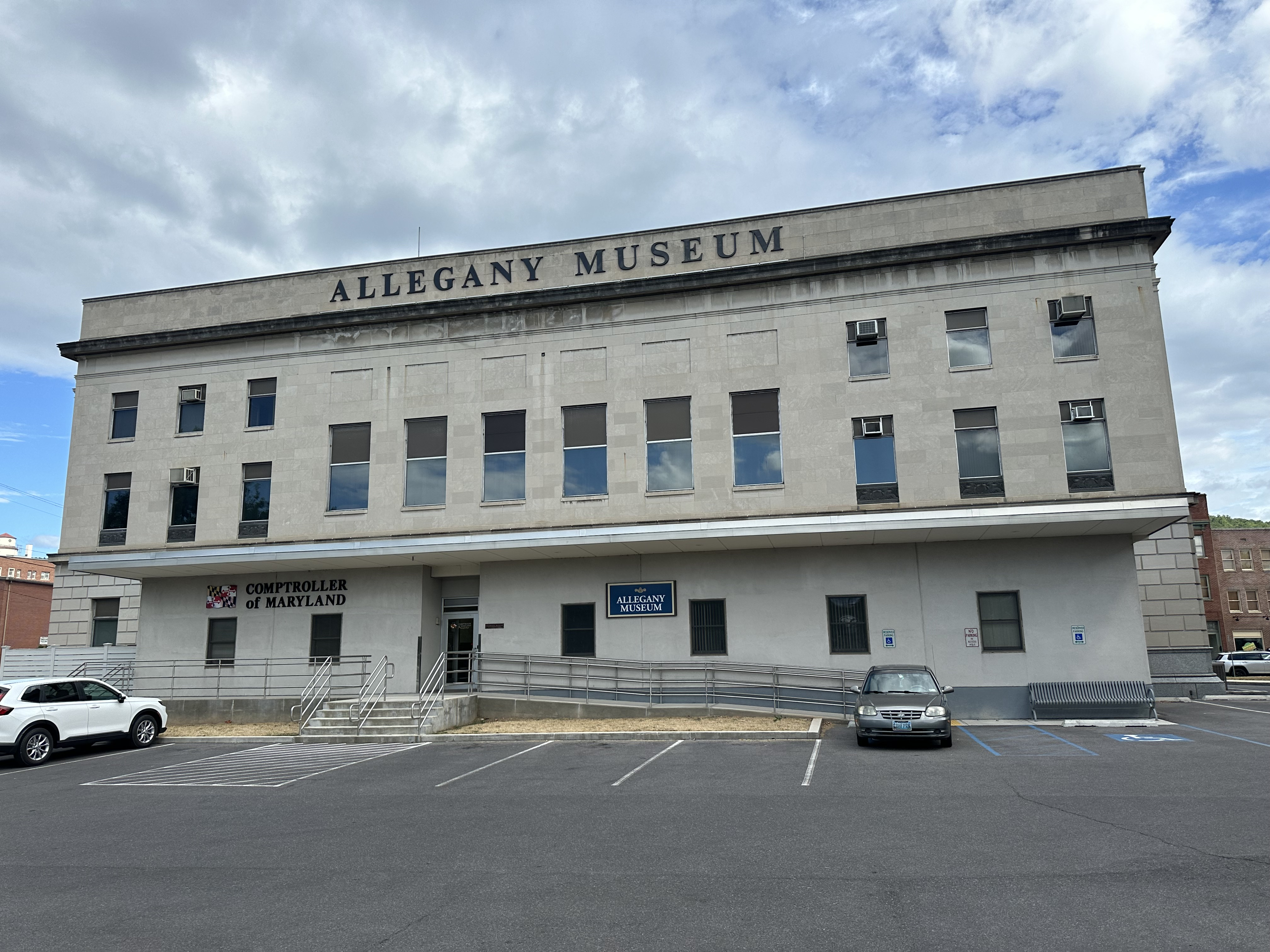
Allegany Museum in Cumberland, Maryland

Public K–12 education in the county is handled by Allegany County Public Schools (ACPS). ACPS is governed by an elected, five-member Board of Education, plus an appointed superintendent. ACPS manages three high schools (grades 9–12), three middle schools (grades 6–8), 13 elementary schools (grades K–5), and one K–8 school, plus the Center for Career and Technical Education in Cresaptown, and the Eckhart Alternative School in Eckhart Mines.

Allegany County is also home to three Christian parochial schools: Bishop Walsh School (Catholic) in Cumberland, Lighthouse Christian Academy (non-denominational) in Cumberland, and Calvary Christian Academy (non-denominational) in Cresaptown.

Allegany County is home to Frostburg State University, one of the eleven member universities of the University System of Maryland, and the only public, four-year university in Maryland west of the Washington–Baltimore combined statistical area. The university, founded in 1898 as the Frostburg State Normal School, FSU, as the university is known to students and alumni, now offers more than 40 undergraduate majors and has a yearly enrollment consistently over 5,000 students.

A junior college experience is available in Allegany County with the Allegany College of Maryland, located in Cumberland. Allegany College provides more than 50 associate degree programs and more than 20 certificate programs, and has more than 3,500 enrollees and more than 16,000 registrants in its Continuing Education programs. ACM also operates a satellite campus in Everett, Pennsylvania, about 30 miles north of Cumberland in Bedford County.

== Natural resources ==
The primary mineral resources extracted for use in Allegany County are coal, iron, sandstone, and limestone. Coal-bearing formations are concentrated in the Georges Creek Basin in the western part of the county.

== Notable residents ==
- Thomas Cresap (c. 1702 – c. 1790), frontiersman and militia leader, who founded Oldtown and widened Nemacolin's Trail, which led west from Cumberland.
- Michael Cresap (1742–1775), born in Allegany County, American Revolutionary War officer.
- Patrick Hamill (1817–1895), born in Allegany County, United States Congressman from Maryland.
- Lloyd Lowndes Jr. (1845–1905), former Governor of Maryland.
- Lefty Grove (1900–1975), born and raised in Lonaconing; Hall of Fame baseball pitcher with the Philadelphia Athletics and Boston Red Sox.
- William H. Macy (born 1950), American actor.
- Sam Perlozzo, former manager of the Baltimore Orioles (2005–2007).
- Leo Mazzone, former pitching coach of the Baltimore Orioles and the Atlanta Braves.
- Casper R. Taylor Jr., former Speaker of the House in the Maryland House of Delegates.
- Eddie Deezen, (born 1957), American actor.
- Ty Johnson (born 1997), running back - Buffalo Bills.
- Drew Hankinson, AKA "Luke Gallows" (born 1983), American professional wrestler
- Bob Robertson (Born 1946) - Played in Major League Baseball as a first baseman between 1967 and 1979, most notably as a member of the Pittsburgh Pirates. Robertson was born in Frostburg, Maryland in 1946 where he graduated from Mount Savage High School in Maryland. Robertson lives in LaVale, Maryland with his wife, Carolyn.

== See also ==
- National Register of Historic Places listings in Allegany County, Maryland

Sandy Creek may not be mentioned here. Here is a reference that it existed (the letter symbols at the end of the reference are defined in a table at the end of Keegan's book) A Third Rutan Family Index p 177 By James J. Keegan Maryland Listings: Peter Rutan - (1776-1848_ p/John Rutan-Catherine Jones of Morris Co. NJ; m (1) Elizabeth McIlrath (1771–1845) (2) Mary Webb (1788–1855) in 1846; he was living in Sandy Creek, Allegany Co. in 1880 and moved to Markleysburg, Fayette Co. PA in 1812; they later (lived) in Caroll Co. OH; GSNJ; LDS; MEACH
