= 1912 United States presidential election in Maryland =

- November 5, 1912

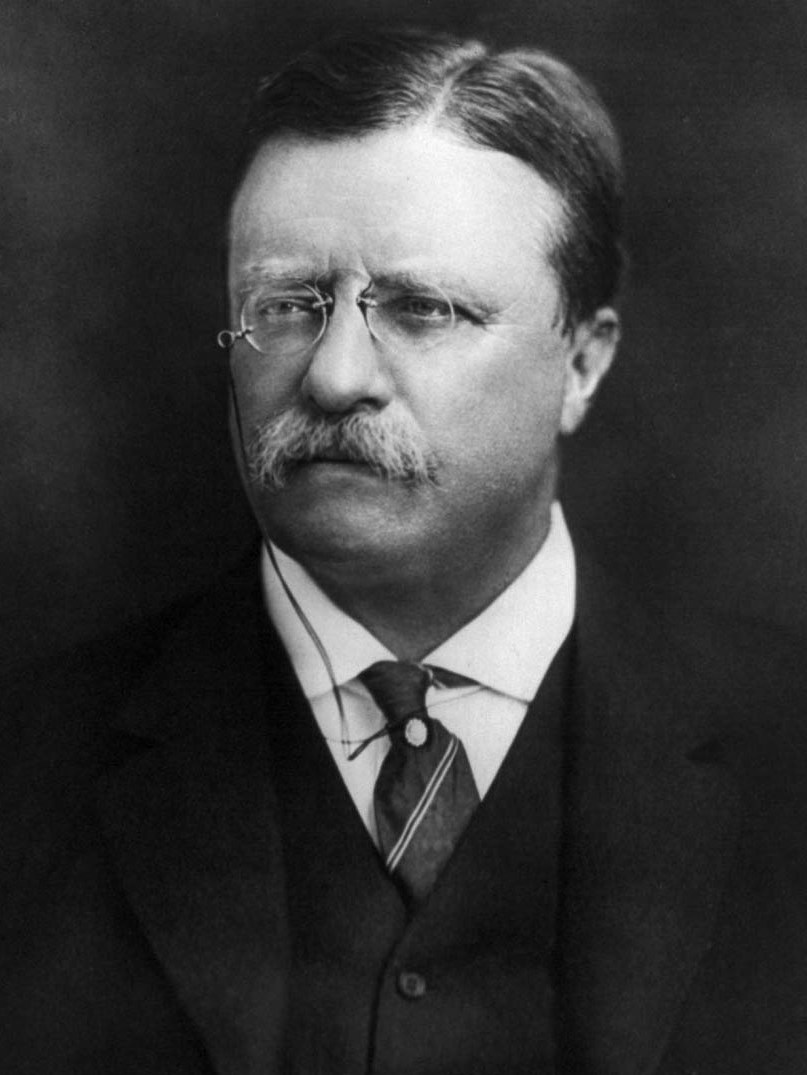

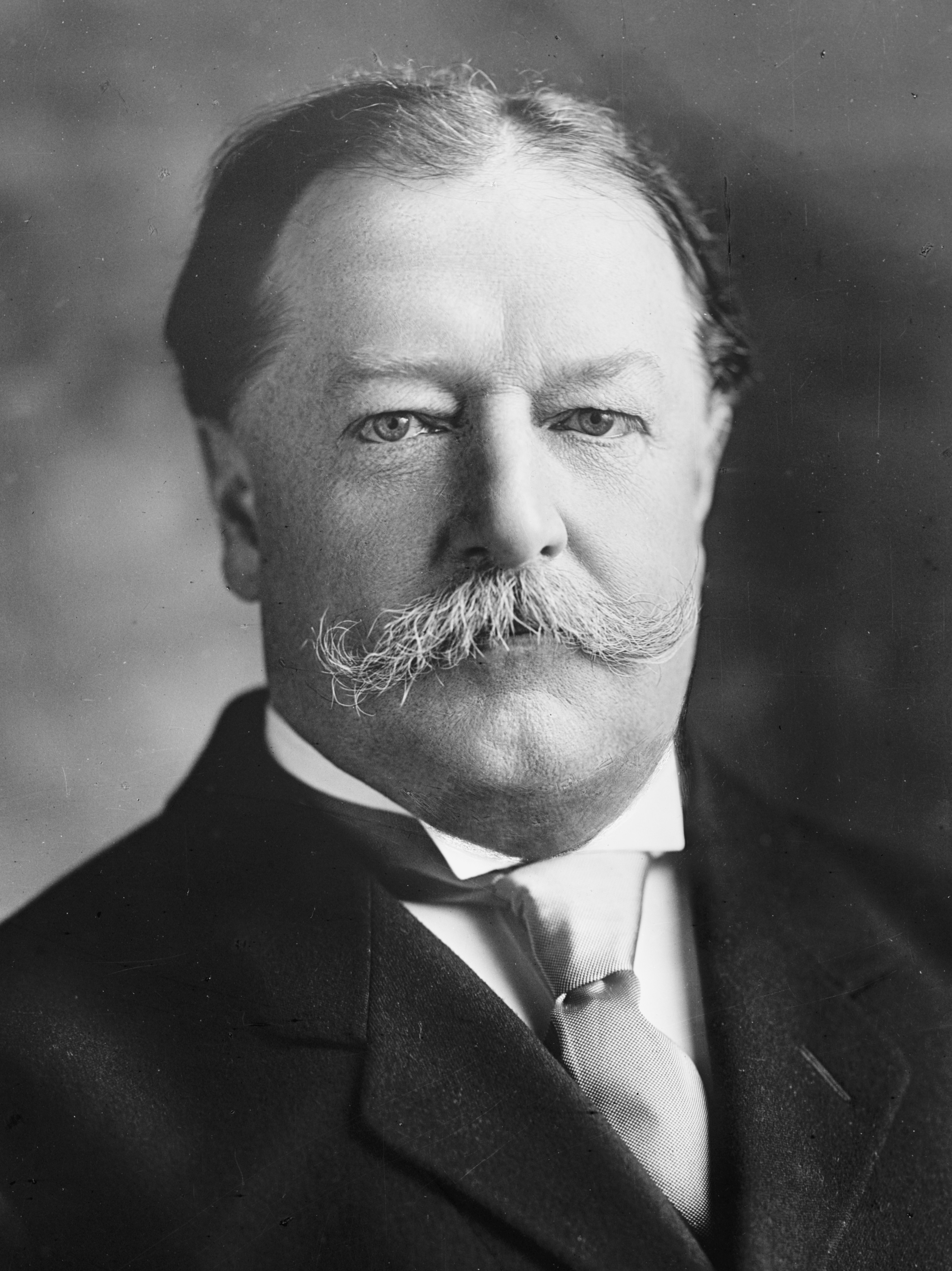
Nominee	Woodrow Wilson	Theodore Roosevelt	William Howard Taft
Party	Democratic	Progressive	Republican
Home state	New Jersey	New York	Ohio
Running mate	Thomas R. Marshall	Hiram Johnson	Nicholas M. Butler
Electoral vote	8	0	0
Popular vote	112,674	57,789	54,956
Percentage	48.57%	24.91%	23.69%
County results
Wilson
30–40%
40–50%
50–60%
Roosevelt
30–40%
Taft
50–60%
President before election
William Howard Taft
Republican
Elected President
Woodrow Wilson
Democratic

The 1912 United States presidential election in Maryland took place on November 5, 1912, as part of the 1912 United States presidential election. State voters chose eight representatives, or electors, to the Electoral College, who voted for president and vice president.

Maryland was won by governor of New Jersey Woodrow Wilson (D–New Jersey), running with governor of Indiana Thomas R. Marshall, with 48.57% of the popular vote, against the 26th president of the United States Theodore Roosevelt (P–New York), running with governor of California Hiram Johnson, with 24.91% of the popular vote and the incumbent 27th president of the United States William Howard Taft (R–Ohio), running with Columbia University President Nicholas Murray Butler, with 23.69% of the popular vote. As of the 2024 presidential election, this is the first and only time that Garrett County did not support the Republican candidate. As of 2024, this is also the last time the Democratic candidate won Carroll County by more than 10%.

This was the first time since 1892 that a Democrat won the popular vote in Maryland.

== Results ==
1912 United States presidential election in Maryland
Party	Candidate	Votes	%
Democratic	Woodrow Wilson	112,674	48.57%
Progressive	Theodore Roosevelt	57,789	24.91%
Republican	William Howard Taft (incumbent)	54,956	23.69%
Socialist	Eugene V. Debs	3,996	1.72%
Prohibition	Eugene W. Chafin	2,244	0.97%
Socialist Labor	Arthur Reimer	322	0.14%
Total votes		231,981	100%

=== Results by county ===
County	Thomas Woodrow Wilson Democratic		William Howard Taft Republican		Theodore Roosevelt Progressive "Bull Moose"		Various candidates Other parties		Margin (Note: Because Roosevelt finished ahead of Taft in Maryland as a whole, all margins give are Wilson minus Roosevelt unless stated in the total for the county in question.)		Total votes cast
County	#	%	#	%	#	%	#	%	#	%	Total votes cast
Allegany	3,382	39.36%	1,396	16.25%	2,631	30.62%	1,184	13.78%	751	8.74%	8,593
Anne Arundel	3,049	46.10%	2,222	33.60%	794	12.00%	549	8.30%	827 (Note: In this county where Taft did run second ahead of Roosevelt, the margin given is that between Wilson and Taft.)	12.50%	6,614
Baltimore	11,524	51.65%	4,247	19.03%	6,211	27.84%	330	1.48%	5,313	23.81%	22,312
Baltimore City	48,030	48.36%	15,597	15.70%	33,679	33.91%	2,016	2.03%	14,351	14.45%	99,322
Calvert	616	34.74%	1,035	58.38%	83	4.68%	39	2.20%	-419	-23.63%	1,773
Caroline	1,882	51.63%	1,445	39.64%	196	5.38%	122	3.35%	437	11.99%	3,645
Carroll	3,616	50.11%	2,546	35.28%	923	12.79%	131	1.82%	1,070	14.83%	7,216
Cecil	2,491	52.60%	1,509	31.86%	646	13.64%	90	1.90%	982	20.73%	4,736
Charles	918	34.69%	1,573	59.45%	113	4.27%	42	1.59%	-655	-24.75%	2,646
Dorchester	2,509	47.08%	2,387	44.79%	313	5.87%	120	2.25%	122	2.29%	5,329
Frederick	5,545	48.81%	2,813	24.76%	2,776	24.44%	226	1.99%	2,732	24.05%	11,360
Garrett	1,005	34.42%	655	22.43%	1,069	36.61%	191	6.54%	-64	-2.19%	2,920
Harford	3,064	53.63%	1,737	30.40%	802	14.04%	110	1.93%	1,327	23.23%	5,713
Howard	1,523	51.45%	1,004	33.92%	364	12.30%	69	2.33%	519	17.53%	2,960
Kent	1,816	53.73%	1,021	30.21%	463	13.70%	80	2.37%	795	23.52%	3,380
Montgomery	3,501	56.10%	1,675	26.84%	884	14.16%	181	2.90%	1,826	29.26%	6,241
Prince George's	2,424	45.38%	1,456	27.26%	1,308	24.49%	153	2.86%	968	18.12%	5,341
Queen Anne's	1,902	55.52%	1,311	38.27%	119	3.47%	94	2.74%	591	17.25%	3,426
St. Mary's	843	36.09%	1,262	54.02%	144	6.16%	87	3.72%	-419	-17.94%	2,336
Somerset	1,617	45.51%	1,528	43.01%	370	10.41%	38	1.07%	89	2.50%	3,553
Talbot	1,888	47.13%	1,835	45.81%	190	4.74%	93	2.32%	53	1.32%	4,006
Washington	4,589	48.10%	1,907	19.99%	2,606	27.32%	438	4.59%	1,983	20.79%	9,540
Wicomico	3,176	55.02%	2,038	35.31%	442	7.66%	116	2.01%	1,138	19.72%	5,772
Worcester	1,764	54.33%	757	23.31%	663	20.42%	63	1.94%	1,007	31.01%	3,247
Totals	112,674	48.57%	54,956	23.69%	57,789	24.91%	6,562	2.83%	54,885	23.66%	231,981

==== Counties that flipped from Republican to Democratic ====
- Allegany
- Baltimore (City)
- Frederick
- St. Mary's
- Washington

==== Counties that flipped from Republican to Progressive ====
- Garrett

== See also ==
- United States presidential elections in Maryland
- 1912 United States presidential election
- 1912 United States elections
