= Martin Mountain Ridge =

Coordinates: 39°44′20″N 78°36′38″W

Martin Mountain Ridge is a ridge located in Allegany County, Maryland lying 3.25 miles west of Flintstone, Maryland and extending into Pennsylvania. Its highest elevation is 1,980 feet.

(N. 39°42' W. 78°38')
