= Nicholas Mountain =

Mountain in Maryland, USA

Highest point
- Elevation: 1,760 ft (540 m)
- Coordinates: 39°37′36″N 78°42′32″W

Geography
- Location: Allegany County, Maryland, U.S.
- Topo map: USGS

Nicholas Mountain, or Irons Mountain, is located in Allegany County, Maryland, United States and extends northeasterly from the North Branch Potomac River for 6 miles (9.7 km) until 3.5 miles (5.6 km) southeast of Cumberland, Maryland. It reaches an elevation of 1,760 feet (540 m).
