= Flintstone, Maryland =

Flintstone
- Census-designated place
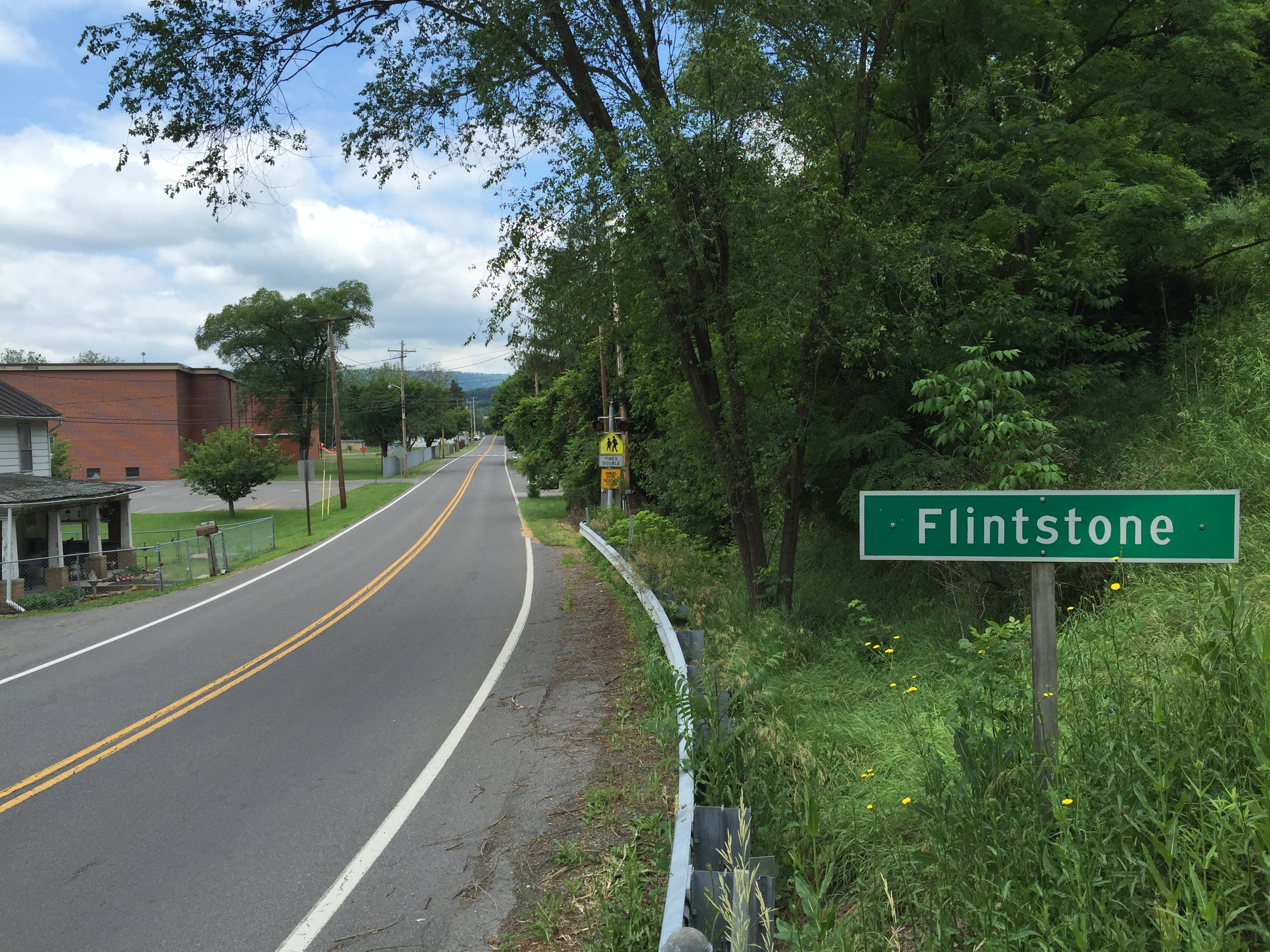
- 2016 view west along Maryland State Route 144 entering Flintstone

- Location within the State of Maryland Flintstone (the United States)
- Coordinates: 39°42′13″N 78°34′33″W
- Country: United States
- State: Maryland
- County: Allegany

Area
  - Total: 0.41 sq mi (1.05 km^{2})
  - Land: 0.41 sq mi (1.05 km^{2})
  - Water: 0 sq mi (0.00 km^{2})
- Elevation: 961 ft (293 m)

Population (2020)
  - Total: 167
  - Density: 410/sq mi (158.3/km^{2})
- Time zone: UTC−5 (Eastern (EST))
  - Summer (DST): UTC−4 (EDT)
- ZIP code: 21530
- FIPS code: 24-28425
- GNIS feature ID: 2583622

Flintstone is an unincorporated community and census-designated place (CDP) in Allegany County, Maryland, United States. As of the 2010 census it had a population of 177. It is part of the Cumberland, MD-WV Metropolitan Statistical Area.

Flintstone lies between the southern foot of Tussey Mountain and a water gap in Warrior Mountain formed by Flintstone Creek, a tributary of Town Creek, which flows south to the Potomac River. Flintstone is located just 1 mile (1.6 km) south of the Mason–Dixon line, the Maryland/Pennsylvania border. Rocky Gap State Park and Green Ridge State Forest are both in the Flintstone zip code. The Breakneck Road Historic District was listed on the National Register of Historic Places in 1980. It is roughly halfway between Washington DC and Pittsburgh.

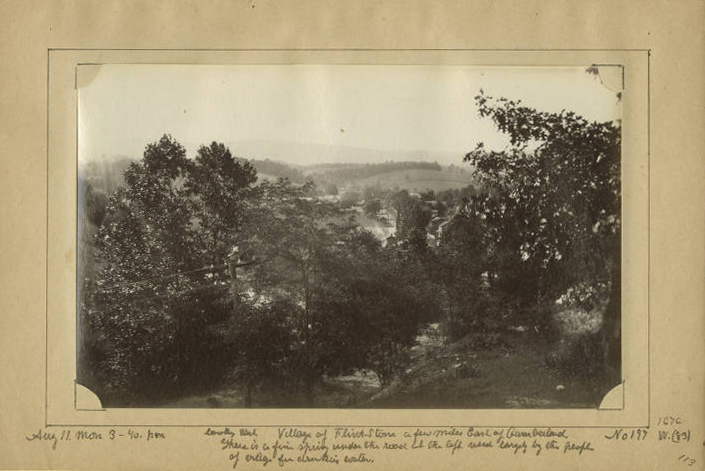
Flintstone in the 1860s

== Demographics ==
Historical population
| Census | Pop. | Note | %± |
|---|---|---|---|
| 2020 | 167 | | — |
U.S. Decennial Census
