= Town Creek (Patuxent River tributary) =

Tributary of the Patuxent River in Maryland

Coordinates: 38.316791°N 76.484675°W

Town Creek is a tributary of the Patuxent River in Saint Mary's County, Maryland.

== Geography ==
The headwaters are located in the community of California, Maryland, on the east side of Maryland Route 235. The creek flows north about 2 miles (3.2 km) to the Patuxent River, which drains to the Chesapeake Bay. The watershed area of the creek is 829 acres (3.35 km^{2}).

== See also ==
- List of Maryland rivers
- Town Creek (Potomac River)
- Town Creek (Tred Avon River)
