= Town Creek, Maryland =

Unincorporated community in Maryland, United States

- Unincorporated community
- Location within the State of Maryland Town Creek, Maryland (the United States)
- Coordinates: 39°31′32″N 78°32′20″W
- Country: United States
- State: Maryland
- County: Allegany
- Time zone: UTC-5 (Eastern (EST))
  - Summer (DST): UTC-4 (EDT)

Town Creek is an unincorporated community in Allegany County, Maryland, United States. Town Creek lies on the Potomac River, within the Chesapeake and Ohio Canal National Historical Park across the river from Okonoko, West Virginia. Town Creek takes its name from a nearby stream.
