= Town Creek (Tred Avon River tributary) =

Tributary in Maryland, USA

Coordinates: 38.693729°N 76.166889°W

Location
- Country: United States
- State: Maryland
- County: Talbot

Physical characteristics
- Source
  - location: Oxford, Maryland
- Mouth: Tred Avon River
  - location: Talbot County, Maryland
- Length: 1.2 mi (1.9 km)
- Basin size: 597 acres (2.42 km²)

Town Creek is a tributary of the Tred Avon River in Talbot County on Maryland's Eastern Shore.

== Geography ==
The headwaters are located in Oxford and the creek flows north 1.2 miles (1.9 km) to the Tred Avon River, which drains to the Choptank River and the Chesapeake Bay. The watershed area of the creek is 597 acres (2.42 km^{2}).

== See also ==
- List of Maryland rivers
- Town Creek (Patuxent River)
- Town Creek (Potomac River)
