= American Woodmark =

American kitchen and bath cabinet manufacturer

American Woodmark Corporation
- Type: Private
- Traded as: Nasdaq: AMWD
- Industry: Furniture
- Founded: 1980; 46 years ago
- Founders: Bill Brandt; Al Graber; Jeff Holcomb; Don Mathias
- Headquarters: Winchester, Virginia, United States
- Area served: US
- Key people: M. Scott Culbreth (Former CEO)
- Products: Cabinets
- Services: Cabinetry installation
- Revenue: ▲US$1.25B(FY 2018)
- Operating income: ▲US$69.9M (FY 2018)
- Net income: ▲US$63.1M (FY 2018)
- Total assets: ▲US$1.65B (FY 2018)
- Total equity: ▲US$581M (FY 2018)
- Owner: Masterbrand, Inc.
- Number of employees: 10,070
- Website: americanwoodmark.com

American Woodmark Corporation is a kitchen and bath cabinet manufacturer headquartered in Winchester, Virginia. The company operates several manufacturing facilities and service centers. The manufacturing facilities are located in Arizona, Georgia, Indiana, Kentucky, Maryland, Tennessee, Virginia, and West Virginia with service centers being located throughout the country.

In August 2025, it was announced that MasterBrand, Inc. would acquire American Woodmark. This merger was completed in May 2026.

== History ==
In 1951, Alvin A. Goldhush created the company Formed Laminates, Inc. in Lindenhurst, Long Island, which made dental cabinets. He left his profession as a dentist and renamed the company Raygold Corp. In 1957, Raygold Corp acquired a wood processing plant in Moorefield, W.V.. Boise Cascade acquired Raygold and moved the company head office from Long Island to Winchester, Virginia.

In the late 1970s, Boise Cascade changed its business focus from wood products to paper products. In 1979, four executives of the cabinetry division (Bill Brandt, Al Graber, Jeff Holcomb, and Don Mathias) initiated a leveraged buyout. They formed American Woodmark Corporation in 1980 and floated on Nasdaq in 1986 for $15 per share.

Today the company operates 18 manufacturing plants throughout the US and Mexico and nine service centers who provide direct service to the new home construction market.

== Products ==
American Woodmark produces and distributes faceframe kitchen and bath cabinetry through a variety of channels, including remodel, new construction and specialty dealers. Cabinets are vertically integrated, source the majority of their hardwood raw materials from the Appalachian region, and assembled in the US in one of four assembly plants throughout the country.
