= Warrior Mountain =

Mountain ridge in Maryland, United States

- Location within Maryland

Highest point
- Elevation: 2,185 ft (666 m) NAVD 88
- Prominence: 955 ft (291 m)
- Coordinates: 39°37′16″N 78°37′13″W

Geography
- Location: Allegany County, Maryland
- Parent range: Ridge-and-Valley Appalachians
- Topo map: USGS Oldtown

Warrior Mountain is a ridge located in Allegany County, Maryland. Warrior Mountain begins 3 miles (4.8 km) northwest of Oldtown, Maryland and runs northeasterly to the water gap formed by the Murley Branch of Town Creek, 1.25 miles (2.01 km) south of Flintstone, Maryland. North of this gap, the Warrior Ridge runs parallel and to the east of Tussey Mountain north past Everett, Pennsylvania until its ridge line merges with the Tussey Mountain ridge line at the Blair County/Bedford County boundary.
