= Breakneck Hill =

Highest point
- Elevation: 1,872 ft (571 m)
- Coordinates: 39°40′36″N 78°38′19″W

Geography
- Location: Allegany County, Maryland, U.S.
- Parent range: Ridge-and-Valley Appalachians
- Topo map: USGS Evitts Creek

Climbing
- Easiest route: Hike

Breakneck Hill is a mountain in the Ridge and Valley region of the Appalachian Mountains, located in Allegany County, Maryland. The 1,872 feet (571 m) ridge is just south of Interstate 68 across from Rocky Gap State Park, approximately 2 miles (3.2 km) northwest of the town of Rush.
