= Town Creek (Potomac River tributary) =

Stream in the U.S. states of Pennsylvania and Maryland

Coordinates: 39.5259260°N 78.5430685°W

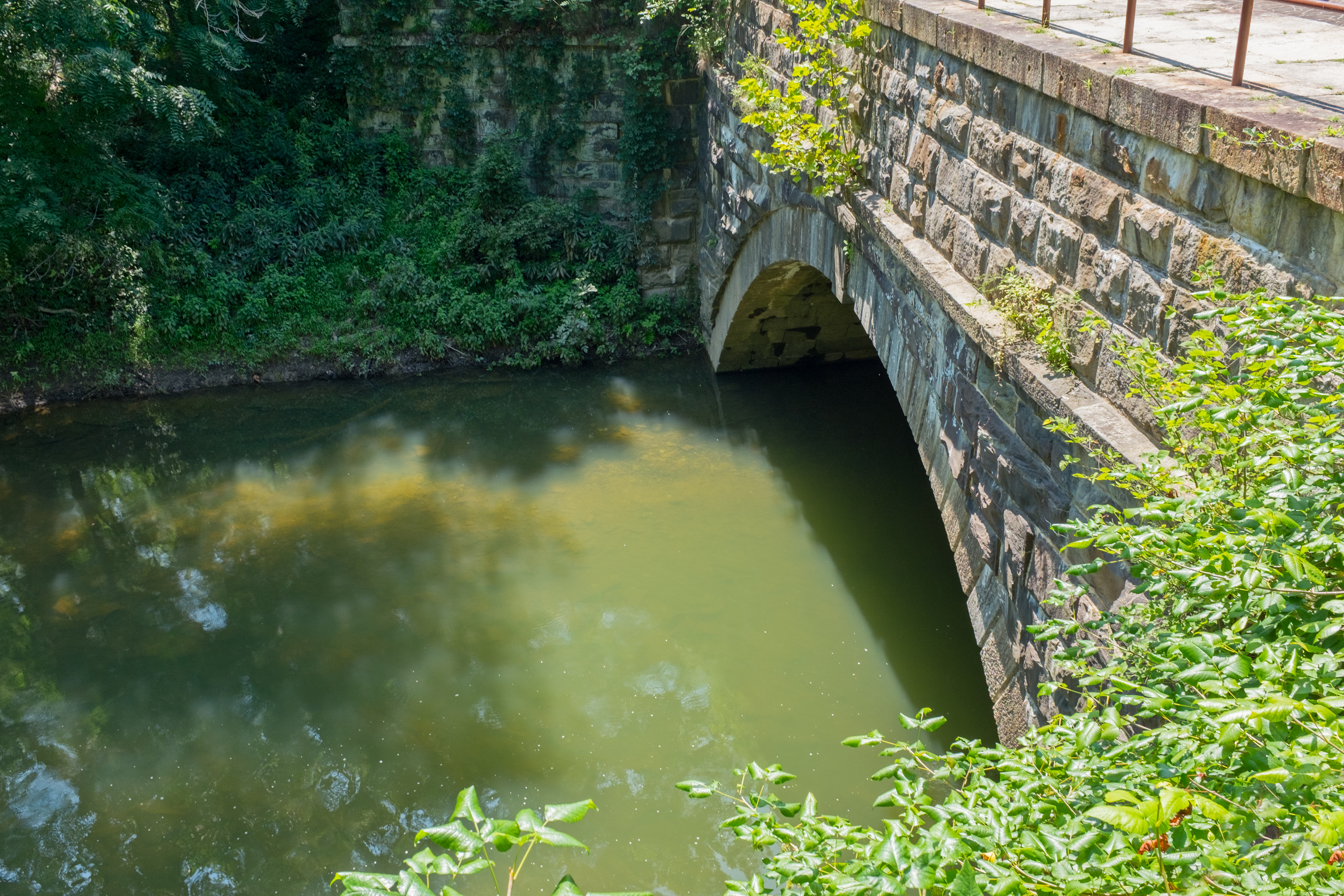
Town Creek and the Town Creek Aqueduct

Town Creek is a 41.6-mile-long (66.9 km) tributary stream of the Potomac River in the U.S. states of Maryland and Pennsylvania. The creek is formed from the confluence of Sweet Root Creek and Elk Lick Creek, about 0.5 miles (0.8 km) south of Buchanan State Forest in Bedford County, Pennsylvania. Town Creek flows south along the base of Warrior Mountain into Allegany County, Maryland. The Chesapeake and Ohio Canal crosses it at the Town Creek Aqueduct. It empties into the Potomac about 4 miles (6 km) east of Oldtown, Maryland.

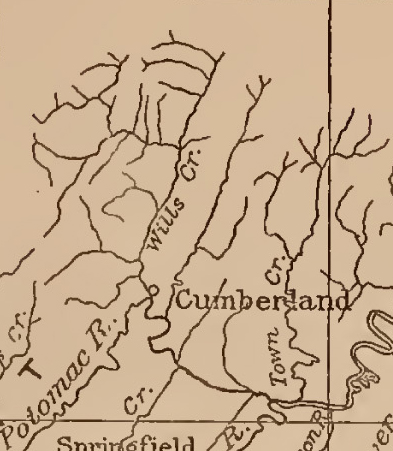
Wills Creek and Town Creek Watersheds in Pennsylvania and Maryland

== See also ==
- List of rivers of Maryland
- List of rivers of Pennsylvania
- Town Creek (Patuxent River)
- Town Creek (Tred Avon River)
