= Pennsylvania's 14th congressional district =

U.S. House district for Pennsylvania

Coordinates: 40°25′57″N 79°54′21″W

- Interactive map of district boundaries since January 3, 2023
- Representative: Guy Reschenthaler; R–Peters Township, Washington County
- Distribution: 99.78% urban; 0.22% rural
- Population (2025): 749,673
- Median household income: $68,215
- Ethnicity: 90.4% White; 3.7% Two or more races; 3.3% Black; 1.6% Hispanic; 0.6% Asian; 0.4% other
- Cook PVI: R+17

Pennsylvania's 14th congressional district is located in the southwestern part of the state and includes all of Fayette County, Greene County, and Washington County, and most of Indiana, Westmoreland, and Somerset counties. It is represented by Republican Guy Reschenthaler.

Before 2018, the 14th district included the entire city of Pittsburgh and parts of surrounding suburbs. The Supreme Court of Pennsylvania redrew the district in February 2018 after ruling the previous map unconstitutional. The 14th and 18th districts swapped names and had their boundaries adjusted for the 2018 elections and representation thereafter.

== Recent election results from statewide races ==
Year	Office	Results
2008	President	McCain 53% - 45%
2008	Attorney General	Corbett 61% - 39%
2008	Auditor General	Wagner 65% - 35%
2010	Senate	Toomey 57% - 43%
2010	Governor	Corbett 63% - 37%
2012	President	Romney 59% - 41%
2012	Senate	Smith 55% - 45%
2014	Governor	Corbett 52% - 48%
2016	President	Trump 64% - 32%
2016	Senate	Toomey 59% - 35%
2016	Attorney General	Rafferty Jr. 58% - 42%
2016	Auditor General	Brown 51% - 44%
2016	Treasurer	Voit III 51% - 43%
2018	Senate	Barletta 54% - 45%
2018	Governor	Wagner 52% - 46%
2020	President	Trump 65% - 34%
2020	Attorney General	Heidelbaugh 58% - 39%
2020	Auditor General	DeFoor 63% - 33%
2020	Treasurer	Garrity 62% - 35%
2022	Senate	Oz 60% - 38%
2022	Governor	Mastriano 55% - 44%
2024	President	Trump 66% - 33%
2024	Senate	McCormick 63% - 34%
2024	Attorney General	Sunday 64% - 33%
2024	Auditor General	DeFoor 65% - 32%
2024	Treasurer	Garrity 66% - 32%

== Counties and municipalities ==
Fayette County (43)

All 43 municipalities

Greene County (26)

All 26 municipalities

Indiana County (28)

Armagh, Armstrong Township, Black Lick Township, Blairsville, Brush Valley Township, Buffington Township, Burrell Township, Center Township, Cherryhill Township, Cherry Tree, Clymer, Conemaugh Township, Creekside, East Wheatfield Township, Ernest, Green Township, Homer City, Indiana, Pine Township, Plumville, Rayne Township, Saltsburg, Shelocta, South Mahoning Township (part; also 15th) Washington Township, West Wheatfield Township, White Township, Young Township

Somerset County (51)

Addison Borough, Addison Township, Allegheny Township, Benson, Berlin, Black Township, Boswell, Brothersvalley Township, Callimont, Casselman, Central City, Conemaugh Township (part; also 13th; includes Davidsville and Jerome), Confluence, Elk Lick Township, Fairhope Township, Garrett, Greenville Township, Hooversville, Indian Lake, Jefferson Township, Jennerstown, Meyersdale, Larimer Township, Lincoln Township, Lower Turkeyfoot Townshp, Middlecreek Township, Milford Township, New Baltimore, New Centerville, Northampton Township, Ogle Township, Paint Borough, Paint Township, Quemahoning Township, Rockwood, Salisbury, Seven Springs (shared with Fayette County), Shade Township, Shanksville, Somerset Borough, Somerset Township, Southampton Township, Stonycreek Township, Stoystown, Summit Township, Upper Turkeyfoot Township, Ursina, Wellersburg, Windber

Washington County (66)

All 66 municipalities

Westmoreland County (49)

Allegheny Township, Arnold, Avonmore, Bell Township, Bolivar, Cook Township, Delmont, Derry Borough, Derry Township, Donegal Borough, Donegal Township, East Huntingdon Township, East Vandergrift, Fairfield Township, Greensburg, Hempfield Township (part; also 12th; includes Grapeville), Hunker, Hyde Park, Latrobe, Laurel Mountain, Ligonier Borough, Ligonier Township, Lower Burrell, Loyalhanna Township, Monessen, Mount Pleasant Borough, Mount Pleasant Township, New Alexandria, New Florence, New Kensington, North Belle Vernon, Oklahoma, Rostraver Township, St. Clair Township, Salem Township, Scottdale, Seward, Smithton, South Greensburg, Southwest Greensburg, South Huntingdon Township (part; also 12th; includes Wyano and Yukon), Unity Township, Upper Burrell Township, Vandergrift, Washington Township, West Leechburg, West Newton, Youngstown, Youngwood

== List of members representing the district ==
Member	Party	Years	Cong ress	Electoral history	Location
District established March 4, 1813
Adamson Tannehill (Pittsburgh)	Democratic-Republican	March 4, 1813 – March 3, 1815	13th	Elected in 1812. Lost re-election.	1813–1823; Allegheny and Butler Counties
John Woods (Pittsburgh)	Federalist	March 4, 1815 – December 16, 1816	14th	Elected in 1814. Did not attend Congress or qualify and then died.	1813–1823; Allegheny and Butler Counties
Vacant		December 16, 1816 – March 3, 1817	14th		1813–1823; Allegheny and Butler Counties
Henry Baldwin (Pittsburgh)	Democratic-Republican	March 4, 1817 – May 8, 1822	15th 16th 17th	Elected in 1816. Re-elected in 1818. Re-elected in 1820. Resigned.	1813–1823; Allegheny and Butler Counties
Vacant		May 8, 1822 – October 8, 1822	17th		1813–1823; Allegheny and Butler Counties
Walter Forward (Pittsburgh)	Democratic-Republican	October 8, 1822 – March 3, 1823	17th	Elected to finish Baldwin's term. Redistricted to the 16th district.	1813–1823; Allegheny and Butler Counties
Andrew Stewart (Uniontown)	Democratic-Republican	March 4, 1823 – March 3, 1825	18th 19th 20th	Redistricted from the 13th district and re-elected in 1822. Re-elected in 1824. Re-elected in 1826. Lost re-election.	1823–1833; Fayette and Greene Counties
Andrew Stewart (Uniontown)	Jacksonian	March 4, 1825 – March 3, 1827	18th 19th 20th	Redistricted from the 13th district and re-elected in 1822. Re-elected in 1824. Re-elected in 1826. Lost re-election.	1823–1833; Fayette and Greene Counties
Andrew Stewart (Uniontown)	Anti-Jacksonian	March 4, 1827 – March 3, 1829	18th 19th 20th	Redistricted from the 13th district and re-elected in 1822. Re-elected in 1824. Re-elected in 1826. Lost re-election.	1823–1833; Fayette and Greene Counties
Thomas Irwin (Uniontown)	Jacksonian	March 4, 1829 – March 3, 1831	21st	Elected in 1828. Retired.	1823–1833; Fayette and Greene Counties
Andrew Stewart (Uniontown)	Anti-Masonic	March 4, 1831 – March 3, 1833	22nd	Elected in 1830. Redistricted to the 20th district.	1823–1833; Fayette and Greene Counties
Joseph Henderson (Browns Mills)	Jacksonian	March 4, 1833 – March 3, 1837	23rd 24th	Elected in 1832. Re-elected in 1834. Retired.	1833–1843; Centre, Huntingdon, and Mifflin Counties
William W. Potter (Philadelphia)	Democratic	March 4, 1837 – October 28, 1839	25th 26th	Elected in 1836. Re-elected in 1838. Died.	1833–1843; Centre, Huntingdon, and Mifflin Counties
Vacant		October 28, 1839 – November 20, 1839	26th		1833–1843; Centre, Huntingdon, and Mifflin Counties
George McCulloch (Center Line)	Democratic	November 20, 1839 – March 3, 1841	26th	Elected to finish Potter's term. [data missing]	1833–1843; Centre, Huntingdon, and Mifflin Counties
James Irvin (Milesburg)	Whig	March 4, 1841 – March 3, 1843	27th	Elected in 1840. Redistricted to the 17th district.	1833–1843; Centre, Huntingdon, and Mifflin Counties
Alexander Ramsey (Harrisburg)	Whig	March 4, 1843 – March 3, 1847	28th 29th	Elected in 1843. Re-elected in 1844. [data missing]	1843–1853; Dauphin, Lebanon, and Schuylkill Counties
George N. Eckert (Pottsville)	Whig	March 4, 1847 – March 3, 1849	30th	Elected in 1846. [data missing]	1843–1853; Dauphin, Lebanon, and Schuylkill Counties
Charles W. Pitman (Pottsville)	Whig	March 4, 1849 – March 3, 1851	31st	Elected in 1848. [data missing]	1843–1853; Dauphin, Lebanon, and Schuylkill Counties
Thomas M. Bibighaus (Lebanon)	Whig	March 4, 1851 – March 3, 1853	32nd	Elected in 1850. Retired due to ill health.	1843–1853; Dauphin, Lebanon, and Schuylkill Counties
Galusha A. Grow (Glenwood)	Democratic	March 4, 1853 – March 3, 1857	33rd 34th 35th 36th 37th	Redistricted from the 12th district and re-elected in 1852. Re-elected in 1854. Re-elected in 1856. Re-elected in 1858. Re-elected in 1860. Lost re-election.	1853–1863; Bradford, Susquehanna, and Tioga Counties
Galusha A. Grow (Glenwood)	Republican	March 4, 1857 – March 3, 1863	33rd 34th 35th 36th 37th	Redistricted from the 12th district and re-elected in 1852. Re-elected in 1854. Re-elected in 1856. Re-elected in 1858. Re-elected in 1860. Lost re-election.	1853–1863; Bradford, Susquehanna, and Tioga Counties
William H. Miller (Harrisburg)	Democratic	March 4, 1863 – March 3, 1865	38th	Elected in 1862. Lost re-election.	1863–1873; Dauphin, Juniata, Northumberland, Snyder, and Union counties
George F. Miller (Lewisburg)	Republican	March 4, 1865 – March 3, 1869	39th 40th	Elected in 1864. Re-elected in 1866. [data missing]	1863–1873; Dauphin, Juniata, Northumberland, Snyder, and Union counties
John B. Packer (Sunbury)	Republican	March 4, 1869 – March 3, 1877	41st 42nd 43rd 44th	Elected in 1868. Re-elected in 1870. Re-elected in 1872. Re-elected in 1874. Retired.	1863–1873; Dauphin, Juniata, Northumberland, Snyder, and Union counties
John B. Packer (Sunbury)	Republican	March 4, 1869 – March 3, 1877	41st 42nd 43rd 44th	Elected in 1868. Re-elected in 1870. Re-elected in 1872. Re-elected in 1874. Retired.	1873–1893; Dauphin, Lebanon, and Northumberland counties
John W. Killinger (Lebanon)	Republican	March 4, 1877 – March 3, 1881	45th 46th	Elected in 1876. Re-elected in 1878. Retired.	1873–1893; Dauphin, Lebanon, and Northumberland counties
Samuel F. Barr (Harrisburg)	Republican	March 4, 1881 – March 3, 1885	47th 48th	Elected in 1880. Re-elected in 1882. Retired.	1873–1893; Dauphin, Lebanon, and Northumberland counties
Franklin Bound (Milton)	Republican	March 4, 1885 – March 3, 1889	49th 50th	Elected in 1884. Re-elected in 1886. Retired.	1873–1893; Dauphin, Lebanon, and Northumberland counties
John W. Rife (Middletown)	Republican	March 4, 1889 – March 3, 1893	51st 52nd	Elected in 1888. Re-elected in 1890. Retired.	1873–1893; Dauphin, Lebanon, and Northumberland counties
Ephraim M. Woomer (Lebanon)	Republican	March 4, 1893 – March 3, 1897	53rd 54th	Elected in 1892. Re-elected in 1894. Lost renomination.	1893–1903; Dauphin, Lebanon, and Perry counties
Marlin E. Olmsted (Harrisburg)	Republican	March 4, 1897 – March 3, 1903	55th 56th 57th	Elected in 1896. Re-elected in 1898. Re-elected in 1900. Redistricted to the 18th district.	1893–1903; Dauphin, Lebanon, and Perry counties
Charles F. Wright (Susquehanna)	Republican	March 4, 1903 – March 3, 1905	58th	Redistricted from the 15th district and re-elected in 1902. Retired.	1903–1913; Bradford, Susquehanna, and Wyoming counties
Mial E. Lilley (Towanda)	Republican	March 4, 1905 – March 3, 1907	59th	Elected in 1904. Lost re-election.	1903–1913; Bradford, Susquehanna, and Wyoming counties
George W. Kipp (Towanda)	Democratic	March 4, 1907 – March 3, 1909	60th	Elected in 1906. Retired to run for state treasurer.	1903–1913; Bradford, Susquehanna, and Wyoming counties
Charles C. Pratt (New Milford)	Republican	March 4, 1909 – March 3, 1911	61st	Elected in 1908. Lost re-election.	1903–1913; Bradford, Susquehanna, and Wyoming counties
George W. Kipp (Towanda)	Democratic	March 4, 1911 – July 24, 1911	62nd	Elected in 1910. Died.	1903–1913; Bradford, Susquehanna, and Wyoming counties
Vacant		July 24, 1911 – November 7, 1911	62nd		1903–1913; Bradford, Susquehanna, and Wyoming counties
William D. B. Ainey (Montrose)	Republican	November 7, 1911 – March 3, 1915	62nd 63rd	Elected to finish Kipp's term. Re-elected in 1912. [data missing]	1903–1913; Bradford, Susquehanna, and Wyoming counties
William D. B. Ainey (Montrose)	Republican	November 7, 1911 – March 3, 1915	62nd 63rd	Elected to finish Kipp's term. Re-elected in 1912. [data missing]	1913–1933; Bradford, Susquehanna, Wayne, and Wyoming counties
Louis T. McFadden (Canton)	Republican	March 4, 1915 – March 3, 1923	64th 65th 66th 67th	Elected in 1914. Re-elected in 1916. Re-elected in 1918. Re-elected in 1920. Redistricted to the 15th district.	1913–1933; Bradford, Susquehanna, Wayne, and Wyoming counties
William M. Croll (Reading)	Democratic	March 4, 1923 – March 3, 1925	68th	Elected in 1922. Lost re-election.	1913–1933; Bradford, Susquehanna, Wayne, and Wyoming counties
Charles J. Esterly (Reading)	Republican	March 4, 1925 – March 3, 1927	69th	Elected in 1924. Retired.	1913–1933; Bradford, Susquehanna, Wayne, and Wyoming counties
Robert G. Bushong (Sinking Spring)	Republican	March 4, 1927 – March 3, 1929	70th	Elected in 1926. Retired.	1913–1933; Bradford, Susquehanna, Wayne, and Wyoming counties
Charles J. Esterly (Sally Ann Furnace)	Republican	March 4, 1929 – March 3, 1931	71st	Elected in 1928. Retired.	1913–1933; Bradford, Susquehanna, Wayne, and Wyoming counties
Norton L. Litchtenwalner (Allentown)	Democratic	March 4, 1931 – March 3, 1933	72nd	Elected in 1930. Lost re-election.	1913–1933; Bradford, Susquehanna, Wayne, and Wyoming counties
William E. Richardson (Reading)	Democratic	March 4, 1933 – January 3, 1937	73rd 74th	Elected in 1932. Re-elected in 1934. Lost renomination.	1933–1943 [data missing]
Guy L. Moser (Douglassville)	Democratic	January 3, 1937 – January 3, 1943	75th 76th 77th	Elected in 1936. Re-elected in 1938. Re-elected in 1940. Lost renomination.	1933–1943 [data missing]
Daniel K. Hoch (Reading)	Democratic	January 3, 1943 – January 3, 1945	78th	Elected in 1942. Redistricted to the 13th district.	[data missing]
Wilson D. Gillette (Towanda)	Republican	January 3, 1945 – August 7, 1951	79th 80th 81st 82nd	Redistricted from the 15th district and re-elected in 1944. Re-elected in 1946. Re-elected in 1948. Re-elected in 1950. Died.	[data missing]
Vacant		August 7, 1951 – November 6, 1951	82nd		[data missing]
Joseph L. Carrigg (Susquehanna)	Republican	November 6, 1951 – January 3, 1953	82nd	Elected to finish Gillette's term. Redistricted to the 10th district.	[data missing]
George M. Rhodes (Reading)	Democratic	January 3, 1953 – January 3, 1963	83rd 84th 85th 86th 87th	Redistricted from the 13th district and re-elected in 1952. Re-elected in 1954. Re-elected in 1956. Re-elected in 1958. Re-elected in 1960. Redistricted to the 6th district.	1943–1953 [data missing]
William S. Moorhead (Pittsburgh)	Democratic	January 3, 1963 – January 3, 1981	88th 89th 90th 91st 92nd 93rd 94th 95th 96th	Redistricted from the 28th district and re-elected in 1962. Re-elected in 1964. Re-elected in 1966. Re-elected in 1968. Re-elected in 1970. Re-elected in 1972. Re-elected in 1974. Re-elected in 1976. Re-elected in 1978. Retired.	[data missing]
William J. Coyne (Pittsburgh)	Democratic	January 3, 1981 – January 3, 2003	97th 98th 99th 100th 101st 102nd 103rd 104th 105th 106th 107th	Elected in 1980. Re-elected in 1982. Re-elected in 1984. Re-elected in 1986. Re-elected in 1988. Re-elected in 1990. Re-elected in 1992. Re-elected in 1994. Re-elected in 1996. Re-elected in 1998. Re-elected in 2000. Retired.	[data missing]
Mike Doyle (Forest Hills)	Democratic	January 3, 2003 – January 3, 2019	108th 109th 110th 111th 112th 113th 114th 115th	Redistricted from the 18th district and re-elected in 2002. Re-elected in 2004. Re-elected in 2006. Re-elected in 2008. Re-elected in 2010. Re-elected in 2012. Re-elected in 2014. Re-elected in 2016. Redistricted to the 18th district.	2003–2013
Mike Doyle (Forest Hills)	Democratic	January 3, 2003 – January 3, 2019	108th 109th 110th 111th 112th 113th 114th 115th	Redistricted from the 18th district and re-elected in 2002. Re-elected in 2004. Re-elected in 2006. Re-elected in 2008. Re-elected in 2010. Re-elected in 2012. Re-elected in 2014. Re-elected in 2016. Redistricted to the 18th district.	2013–2019
Guy Reschenthaler (Peters Township)	Republican	January 3, 2019 – present	116th 117th 118th 119th	Elected in 2018. Re-elected in 2020. Re-elected in 2022. Re-elected in 2024. Re-elected in 2026.	2019–2023
Guy Reschenthaler (Peters Township)	Republican	January 3, 2019 – present	116th 117th 118th 119th	Elected in 2018. Re-elected in 2020. Re-elected in 2022. Re-elected in 2024. Re-elected in 2026.	2023–

== Recent election results ==
=== 2012 ===
Pennsylvania's 14th congressional district, 2012
Party	Candidate	Votes	%
Democratic	Mike Doyle (incumbent)	251,932	76.9
Republican	Hans Lessmann	75,702	23.1
Total votes		327,634	100.0
Democratic hold			

=== 2014 ===
Pennsylvania's 14th congressional district, 2014
Party	Candidate	Votes	%
Democratic	Mike Doyle (incumbent)	148,351	100.0
Total votes		148,351	100.0
Democratic hold			

=== 2016 ===
Pennsylvania's 14th congressional district, 2016
Party	Candidate	Votes	%
Democratic	Mike Doyle (incumbent)	255,293	74.4
Republican	Lenny McAllister	87,999	25.6
Total votes		343,292	100.0
Democratic hold			

=== 2018 ===
Pennsylvania's 14th congressional district, 2018
Party	Candidate	Votes	%
Republican	Guy Reschenthaler	151,386	57.9
Democratic	Bibiana Boerio	110,051	42.1
Total votes		261,437	100.0
Republican gain from Democratic			

=== 2020 ===
Pennsylvania's 14th congressional district, 2020
Party	Candidate	Votes	%
Republican	Guy Reschenthaler (incumbent)	241,688	64.7
Democratic	Bill Marx	131,895	35.3
Total votes		373,583	100.0
Republican hold			

=== 2022 ===
Pennsylvania's 14th congressional district, 2022
Party	Candidate	Votes	%
Republican	Guy Reschenthaler (incumbent)	Unopposed	
Total votes		230,865	100.0
Republican hold			

=== 2024 ===
Pennsylvania's 14th congressional district, 2024
Party	Candidate	Votes	%
Republican	Guy Reschenthaler (incumbent)	268,380	66.6
Democratic	Chris Dziados	134,755	33.4
Total votes		403,135	100.0
Republican hold			

== See also ==
- List of United States congressional districts
- Pennsylvania's congressional districts

U.S. House of Representatives
Preceded by New Jersey's 5th congressional district	Home district of the speaker of the House; July 4, 1861 – March 4, 1863	Succeeded by Indiana's 9th congressional district
