= Laurel Valley Middle and High School =

Coordinates: 40.35722°N 79.10595°W

Location
- 114 Education Lane; New Florence, Pennsylvania 15944

Information
- Type: Public
- Opened: 1961
- Closed: 2010
- Faculty: About 40
- Grades: 7-12
- Colors: Black and Red
- Team name: Rams

Laurel Valley Middle and High School was an American public high school, located near New Florence, Pennsylvania in Westmoreland County. The school served approximately 300 students who lived in the following municipalities:

the Boroughs of :

- Bolivar
- New Florence
- Seward
- all of St. Clair Township
- and part of Fairfield Township.

== Building history ==
The former school building was built in 1960 by Gamble and Gamble Construction Company of Bolivar, PA, made of concrete, and heated by propane fuel. In 1976 an addition was built. The school was renovated at the beginning of the 21st century. The school remains unused as it is owned by the Ligonier Valley School District.

== School history ==
In 1952 the Laurel Valley Joint School District was established, each of the above municipalities forfeiting their independent school systems. The students of secondary school age attended Bolivar High School until 1961, when the present Laurel Valley High School was completed. In 1966, under state law, Laurel Valley and Ligonier Valley School Districts merged, creating the Ligonier Valley School District. In 2010, the Ligonier Valley School Board had a public hearing and voted in April of that year to close the school by a vote of 8-1.
