= Ligonier Valley School District =

School district in Pennsylvania

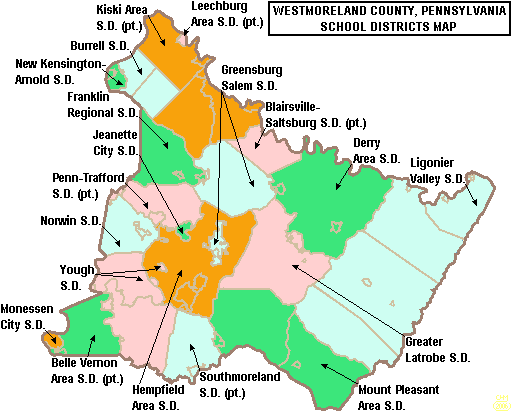
- 339 West Main Street Ligonier, Pennsylvania, 15658

District information
- Type: Public
- Motto: Pride and Ambition–A Ligonier Valley Tradition
- Grades: Pre K to 12th Grade
- Superintendent: Timothy Kantor
- School board: Ligonier Valley School Board

Students and staff
- Students: 1593 as of 2019
- Athletic conference: W.P.I.A.L.
- District mascot: Ram
- Colors: Red and Black

Other information
- Website: lvsd.k12.pa.us

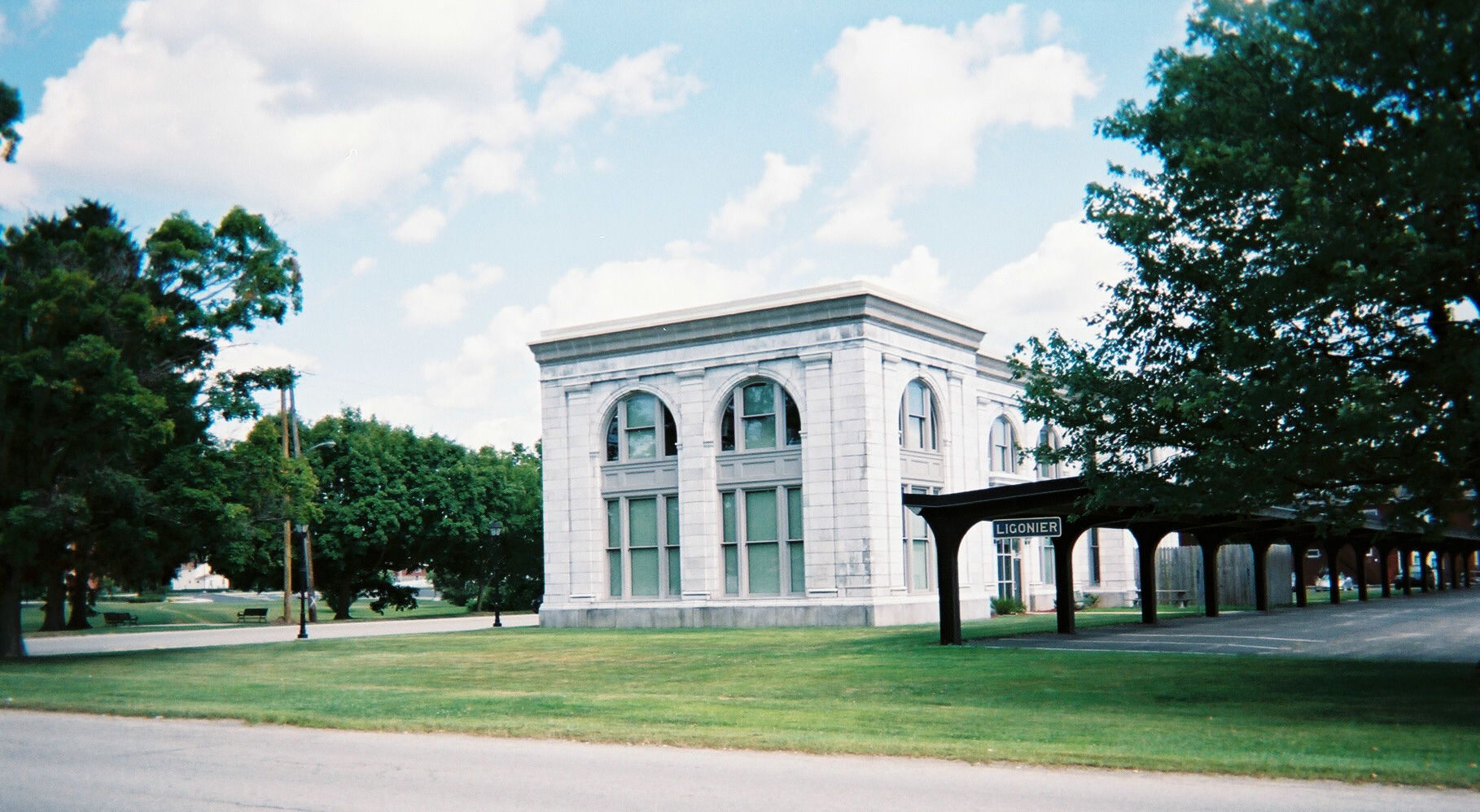
School district offices in historic train station

Ligonier Valley School District is a public school district in Westmoreland County, Pennsylvania. The boroughs of Ligonier, Laurel Mountain, Bolivar, Seward, New Florence, as well as the townships of Cook, St. Clair, Ligonier, and Fairfield are within district boundaries.

== Schools ==
=== Elementary schools ===
- R.K. Mellon Elementary School (Grades Pre-K-5)
- Laurel Valley Elementary School (Grades Pre-K-5)

=== Middle school ===
- Ligonier Valley Middle School (Grades 6–8)

=== High school ===
- Ligonier Valley High School (Grades 9–12)

== Vocational Technical School ==
Students in Grades 10–12 at the district's high school have the opportunity to attend the Eastern Westmoreland Career and Technology Center in Derry Township.

== Athletic Conference ==
Prior to the 2019-20 School year, Ligonier Valley School District was a member of PIAA District VI and the Heritage Conference. Beginning as of the 2020-21 School year, the district is now a member of PIAA District VII and WPIAL
