= Killing of Lloyd Reed =

2015 death of U.S. police officer

- Reed c. early 2010s
- Date: November 28, 2015
- Time: 9:15 p.m. (EST)
- Location: New Florence, Pennsylvania, United States; 40.3817°N 79.0747°W
- Type: Homicide
- Motive: Self-defense
- Perpetrator: Ray Shetler Jr.
- Deaths: 1
- Injuries: 1
- Arrests: 1
- Accused: Shetler
- Charges: First- and third-degree murder, theft by unlawful taking, receiving stolen property, simple assault, terroristic threats, harassment
- Trial: February 2018
- Convictions: Acquitted of murder, assault, making terroristic threats and harassment; convicted of theft and receiving stolen property
- Sentence: 11 1/2–23 months

On the evening of November 28, 2015, Lloyd Reed (born October 29, 1961), a police officer for St. Clair Township, Pennsylvania, United States, responded to a domestic disturbance report at a house in the borough of New Florence. He was shot and killed during an exchange of fire with Ray Shetler Jr., who had been violently and drunkenly arguing with his girlfriend. Shetler was charged with murder; he said Reed had fired first and not clearly identified himself as a police officer. In 2018, a Westmoreland County jury acquitted him of that charge and found him guilty of two lesser charges in the case related to his theft of a pickup truck during his escape along with charges arising from the original domestic violence incident. Most of the time he was sentenced to was credited as time served while awaiting trial.

In 2021, Shetler was arrested on charges of assaulting another police officer during an arrest for violating probation on the earlier charges. He claims that one of the arresting officers deliberately blinded him in one eye as retaliation for Reed's death. In 2023, he was convicted of charges arising from that incident.

== Background ==
After graduating from Conemaugh Township High School and serving in the Army, Lloyd Reed, a native of Hollsopple, had worked as a police officer in the rural areas southeast of the Pittsburgh metropolitan area. Following stints with the Seward and Hooversville departments, the majority of his career was with the Seven Springs department, until it was disbanded in 2010. He met his wife when he pulled her over for speeding. By late 2015 he was working part-time for the St. Clair Township police, holding the rank of sergeant.

In the early 2000s, Ray Shetler Jr. had been a standout athlete on the baseball and football teams at Laurel Valley High School, near the borough of New Florence, within St. Clair Township. (Note: It has since been merged with Ligonier Valley High School) Since high school he had remained in the area, where he had compiled a criminal record. A 2005 guilty plea to a charge of conspiracy to commit simple assault drew two years of probation, and in 2013 he was convicted of another assault charge. The one year of probation he was sentenced to for that was extended another year in late 2014 after he violated it; it was still in effect in November 2015.

In late 2014, Shetler, by then 31, moved into a house on Ligonier Avenue in New Florence with his girlfriend, Kristin Luther. She later testified that the couple planned to marry. In October 2015 Shetler received another two years of probation after pleading guilty to reckless endangerment. Shetler had met Reed; he told investigators that on November 27, 2015, the two had a brief conversation about some firewood Reed was considering buying from him.

== Killing ==
At 9 p.m. on November 28, 2015, Pennsylvania State Police (PSP) received a 9-1-1 call from Luther. The couple had argued when she woke him up after he fell asleep an hour earlier in bed still holding a beer. Still drunk, he became violent and began breaking things around the house. "All I wanted was for them to take Ray out of the house so he wouldn't break anything because he was mad", she said later. At some point during this rampage, a wood-burning stove had malfunctioned, filling the house with smoke. Luther had locked herself in the bathroom after he had drunkenly struck her with the brim of a baseball cap and left her with a bloody nose. (Note: She told a newspaper later that he had never been violent with her before.) Outside, he was kicking the door, threatening to kill her and himself with a .271-caliber hunting rifle he had been preparing for the upcoming opening day of deer season. She advised the dispatcher that Shetler had the gun. When she told him the police were coming, he said "Fuck the police". The dispatcher kept her on the line and advised a state trooper responding to it of the evolving details.

State trooper Michael Dzvonik requested assistance at the scene due to the escalating situation, since reports of a possible fire at the house due to the smoke from the stove had reached dispatch. Reed responded since New Florence had no officers of its own on duty at the time and it would take Dzvonik some time to reach the house as he was 23 mi (37 km) away when the call came in. Reed was joined at the scene around 9:15 by Justin Birkert, a Seward officer who had also heard the report. The two arrived at the same time. Reed approached the house and shouted at Shetler to drop the gun. When Shetler refused, Reed fired his .40-caliber service weapon, prompting Shetler to return fire. (Note: Luther said that she had seen Reed shoot at him as he ran off from very close range, after which Shetler, who she said had the rifle slung over his shoulder and pointed downward, returned fire. She warned Reed not to kill Shetler. The PSP did not dispute the possibility that Reed had fired first but said it was impossible to prove, as the doctors who treated Shetler had left the bullet in his shoulder.)

One of the three bullets in Shetler's rifle struck Reed in his left side where a bulletproof vest he was wearing did not provide sufficient coverage against a round fired from a rifle at such close range. He had fired six shots at Shetler, who began to flee. Birkert filed a single shot at Shetler as he ran off into the night. Reed, on the ground, took out his radio and called for help before he lost consciousness. He was taken to a local hospital where he died of his injuries around 10 p.m.

Shetler, wounded in the shoulder, swam across the Conemaugh River after running northeast. Police launched a massive manhunt of the area. On the north side of the river, he broke into a pickup truck and drove it a short distance, abandoning it near some railroad track after it stopped running. A tip from a resident of the area led to him being taken into custody without further incident near the Conemaugh Generating Station at 3 a.m. November 29. He told police he had lost the rifle while crossing the river, and was taken to a hospital for treatment of his gunshot wound. Upon learning that he had shot and killed a police officer, he said that if he had known he would have taken his own life, and expressed regret that more officers had not shown up and that there were not more bullets in his gun.

On December 1, police found Shetler's rifle. It was not in the river or on its banks, but rather hidden inside a hooded sweatshirt with bloodstains and three holes under a pile of leaves near the road towards the power station that Shetler had walked to after crossing the river.

== Aftermath ==
Shetler was charged with criminal homicide the day after the shooting. Under Pennsylvania law, this is an umbrella charge that can support more specific offenses, from murder to manslaughter, later on. A week after Reed's death, Shetler was charged with additional offenses arising from his actions that night: theft by unlawful taking and receiving stolen property for the truck, and simple assault, terroristic threats and harassment in the domestic violence incident that had led his girlfriend to call the police.

Governor Tom Wolf ordered all state buildings to fly their flags at half-staff in Reed's memory. The St. Clair police received many accounts of Reed's acts of compassion and helpfulness, such as staying with a family at their disabled vehicle until it could be towed; fellow officers recalled how much they had learned from him about how to treat people. Officers came from all over Pennsylvania and other states to Reed's funeral December 3, held at Cambria County War Memorial Arena in Johnstown.

Shetler was held without bail. Two weeks after the killing, a preliminary hearing was held on the charges against him. He did not testify, but made some statements about Reed's death ancillary to the proceedings. "Everyone in Ligonier knows I wouldn't do a thing like this," he said as he entered the courtroom. During the state's presentation of its evidence against him, when it described the circumstances of the shooting, Shetler audibly whispered to his attorney, Marc Daffner, that Reed's flashlight was pointed directly at his face. The state trooper who had interviewed him twice about what had happened testified that Shetler changed his story. During the first interview he had said he did not know Reed was a police officer, but the second time he admitted hearing Reed's demand that he drop the gun. At that time Shetler said he was still heavily intoxicated from the alcohol and drugs he had consumed, so what Reed said might not have fully registered. Upon learning that he had shot and killed a police officer, Shetler told the trooper that if he had known that at the time he would have killed himself.

Judge Denise Thiel denied Daffner's request to drop the "garbage" lesser charges, and ordered Shetler held for trial. In March 2016 Westmoreland County district attorney John Peck filed notice that in the event of a conviction the state would seek the death penalty. Shetler was held without bail since he was facing first-degree murder, a capital charge. In 2017 Meaghan Bilik-DeFazio, the judge presiding over the trial in Common Pleas Court, denied Daffner's motion to dismiss the charges for insufficient evidence.

== Trial ==
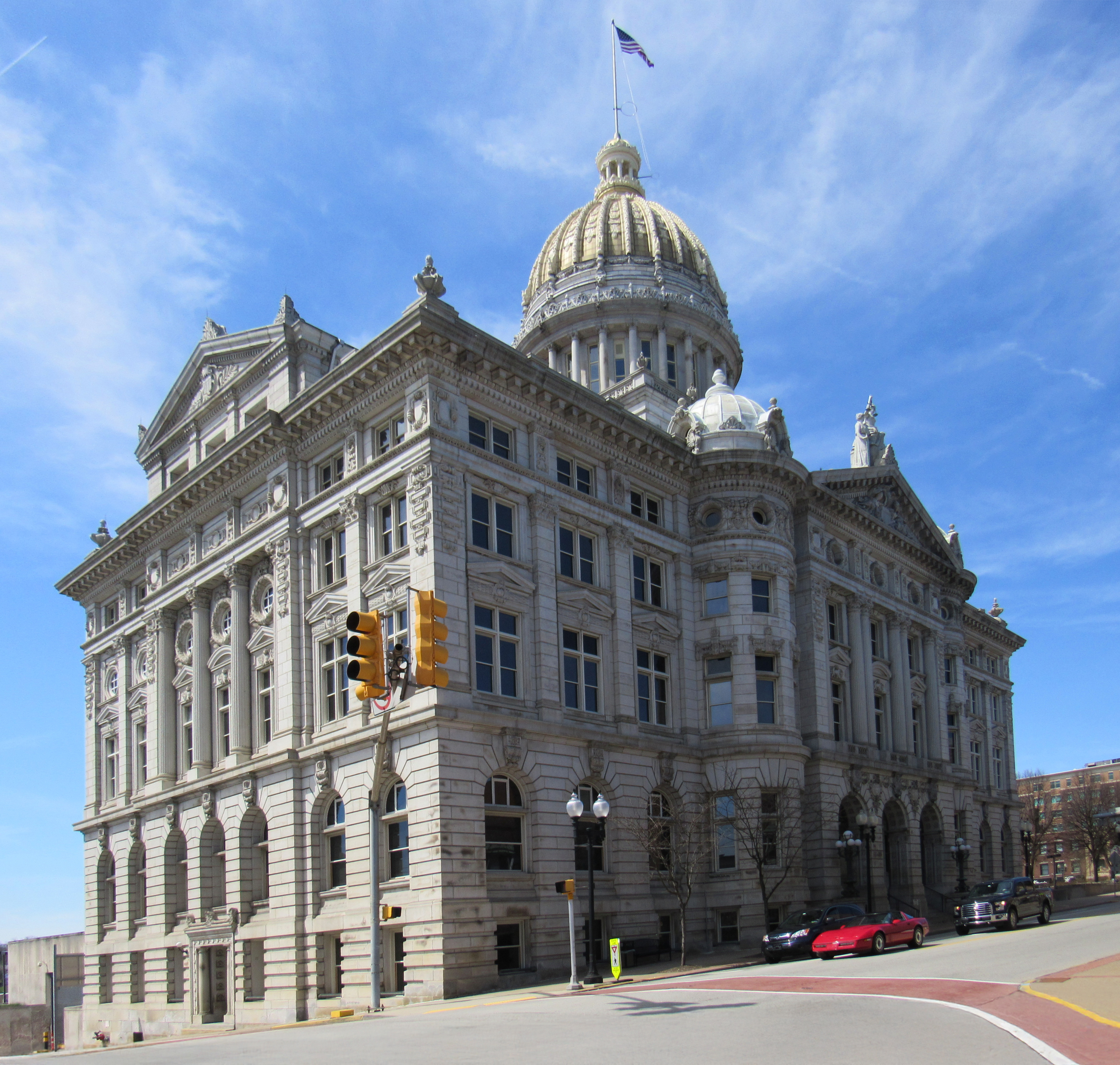
The Westmoreland County Courthouse

When Shetler went on trial in February 2018 at the county courthouse in Greensburg, Peck drew a contrast in his opening argument between the lifetime of public service and dedication Reed brought to that night, whereas Shetler "woke up irritated, full of venom and content with belligerence." Daffner agreed with Peck's characterization of the case as a tragedy, but for different reasons. He told the jury that he understood if they believed his client was guilty, because he had at first too. He had hoped Shetler would not call him, and when he did, initially refused several requests to retain him. "This is not a case of murder, but self-defense," Daffner said.

The prosecution called 22 witnesses and introduced 190 exhibits into evidence, many of them related to proving that Reed had died as a result of Shetler firing at him. The pathologist who had performed the autopsy on Reed testified that the bullet had pierced the left ventricle of his heart. The jury was taken, along with Shetler, to see both the scene of the shooting and the area across the river where Shetler was captured, which the prosecution said was necessary to support its argument that his lengthy flight on foot and across the river from where he shot Reed indicated he was aware of what he had done.

Prosecution witnesses included the head of security at the generating station, who testified that when he first saw Shetler trying to break into an excavator, Shetler charged at him while swearing loudly. When state troopers arrived, Shetler tried to convince them his gunshot wound had been inflicted by the witness. One trooper, Michael Colo, described Shetler as "arrogant and belligerent", saying that he could not surrender due to his injury and challenging Colo to shoot him as "I've already been shot by one coward tonight" and identifying himself as "Tom fucking Sawyer" when he finally gave himself up.

The state police investigator who interviewed Shetler recalled how he had blamed the entire incident on Luther having awakened him. Two of the paramedics who treated Shetler after the arrest also took the stand. One, a man, said that Shetler's belligerence had continued, that he expressed a wish for more bullets in his gun and more police to respond. Shetler told him that the incident had occurred when he was out in his yard chopping firewood and that he had not realized the apparent trespasser was a police officer. By contrast, a female paramedic testified that Shetler was polite and that he had asked her repeatedly if it was true that he had killed a police officer.

The defense case consisted of five witnesses; Luther and Shetler came last. She maintained that she saw Reed, whom she knew at the time was a police officer, fire first from 20–30 feet (6.1–9.1 m) away. Shetler ran away, and then raised his hands as if to surrender, whereupon Reed fired again. The shot that hit Shetler knocked his gun from his shoulder, after which he returned fire from his hip. Shetler recalled hearing someone tell him to put the gun down, and gunfire beginning as soon as he moved. On cross-examination, Shetler gave the same account as Luther, admitting to Peck that he meant to kill whoever was firing at him but that it was a lucky shot as he did not have time to pick it up and aim. Peck pressured him on why he ran from the house if he thought the intruders intended to commit a crime when Luther was still present, putatively leaving her on her own. Shetler responded that he believed he was the target. "I was scatterbrained," he said. "I just was running for my life".

In closing arguments, Beck made much of Shetler's admission that he had shot to kill and scoffed at his insistence that he had shot from the hip. After a week of testimony, the case went to the jury, which spent 20 hours over two days deliberating. It returned a verdict of not guilty on the murder and domestic violence charges, but convicted Shetler of the theft charges. One juror later explained that instructions they had asked the judge for clarifying the law on self-defense led them to decide the case strictly on the law and discard any what-if questions. The best thing Daffner had done, he said, was put Shetler on the stand.

== Reactions to acquittal ==
Acquittals in cases where the defendant was charged with the murder of a police officer in the line of duty are rare; Shetler's was only the fourth such verdict out of 64 defendants so charged in Pennsylvania since 1980. Many residents of the area were taken aback by the verdict. Residents in Hollsopple put blue lights on their porches in tribute to Reed three days after the verdict. "It's unfortunate that [Reed] got killed", said one man who had known Reed for years. "A lot of people hate me around here for saying this, but it doesn't make me love [him] any less."

Daffner said afterwards "A case like this, there really aren't any winners, but of course we're pleased with the verdict". Peck was disappointed, "but on the other hand, I can't fault the jury because they spent at least 20 hours reviewing the fairly substantial amount of evidence that was put in before them". Shetler's stepfather, who like other family members was not expecting the result, was admonished by a deputy sheriff over his elated shout. "I wanted to get up and run around", he said. "First time justice worked out."

Police advocacy groups criticized the verdict and derided the jury. "An innocent man doesn't flee the scene of a murder, lead police on a six-hour manhunt and get rid of their clothing and weapon", said Les Neri, head of the state Fraternal Order of Police. "It's unconscionable that a jury did not do the right thing in this senseless act of killing a police officer". Randy Sutton, a "shocked and disgusted" spokesman for Blue Lives Matter, said "[t]he jury collectively didn't have the combined IQ that equals triple digits." The National Police Association used the incident to call for federal legislation making violence against law enforcement personnel a hate crime. "The public has become more questioning of police behavior in terms of using deadly force," observed Delores Jones-Brown, a professor at John Jay College of Criminal Justice.

== Subsequent developments ==
Shetler remained in jail after the verdict since he had been convicted on the theft charges. Bilik-Defazio set bond at $100,000 for him to be freed pending sentencing; Peck argued for more, calling Shetler a flight risk based on his behavior after the killing. In May 2018 he was sentenced to 11 1/2 to 23 months in prison, followed by five years of probation. Most of the imprisonment was credited to time served and he was released shortly afterwards. Daffner said Shetler planned to leave the area; he had a construction job waiting for him in Saltsburg, not far from New Florence in Indiana County.

=== 2021 arrest and assault conviction ===
In December 2021, after Shetler had missed meetings with his probation officer and failed a drug test, a warrant was issued for his arrest. Shetler became aware of it and, in his later retelling, intended to surrender on his own. He knew many local police held a grudge against him due to his acquittal and would use excessive force against him if they had to take him into custody. "I figured they would find me and put a fucking whooping on me, retaliate," he testified later. After hiding in the woods outside Seward, Shetler had originally planned to visit his girlfriend (Note: Not Luther, who died earlier that year.) at her trailer near New Florence to say goodbye, then turn himself in the next day. But police learned of his presence there and at least 10 state troopers and deputy sheriffs arrived to confront him.

The responding officers said they considered Shetler a high risk for violence because of the earlier incident, and took precautions such as arriving in marked police vehicles with lights flashing, all officers uniformed and clearly verbally identifying themselves as police. Shetler described them as "[coming] in hot ... look[ing] like killers." He hid in the trailer between a futon and the wall. When police found him, he alleged they jumped on him, with one beating him with a flashlight. Another officer then, Shetler alleges, deliberately fired a Taser into his eye, saying "This is for Reed!" The state trooper said he had fired from four feet (1.2 m) away at Shetler's midsection; when Shetler moved towards him rapidly he was struck in the eye instead. Since the damage could not be surgically repaired he was left blind in that eye.

The police present later testified they had also administered "compliance strikes" during a 60–80-second struggle in a 10-by-12-foot (3.0 by 3.7 m) bedroom. Shetler, they said, had headbutted one deputy, leaving him with a concussion and torn rotator cuff as a result of, they alleged, Shetler throwing him into a wall. (Note: In a conversation with reporters after the trial, Shetler accused the deputy of lying.) After the arrest, Shetler was additionally charged with two counts of aggravated assault, disarming a law enforcement officer and resisting arrest. He was held on $250,000 bond until he was tried in October 2023.

At trial, again with Bilik-DeFazio presiding, he was acquitted of one of the assault charges but convicted on all the other counts. At his sentencing hearing at the beginning of 2024, prosecutors called Shetler a "menace to society" and asked for the maximum sentence of 19 years. Bilik-DeFazio sentenced him to 1–2 years in prison, plus two years continued probation, for the assault and disarming convictions, and two years' probation for resisting arrest, all to be served concurrently. By the time of the conviction he had already served over a year, which made him eligible for a parole that was immediately granted.

In March 2024 Shetler was sentenced to 2 1/2 years in prison for the probation violation. He is appealing the sentence, which he is serving at State Correctional Institution – Forest.

== See also ==
- List of law enforcement officers killed in the line of duty in the United States
- Killing of Nathan Heidelberg, 2019 shooting of Texas police officer where shooter was also acquitted of murder charge
