= Ligonier Valley High School =

Coordinates: 40.25350°N 79.24335°W

Ligonier Valley Senior High School
- LVHS

Location
- 40 Springer Road; South West Pennsylvania; Ligonier, Westmoreland, Pennsylvania 15658; United States, United States

Information
- Type: Public
- Motto: Pride and Ambition–A Ligonier Valley Tradition
- Established: 1886
- School board: Ligonier Valley School Board
- School district: Ligonier Valley School District
- Superintendent: Timothy Kantor
- School number: (724)-238-9531
- Principal: Rachel Kurdziel
- Principal: Brett Marabito
- Faculty: 50
- Teaching staff: 40
- Grades: 9-12
- Age range: 13-18
- Average class size: 20-25
- Student to teacher ratio: 15:1
- Hours in school day: 7.5 to 8.0
- Campus: 1 Campus
- Colors: Red and Black
- Fight song: On Wisconsin
- Athletics: Football, Basketball, Soccer, Volleyball, Track, Swimming, Golf, Cheerleading, Wrestling, Cross Country
- Athletics conference: WPIAL
- Mascot: Ram
- Team name: Rams
- USNWR ranking: Sliver (U.S. News and World Report)
- Website: http://lvsd.k12.pa.us/

Ligonier Valley High School is a public high school in Westmoreland, Pennsylvania.

It serves approximately 500 students that live in Laurel Mountain Borough, Ligonier Borough, Ligonier Township, Cook Township, Fairfield Township, Bolivar Borough, Seward, St. Clair Township and New Florence Borough. The school is the only high school in the Ligonier Valley School District.

== History ==
A Ligonier public high school has been in existence since 1886. The current high school was built on the present site in Ligonier Township, near U.S. Route 30. The Alvin P. Carey Memorial Building opened in 1964. In 1966, under state law, Laurel Valley and Ligonier Valley School Districts merged, creating the Ligonier Valley School District. At this time, in 1966, the schools colors, green and white(Laurel Valley), and blue and white(Ligonier Valley), were changed to the current colors, red and black. At the start of the 2010-11 school term, students from the former Laurel Valley High School attendance area attend Ligonier Valley, and at that time, the mascot was changed to the Rams, reflecting Laurel Valley's mascot, from the former Ligonier Valley's mascot the Mountaineer.

== Amenities ==
The Alvin P. Carey building has air conditioning throughout the school. The auditorium which was added on in 1998, has a full stage, sound room, light control room, and dressing rooms. Seating over 500, it is used for many public events. The cafeteria has a courtyard that is surrounded on all sides which is used for outdoors studies and other events. The school also features a full size auxiliary gym and weight lifting room.

== Athletic fields/courts ==
The gymnasium has a full sized High School basketball court, two scoreboards, and seats over 600 people. The gym is used for baseball batting cages, basketball, volleyball, and training. The school features one baseball diamond in the front of the school. This newly built diamond features wireless scoring technology, dugouts built in April 2013, and fresh surface.

== Standard Bank Stadium ==
Standard Bank Stadium, home to Weller Field and the Patrick Podlucky memorial track, is used by track and field, football, and soccer. Standard Bank Stadium, which features a football field that converts into soccer, an eight-lane, tar surface, running track which is on the perimeter of the field, is the only stadium the school owns that is in use. The stadium features a 20 yard long logo that stretches from the 40 yard line to the 40 yard line. The stadium seats approximately 2,000 and with standing room holds approximately 5,000. Portable bleachers can be brought in for excess seating. Standard Bank Stadium is rarely used for public events like Relay For Life, graduation, and more.

== Athletic teams ==
Ligonier Valley participates in the Western Pennsylvania Interscholastic Athletic League. The Rams athletics are supported by the student section, The Herd.

Sport	Boys	Girls
Baseball	Class AA	
Basketball	Class AAA	Class AAA
Cross Country	Class AA	Class AA
American football	Class AA	
Golf	Class AAAA	Class AAAA
Softball		Class A
Soccer	Class AA	Class AA
Swimming and Diving	Class AA	Class AA
Track and Field	Class AA	Class AA
Volleyball		Class A
Wrestling	Class AA	

== Vocational-technical schools ==
Students in grades 10-12 can have the opportunity to attend Eastern Westmoreland Career and Technology Center in Derry Township.
