= LVSD =

LVSD may refer to:

- Left Ventricular end-systolic Dimension; see Ventricle (heart)#Dimensions
- Left ventricular systolic dysfunction; see Heart failure#Systolic dysfunction
- Ligonier Valley School District in Westmoreland County, Pennsylvania
