= Laurel Hill Furnace =

- U.S. National Register of Historic Places
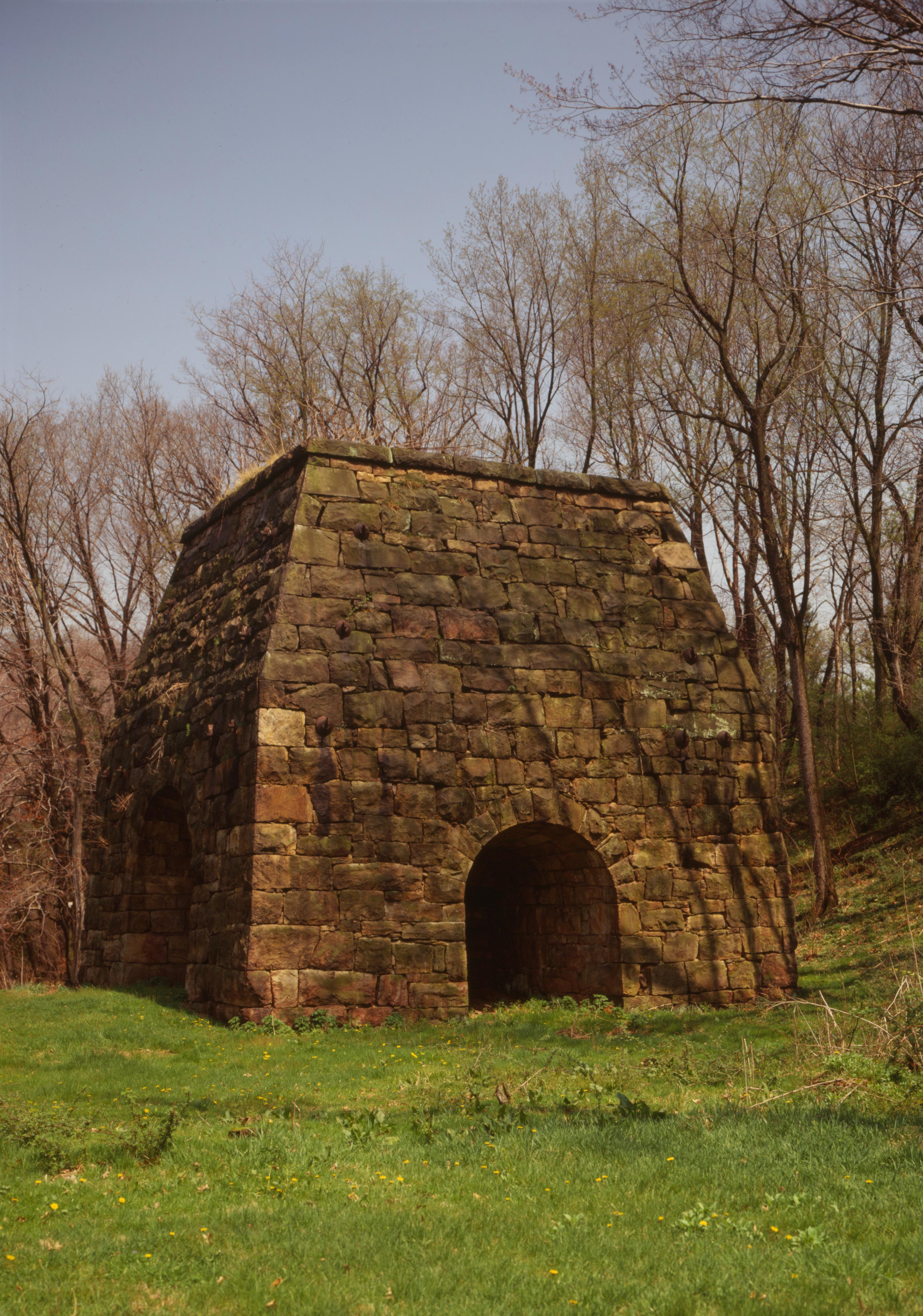
- Laurel Hill Furnace, May 1989

- Location within Pennsylvania Location within the United States
- Location: Southeast of New Florence on Baldwin Run, St. Clair Township, Pennsylvania
- Coordinates: 40°22′0″N 79°3′32″W
- Area: 1 acre (0.40 ha)
- Built: 1845
- Built by: Hezekiah Reed, Gallagher, & Hale
- NRHP reference No.: 75001679
- Added to NRHP: April 28, 1975

Laurel Hill Furnace is a historic iron furnace located at St. Clair Township, Westmoreland County, Pennsylvania. It was built in 1845, and is a rectangular cut stone furnace with four arches at its base. It remained in blast until 1855–1860. The furnace was donated to the Western Pennsylvania Conservancy in 1973.

It was added to the National Register of Historic Places in 1975.
