= Ross Furnace =

- U.S. National Register of Historic Places
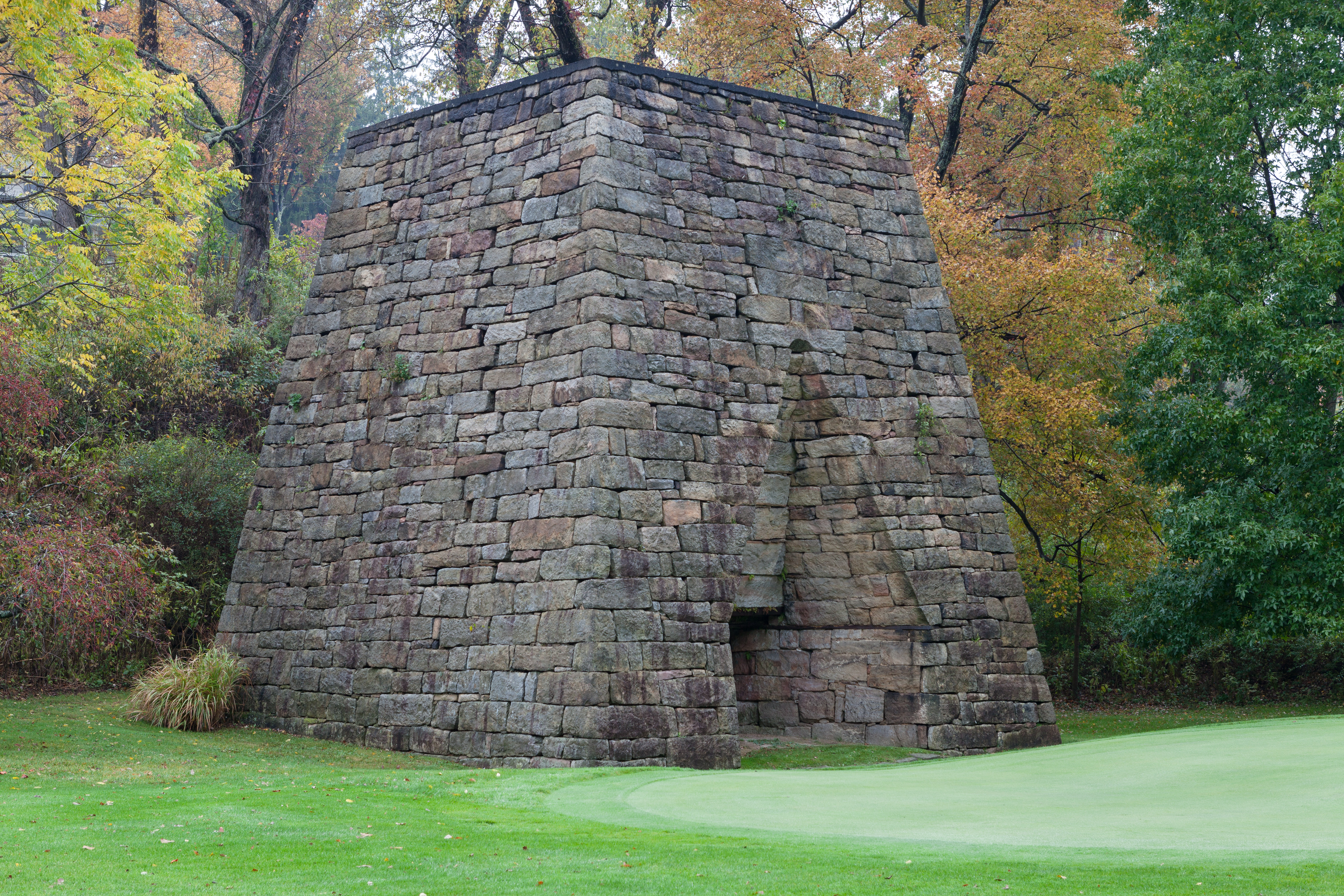
- The furnace in October, 2014

- Location within Pennsylvania Location within the United States
- Location: Southwest of Tubmill Reservoir off Pennsylvania Route 711, Fairfield Township, Pennsylvania
- Coordinates: 40°19′33″N 79°5′26″W
- Area: less than one acre
- Built: 1842
- Architectural style: Iron furnace
- MPS: Iron and Steel Resources of Pennsylvania MPS
- NRHP reference No.: 91001142
- Added to NRHP: September 6, 1991

Ross Furnace is a historic iron furnace located at Fairfield Township, Westmoreland County, Pennsylvania. It was built in 1842, and is a stone structure measuring 25 feet square at the base and 30 feet high. It has a triangular work arch and Roman blast arch. It remained in blast until about 1850–1855.

It was added to the National Register of Historic Places in 1991.
