= Eastern Westmoreland Career and Technology Center =

Coordinates: 40.30896°N 79.35946°W

Location
- 4904 State Route 982; Derry Township, Westmoreland County, Pennsylvania; Latrobe, Pennsylvania 15650; United States

Information
- School type: Public Career & Technology School
- Director: Todd Weimer
- Principal: Chris Cambell
- Staff: 14
- Faculty: 16
- Grades: 10-12
- Enrollment: 575
- Schedule: Part-Time
- Website: http://www.ewctc.net

Eastern Westmoreland Career and Technology Center is a public Career and Technical school, located near Latrobe, Pennsylvania, serving students in grades 10-12 in the eastern portion of Westmoreland County, Pennsylvania.

== Participating School Districts ==
There are three participating High Schools that send students to the center, they are as follows:

- Derry Area High School - of the Derry Area School District
- Greater Latrobe Senior High School - of the Greater Latrobe School District
- Ligonier Valley High School - of the Ligonier Valley School District.
