= Ligonier Township, Westmoreland County, Pennsylvania =

Township in Pennsylvania, US

Ligonier Township
- Township
- Township of Ligonier
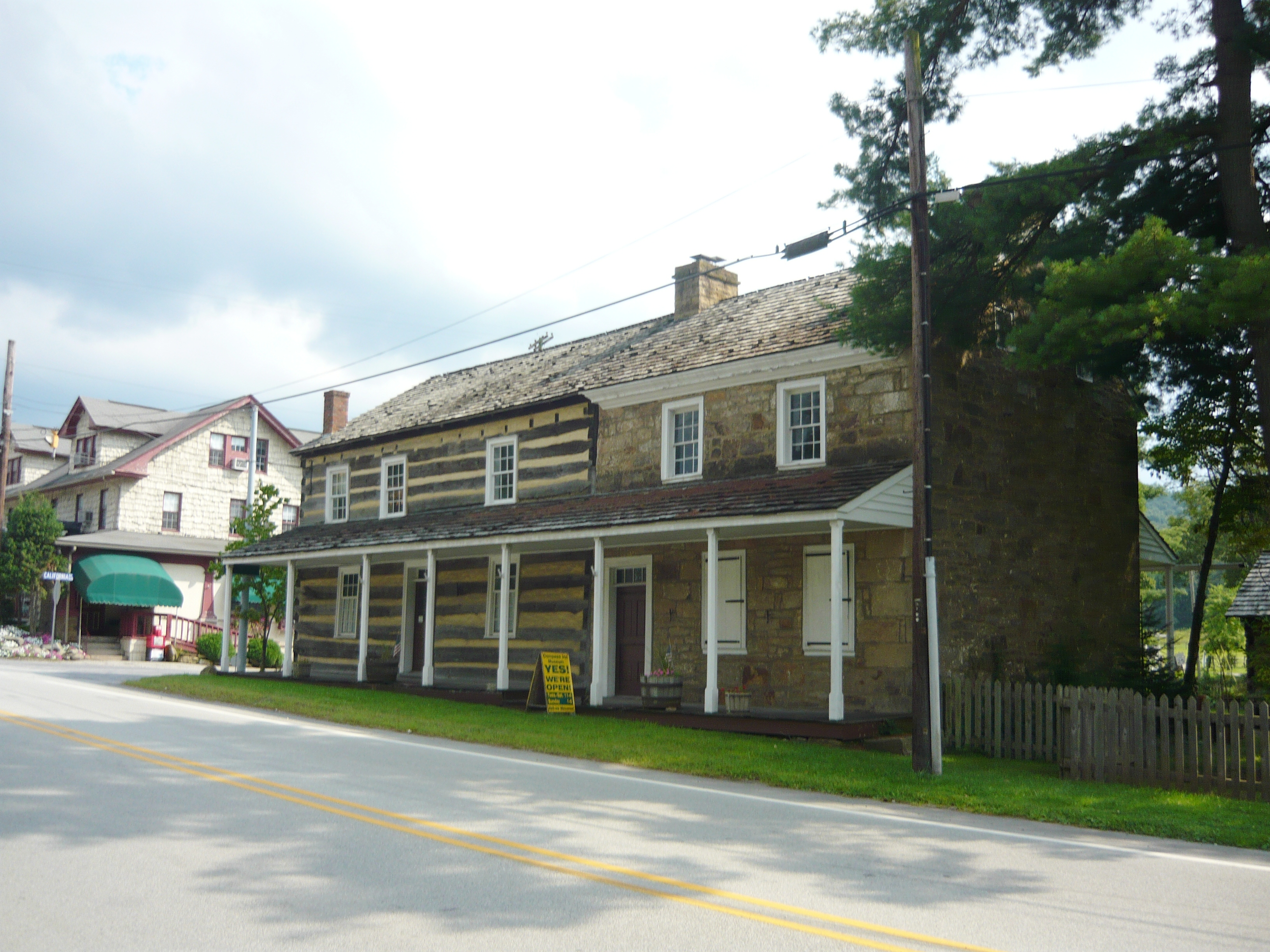
- Compass Inn (1799); National Register of Historic Places

- Logo
- Etymology: John Ligonier
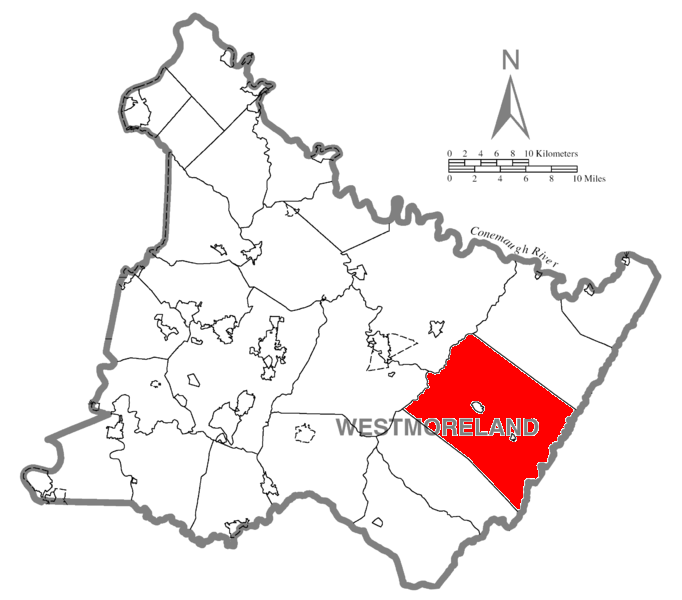
- Location of Ligonier Township in Westmoreland County, Pennsylvania

- Location of Westmoreland County in Pennsylvania
- Coordinates: 40°14′40″N 79°14′13″W
- Country: United States
- State: Pennsylvania
- County: Westmoreland
- Incorporated: 1822

Area
  - Total: 92.72 sq mi (240.14 km^{2})
  - Land: 92.42 sq mi (239.37 km^{2})
  - Water: 0.30 sq mi (0.77 km^{2})

Population (2020)
  - Total: 6,058 ▼
  - Estimate (2021): 6,025
  - Density: 70.1/sq mi (27.08/km^{2})
- Time zone: UTC-5 (EST)
  - Summer (DST): UTC-4 (EDT)
- ZIP code: 15658
- Area code: 724
- School District: Ligonier Valley School District
- Website: www.ligoniertownship.com

Ligonier Township is a township in Westmoreland County, Pennsylvania, United States. Ligonier Township entirely surrounds, but does not include, Ligonier Borough, which is a separate municipality. The township's population was 6,058 at the 2020 census.

== History ==
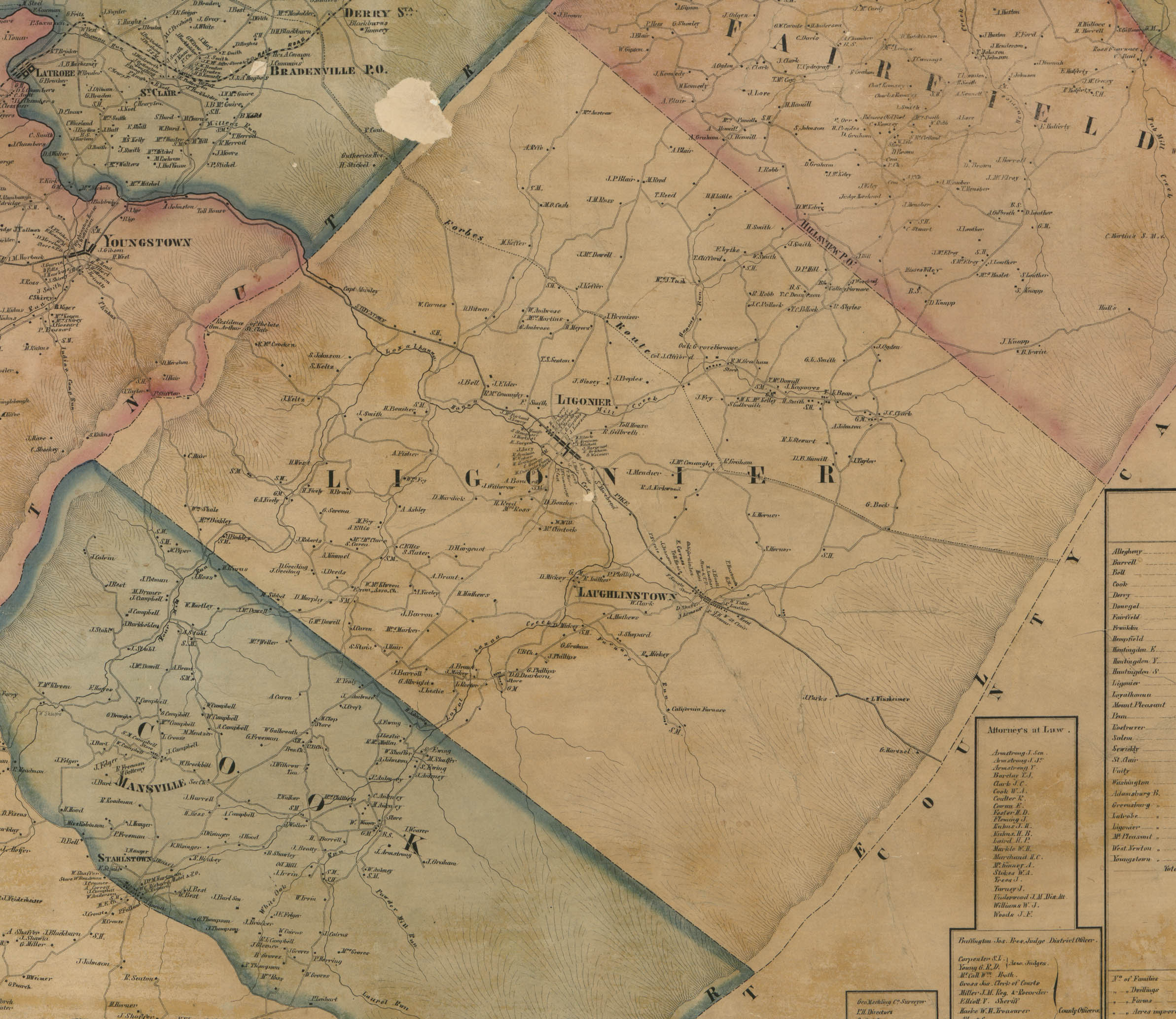
Ligonier Township, Westmoreland County, Pennsylvania, 1857

The Compass Inn was added to the National Register of Historic Places in 1995.

== Geography ==
According to the United States Census Bureau, the township has a total area of 92.1 square miles (239 km^{2}), of which 91.8 square miles (238 km^{2}) is land and 0.3 square miles (0.78 km^{2}) (0.31%) is water.

The township contains the following communities: Buttermilk Falls, Darlington, Hillsview, Laughlintown, Longbridge, McCance, Oak Grove, Shirley, Speedwell, Rector, Waterford, and Wilpen.

== Surrounding and inner neighborhoods ==
Ligonier Township has six borders including the townships of Fairfield to the northeast, Jenner (Somerset County) to the southeast, Lincoln (Somerset County) in the southeastern corner, Cook to the southwest, Unity to the lower northwest, and Derry to the upper northwest. Situated completely inside the township are the boroughs of Ligonier and Laurel Mountain.

== Government ==
The township is classed as a township of the second class of the Commonwealth of Pennsylvania. A five-person board of supervisors, elected for a six-year term, governs the township.

== Public Services ==
In 2019 the Ligonier Township police and the Ligonier Borough police both combined their respective police departments to form the Ligonier Valley Police Department (LVPD).

The LVPD is currently staffed by a Chief of Police, Sergeant and 11 patrol officers. The LVPD also employs a K-9 officer that is partnered with the Sergeant and also employs two school resource officers, one to patrol the three schools within Ligonier and another is assigned to the Valley School of Ligonier.

The Patrol officers are responsible for patrolling the Ligonier Valley which includes the villages of Waterford, Darlington, Wilpen and Laughlintown, the Borough of Ligonier and Laurel Mountain Borough.

The police department suffered tragedy in May 2015 when K-9 handler LT. Eric Eslary was killed in the line of duty in a motor vehicle accident. His K-9 Blek was also injured and made a full recovery from the accident. K-9 Blek died of natural causes in 2018.

The Ligonier Township Municipal Authority (whose board members are appointed by the supervisors) provides water and sewage service to township residents. Fire protection services are provided by a 100% totally volunteer force, from three of the township's villages. The Ligonier Township Volunteer Fire Department #1 (in the village of Waterford). The Wilpen Volunteer Fire Department of Ligonier Township (in the village of Wilpen) and The Darlington Volunteer Fire Department (in the village of Darlington).

== Demographics ==
Historical population
Census	Pop.	Note	%±
1910	3,596		—
1920	4,345		20.8%
1930	3,763		−13.4%
1940	4,446		18.2%
1950	4,690		5.5%
1960	5,566		18.7%
1970	6,278		12.8%
1980	7,513		19.7%
1990	6,979		−7.1%
2000	6,973		−0.1%
2010	6,603		−5.3%
2020	6,058		−8.3%
2021 (est.)	6,025		−0.5%
U.S. Decennial Census

As of the census of 2000, there were 6,973 people, 2,914 households, and 2,089 families residing in the township. The population density was 75.9 inhabitants per square mile (29.3/km^{2}). There were 3,556 housing units at an average density of 38.7 units per square mile (14.9 units/km^{2}). The racial makeup of the township was 99.21% White, 0.13% African American, 0.04% Native American, 0.13% Asian, 0.07% from other races, and 0.42% from two or more races. Hispanic or Latino of any race were 0.27% of the population.

There were 2,914 households, out of which 25.4% had children under the age of 18 living with them, 62.0% were married couples living together, 6.7% had a female householder with no husband present, and 28.3% were non-families. 25.0% of all households were made up of individuals, and 12.5% had someone living alone who was 65 years of age or older. The average household size was 2.36 and the average family size was 2.82.

In the township the population was spread out, with 20.3% under the age of 18, 5.7% from 18 to 24, 24.9% from 25 to 44, 28.8% from 45 to 64, and 20.3% who were 65 years of age or older. The median age was 44 years. For every 100 females, there were 96.2 males. For every 100 females age 18 and over, there were 94.1 males.

The median income for a household in the township was $36,817, and the median income for a family was $46,715. Males had a median income of $35,969 versus $23,975 for females. The per capita income for the township was $25,049. About 5.8% of families and 8.2% of the population were below the poverty line, including 9.4% of those under age 18 and 10.5% of those age 65 or over.
