= New Florence, Pennsylvania =

Borough in Pennsylvania, US

- Borough
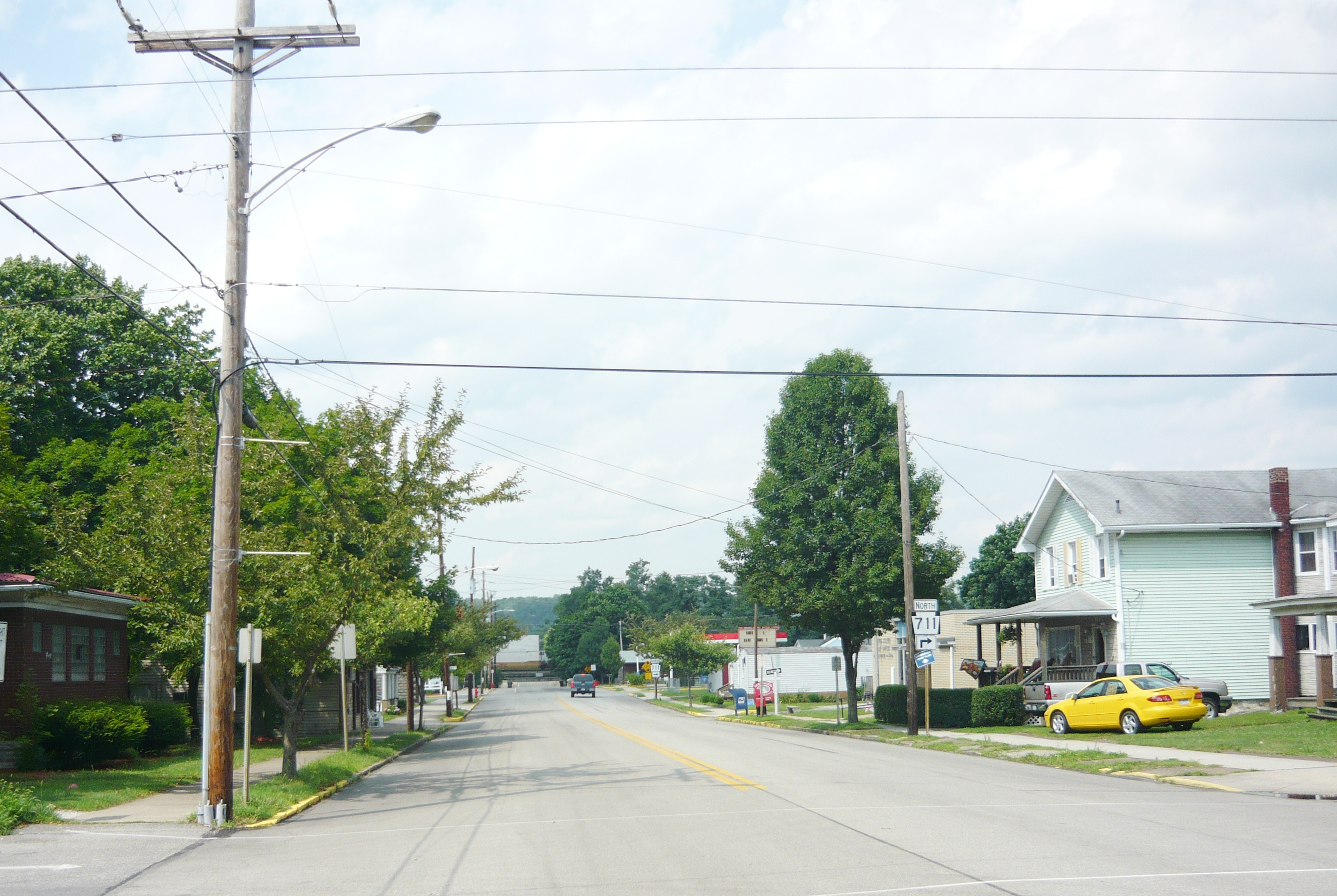
- Ligonier Street

- Location of New Florence in Westmoreland County, Pennsylvania.

- Location within Pennsylvania
- Coordinates: 40°22′47″N 79°04′29″W
- Country: United States
- State: Pennsylvania
- County: Westmoreland
- Incorporated: May 27, 1865

Government
  - Type: Borough Council

Area
  - Total: 0.33 sq mi (0.85 km^{2})
  - Land: 0.33 sq mi (0.85 km^{2})
  - Water: 0 sq mi (0.00 km^{2})
- Elevation: 1,079 ft (329 m)

Population (2020)
  - Total: 671
  - Density: 2,047.8/sq mi (790.66/km^{2})
- Time zone: UTC-5 (Eastern (EST))
  - Summer (DST): UTC-4 (EDT)
- Zip code: 15944
- Area codes: 724, 814, 878
- FIPS code: 42-53544
- Website: https://newflorenceborough.org/

New Florence is a borough that is located in Westmoreland County, Pennsylvania, United States. As of the 2020 census, New Florence had a population of 671.

It is also one of three communities within the county to use the 814 area code, alongside St. Clair and Seward.

== History ==
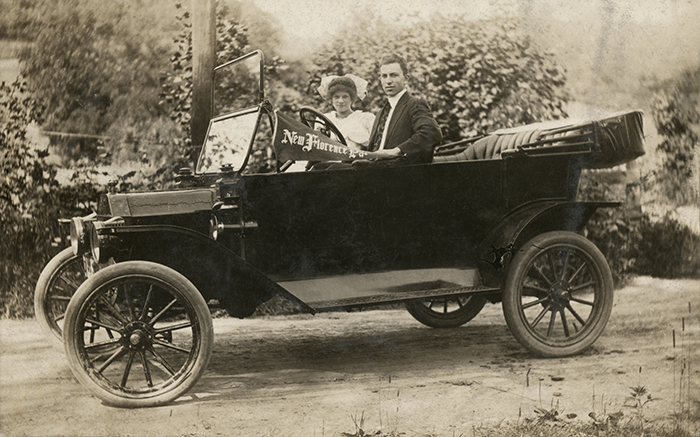
New Florence Pennsylvania c.1915

New Florence was named for the city of Florence in Italy.

In 2015 Lloyd Reed, a St. Clair Township police sergeant, was shot and killed while responding to a domestic violence call on Ligonier Street in the northern section of the borough. The shooter, Ray Shetler Jr., was acquitted of murder charges at trial in 2018, after arguing that he did not realize Reed was a police officer when he fired.

== Geography ==
New Florence is located at 40°22′47″N 79°4′29″W (40.379707, -79.074841).

According to the United States Census Bureau, the borough has a total area of 0.4 square miles (1.0 km^{2}), of which 0.3 square miles (0.78 km^{2}) is land and 0.04 square miles (0.10 km^{2}) (5.56%) is water.

== Surrounding and adjacent neighborhoods ==
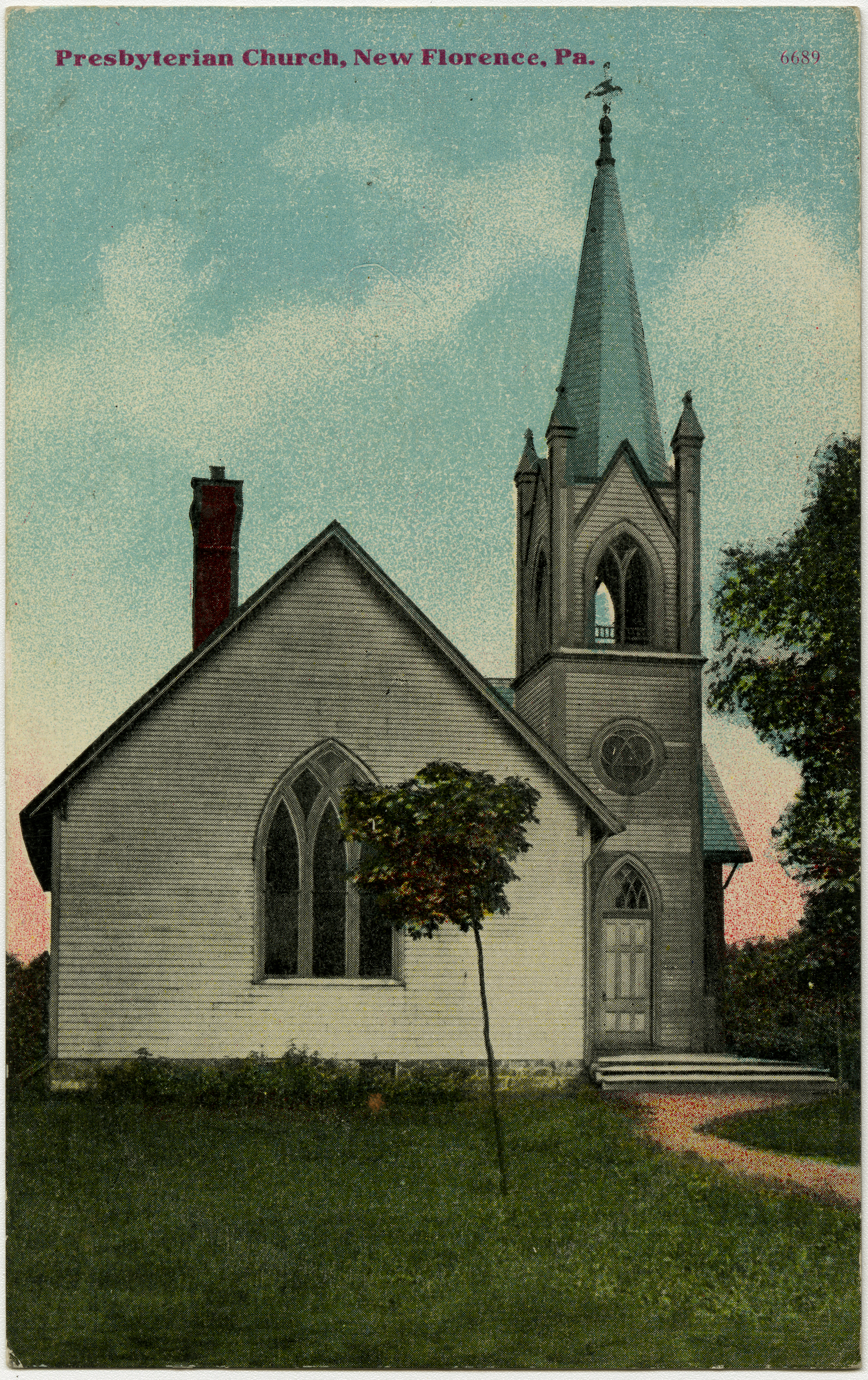
Presbyterian Church, early 20th century

New Florence is bordered by St. Clair Township to the east, south and west.

Across the Conemaugh River in Indiana County to the north, New Florence runs adjacent with West Wheatfield Township and has a direct connector via the 9th Street Bridge.

== Demographics ==
Historical population
Census	Pop.	Note	%±
1870	333		—
1880	531		59.5%
1890	683		28.6%
1900	800		17.1%
1910	717		−10.4%
1920	730		1.8%
1930	796		9.0%
1940	864		8.5%
1950	924		6.9%
1960	958		3.7%
1970	929		−3.0%
1980	855		−8.0%
1990	854		−0.1%
2000	784		−8.2%
2010	689		−12.1%
2020	671		−2.6%

As of the census of 2000, there were 784 people, 331 households, and 225 families living in the borough. The population density was 2,242.4 inhabitants per square mile (865.8/km^{2}). There were 365 housing units at an average density of 1,044.0 per square mile (403.1/km^{2}).

The racial makeup of the borough was 99.11% White, 0.13% Native American, 0.13% from other races, and 0.64% from two or more races. Hispanic or Latino of any race were 0.13% of the population.

There were 331 households, out of which 27.2% had children under the age of eighteen living with them, 50.8% were married couples living together, 14.2% had a female householder with no husband present, and 32.0% were non-families. 29.9% of all households were made up of individuals, and 16.9% had someone living alone who was sixty-five years of age or older.

The average household size was 2.37 and the average family size was 2.91.

Within the borough, the population was spread out, with 23.3% of residents who were under the age of eighteen, 6.9% who were aged eighteen to twenty-four, 24.5% who were aged twenty-five to forty-four, 24.4% who were aged forty-five to sixty-four, and 20.9% who were sixty-five years of age or older. The median age was forty-two years.

For every one hundred females, there were 93.6 males. For every one hundred females who were aged eighteen or older, there were 79.4 males.

The median income for a household in the borough was $24,688, and the median income for a family was $28,750. Males had a median income of $31,667 compared with that of $19,792 for females.

The per capita income for the borough was $13,449.

Approximately 19.3% of families and 21.6% of the population were living below the poverty line, including 42.9% of those who were under the age of eighteen and 7.2% of those who were aged sixty-five or older.
