= Bolivar, Pennsylvania =

Borough in Pennsylvania, US

- Borough
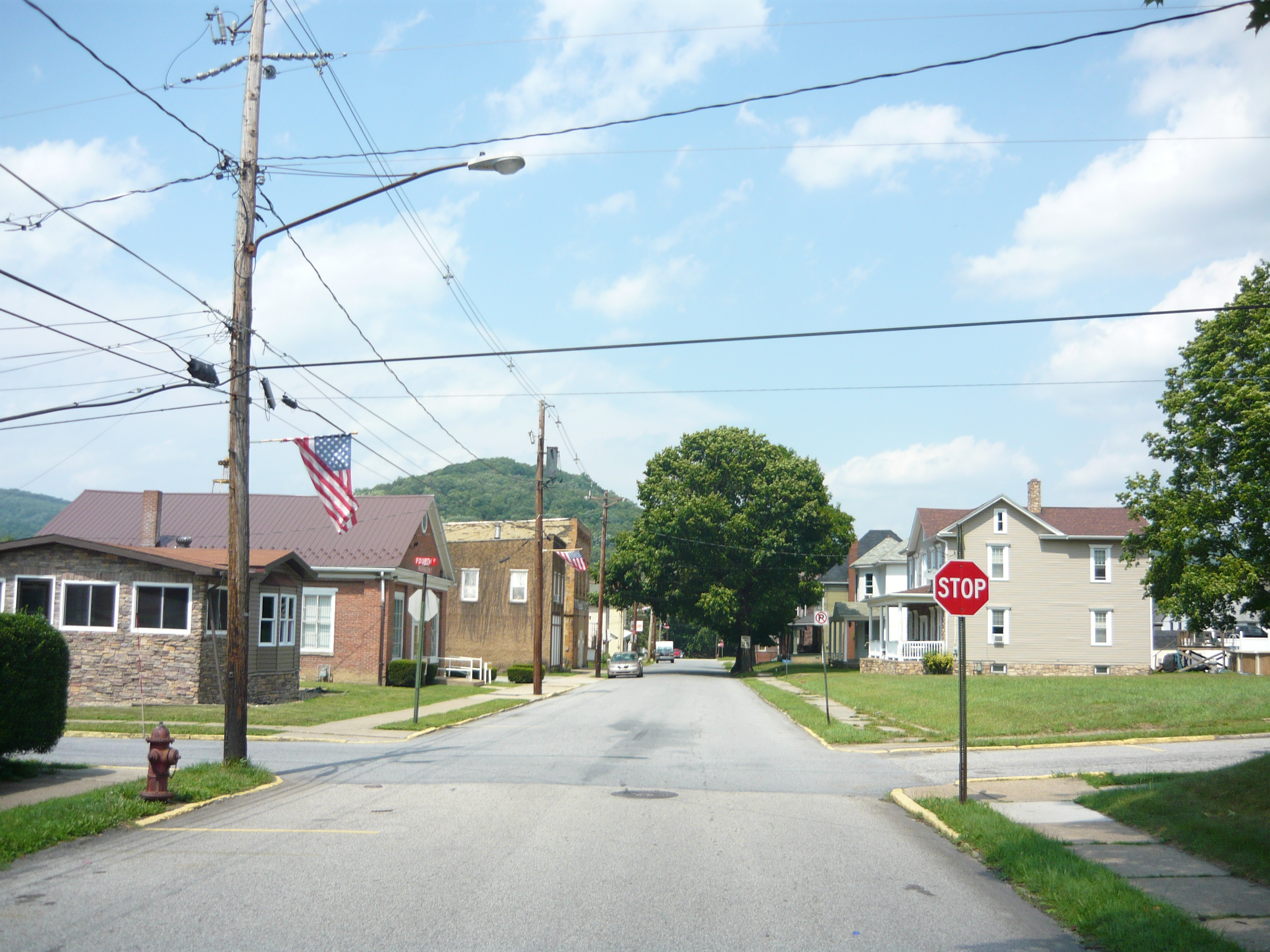
- Washington Street

- Location of Bolivar in Westmoreland County, Pennsylvania.

- Location within Pennsylvania
- Coordinates: 40°23′41″N 79°09′06″W
- Country: United States
- State: Pennsylvania
- County: Westmoreland
- Settled: 1829
- Incorporated: November 25, 1863

Government
  - Type: Borough Council

Area
  - Total: 0.18 sq mi (0.46 km^{2})
  - Land: 0.17 sq mi (0.44 km^{2})
  - Water: 0.0077 sq mi (0.02 km^{2})
- Elevation: 1,099 ft (335 m)

Population (2020)
  - Total: 435
  - Density: 2,551.1/sq mi (984.97/km^{2})
- Time zone: UTC-5 (Eastern (EST))
  - Summer (DST): UTC-4 (EDT)
- Zip code: 15923
- FIPS code: 42-07480
- Website: http://www.bolivarborough.comcastbiz.net/

Bolivar (/ˈbɒlɪvər/, rhymes with "Oliver") is a borough in Westmoreland County, Pennsylvania, United States. The population was 436 at the 2020 census.

== Geography ==
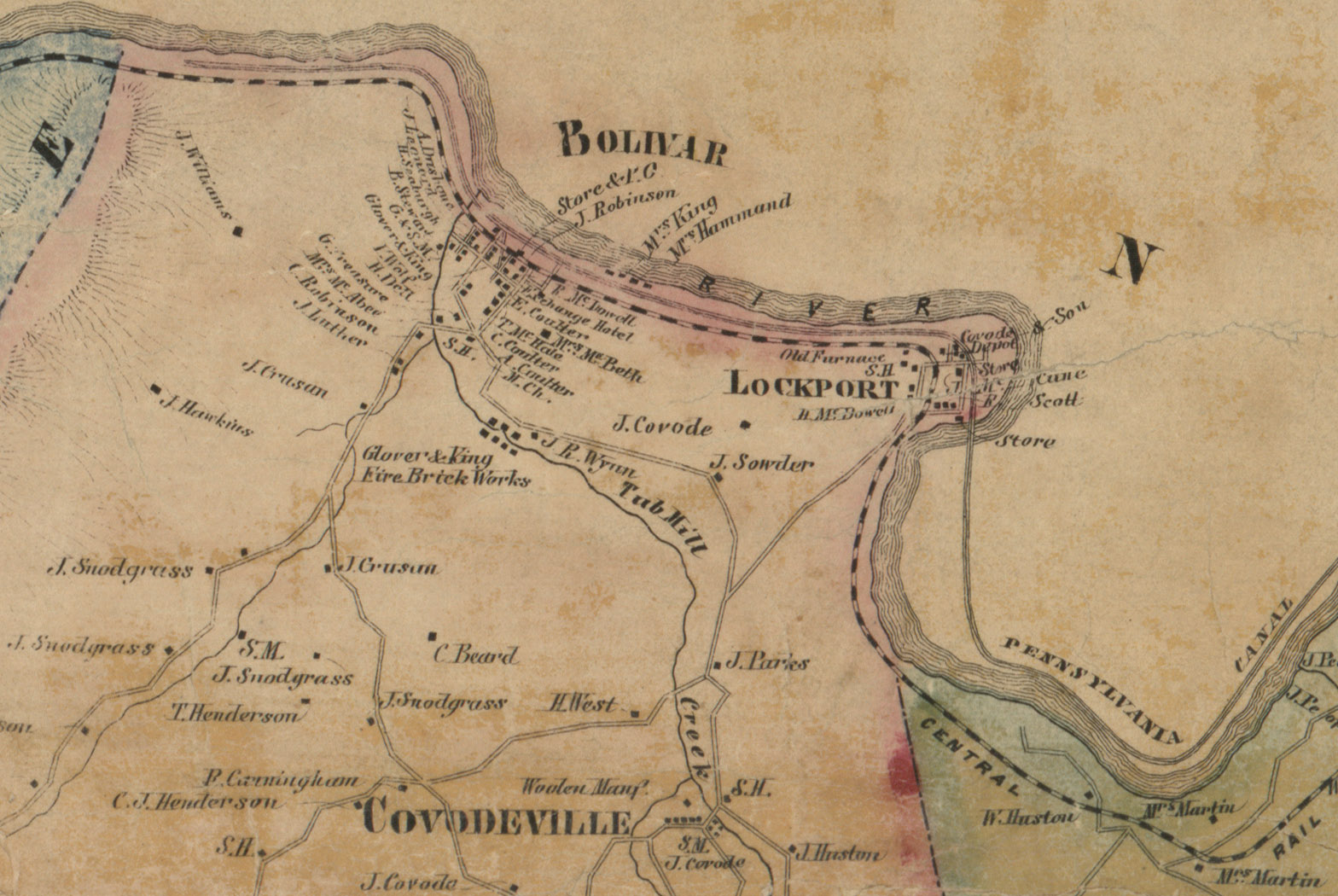
Bolivar & Lockport, Westmoreland County, Pennsylvania, 1857

Bolivar is located at 40°23′41″N 79°9′6″W (40.394788, -79.151616). According to the United States Census Bureau, the borough has a total area of 0.2 square miles (0.52 km^{2}), of which 0.2 square miles (0.52 km^{2}) is land and 5.26% is water. Bolivar is located on the northern border of Fairfield Township, along the Conemaugh River.

== Demographics ==
Historical population
Census	Pop.	Note	%±
1860	40		—
1870	298		645.0%
1880	378		26.8%
1890	410		8.5%
1900	486		18.5%
1910	518		6.6%
1920	766		47.9%
1930	783		2.2%
1940	811		3.6%
1950	828		2.1%
1960	716		−13.5%
1970	668		−6.7%
1980	706		5.7%
1990	544		−22.9%
2000	501		−7.9%
2010	465		−7.2%
2020	435		−6.5%
2021 (est.)	433	▼	−0.5%

As of the census of 2000, there were 501 people, 200 households, and 148 families residing in the borough. The population density was 2,749.9 inhabitants per square mile (1,061.7/km^{2}). There were 220 housing units at an average density of 1,207.6 per square mile (466.3/km^{2}). The racial makeup of the borough was 95.81% White, 0.40% African American, 3.19% Native American, 0.20% Asian, and 0.40% from two or more races.

There were 200 households, out of which 24.5% had children under the age of 18 living with them, 64.0% were married couples living together, 4.5% had a female householder with no husband present, and 26.0% were non-families. 24.5% of all households were made up of individuals, and 16.5% had someone living alone who was 65 years of age or older. The average household size was 2.45 and the average family size was 2.85.

In the borough the population was spread out, with 18.2% under the age of 18, 9.0% from 18 to 24, 22.6% from 25 to 44, 30.1% from 45 to 64, and 20.2% who were 65 years of age or older. The median age was 45 years. For every 100 females, there were 92.7 males. For every 100 females age 18 and over, there were 94.3 males.

The median income for a household in the borough was $30,268, and the median income for a family was $35,682. Males had a median income of $25,341 versus $13,438 for females. The per capita income for the borough was $13,551. About 4.2% of families and 11.7% of the population were below the poverty line, including 26.5% of those under age 18 and 5.9% of those age 65 or over.

== History ==
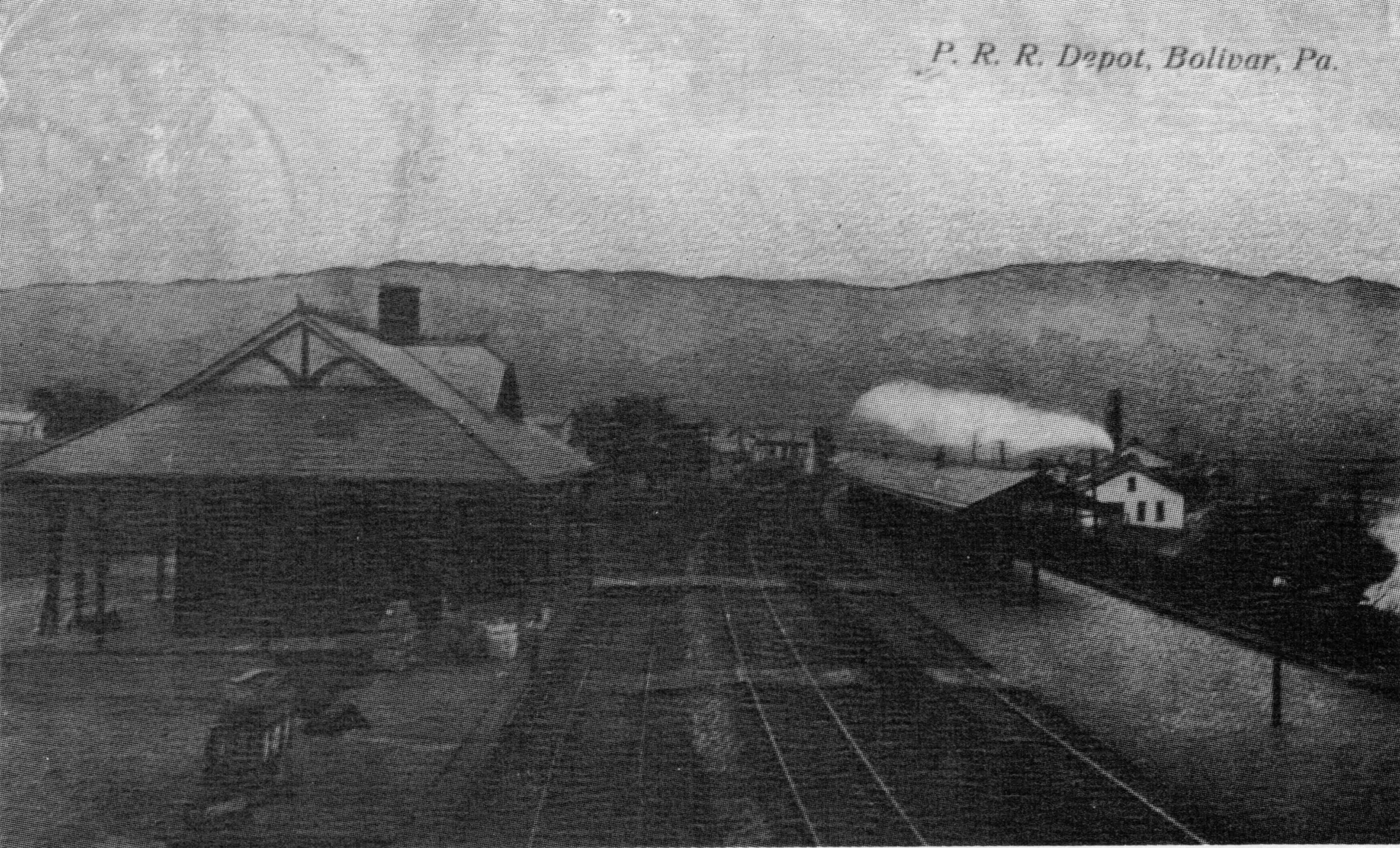
The old rail depot

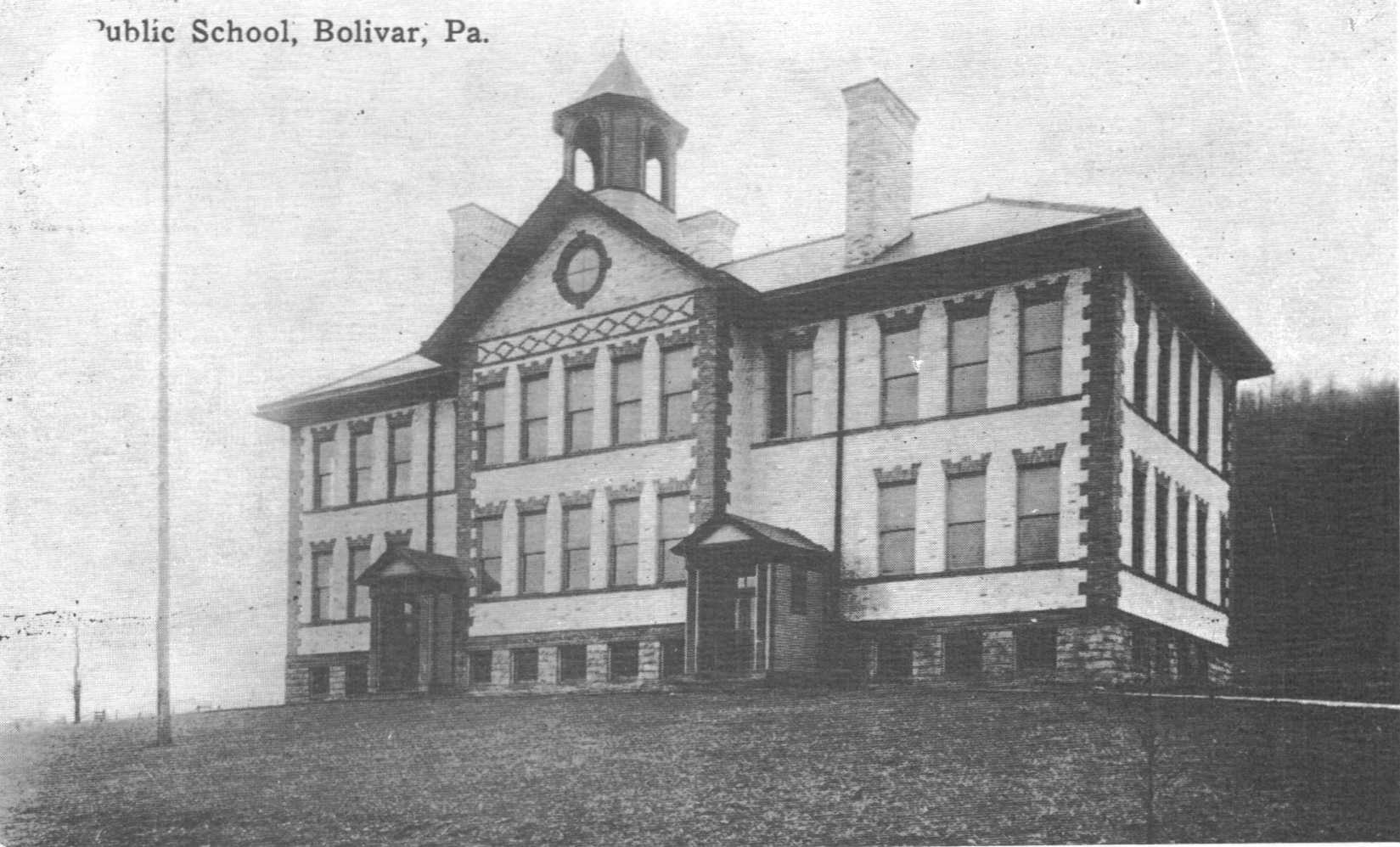
Bolivar Public School - 1904.

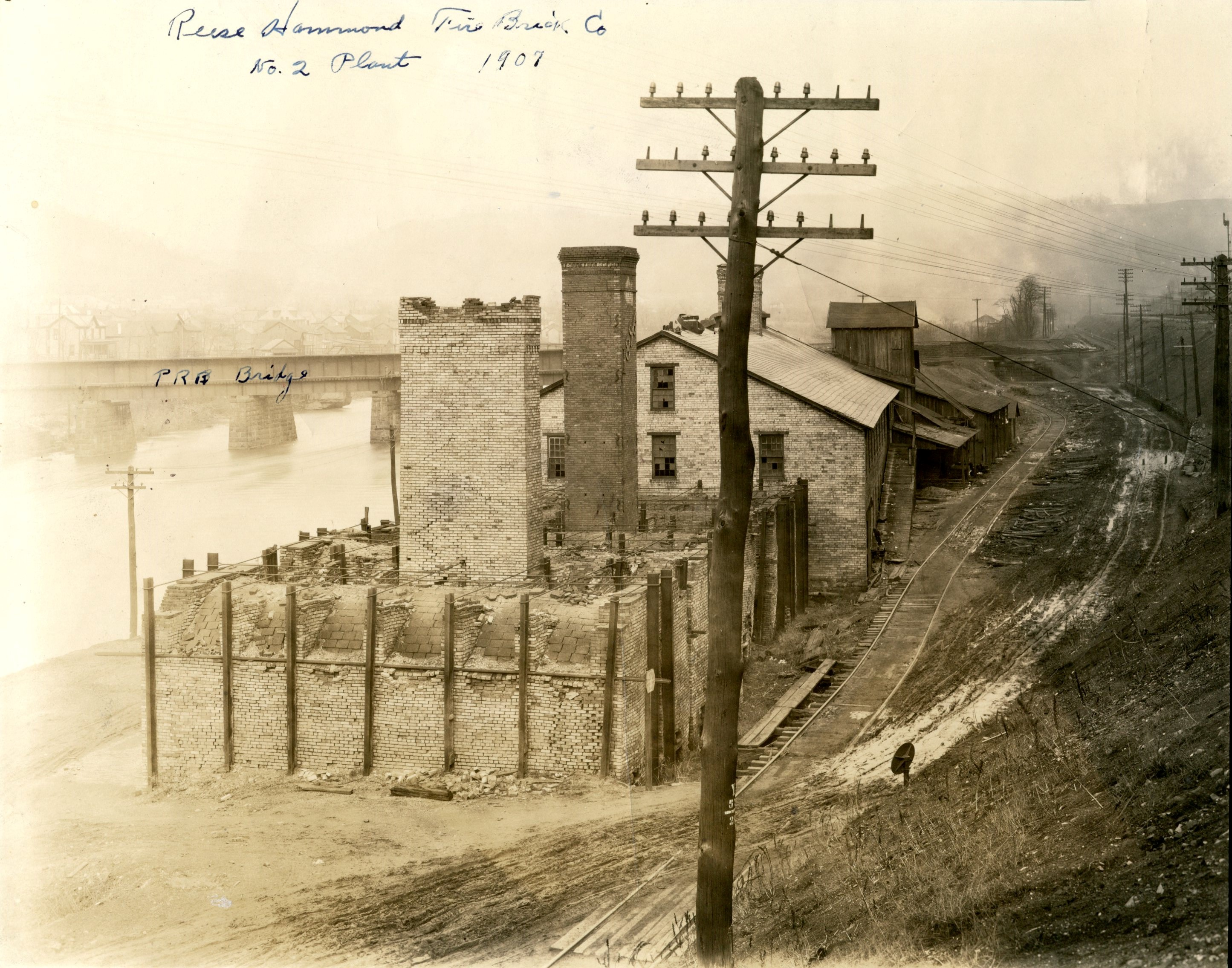
Reese Hammond Fire Brick Co, Plant No.2 Bolivar, PA 1907

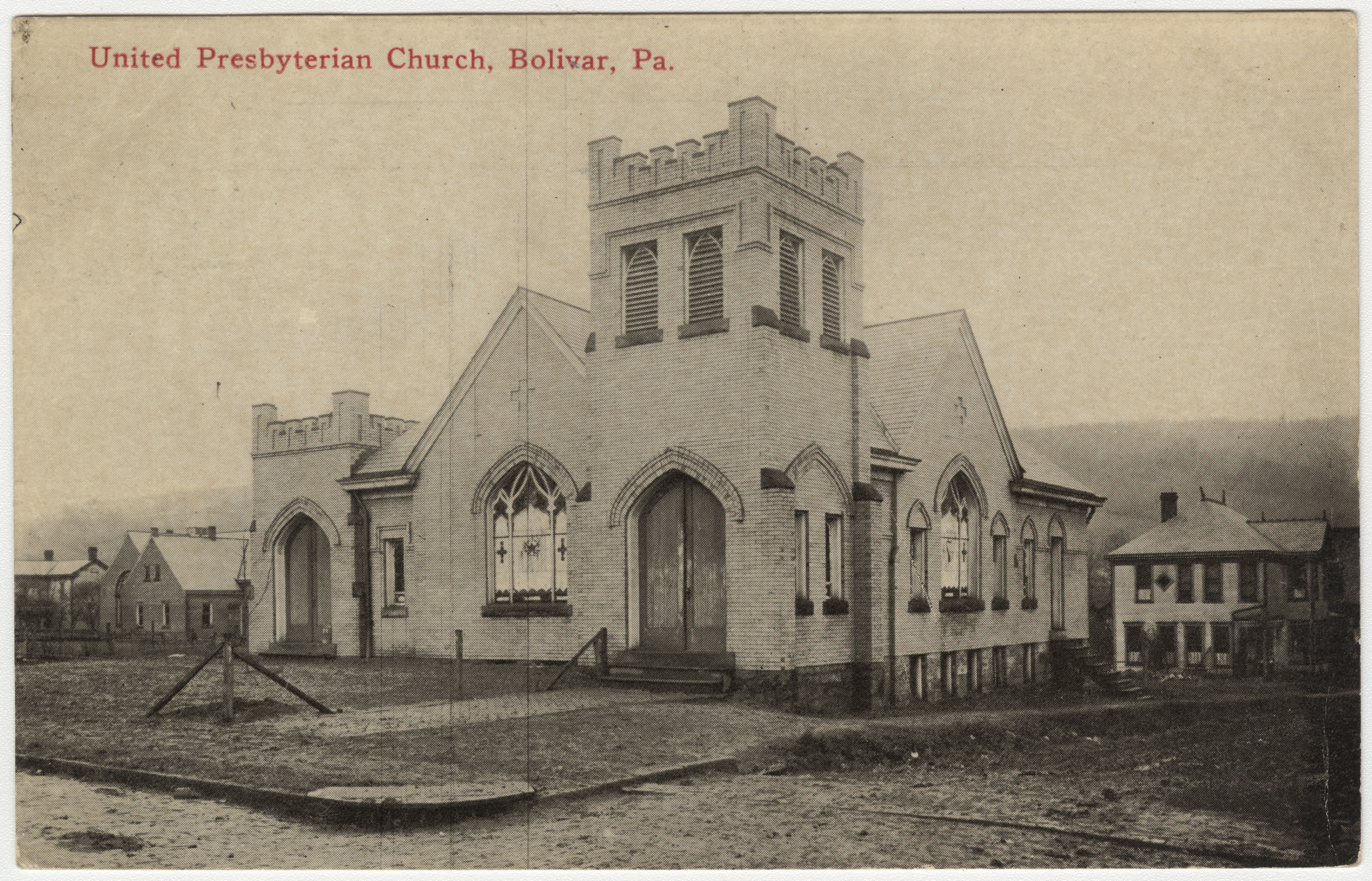
The United Presbyterian Church from a pre-1923 postcard

The first settlers arrived in Bolivar about the year 1829 and settled between Tubmill Creek and the Conemaugh River. Most of the men were employed by the Pennsylvania Canal. The canal was located on the south side of the Conemaugh River. Some of the locks still may be seen west of town.

Several small brickyards were started in the area, producing a red brick. Some of the houses on Second Street were constructed of these brick. They are still well-preserved today after exposure to the elements for over a century.

The Pennsylvania Railroad replaced the canal in 1846. Brickyards No. 1, and No. 2, and No. 3 were constructed between the Conemaugh River and the railroad. Bolivar was beginning to grow and prosper and was known as a "Brick Town". In 1863 Bolivar withdrew from Fairfield Township and became a borough, under the grounds that it was designed like many other boroughs of the time, in a checkerboard pattern. Bolivar borough was incorporated November 25, 1863.

The north side of the Conemaugh was a very desirable location for new construction of brickyards due to the completion of the Western Pennsylvania Railroad from Blairsville to Bolivar, and the close proximity to coal and clay. No. 4 Brickyard at the time of its first operation was the largest brickyard in the North American continent, having a capacity of 100,000 paving blocks each day. The Robinson Brothers also constructed a brickyard, and it is the only one in existence at the present time, being known as Garfield Refractories Co. The Enamel Works started in 1899 with a large government contract. The Bolivar School was constructed of brick made from the Enamel Works.

J. B. Hammond got control of the five brickyards in Bolivar and several in Clearfield County just before the start of the 20th century, and a rapid expansion took place. This might be called "The Golden Era of Bolivar." A large hotel was started near the station and a large department store was planned for Washington and Second Streets. Pipes were laid under the streets for central heating, but the dream was never realized. A panic took place in 1902, the bank failed (the depositors were paid in full later) and the brickyards were forced into receivership.

From 1914 through the 1920s, Bolivar enjoyed its second boom period. Soissons and General Refractories took over the brickyards and the Lacolle Mine and Ridgeview Coal Mines were opened, and shipped large quantities of coal. Mining, lumbering and manufacturing employed many persons. The Lincoln Brickyard enjoyed a brief period of prosperity under the leadership of Lorenzo Mumford. He was a leader, designer of bricks, and salesman, and kept the yard going for many months. He sold a million bricks to the Chase National Bank in New York for construction of one of its banks.

Bolivar was hit hard by the Great Depression of the 1930s. The following losses during the depression and the years ensuing have not been replaced in many instances. Bolivar has lost six brickyards, two large coal companies, restaurants, flour and feed mill, railroad station, express station, two banks, lumber yard, opera house, movie house, dentist office, The Bolivar News, Cornet Band, swimming pool, bakery, jewelry store, furniture store.

The Antiochian Village was established in 1978. The Ligonier Meeting of American bishops took place there in 1994.
