= Fairfield Township, Westmoreland County, Pennsylvania =

Township in Pennsylvania, US

Coordinates: 40°23′00″N 79°07′59″W

- Township
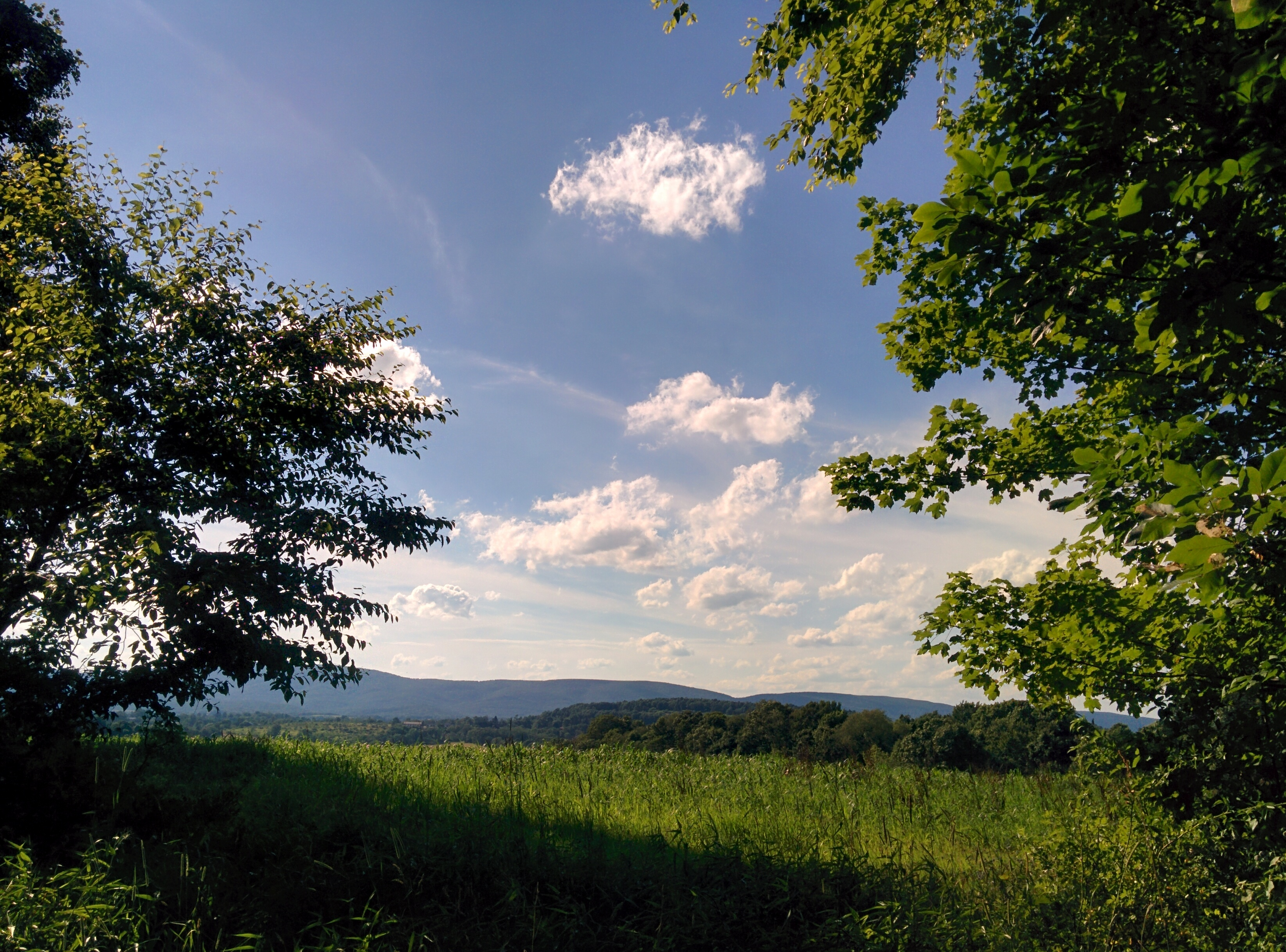
- A view from Fairfield Township with Chestnut Ridge in the distance

- Logo

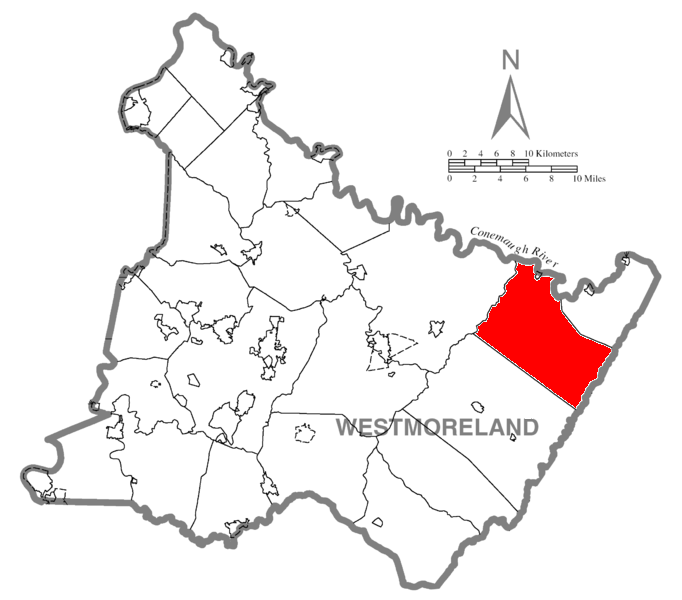
- Map of Westmoreland County, Pennsylvania Highlighting Fairfield Township

- Map of Pennsylvania highlighting Westmoreland County
- Country: United States
- State: Pennsylvania
- County: Westmoreland
- Settled: 1769
- Incorporated: April 6, 1773

Area
  - Total: 61.59 sq mi (159.52 km^{2})
  - Land: 61.37 sq mi (158.96 km^{2})
  - Water: 0.22 sq mi (0.56 km^{2})

Population (2020)
  - Total: 2,051 ▼
  - Estimate (2021): 2,042
  - Density: 38.8/sq mi (14.98/km^{2})
- Time zone: UTC-5 (Eastern (EST))
  - Summer (DST): UTC-4 (EDT)
- FIPS code: 42-129-24608
- Website: fairfieldtwp.com

Fairfield Township is a township in Westmoreland County, Pennsylvania, United States. The population was 2,051 at the 2020 census.

== History ==
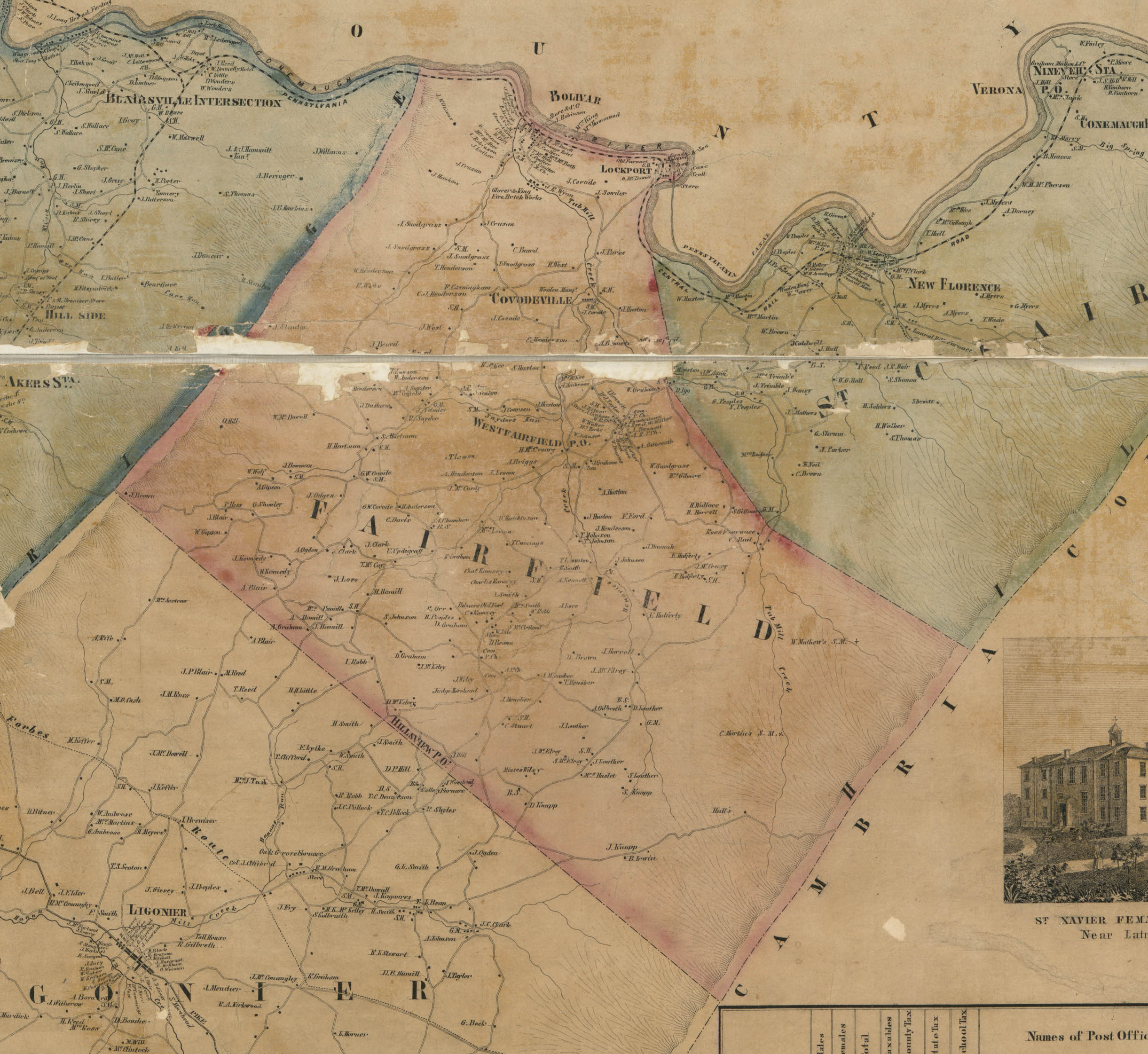
Fairfield Township, Westmoreland County, Pennsylvania, 1857

The Ross Furnace was listed on the National Register of Historic Places in 1991.

Located near the Conemaugh River, The Lockport Furnace was located in the former village of Lockport, which was destroyed in a 1936 major flood.

== Geography ==
According to the United States Census Bureau, the township has a total area of 60.8 square miles (157 km^{2}), of which 60.5 square miles (157 km^{2}) is land and 0.3 square miles (0.78 km^{2}) (0.48%) is water. The township is bordered by Ligonier Township to the southwest, Derry Township to the northwest, Indiana County to the north, St. Clair Township to the northeast, and Cambria County to the southeast. The borough of Bolivar is located on the northern border of Fairfield Township, along the Conemaugh River.

== Demographics ==
Historical population
Census	Pop.	Note	%±
2000	2,536		—
2010	2,424		−4.4%
2020	2,051		−15.4%
2021 (est.)	2,042		−0.4%
U.S. Decennial Census

At the 2000 census there were 2,536 people, 950 households, and 737 families living in the township. The population density was 41.9 inhabitants per square mile (16.2/km^{2}). There were 1,141 housing units at an average density of 18.9 units per square mile (7.3 units/km^{2}). The racial makeup of the township was 98.74% White, 0.39% African American, 0.28% Native American, 0.04% Asian, 0.08% from other races, and 0.47% from two or more races. Hispanic or Latino of any race were 0.43%.

Of the 950 households 31.2% had children under the age of 18 living with them, 65.9% were married couples living together, 8.3% had a female householder with no husband present, and 22.4% were non-families. 19.5% of households were one person and 10.2% were one person aged 65 or older. The average household size was 2.61 and the average family size was 2.97.

The age distribution was 24.6% under the age of 18, 6.5% from 18 to 24, 29.1% from 25 to 44, 26.1% from 45 to 64, and 13.8% 65 or older. The median age was 39 years. For every 100 females, there were 103.9 males. For every 100 females age 18 and over, there were 98.0 males.

The median household income was $32,927 and the median family income was $37,177. Males had a median income of $37,422 versus $23,750 for females. The per capita income for the township was $18,284. About 12.1% of families and 15.5% of the population were below the poverty line, including 23.5% of those under age 18 and 9.2% of those age 65 or over.
