= Laurel Mountain, Pennsylvania =

Borough in Pennsylvania, US

- Borough
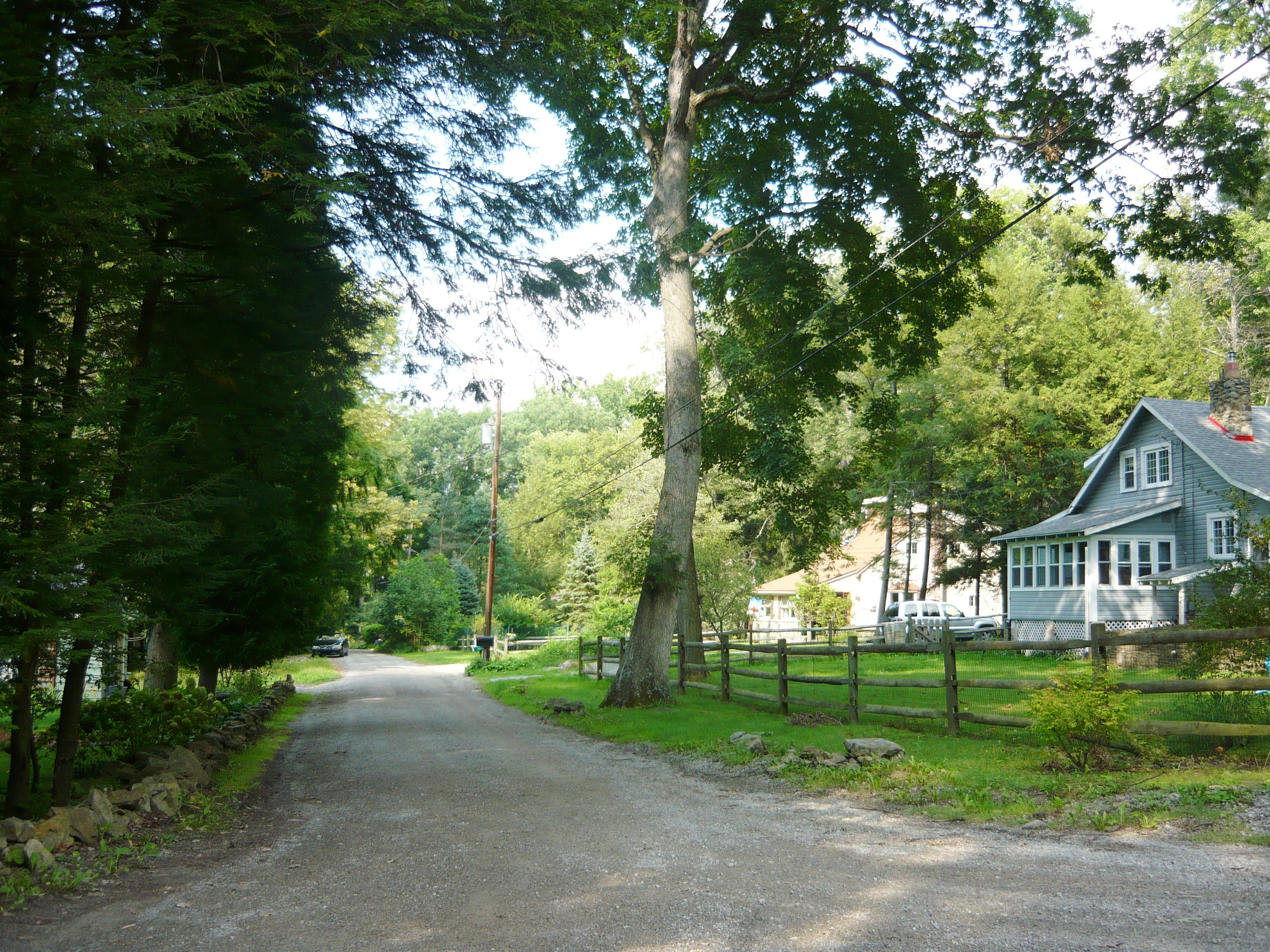
- Locust Street

- Location of Laurel Mountain in Westmoreland County, Pennsylvania.

- Location within Pennsylvania
- Coordinates: 40°12′41″N 79°11′04″W
- Country: United States
- State: Pennsylvania
- County: Westmoreland
- Settled: 1926
- Incorporated: 1982

Government
  - Type: Borough Council

Area
  - Total: 0.13 sq mi (0.33 km^{2})
  - Land: 0.13 sq mi (0.33 km^{2})
  - Water: 0 sq mi (0.00 km^{2})
- Elevation: 1,421 ft (433 m)

Population (2020)
  - Total: 146
  - Density: 1,131.3/sq mi (436.81/km^{2})
- Time zone: UTC-5 (Eastern (EST))
  - Summer (DST): UTC-4 (EDT)
- Zip code: 15655
- FIPS code: 42-41834
- Website: Official borough website

Laurel Mountain is a borough that is located in Westmoreland County, Pennsylvania, United States. As of the 2020 census, Laurel Mountain had a population of 146.

Situated at the foot of Laurel Mountain (elev. 2,800 ft.), the borough lies near numerous limestone caves and is surrounded by venues for skiing, hiking, and other outdoor activities.

== History ==
On July 28, 1769, Richard and Thomas Penn obtained the land where the community of Laurel Mountain would ultimately be located. Purchased from members of the Iroquois Confederacy as part of a larger acquisition encompassing a major portion of what is, today, southwestern Pennsylvania, the price was ten thousand dollars.

During the early nineteenth century, Alexander Johnson obtained a patent from the Commonwealth of Pennsylvania, which transferred ownership to him in 1815 of a 724-acre portion of this same area, including the section that would later become Laurel Mountain. Roughly three decades later, on May 27, 1843, Joseph Naugle purchased 283 acres of the 724-acre segment, and built a home there, paving the way for the creation of a new community.

By the early 1900s, that community had become a place of retreat for business and civic leaders seeking summer vacation homes outside of the city of Pittsburgh. On September 1, 1944, Laurel Mountain Park, Inc. was chartered and empowered to oversee operation of the growing community's recreational facilities.

On December 21, 1979, the Westmoreland Court of Common Pleas approved the incorporation of Laurel Mountain as a borough. The first borough council was subsequently established in January 1982.

== Geography ==
Laurel Mountain is located at 40°12′41″N 79°11′4″W (40.211418, -79.184568). According to the United States Census Bureau, the borough has a total area of 0.1 square miles (0.26 km^{2}), all land.

It is situated in the southern part of Ligonier Township.

== Demographics ==
Historical population
Census	Pop.	Note	%±
1990	195		—
2000	185		−5.1%
2010	167		−9.7%
2020	146		−12.6%

At the time of the 2000 census there were 185 people, 78 households, and 56 families living in the borough.

The population density was 1,347.4 inhabitants per square mile (520.2/km^{2}). There were 109 housing units at an average density of 793.9 per square mile (306.5/km^{2}).

The racial makeup of the borough was 100.00% White. Hispanic or Latino of any race were 1.62%.

Of the 78 households 26.9% had children under the age of eighteen living with them; 61.5% were married couples living together, 6.4% had a female householder with no husband present, and 28.2% were non-families. 24.4% of residences were one-person households and 11.5% were households with one person residing there who was aged sixty-five or older.

The average household size was 2.37 and the average family size was 2.80.

The age distribution was 19.5% under the age of eighteen, 5.9% from eighteen to twenty-four, 27.0% from twenty-five to forty-four, 25.4% from forty-five to sixty-four, and 22.2% who were aged sixty-five or older. The median age was forty-four years.

For every one hundred females, there were 96.8 males. For every one hundred females who were aged eighteen or older, there were 96.1 males.

The median household income was $44,750 and the median family income was $63,125. Males had a median income of $51,250 compared with that of $30,833 for females.

The per capita income for the borough was $21,564.

Approximately 13.2% of families and 20.0% of the population were living below the poverty line, including 36.4% of those who were under the age of eighteen and 6.5% of those who were sixty-five or older.
