= Seward, Pennsylvania =

Borough in Pennsylvania, US

- Borough
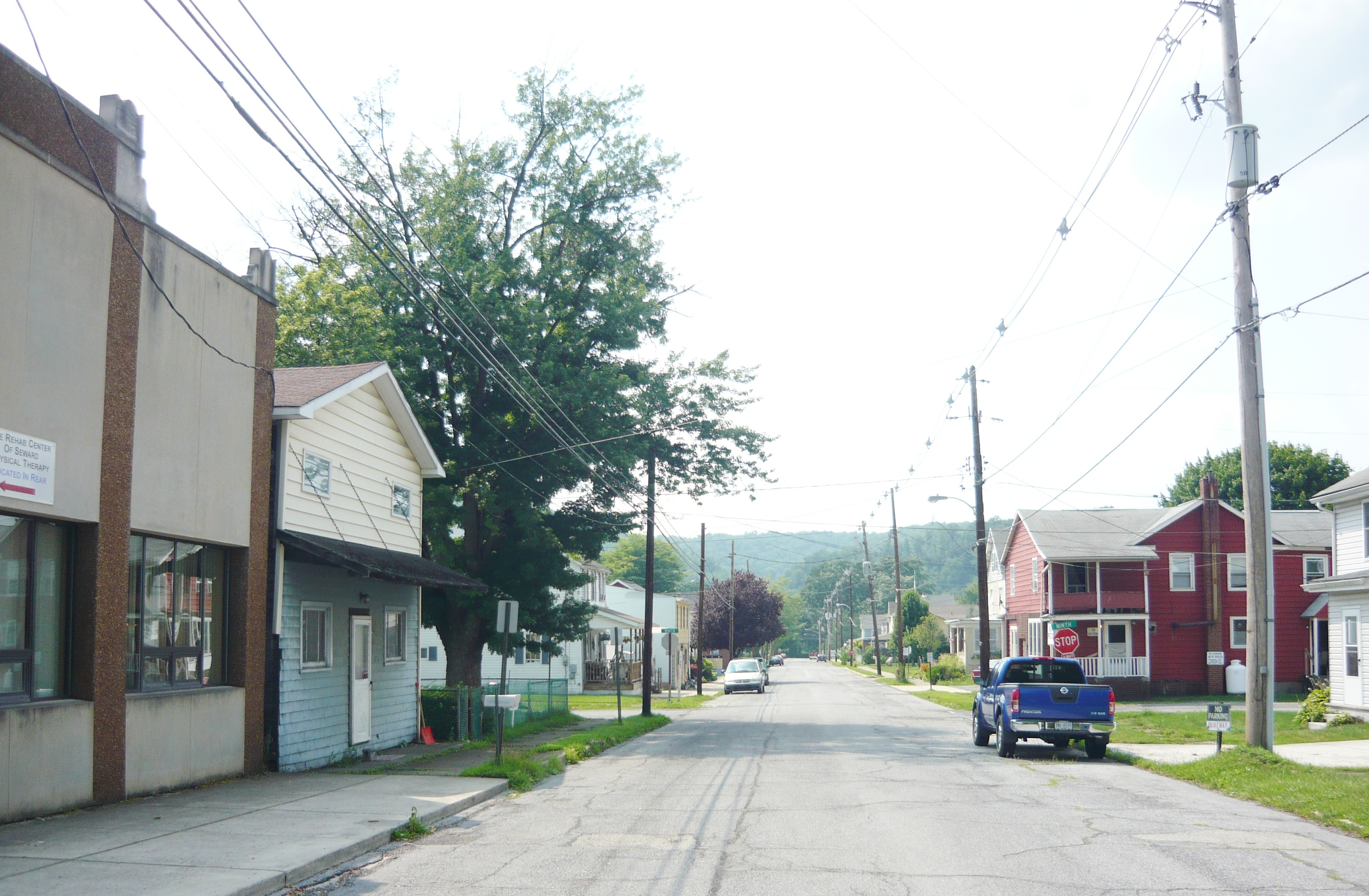
- Indiana Street

- Location of Seward in Westmoreland County, Pennsylvania.

- Location within Pennsylvania
- Coordinates: 40°24′53″N 79°01′22″W
- Country: United States
- State: Pennsylvania
- County: Westmoreland
- Incorporated: January 23, 1904

Government
  - Type: Borough Council

Area
  - Total: 0.20 sq mi (0.52 km^{2})
  - Land: 0.20 sq mi (0.52 km^{2})
  - Water: 0 sq mi (0.00 km^{2})
- Elevation: 1,135 ft (346 m)

Population (2010)
  - Total: 495
  - Estimate (2019): 462
  - Density: 2,286.4/sq mi (882.78/km^{2})
- Time zone: UTC-5 (Eastern (EST))
  - Summer (DST): UTC-4 (EDT)
- Zip code: 15954
- Area codes: 724, 814
- FIPS code: 42-69368

Seward is a borough in Westmoreland County, Pennsylvania, United States. As of the 2020 census, Seward had a population of 411.

It is also one of three communities within the county to utilize the 814 area code, along with St. Clair and New Florence.

== History ==
In June 1902, three men were killed instantly, two were fatally hurt and five others were injured, including one man who later died, following an explosion at the Cambria powder plant's coining mill in Seward. According to news coverage, "The explosion occurred as the men were loading a pot of powder on a wagon driven by" one of the victims, thirty-eight-year-old John Rhoads, who reportedly left a large family. The others who were killed were: Seward resident J. B. Smith, aged forty, who was also the head of a large family; Charles Drover, a thirty-five-year-old, unmarried resident of Wapwallopen in Luzerne County, Pennsylvania; and Seward resident W. F. Bracken, who was married with three children.

A second, similar explosion then occurred in Seward at the Conemaugh Powder Works on December 7, 1903, killing worker Alfred Beatty and seriously injuring four other men.

On January 4, 1908, Seward resident Patrick Kerwin, who was reportedly the oldest person alive in Pennsylvania at that time, died at the age of one hundred and eleven. A native of Ireland, he had been born on St. Patrick's Day in 1796.

== Geography ==
Seward is located at 40°24′53″N 79°1′22″W (40.414759, -79.022856).

According to the United States Census Bureau, the borough has a total area of 0.2 square miles (0.52 km^{2}), all land.

Seward is entirely surrounded by St. Clair Township

The community was impacted by the Johnstown flood of 1977; seven people died as a result of the disaster.

== Demographics ==
Historical population
Census	Pop.	Note	%±
1910	548		—
1920	657		19.9%
1930	742		12.9%
1940	845		13.9%
1950	852		0.8%
1960	754		−11.5%
1970	746		−1.1%
1980	675		−9.5%
1990	522		−22.7%
2000	484		−7.3%
2010	495		2.3%
2020	411		−17.0%

At the 2000 census there were four hundred and eight-four people, one hundred and ninety-nine households and one hundred and twenty-nine families living in the borough.

The population density was 2,255.1 inhabitants per square mile (870.7/km^{2}). There were two hundred and twenty-six housing units at an average density of 1,053.0 units per square mile (406.6 units/km^{2}).

The racial makeup of the borough was 99.17% White, 0.21% African American, and 0.62% from two or more races. Hispanic or Latino of any race were 0.21%.

Of the one hundred and ninety-nine households 22.6% had children under the age of eighteen living with them, 54.8% were married couples living together, 7.5% had a female householder with no husband present, and 34.7% were non-families. 30.7% of households were one person and 19.1% were one person aged sixty-five or older. The average household size was 2.36 and the average family size was 2.91.

The age distribution was 20.5% under the age of eighteen, 5.8% from eighteen to twenty-four, 26.7% from twenty-five to forty-four, 25.8% from forty-five to sixty-four, and 21.3% who were aged sixty-five or older. The median age was forty-three years.

For every one hundred females, there were 94.4 males. For every one hundred females aged eighteen and over, there were 94.4 males.

The median household income was $29,583 and the median family income was $38,500. Males had a median income of $32,083 compared with $18,333 for females. The per capita income for the borough was $14,585.

Roughly 4.9% of families and 12.2% of the population were below the poverty line, including 15.7% of those under the age of eighteen and 21.6% of those aged sixty-five or over.
