= St. Clair Township, Pennsylvania =

Township in Pennsylvania, US

Coordinates: 40.3628°N 79.0339°W

- Township
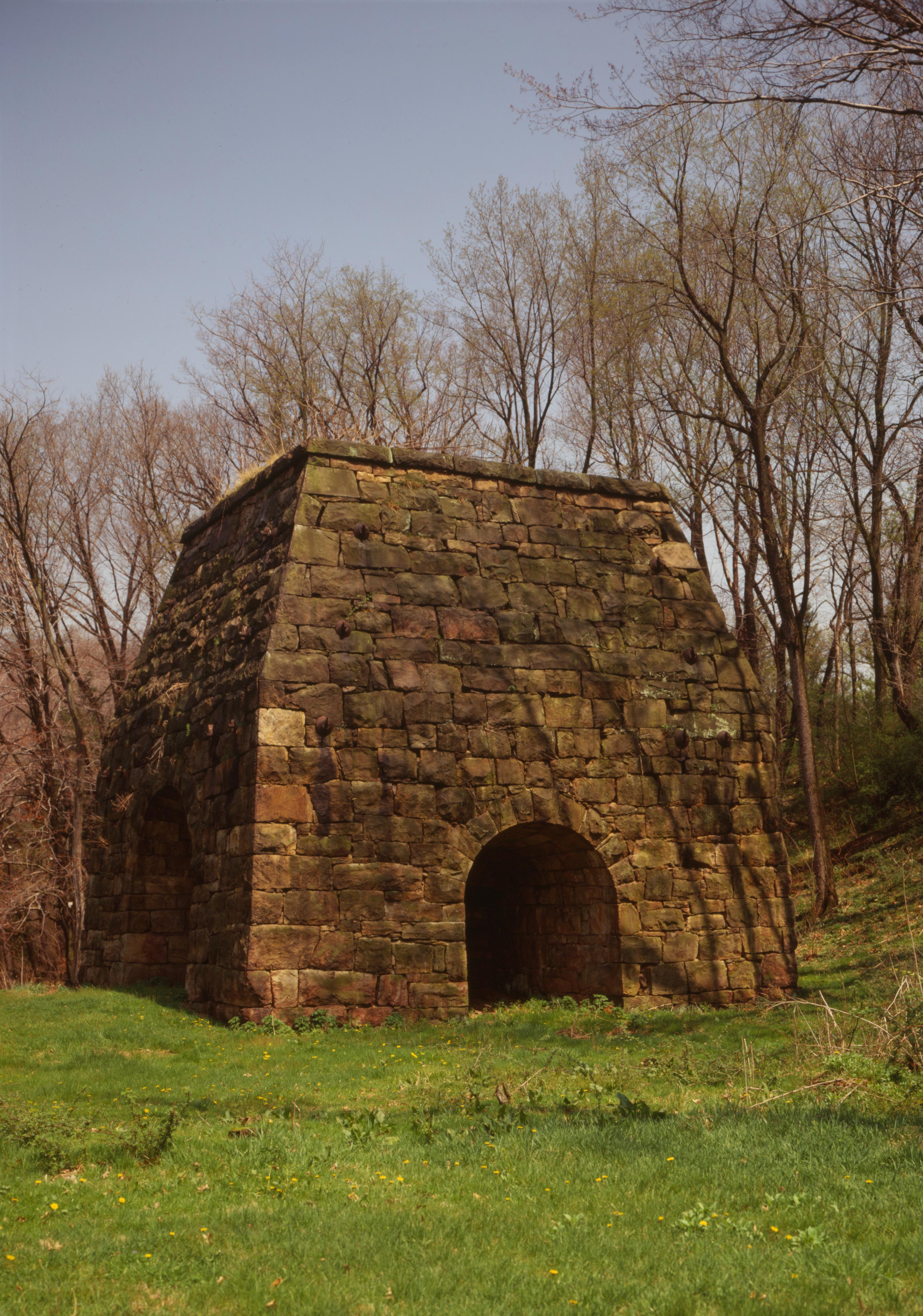
- The Laurel Hill Furnace, a historic landmark in St. Clair Township

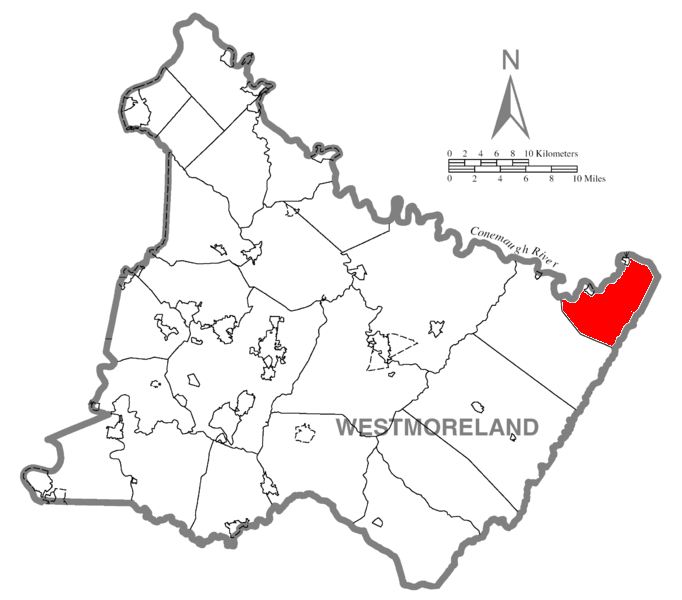
- Map of Westmoreland County, Pennsylvania Highlighting St. Clair Township

- Map of Pennsylvania highlighting Westmoreland County
- Country: United States
- State: Pennsylvania
- County: Westmoreland
- Settled: 1776
- Incorporated: 1856

Area
  - Total: 28.41 sq mi (73.58 km^{2})
  - Land: 28.14 sq mi (72.88 km^{2})
  - Water: 0.27 sq mi (0.71 km^{2})

Population (2020)
  - Total: 1,339 ▼
  - Estimate (2021): 1,328
  - Density: 51.9/sq mi (20.02/km^{2})
- Time zone: UTC-5 (Eastern (EST))
  - Summer (DST): UTC-4 (EDT)
- Area codes: 724, 814
- FIPS code: 42-129-67240

St. Clair Township is a township in Westmoreland County, Pennsylvania, United States. The population was 1,339 at the 2020 census. It is also one of three communities within the county to utilise the 814 area code, alongside New Florence and Seward.

== History ==
The Squirrel Hill Site, an archaeological site and the location of a former Monongahela village, is located in St. Clair Township near the borough of New Florence. It is listed on the National Register of Historic Places along with the Laurel Hill Furnace.

== Geography ==
According to the United States Census Bureau, the township has a total area of 28.7 square miles (74.4 km^{2}), of which 28.4 square miles (73.5 km^{2}) is land and 0.4 square mile (1.0 km^{2}) (1.32%) is water.

== Demographics ==
Historical population
Census	Pop.	Note	%±
2000	1,398		—
2010	1,518		8.6%
2020	1,339		−11.8%
2021 (est.)	1,328		−0.8%
U.S. Decennial Census

As of the 2010 census, there were 1,518 people living in St. Clair township, in 634 households (including 446 families). The average household size was 2.39 people. In the census, 98.4 percent of the population identified as white, with 0.5 percent Asian, 0.3 percent African American or black, and 0.2 percent Alaskan or Native American. The remainder identified as multiracial or some other race. 1 percent identified as Latino or Hispanic.

Previously, in the census of 2000, there were 1,398 people, 568 households, and 408 families living in the township. The population density was 49.3 inhabitants per square mile (19.0/km^{2}). There were 665 housing units at an average density of 23.5/sq mi (9.1/km^{2}). The racial makeup of the township was 98.43% White, 0.57% from other races, and 1.00% from two or more races. Hispanic or Latino of any race were 1.07% of the population. The median age was 44.4 years for males and 44.5 years for females.

There were 568 households, out of which 27.8% had children under the age of 18 living with them, 60.4% were married couples living together, 7.7% had a female householder with no husband present, and 28.0% were non-families. 25.4% of all households were made up of individuals, and 12.9% had someone living alone who was 65 years of age or older. The average household size was 2.46 and the average family size was 2.92.

In the township the population was spread out, with 22.0% under the age of 18, 5.7% from 18 to 24, 28.8% from 25 to 44, 25.4% from 45 to 64, and 18.0% who were 65 years of age or older. The median age was 41 years. For every 100 females, there were 98.6 males. For every 100 females age 18 and over, there were 99.6 males.

The median income for a household in the township was $29,000, and the median income for a family was $34,375. Males had a median income of $28,750 versus $20,694 for females. The per capita income for the township was $14,611. About 9.6% of families and 12.3% of the population were below the poverty line, including 18.1% of those under age 18 and 8.4% of those age 65 or over.
