= Somerset County Technology Center =

Coordinates: 40.002704°N 79.033337°W

Location
- 281 Technology Drive; Somerset Township, Somerset County, Pennsylvania; Somerset, Pennsylvania 15501

Information
- School type: Public Vocational-Technical School
- Opened: 1972
- NCES School ID: 428040007085
- Administrative Director: Karen Remick
- Faculty: 18
- Employees: 25
- Grades: 10-12
- Schedule type: Part-Time
- Accreditation: Middle States Association - Commission on Secondary Schools
- Website: www.sctc.net

Somerset County Technology Center (SCTC) is a public vocational-technical school just outside Somerset, Pennsylvania. SCTC has eight sending high schools, in which students attend the center for one-half of the day and their home school for the other one half. It also offers adult education opportunities, both on- and off-site, to county residents.

== High School Opportunities ==
Presently, SCTC has eight sending school districts, which sends Sophomores, Juniors and Seniors from their respective High Schools to the center for one-half day to participate in career workshops. Cooperative Education is also available

=== Sending School Districts/High Schools ===
School district	High School
Berlin Brothersvalley	Berlin Brothersvalley
Meyersdale Area	Meyersdale Area
North Star	North Star
Rockwood Area	Rockwood Area
Shade-Central City	Shade
Shanksville-Stonycreek	Shanksville-Stonycreek
Somerset Area	Somerset Area
Turkeyfoot Valley Area	Turkeyfoot Valley Area

=== High School Programs ===
There are fifteen career programs for the High School Students, including:

- Auto Body Technology
- Auto Technology
- Carpentry
- Computer Networking
- Cosmetology
- Culinary Arts
- Dental Assisting
- Early Childhood Education
- Electrical Occupations
- Forestry
- Health Occupations
- Machine Technology
- Masonry
- Pre-Engineering Drafting & Design
- Welding

=== High school clubs and organizations ===
Students may belong to the following clubs or organizations while attending SCCTC

- SkillsUSA
- FFA
- National Association of Home Builders - Student Chapter
- SADD
- BotsIQ of Southwestern Pennsylvania

== Adult Education ==
Adult education opportunities abound at SCTC, which include: Distance Learning, Intergenerational Learning, Short-Term Programs and Adult Literacy

== Customized Training ==
SCTC offers agencies and businesses in the community work-related training to maintain a trained workforce, either on or off site.
