= Jenners, Pennsylvania =

Unincorporated community in Pennsylvania, US

Coordinates: 40°08′35″N 79°02′34″W

Jenners is an unincorporated community in Jenner Township, Somerset County, Pennsylvania, United States. It is part of the Johnstown, Pennsylvania Metropolitan Statistical Area. Other nearby unincorporated communities within Jenner Township include Jenner Crossroad, Ferrellton, Acosta, Gray and Ralphton. Also nearby but with separate municipal governments are the boroughs of Jennerstown and Boswell. Jenners is also part of the North Star School District. The Jenners area code is: 814; the zip code: 15546.

== History ==
Jenners was built in 1907 as a company town, by the Consolidation Coal Company, an interest of the Rockefeller Family of New York, to house workers of its Mine No. 118. Jenners was named after its township, Jenner Township, Pennsylvania (where a brief history of the area is found on its wiki page).

== Notable person ==
Joseph Darby, who in April 2004 the Pentagon credited as the lone soldier who came forward to halt and expose the Abu Ghraib prisoner-of-war abuse scandal in Baghdad, Iraq, is a native of Jenners and a graduate of nearby North Star High School. Darby received the 2005 Profile in Courage Award from the John F. Kennedy Foundation for his actions. Darby's actions sparked controversy locally; Darby's family felt that the community turned against him for being the whistleblower about Abu Ghraib.
