= North Star High School =

Coordinates: 40.15914°N 79.02941°W

Location
- 400 Ohio Street; Boswell, Pennsylvania 15531

Information
- School type: Public High School
- School district: North Star School District
- NCES District ID: 4210115
- Superintendent: Thad Kiesnowski
- NCES School ID: 421011503988
- Principal: Louis Lepley
- Teaching staff: 26.90 (FTE)
- Grades: 8-12
- Enrollment: 328 (2023-2024)
- Student to teacher ratio: 12.19
- Colors: Green and White
- Athletics conference: PIAA District V
- Team name: Cougars
- Newspaper: Cougar Paw Print
- Communities served: Boswell, Hooversville, Jennerstown, Stoystown
- Feeder schools: North Star East Middle School
- Alumni: Joseph Darby
- Website: North Star High School

North Star High School is a public High School, located in northern Somerset County, and is named after the former North Star Way (now Flight 93 Memorial Highway) that travels through the district. North Star is a merger of the Jenner-Boswell and Forbes School District in 1969.

== Vocational Education ==
Students in grades 10–12, who wish to pursue training in a specific career path or field may attend the Somerset County Technology Center in Somerset Township.

== Athletics ==
North Star participates in PIAA District V:

- Baseball - Class AA
- Basketball - Class AAA
- Football - Class AA
- Golf - Class AAAA
- Rifle - Class AAAA
- Soccer - Class A/AA
- Softball - Class AA
- Volleyball - Class AA
- Wrestling - Class AA
