= John Patrick (American football) =

American football player (1918–2000)

No. 17, 64, 27
- Position: Back

Personal information
- Born: January 16, 1918; Central City, Pennsylvania, U.S.
- Died: April 29, 2000 (aged 82); Johnstown, Pennsylvania, U.S.
- Listed height: 6 ft 0 in (1.83 m)
- Listed weight: 202 lb (92 kg)

Career information
- High school: Shade Township (Shade Township, Pennsylvania)
- College: Penn State
- NFL draft: 1941: 12th round, 101st overall pick

Career history
- Pittsburgh Steelers (1941, 1945–1946)

Career NFL statistics
- Games played: 18
- Games started: 8
- Interceptions: 1
- Stats at Pro Football Reference

John Raymond Patrick (January 16, 1918 – April 29, 2000) was an American professional football player who was a blocking back for three seasons in the National Football League (NFL) for the Pittsburgh Steelers in 1941, 1945, and 1946. He played college football for the Penn State Nittany Lions before being selected by the Philadelphia Eagles in the 12th round of the 1941 NFL draft. His rights were transferred to the Steelers due to the events later referred to as the Pennsylvania Polka. He served in World War II for the United States Army before rejoining the Steelers in 1945.
