= Shade Junior/Senior High School =

Coordinates: 40.1209°N 78.8131°W

Location
- 203 McGregor Avenue; Shade Township, Somerset County, Pennsylvania; Cairnbrook, Pennsylvania 15924

Information
- School type: Public Junior/Senior High School
- School district: Shade-Central City School District
- NCES District ID: 4221180
- Superintendent: John Krupper
- NCES School ID: 422118004006
- High School Principal: Allan Berkhimer
- Faculty: 18.80 (FTE)
- Employees: 15
- Grades: 7–12
- Enrollment: 221 (2017-18)
- Student to teacher ratio: 11.76
- Colors: Navy Blue and Gold
- Athletics conference: PIAA District V / WestPac
- Team name: Panthers
- Newspaper: Shadarow
- Yearbook: Shadonian
- Communities served: Cairnbrook, Central City
- Feeder schools: Cairnbrook Elementary School
- Website: Shade Junior/Senior High School

Shade Junior/Senior High School is a public secondary school serving nearly 300 students in grades 7-12 in the Shade Township coal patch of Cairnbrook.

== Alma Mater ==
Our strong band can ne'er be broken
form'd in old Shade High
far surpassing wealth unspoken
seal'd by friendship's tie
alma mater, alma mater,
deep graven on each heart
shall be found unwav'ring true when
we from life shall part.
High school life at best is passing,
gliding swiftly by;
then let us pledge in word and deed,
our love for old Shade High.

== Curriculum ==
Shade offers instruction in the following program areas:

- Arts and Humanities - including the Music Curriculum
- Driver's Education
- Family & Consumer Sciences
- Health, Safety & Physical Education - Including Health in the 8th Grade and First Aid during the Sophomore year
- Mathematics
- Science
- Social Studies
- Technology - Including Web Design

=== Vocational education ===
Students in grades 10–12, who wish to pursue training in a specific career path or field may attend the Somerset County Technology Center in Somerset Township.

== Clubs and activities ==
There are the following clubs at Shade:

- Band
- Cheerleaders
- Drama Club
- Envirothon
- National Honor Society
- SADD
- Ski Club
- Student Council
- TATU (Teens Against Tobacco Use)
- Varsity Club
- Yearbook

== Athletics ==
Shade participates in PIAA District V's WestPac Conference. Students at Shade participate in Johnstown Christian School's Soccer team and Shanksville-Stonycreek'sGolf, Rifle and Girls Tennis Teams. Meanwhile, Shanksville-Stonycreek's students come to Shade to participate in Football and Track and Field under cooperative sports agreements.

Sport	Boys/Class	Girls/Class
Baseball	Class A	
Basketball	Class A	Class A
Football	Class A	
Softball		Class A
Track and Field	Class AA	Class AA
Volleyball		Class A
Wrestling	Class AA	
