= Shanksville-Stonycreek High School =

Coordinates: 40.01381°N 78.89639°W

Location
- 1325 Cornerstone Road; Shanksville, Pennsylvania; Shanksville, Pennsylvania 15541

Information
- School type: Public High School
- Opened: 1929
- School district: Shanksville-Stonycreek School District
- NCES District ID: 4221270
- Superintendent: Sam Romesburg III
- NCES School ID: 422127006800
- Secondary Principal: Reno Barkman
- Faculty: 7.64 (FTE)
- Grades: 9-12
- Enrollment: 102 (2017-18)
- Student to teacher ratio: 13.35
- Colors: Blue and Gold
- Athletics conference: PIAA District V
- Team name: Vikings
- Newspaper: The Viklet
- Communities served: Indian Lake, Shanksville
- Feeder schools: Shanksville-Stonycreek Middle School
- Website: Shanksville-Stonycreek High School

Shanksville-Stonycreek High School, located near the small community of Shanksville, in central Somerset County is a small high school serving a census of 146 in grades 9-12. Located within five miles is the newly dedicated Flight 93 National Memorial in Pennsylvania's Laurel Highlands.

== School history ==
The school was originally constructed in 1929 and was renovated and modified two times prior (1954 and 1988) to the recent renovation in 2000, when state-of-the-art science facilities, a gymnasium with locker rooms, art and music rooms, tech ed classrooms, and a wood shop, as well as ADA improvements were made, completing the $9.0 million project.

== Vocational education ==
Students in grades 10-12, who wish to pursue training in a specific career path or field may attend the Somerset County Technology Center in Somerset Township.

== Athletics ==
Shanksville-Stonycreek participates in PIAA District V. Cooperative sports in Soccer and Football at Berlin-Brothersvalley and at Shade for Track and Field.

Sport	Boys/Class	Girls/Class
Baseball	Class A	
Basketball	Class A	Class A
Golf	Class AAAA	Class AAAA
Rifle	Class AAAA	Class AAAA
Softball		Class A
Tennis		Class AA
Volleyball		Class A
