= Boswell Historic District =

Historic district in Pennsylvania, United States

- U.S. National Register of Historic Places
- U.S. Historic district
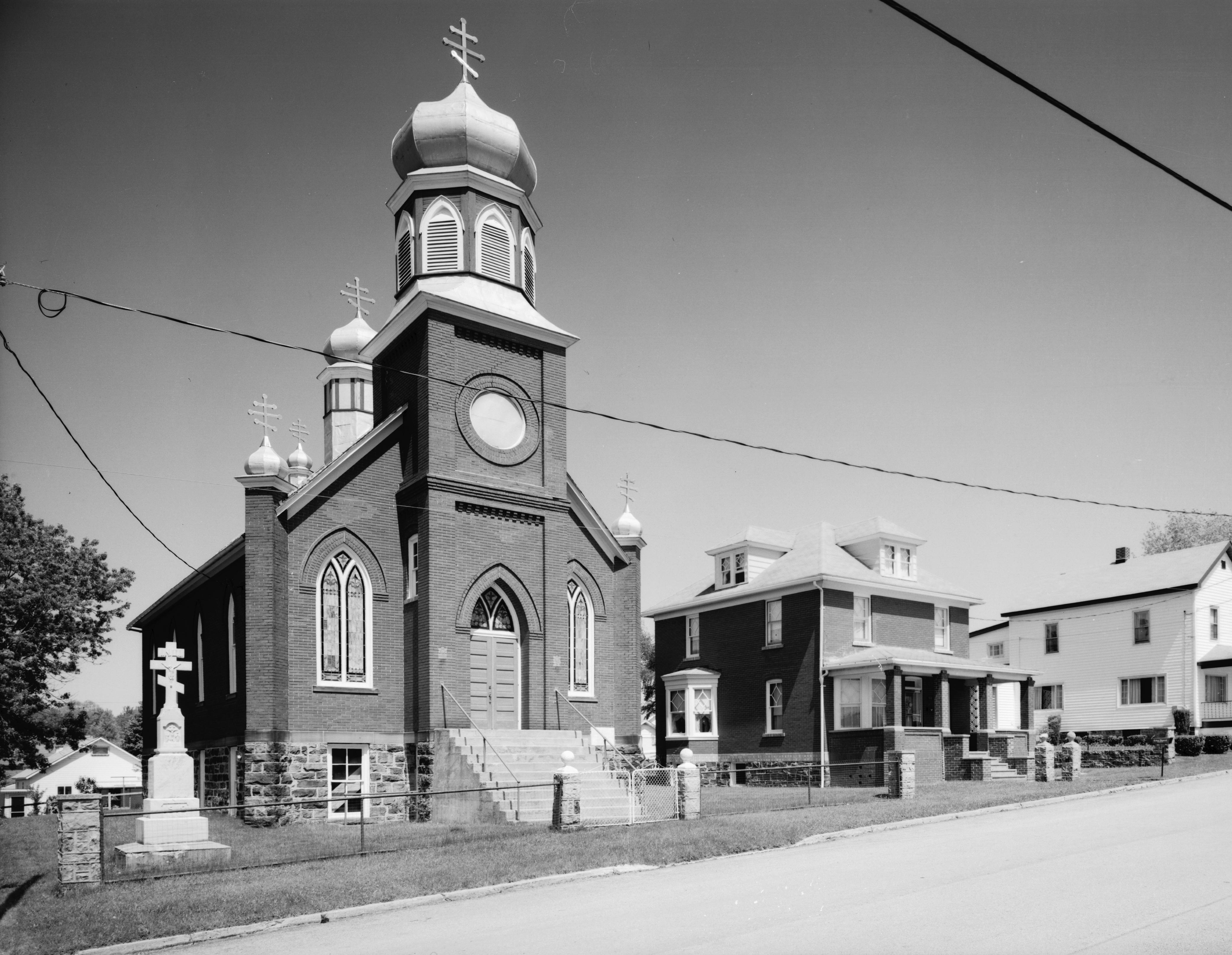
- Sts. Peter and Paul Russian Orthodox Greek Catholic Church, 1992

- Location within Pennsylvania Location within the United States
- Location: Roughly bounded by Hower Ave., Atkinson Way, Quemahoning Creek, Main St. and Juniata St., Boswell, Pennsylvania
- Coordinates: 40°09′47″N 79°01′40″W
- Area: 80 acres (32 ha)
- Built: 1901
- Architect: Multiple
- Architectural style: Colonial Revival, Late Victorian
- MPS: Bituminous Coal and Coke Resources of Pennsylvania MPS
- NRHP reference No.: 94000519
- Added to NRHP: June 3, 1994

Boswell Historic District is a national historic district located at Boswell in Somerset County, Pennsylvania. The district includes 90 contributing buildings and 1 contributing site. It encompasses an area developed by the Merchant's Mining Company of Baltimore, Maryland starting in 1901. It includes the remaining extant mine resources and the archaeological remains of the mine. They consist of utilitarian industrial buildings, four types of vernacular housing, and a variety of commercial, social, and institutional buildings. Notable buildings include the First National Bank of Boswell (1919), Merchant's Coal Company office (1901), St. Stanislaus Roman Catholic Church (1918), and Sts. Peter and Paul Russian Orthodox Church (1918).

It was listed on the National Register of Historic Places in 1994.
