= Somerset Area High School =

Coordinates: 40.00263°N 79.08596°W

Location
- 645 So. Columbia Avenue; Somerset, Pennsylvania 15501

Information
- School type: Public High School
- School district: Somerset Area School District
- NCES District ID: 4221840
- Superintendent: Krista S. Mathias
- NCES School ID: 422184004015
- Principal: Scott Shirley
- Faculty: 87.50 (FTE)
- Grades: 6-12
- Enrollment: 1,149 (2017-18)
- Student to teacher ratio: 13.13
- Colors: Orange and Black
- Athletics conference: PIAA District VI
- Mascot: Golden Eagle
- Team name: Eagles
- Communities served: Somerset
- Feeder schools: Somerset Area Middle School
- Website: Somerset Area High School

Somerset Area High School is a public high school in Somerset, Pennsylvania, United States, the county seat of Somerset County. The school serves about 700 students in grades 9-12 and is attached to the Somerset Area Middle School.

== Academics ==
Students at Somerset area may participate in career tracks including:

- College Preparatory
- Information Management & Technology
- Agriculture Education
- Career/Technology - Students attend Somerset County Technology Center for 1/2 Day, each school day.

=== Graduation Requirements ===
According to the student handbook Students must have 24 credits in order to graduate, and must have at least 10 by the end of their sophomore year.

Subject Area	#/Credits	Notes
English	4.0	
History	4.0	Must Include:Civics, World Cultures, American Cultures, Government, Economics
Science	3.0	
Mathematics	3.0	
Internet Applications	0.5	Beginning with the class of 2006
Health	0.5	
Physical Education	2.0	Must be taken each year
Highway Safety	0.5	
Electives	6.5	
Total	24.0	

=== Vocational Education ===
Students in grades 10–12, who wish to pursue training in a specific career path or field may attend the Somerset County Technology Center in Somerset Township.

== Athletics ==
Somerset participates in PIAA District VI, although other neighboring school districts do not participate in District VI.:

- Baseball - Class AAA
- Basketball - Class AAA
- Cross Country - Class AA
- Football - Class AA
- Boys Golf - Class AAAA
- Rifle - Class AAAA
- Soccer - Class AA/AAA
- Softball - Class AAA
- Swimming and Diving - Class AA
- Tennis - Class AA
- Track and Field - Class AA
- Volleyball - Class AA
- Wrestling - Class AA

== Notable alumni ==
- Henry K. Fluck (1930), US Army major general
