= Berlin Brothersvalley High School =

Coordinates: 39.92175°N 78.94708°W

Location
- 1025 Main Street; Berlin, Pennsylvania 15530

Information
- School district: Berlin Brothersvalley School District
- NCES District ID: 4203420
- Superintendent: Eric Lauer (interim)
- NCES School ID: 420342006207
- Principal: Jim Maddy
- Teaching staff: 29.41 (FTE)
- Grades: 9–12
- Enrollment: 236 (2023–2024)
- Student to teacher ratio: 8.02
- Color
- Athletics conference: PIAA District V
- Team name: Mountaineers
- Newspaper: The Mountaineer
- Yearbook: Bervalon
- Communities served: Berlin, New Baltimore, Northampton Twp., Brothersvalley Twp., Fairhope, Allegheny
- Feeder schools: Berlin Brothersvalley Middle School

Berlin Brothersvalley High School is a small public high school, located in the central Somerset County town of Berlin, Pennsylvania. The high school is connected to the middle school and elementary school.

== Curriculum ==
BBHS has curriculum in the following subjects and areas of study:

- Agriculture Education
- Computer Education
- Family and Consumer Sciences
- English
- Fine Arts - Including Mountaineers in Motion Community Service Class
- Health
- Language - French and Spanish
- Mathematics
- Physical Education
- Technology Education
- Science
- Social Studies

=== Vocational education ===
Students in grades 10–12 who wish to pursue training in a specific career path or field may attend the Somerset County Technology Center in Somerset Township.

== Graduation requirements ==
According to the course catalog
, Students must meet the following credits to graduate from BBHS.

Course of Study	Credit(s)
English	4.0
Social Studies	3.0
Math	3.0
Science	3.0
Computer Science	1.5
Graduation Project	0.5
Concentration Pathway	6.0
Electives	3.0
Physical Education	1.0
Health	1.0
TOTAL	26.0

Students planning to attend a four-year post-secondary institution must take 4 credits of math and science courses.

== Sports teams ==
The school mascot for all three schools is the Mountaineer, and the school colors are royal blue and white. BBHS participates in PIAA District V. Berlin Brothersvalley High School has a cooperative sports agreement with Shanksville-Stonycreek School District to offer wrestling and soccer, also co-ops with Shanksville-Stonycreek School District and Rockwood Area Junior/Senior High School for football. Rockwood also goes to Berlin for wrestling.

Sport Name	Boys	Girls
Football	Class A	
Basketball	Class A	Class A
Baseball	Class A	
Volleyball		Class A
Softball,		Class AA
Rifle	Class AAAA	Class AAAA
Golf	Class AAAA	Class AAAA
Track and Field	Class AA	Class AA
