= Shade Creek =

Coordinates: 40.186226°N 78.860286°W

Shade Creek is a tributary of Stonycreek River in Somerset County, Pennsylvania in the United States.

Shade Creek, formed by the confluence of Dark Shade and Clear Shade creeks approximately 1.9 miles (3.1 km) downstream of the community of Cairnbrook, flows for 9.5 miles (15.3 km) to join the Stonycreek River at the community of Seanor.

== Dark Shade Creek ==
Dark Shade Creek joins Clear Shade Creek, approximately 1.9 miles (3.1 km) downstream of the community of Cairnbrook, to form Shade Creek.

== Clear Shade Creek ==
Clear Shade Creek originates in Gallitzin State Forest, east of Windber, before joining Dark Shade Creek, approximately 1.9 miles (3.1 km) downstream of the community of Cairnbrook, to form Shade Creek.

== See also ==
- List of rivers of Pennsylvania
