= Shade-Central City School District =

School district in Pennsylvania

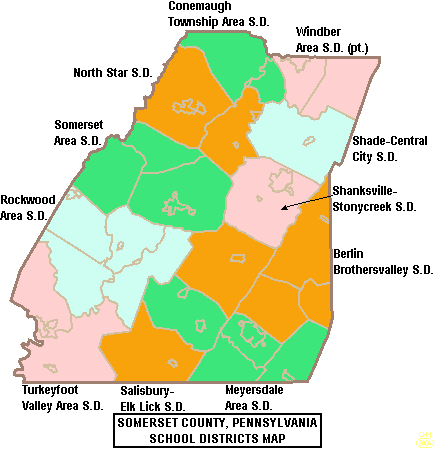

Address
- 203 McGregor Ave. Cairnbrook, Pennsylvania, 15924; United States

District information
- Type: Public

Students and staff
- District mascot: Panthers
- Colors: Blue and gold

Other information
- Website: shade.k12.pa.us

The Shade-Central School District is a public school district located in Somerset County, Pennsylvania. It is eponymous, serving the borough of Central City and the Township of Shade.

== School complex ==
There is the Shade Junior/Senior High School (Grades 7–12) and the Cairnbrook Elementary School (Grades K-6). They are both located on the same campus on McGregor Avenue, in the village of Cairnbrook in Shade Township. The district encompasses approximately 68 square miles. According to 2000 federal census data, it serves a resident population of 4,144. District officials reported in school year 2005–06, that the SCCSD provided basic educational services to 625 pupils through the employment of 44 teachers, 47 full-time and part-time support personnel, and 3 administrators.

== Extracurriculars ==
The district offers a variety of clubs, activities and sports.

=== Athletics ===
The school board approved an athletic partnership with North Star School District that impacts the 2011 track season. North Star students participating in track will train and travel with the track consortium at Shade-Central City School, which includes student athletes from Shanksville-Stonycreek School District and Johnstown Christian School.

- Baseball – Class A
- Basketball – Class A
- Football – Class A
- Softball – Class A
- Track and field – Class AA
- Volleyball – Class A
- Wrestling – Class AA
