= Edie, Pennsylvania =

Unincorporated community in Pennsylvania, US

Coordinates: 40°05′12″N 79°07′37″W

- Census-designated place
- Interactive map of Edie, Pennsylvania
- Country: United States
- State: Pennsylvania
- County: Somerset

Area
  - Total: 0.56 sq mi (1.46 km^{2})
  - Land: 0.56 sq mi (1.46 km^{2})
  - Water: 0 sq mi (0.00 km^{2})

Population (2020)
  - Total: 77
  - Density: 136.3/sq mi (52.62/km^{2})
- Time zone: UTC-5 (Eastern (EST))
  - Summer (DST): UTC-4 (EDT)
- FIPS code: 42-22600

Edie is a census-designated place located in Lincoln Township, Somerset County in the state of Pennsylvania, United States. As of 2021, the population was estimated to be 62.

Historical population
Census	Pop.	Note	%±
2020	77		—
U.S. Decennial Census
