= Cairnbrook, Pennsylvania =

Unincorporated community in Pennsylvania, US

Cairnbrook
- Census-designated place
- Location within the state of Pennsylvania Cairnbrook (the United States)
- Coordinates: 40°7′8″N 78°49′5″W
- Country: United States
- State: Pennsylvania
- County: Somerset

Area
  - Total: 0.85 sq mi (2.19 km^{2})
  - Land: 0.85 sq mi (2.19 km^{2})
  - Water: 0 sq mi (0.00 km^{2})
- Elevation: 2,215 ft (675 m)

Population (2020)
  - Total: 505
  - Density: 598.2/sq mi (230.96/km^{2})
- Time zone: UTC-5 (Eastern (EST))
  - Summer (DST): UTC-4 (EDT)
- ZIP codes: 15924
- FIPS code: 42-10720
- GNIS feature ID: 1170870

Cairnbrook is a census-designated place and coal town in Shade Township, Pennsylvania, United States. The community is located along Pennsylvania Route 160 within a mile of the borough of Central City. As of the 2010 census, the population was 520 residents.

== Demographics ==
Historical population
Census	Pop.	Note	%±
2020	505		—
U.S. Decennial Census

== See also ==
- Cairnbrook Historic District
