= North Star School District =

School district in Pennsylvania

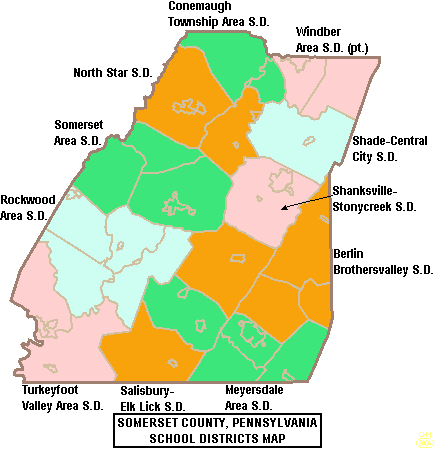

Location
- Somerset County, Pennsylvania United States

District information
- Type: Public
- Established: 1969

Students and staff
- District mascot: Cougars
- Colors: Forest Green and White

Other information
- Website: https://www.nscougars.com/

The North Star School District in Boswell, Somerset County, Pennsylvania in the United States was formed in 1969 with the merger of predecessors Jenner-Boswell and Forbes school districts. The district includes the boroughs of Boswell, Stoystown, Jennerstown, and Hooversville and the townships Jenner and Quemahoning in Somerset County, Pennsylvania. The name North Star is taken from U.S. Route 219, the North Star Way, which runs through the district. That name for the highway has since fallen out of favor. The district encompasses approximately 102 square miles. According to 2000 federal census data, it serves a resident population of 9,519.

== Schools ==
- North Star High School - Grades 9-12
- North Star Middle School - Grades 5-8
- North Star Elementary School - Grades K-4

== Notable alumni ==
- Joseph Darby, who in April 2004 The Pentagon credited as the lone soldier who came forward to halt and expose the Abu Ghraib prisoner-of-war abuse scandal in Baghdad, Iraq, is a graduate of North Star High School. Darby received the 2005 Profile in Courage Award from the John F. Kennedy Foundation.
