= Somerset Area School District =

School district in Pennsylvania

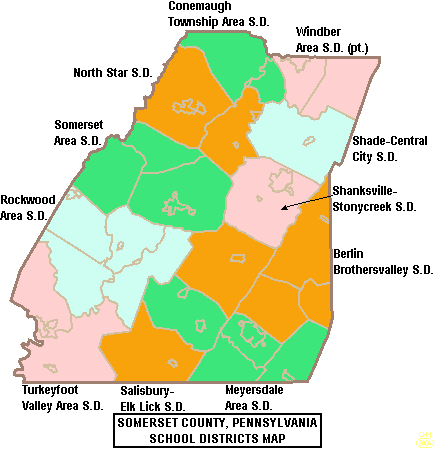

Location
- Somerset County, Pennsylvania Somerset, Pennsylvania; United States

District information
- Type: Public

Students and staff
- District mascot: Golden Eagles

Other information
- Website: sasd.us

The Somerset Area School District is a public school district in Somerset County, Pennsylvania. The district boundaries are within Somerset Borough and the townships of Jefferson, Lincoln and Somerset. A small portion of Brothersvalley Township is in the district. It includes the Friedens census-designated place in Somerset Township. The district encompasses 156 square miles (400 km^{2}) and occupies five buildings. The district has done major renovations to the junior and senior high schools, as well as the athletic field and athletic complex.

== Schools ==
There are three schools in the district:

School name	Street Address	Grade Level
Maple Ridge Elementary School	105 New Centerville Road; Somerset, Pennsylvania 15501	K-2
Eagle View Elementary School	191 Discovery Lane; Somerset, Pennsylvania 15501	3-5
Somerset Middle School; Somerset High School	645 So. Columbia Avenue; Somerset, Pennsylvania 15501	6-8; 9-12

== Extracurriculars ==
The district offers a variety of clubs, activities and sports.

=== Arts ===
A comprehensive music program offers chorus, orchestra, and band beginning in the elementary grades. Annual junior high school and senior high school musicals are integral part of the entire program. A wide range of academic co-curricular opportunities is also available at all grade levels.
