= Shanksville, Pennsylvania =

Borough in Pennsylvania, US

- Borough
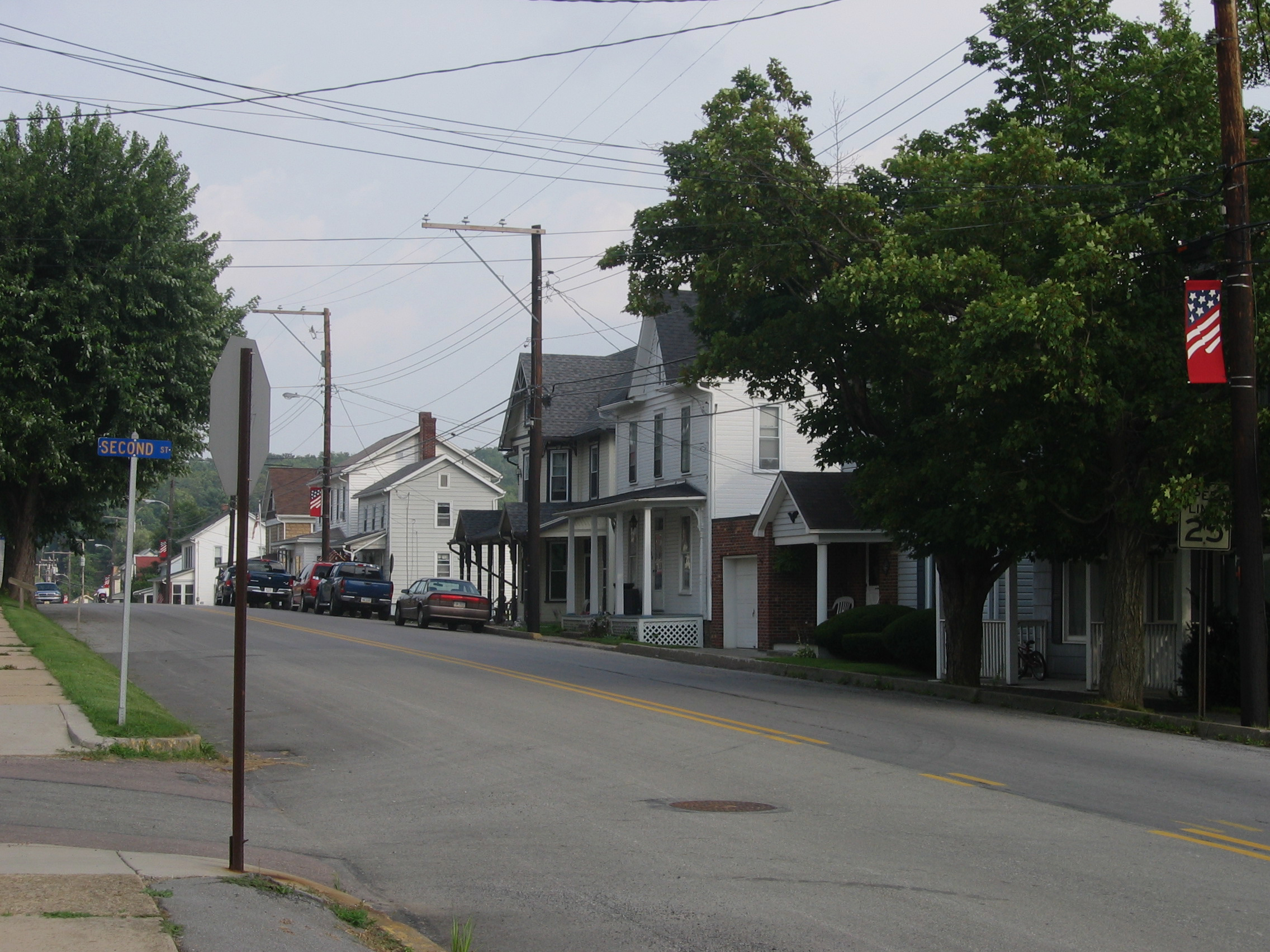
- Shanksville's Main Street in July 2006
- Etymology: Christian Shank (founder)
- Location of Shanksville in Somerset County, Pennsylvania.

- Location of Pennsylvania in the United States
- Coordinates: 40°1′2″N 78°54′21″W
- Country: United States
- State: Pennsylvania
- County: Somerset
- Township: Stonycreek
- Settled: 1798
- Incorporated: January 25, 1913
- Founder: Christian Shank

Area
  - Total: 0.20 sq mi (0.51 km^{2})
  - Land: 0.20 sq mi (0.51 km^{2})
  - Water: 0 sq mi (0.00 km^{2})

Population (2020)
  - Total: 199
  - Estimate (2024): 190
  - Density: 1,000/sq mi (390/km^{2})
- Time zone: UTC-5 (EST)
  - Summer (DST): UTC-4 (EDT)
- FIPS code: 42-69680

Shanksville is a borough in Somerset County, Pennsylvania, United States. It has a population of 199 as of the 2020 U.S. census. It is part of the Somerset, Pennsylvania Micropolitan Statistical Area and is located 78 miles (126 km) southeast of Pittsburgh and 226 miles (364 km) west of Philadelphia.

Shanksville garnered global attention during the September 11 attacks when United Airlines Flight 93, bound from Newark, New Jersey for San Francisco, crashed in adjacent Stonycreek Township after its passengers and crew members rebelled against the flight's al-Qaeda terrorist hijackers. It was the only one of the four hijacked planes that failed to reach the terrorists' intended target.

== Geography ==
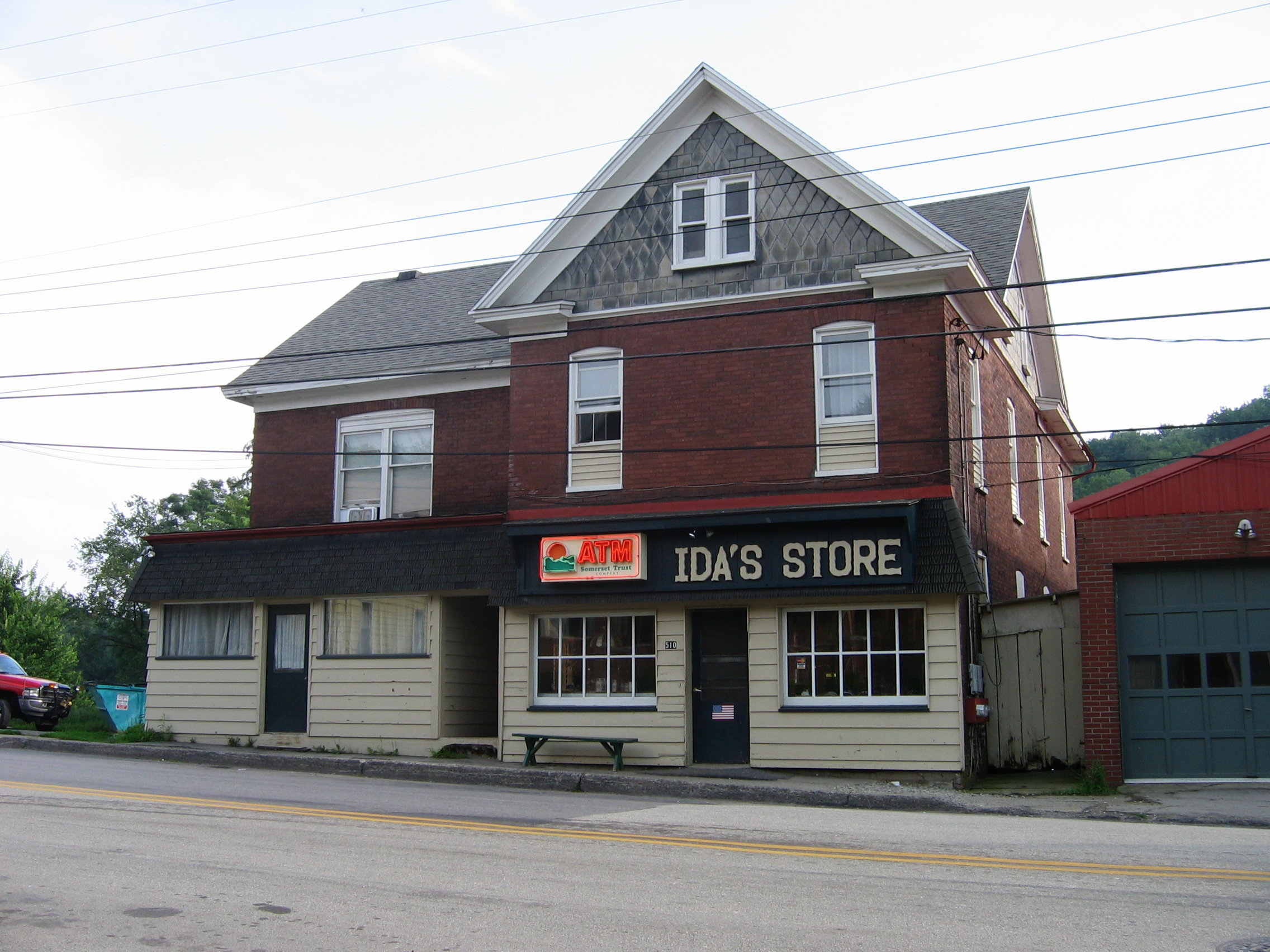
Ida's, Shanksville's general store

Shanksville is located at 40°1′2″N 78°54′21″W (40.017182, -78.905891), with the borough covering 0.2 square mile (0.5 km^{2}) of land. It also has the seventh-highest elevation of boroughs in Pennsylvania, peaking at 2,230 feet (680 m).

== Demographics ==
Historical population
Census	Pop.	Note	%±
1920	260		—
1930	272		4.6%
1940	324		19.1%
1950	342		5.6%
1960	314		−8.2%
1970	275		−12.4%
1980	273		−0.7%
1990	235		−13.9%
2000	245		4.3%
2010	237		−3.3%
2020	199		−16.0%
2024 (est.)	190	▼	−4.5%

As of the 2000 census, there were 245 people comprising 96 households and 69 families residing in the borough. The population density was 1,391.9 inhabitants per square mile (537.4/km^{2}). There were 100 housing units at an average density of 568.1 per square mile (219.3/km^{2}). The racial makeup of the borough was 100.00% white.

There were 96 households, out of which 32.3% had children under the age of 18 living with them, 54.2% were married couples living together, 12.5% had a female householder with no husband present, and 28.1% were non-families. 22.9% of all households were made up of individuals, and 9.4% had someone living alone who was 65 years of age or older. The average household size was 2.55 and the average family size was 3.06.

In the borough, the population was spread out, with 26.5% under the age of 18, 10.2% from 18 to 24, 28.2% from 25 to 44, 19.6% from 45 to 64, and 15.5% who were 65 years of age or older. The median age was 36 years. For every 100 females there were 94.4 males. For every 100 females age 18 and over, there were 93.5 males.

The median income for a household in the borough was $29,980, and the median income for a family was $40,833. Males had a median income of $25,250 versus $25,917 for females. The per capita income for the borough was $14,500. About 4.8% of families and 9.1% of the population were below the poverty line, including 4.7% of those under the age of 18 and 12.5% of those 65 or over.

== History ==
Christian Shank, a German immigrant, built a cabin on Stony Creek in 1798, later building a grist mill and two saw mills in the vicinity. Emmanuel Shaffer opened a store at the site in 1828, and the following year Shank laid out the town of Shanksville. The town was the home of John Suhre, a Union army private who was fatally wounded at the Battle of Fredericksburg and whose last days are described in Louisa May Alcott's short novel Hospital Sketches. The Shanksville post office was opened in 1874. Shanksville was incorporated as a borough on January 25, 1913.

=== September 11 attacks ===
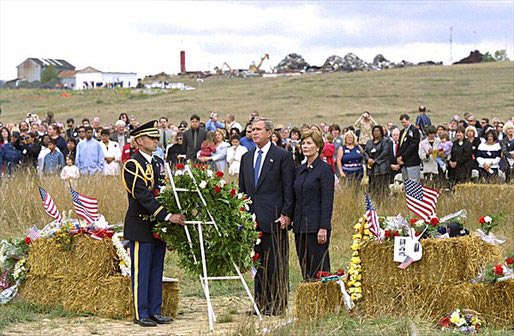
U.S. President George W. Bush and first lady Laura Bush visit Stonycreek Township near Shanksville on the first anniversary of the September 11 attacks.

On September 11, 2001, during the terrorist attacks on the United States, Shanksville received worldwide attention after United Airlines Flight 93 crashed into a field in Stonycreek Township, 1.75 miles (2.82 km) north of the town of Shanksville, killing all 40 civilians and four al-Qaeda hijackers on board. The hijackers had intended to fly the plane to Washington, D.C. to crash it into a government building, likely the U.S. Capitol or the White House. However, after learning from family members via airphone of the earlier attacks on the World Trade Center and The Pentagon, the passengers on board revolted against the hijackers and fought for control of the plane, causing it to crash. It was the only one of the four aircraft hijacked that day that never reached its intended target.

There are two memorials to the event. The original, temporary Flight 93 National Memorial to the passengers and crew of Flight 93 was located on a hill, about 500 yards (460 m) from the crash site. On July 8, 2010, a new temporary entrance and memorial were opened at an area called the Western Overlook. It is where the FBI set up its command center, where family members first saw the aftermath of the crash, bringing their own memorials, and where visitors can leave them today. The initial phase of permanent construction of the Flight 93 National Memorial, including the visitors' center, was completed by the 10th anniversary in 2011. The memorial is built around the crash site, following the plane's flight path, and protecting the area of impact, known as the Sacred Ground, which remains protected and accessible only to family members of the passengers and crew.

Shanksville's volunteer firefighters and emergency personnel from the nearby towns of Central City, Somerset, and others rushed to the crash scene to search for survivors. Members of the New York City Fire Department donated to the Shanksville Volunteer Fire Department a cross-shaped piece of steel salvaged from the World Trade Center. Mounted atop a Pentagon-shaped base, it was installed outside the firehouse and dedicated on August 24, 2008.

== Government ==
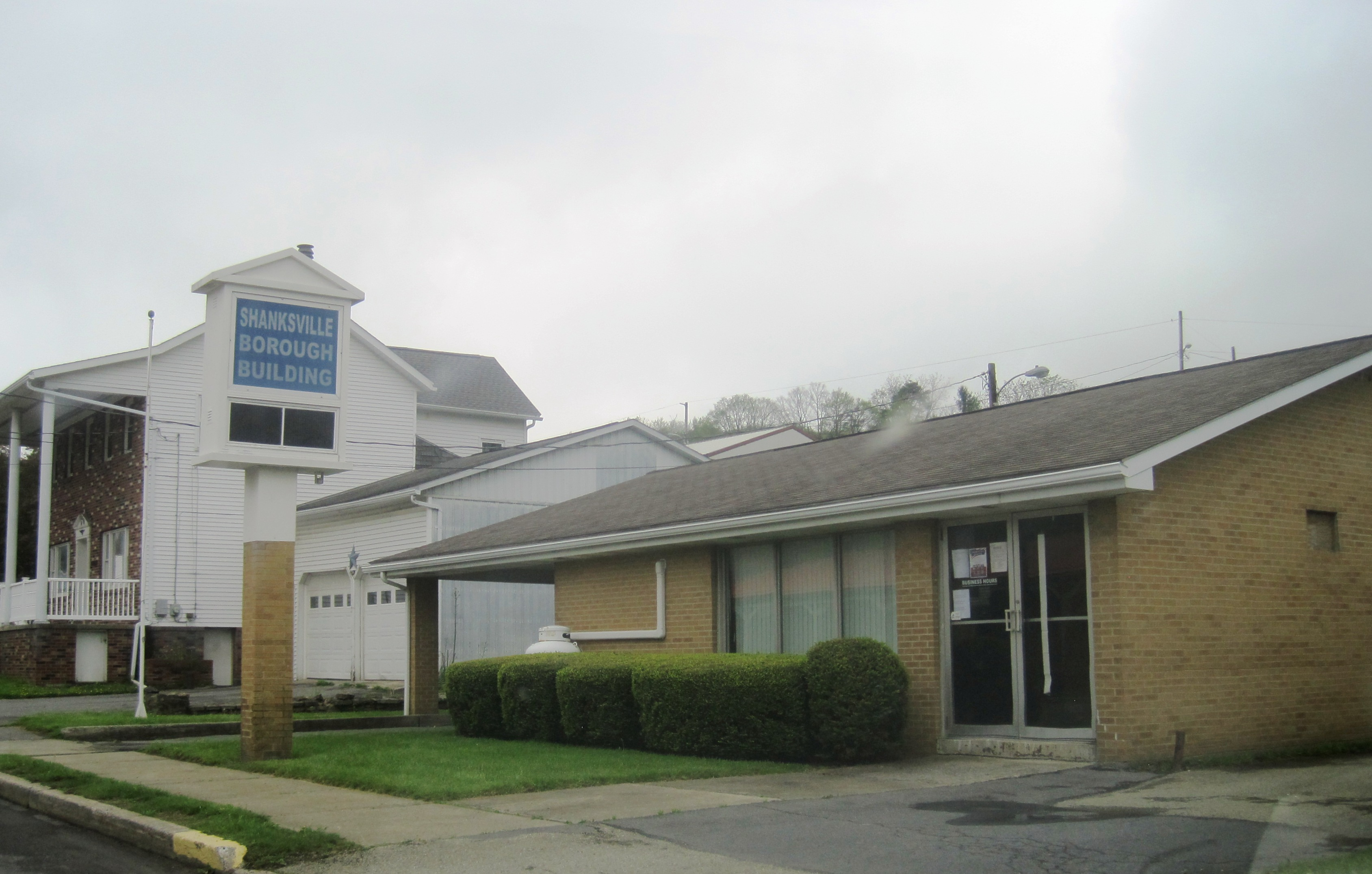
Shanksville Borough Hall

The mayor of Shanksville is Chris Baeckel.

== Education ==
The Shanksville-Stonycreek School District is the area school district and operates public schools.
