= Indian Lake, Pennsylvania =

Borough in Pennsylvania, US

- Borough
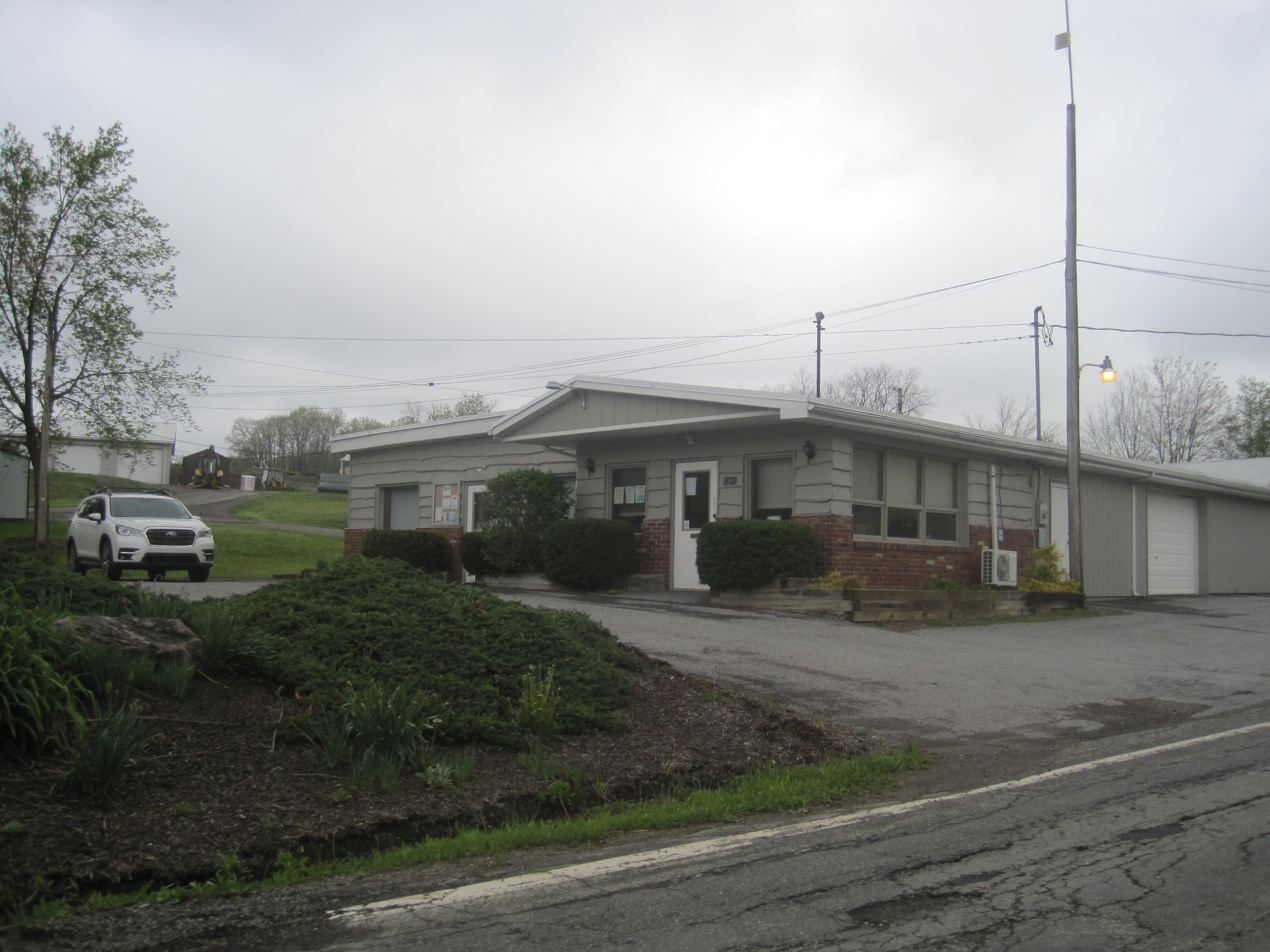
- Indian Lake Borough Hall

- Location of Indian Lake in Somerset County, Pennsylvania.

- Location within Pennsylvania
- Coordinates: 40°02′51″N 78°51′33″W
- Country: United States
- State: Pennsylvania
- County: Somerset
- Established: 1966

Government
  - Type: Borough Council
  - Mayor: Jay McClatchey
  - Borough Manager: Kirsten Siehl

Area
  - Total: 4.35 sq mi (11.26 km^{2})
  - Land: 3.56 sq mi (9.23 km^{2})
  - Water: 0.79 sq mi (2.04 km^{2})
- Elevation: 2,281 ft (695 m)

Population (2020)
  - Total: 390
  - Density: 109.5/sq mi (42.26/km^{2})
- Time zone: UTC-5 (Eastern (EST))
  - Summer (DST): UTC-4 (EDT)
- Area code: 814
- FIPS code: 42-36888
- Website: Indian Lake Home Page

Indian Lake is a borough in Somerset County, Pennsylvania, United States. It is part of the Johnstown, Pennsylvania Metropolitan Statistical Area. The population was 391 at the 2020 census, down from 394 in 2010. Indian Lake is home to Indian Lake Golf Club, which opened in 1974, and was the first to be designed by Arnold Palmer, Northwinds Golf Course (public), Indian Lake Resort (fine dining, banquet, and lodging), Indian Lake Marina, and the James W. McIntyre Hiking and Biking Trail. United Airlines Flight 93 crashed near here into the field in Stonycreek Township during the attacks.

== Geography ==
According to the United States Census Bureau, the borough has a total area of 4.5 square miles (12 km^{2}), of which, 3.7 square miles (9.6 km^{2}) of it is land and 0.8 square miles (2.1 km^{2}) of it (17.26%) is water.

Indian Lake has the fourth-highest elevation of towns in Pennsylvania, at 2,281 feet. This is the Lake water level, homes at Indian Lake range from 2,300 to 2,550 feet in base elevation.

== Demographics ==
Historical population
Census	Pop.	Note	%±
1970	129		—
1980	306		137.2%
1990	388		26.8%
2000	450		16.0%
2010	394		−12.4%
2020	390		−1.0%
2021 (est.)	390	Steady	0.0%

As of the census of 2000, there were 450 people, 206 households, and 146 families residing in the borough. The population density was 122.0 inhabitants per square mile (47.1/km^{2}). There were 548 housing units at an average density of 148.5 per square mile (57.3/km^{2}). The racial makeup of the borough was 99.33% White, 0.22% from other races, and 0.44% from two or more races. Hispanic or Latino of any race were 0.44% of the population.

In 2000 there were 206 households, of which 16.5% had children under the age of 18 living with them, 66.0% were married couples living together, 1.9% had a female householder with no husband present, and 29.1% were non-families. 22.3% of all households were made up of individuals, and 9.7% had someone living alone who was 65 years of age or older. The average household size was 2.18 and the average family size was 2.53.

In the borough the population has 14.2% under the age of 18, 4.4% from 18 to 24, 27.3% from 25 to 44, 34.7% from 45 to 64, and 19.3% who were 65 years of age or older. The median age was 47 years. For every 100 females there were 110.3 males. For every 100 females aged 18 and over, there were 113.3 males.

The median income for a household in the borough was $53,750, and the median income for a family was $58,214. Males had a median income of $44,792 versus $28,750 for females. The per capita income for the borough was $27,630. About 1.4% of families and 2.9% of the population were below the poverty line, including none of those under age 18 and 2.8% of those age 65 or over.

== Education ==
Its school district is Shanksville-Stonycreek School District.
