= Shanksville-Stonycreek School District =

School district in Pennsylvania

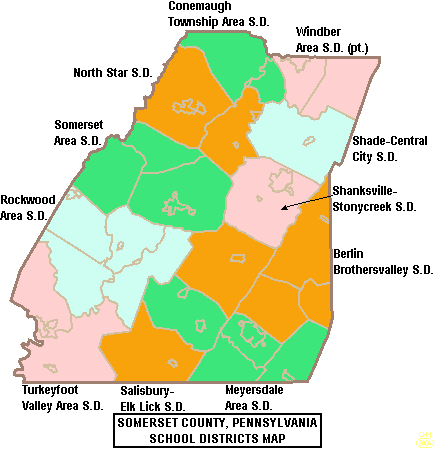
- 1325 Cornerstone Rd. Shanksville, Pennsylvania, 15560

District information
- Type: Public
- Established: 1929

Students and staff
- District mascot: Vikings
- Colors: Blue and Gold

Other information
- Website: http://www.sssd.com/

The Shanksville-Stonycreek School District is a public school district located in Somerset County, Pennsylvania. The school district serves the borough of Shanksville, Stonycreek Township, and the borough of Indian Lake. The district encompasses approximately 65 square miles (170 km^{2}). According to 2000 U.S. data, it serves a resident population of 2,916.

== Schools ==
The campus is located on Cornerstone Road, in Stonycreek Township, just outside Shanksville.

School name	Grades
Shanksville-Stonycreek Elementary School	K–5
Shanksville-Stonycreek Middle School	6–8
Shanksville-Stonycreek High School	9–12

== Extracurriculars ==
The district offers a variety of clubs, activities and sports.

=== Cooperative Sports ===
SSSD contracts with other districts in other sports:

- Berlin Brothersvalley School District – Soccer
- Shade-Central City School District – Track and field as well as football are Shade sports in which eligible Shanksville students may participate. Rifle, golf, and tennis are Shanksville sports in which eligible Shade students may participate.
