= Boswell, Pennsylvania =

Borough in Pennsylvania, US

- Borough
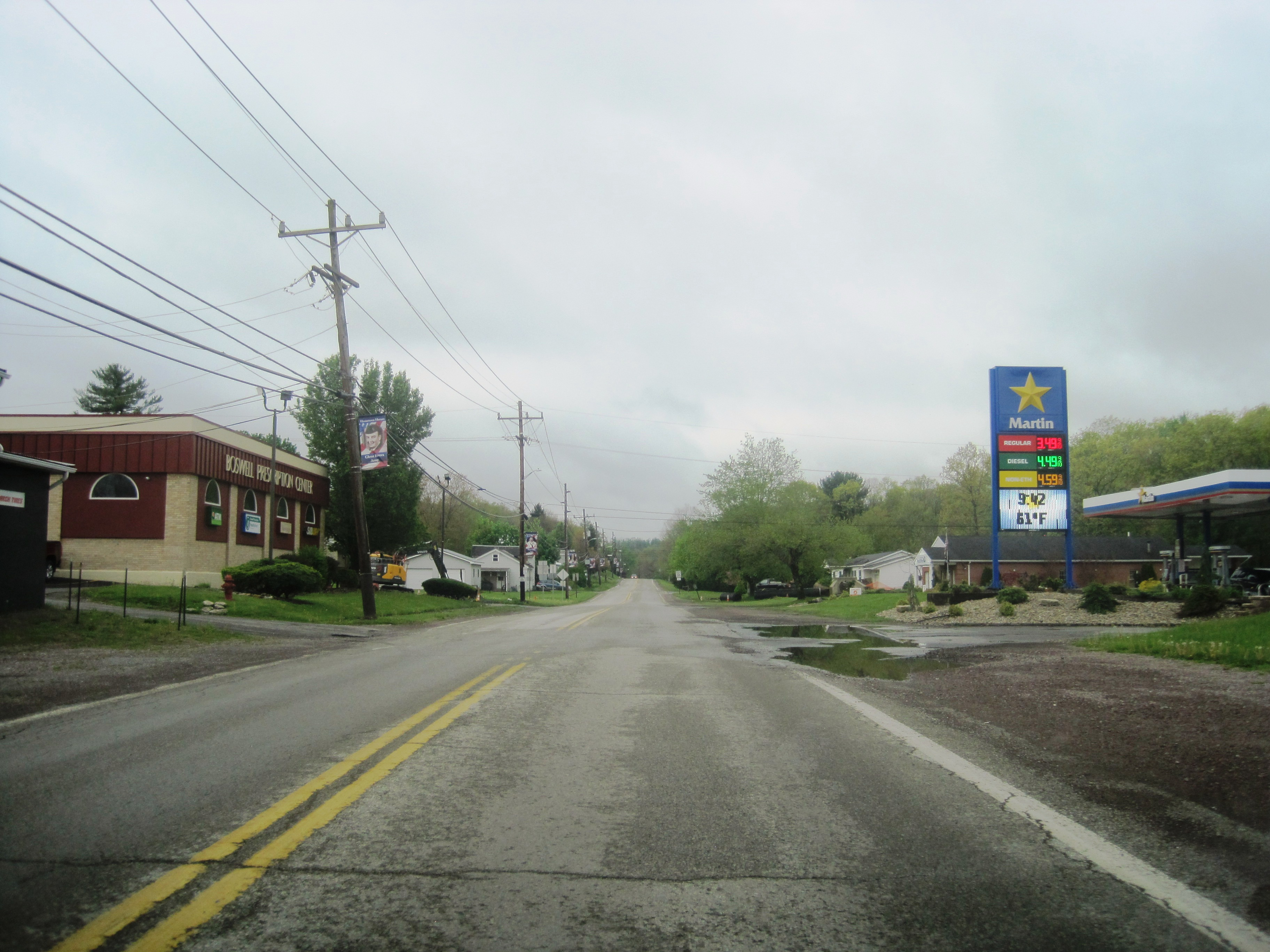
- Southbound PA 601 (Atkinson Way) in Boswell

- Location of Boswell in Somerset County, Pennsylvania.

- Location within Pennsylvania
- Coordinates: 40°09′37″N 79°01′40″W
- Country: United States
- State: Pennsylvania
- County: Somerset
- Settled: 1901
- Incorporated: February 22, 1904

Government
  - Type: Borough Council

Area
  - Total: 0.74 sq mi (1.91 km^{2})
  - Land: 0.74 sq mi (1.91 km^{2})
  - Water: 0 sq mi (0.00 km^{2})

Population (2020)
  - Total: 1,224
  - Density: 1,655.7/sq mi (639.27/km^{2})
- Time zone: UTC-5 (Eastern (EST))
  - Summer (DST): UTC-4 (EDT)
- Zip code: 15531
- Area code: 814
- FIPS code: 42-07712

Boswell is a borough in Somerset County, Pennsylvania, United States. It is part of the Johnstown, Pennsylvania Metropolitan Statistical Area. The population was 1,221 at the 2020 census.

== Geography ==
Boswell is located at 40°9′37″N 79°1′40″W (40.160329, -79.027712), approximately 60 miles (97 km) southwest of Altoona.

According to the United States Census Bureau, the borough has a total area of 0.7 square miles (1.8 km^{2}), all land.

== Demographics ==
Historical population
Census	Pop.	Note	%±
1910	1,878		—
1920	2,168		15.4%
1930	1,775		−18.1%
1940	1,711		−3.6%
1950	1,679		−1.9%
1960	1,508		−10.2%
1970	1,529		1.4%
1980	1,480		−3.2%
1990	1,485		0.3%
2000	1,364		−8.1%
2010	1,277		−6.4%
2020	1,224		−4.2%
2022 (est.)	1,212	▼	−1.0%

As of the census of 2000, there were 1,364 people, 608 households, and 370 families residing in the borough. The population density was 1,852.2 inhabitants per square mile (715.1/km^{2}). There were 681 housing units at an average density of 924.7 per square mile (357.0/km^{2}). The racial makeup of the borough was 99.27% White, 0.15% African American, 0.22% Native American, 0.07% Asian, and 0.29% from two or more races. Hispanic or Latino of any race were 0.07% of the population.

There were 608 households, out of which 28.1% had children under the age of 18 living with them, 41.9% were married couples living together, 13.8% had a female householder with no husband present, and 39.1% were non-families. 35.2% of all households were made up of individuals, and 17.9% had someone living alone who was 65 years of age or older. The average household size was 2.24 and the average family size was 2.92.

In the borough the population was spread out, with 23.8% under the age of 18, 7.9% from 18 to 24, 27.2% from 25 to 44, 21.0% from 45 to 64, and 20.0% who were 65 years of age or older. The median age was 39 years. For every 100 females there were 89.2 males. For every 100 females age 18 and over, there were 86.9 males.

The median income for a household in the borough was $20,875, and the median income for a family was $26,667. Males had a median income of $26,023 versus $18,958 for females. The per capita income for the borough was $12,036. About 26.4% of families and 29.1% of the population were below the poverty line, including 38.1% of those under age 18 and 14.6% of those age 65 or over.

== History ==
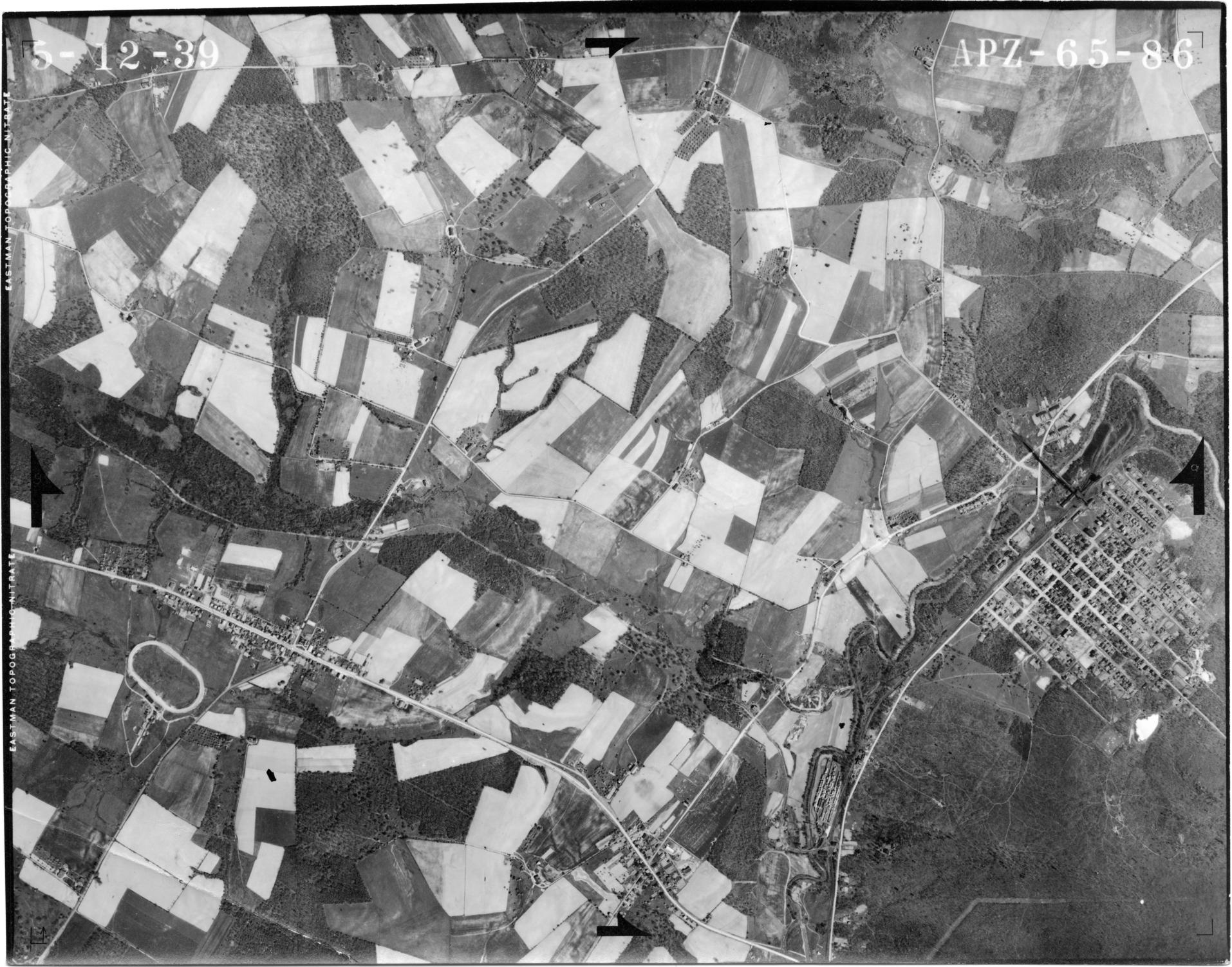
Aerial view of Boswell and vicinity, May 12, 1939. Photograph was taken six weeks after the mine closed permanently. Note the coal tipple just outside the town, which was dismantled in 1940.

Boswell was settled in 1901 and incorporated as a borough on February 22, 1904. The community's founder was Thomas Taylor Boswell, the first president and supervisor of the Merchants Coal Company. Mr. Boswell's company purchased 14,000 acres (57 km^{2}) of mineral rights under local farmland and laid out 1,600 lots for coal company houses to house the miners for its new deep coal mine just to the north. Merchants Coal, and the related Orenda Coal, were subsidiaries of Hillman Coal and Coke Company of Pittsburgh, the same firm that built the neighboring town of Jerome, Pennsylvania.

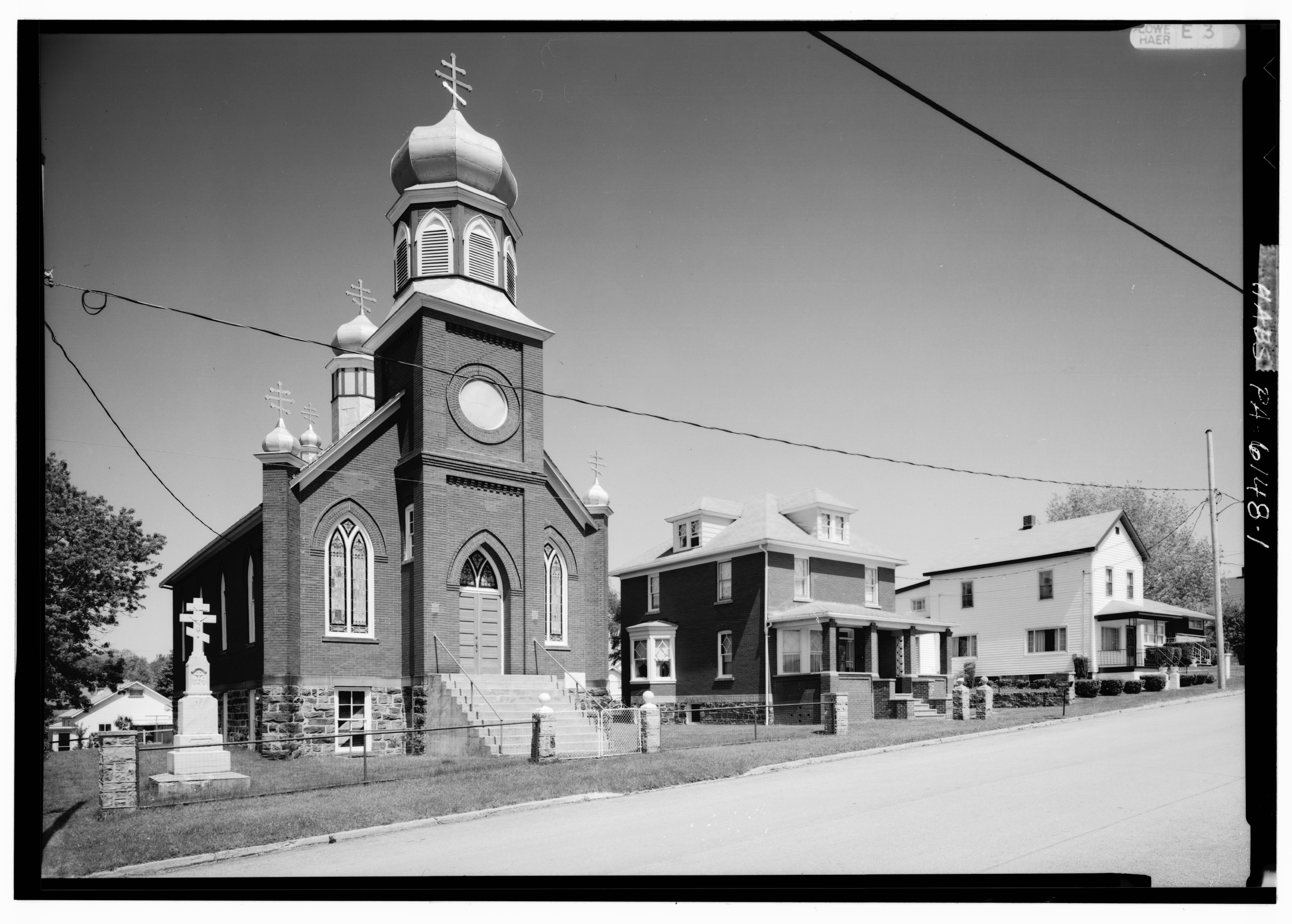
Houses and a church on Quemahoning Street

Merchants Coal attempted to build Boswell to be a notch above surrounding coal company towns in that plans included a central business district, a high school, and homes constructed from brick, as opposed to the wood used elsewhere. This also helped to prevent the spread of fire, in the event that one would break out. Many of the original brick homes are still standing, with much of their original integrity. A branch of the Baltimore & Ohio railroad served Boswell and its coal mine. At its economic peak shortly after World War II, Boswell boasted two movie theatres, three department stores, a bank, several jewelry stores, a druggist, two funeral homes, three grocery stores, nearly a dozen restaurants and taverns, a lumber yard, and a weekly newspaper. Earlier, pre-Prohibition, Boswell also housed its own brewery.

Boswell's streets generally run perpendicular to its avenues, in a grid. Many of the avenues in Boswell are named after coal company officials. For example:

- Hower Avenue, after Charles E. Hower, a Surveyor from Johnstown.
- Morris Avenue, after W.H. Morris, a known builder from Johnstown
- Atkinson Way, after W.G. Atkinson, the Vice President of Merchants Coal Company.

At the same time, the borough's street names can provide a geography lesson, following the flow of water from Boswell to the seas, with two exceptions made for streets in the central business district. Street names from north to south are: Quemahoning, Stonycreek, Center (in place of "Conemaugh" for the Conemaugh River), Main (in place of "Kiskiminetas" for the Kiskiminetas River), Allegheny, Ohio, Mississippi, Mexico (for the Gulf of Mexico), Atlantic and Pacific.

The mine, Orenda Mine #1, extracted high quality, semi-bituminous coal. A steam engine hoisted the coal to the surface. The hoist pulled the coal cars up a coal tipple that was 1,080 feet (330 m) long, 92 feet (28 m) high, and 60 feet (18 m) wide. In 1920, this was the largest coal tipple in the world. At its prime, 900 men were employed and over 3,000 tons of coal were mined daily. The company was eventually renamed to the United Coal Company and in 1918 it became the Davis Coal Company.

For most of its history, the mine at Boswell operated without union representation. An early attempt to unionize workers led to an armed riot on January 17, 1904. Seven were wounded and 20 arrested in the melee. A prolonged struggle for unionization, which began at Jerome and Windber in northern Somerset County in early April, 1922, extended to Boswell on April 17. By April 24, 1922, miners at Acosta, Gray, Ralphton, Randolph and Jenners also joined the strike, which was to last sixteen months. (For a more detailed discussion of the strike, see the wiki for Jerome, Pennsylvania.)

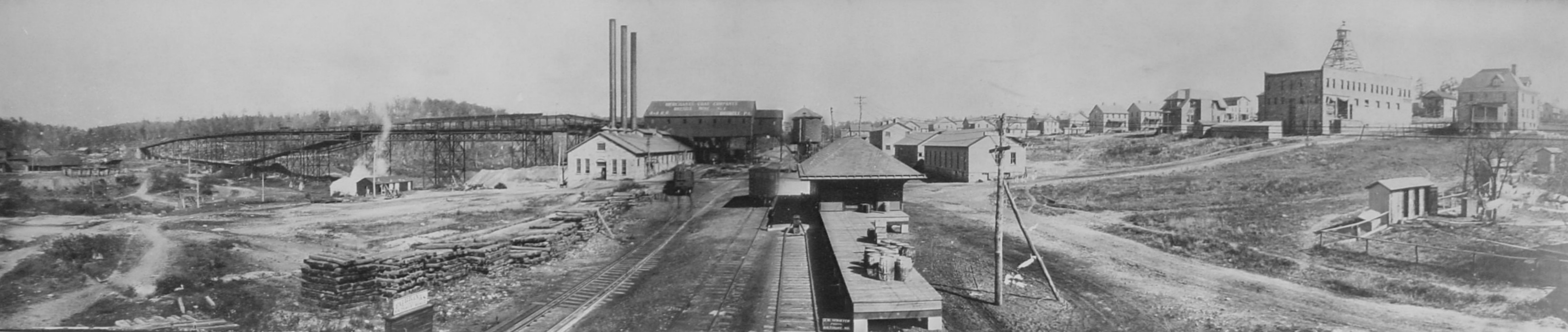
A view of Boswell's mining operation in its prime: The coal tipple can be seen crossing the left side of the photograph. Near the center-left is the steam engine that pulled the cars on the tipple. In the center is the power plant with its three smokestacks. The railroad tracks that ran through town can be seen in the center of the photograph. The foreman's home is seen on the far right of the panorama.

== Mining disasters ==
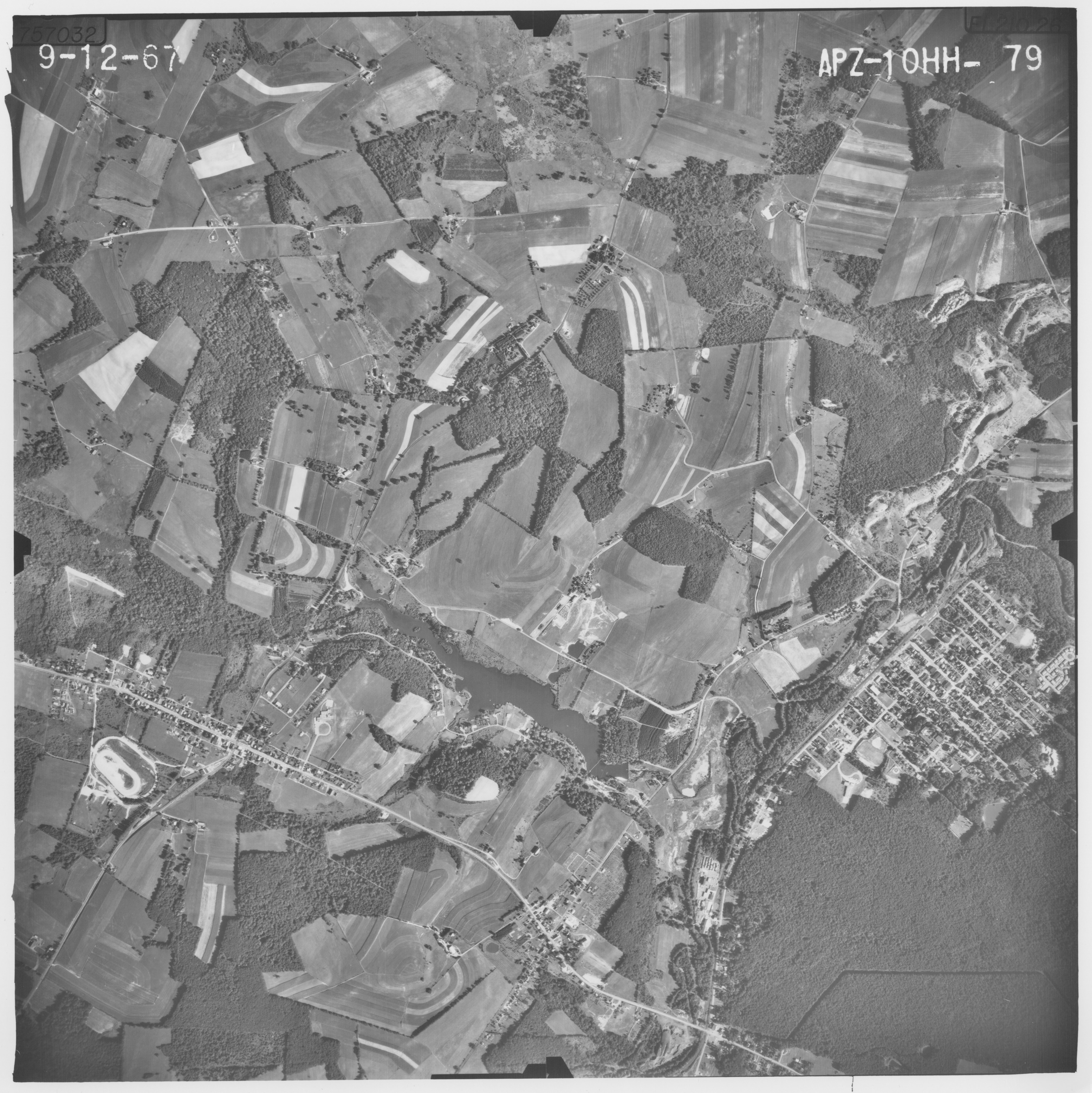
Aerial view of Boswell and vicinity, Sept. 12, 1967.

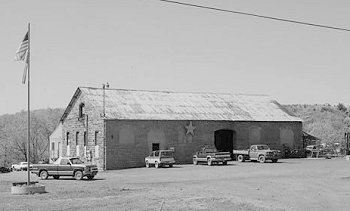
Merchants Coal Company powerhouse at Boswell (1992 photo)

There have been two noteworthy disasters at the Boswell mines. A methane gas explosion killed five miners in 1909 and another explosion in 1915 killed 22 miners.

Mining at Boswell was a problem-plagued effort, according to discussions with local residents from the era. While much archival research remains to be done to corroborate these details, it seems apparent that Merchants Coal, and its parent which was eventually known as Hillman Coal & Coke, miscalculated in the siting of Boswell and its mine. Given the size of Merchant's capital outlay—including construction in Boswell of the world's largest tipple, a central business district and a high school—the company planned big things for Boswell. The town of Jerome appears to have been built as a satellite town, soon to be linked with Boswell, both underground in coal production and on the surface in social and cultural life (the right-of-way for a street car line was acquired between Jerome and Boswell, for instance). However, local miners tell of the "Stone Wall," an unexpected and virtually insurmountable underground geological fault hit midway between Jerome and Boswell that prevented the linking of the two mines at a reasonable cost. Evidence of this fault can be seen on the land surface near Route 601 about two miles (3 km) south of Jerome. (Indeed, when mechanized deep-mining resumed in this area for a time in the late 20th century, the entry shaft was sunk adjacent to this fault, presumably so access could be had to the entire field.) It can be speculated that Hillman had planned to use Boswell as its primary processing facility after the link-up, thus the huge tipple. Hillman also likely planned to make Boswell the center of operations and community life (of evidence, the high school). But the two mines never came together; in fact, Boswell's mine proved to be significantly less productive than Jerome's, as shown by documented production figures from 1927, for example. In that year, Boswell produced 204,592 tons of coal, while Jerome produced 816,568 tons, four times as much.

The Boswell mine closed on March 29, 1939, due to the excessive cost of transporting coal to the surface (the Jerome mine worked until 1954). The Boswell tipple was dismantled in 1940, though some of the tipple's abutments still stand today. After the mine closed a slow economic decline set in. However, many businesses survived well into the 1960s and early 1970s. Railroad freight service to Boswell stopped in the early 1970s. Boswell today is primarily a bedroom community.

In 1970, the high school was rechristened as North Star High School. It is the successor from the earlier Boswell, Jenner Boswell, Jenner-Boswell-Jennerstown, and Forbes High Schools. The high school is approaching its centenary and currently serves the two surrounding townships (Jenner and Quemahoning) and three boroughs (Jennerstown, Stoystown and Hooversville) in addition to Boswell residents.

Orenda Park, a community forest and picnic area, has been established at the site of the former coal tipple. The park is maintained by the Boswell Area Historical Society. The Boswell Historic District was added to the National Register of Historic Places in 1994.

== Environmental impact of mining ==
Drainage from the Boswell mine was a primary source of pollution into Quemahoning Creek, which flows just north of Boswell. A remediation project was completed in 2005, spearheaded by SCRIP (Stonycreek-Conemaugh River Improvement Project), a non-governmental organization, in collaboration with OSM, the Pennsylvania Department of Environmental Protection, the Southern Alleghenies Conservancy, Somerset County Conservation District and Reliant Energy. In addition, the Jenner Rod & Gun Club, a local sportsmen's club, provided significant funds to purchase property for the remediation site.

The discovery of the purple fringeless orchid, an endangered species, within the remediation site complicated the project. The plants were relocated successfully to unimpacted wetlands immediately adjacent to the remediation site in 2004.

The most recent information showed the system is treating between 1,600 and 2,000 gallons of water per minute, removing approximately 80 tons of iron a day from the water. About 3,000 trout were stocked successfully into a four-mile (6 km) section of the Creek downstream from Boswell in 2005, the first time the creek supported a fishery along this stretch in almost 100 years.

== Churches ==
Including:

- All Saints Roman Catholic Church, 325 Quemahoning Street.
- Church of God, Boswell, 623 Main Street.
- Covenant Presbyterian Church, 327 Allegheny Street.
- New Life Church of the Nazarene, 878 Main Street.
- St Andrew Evangelical Lutheran Church, 500 Main Street.
- Saints Peter and Paul Russian Orthodox Church, 308 Quemahoning Street.
