= Berlin Brothersvalley School District =

School district in Pennsylvania

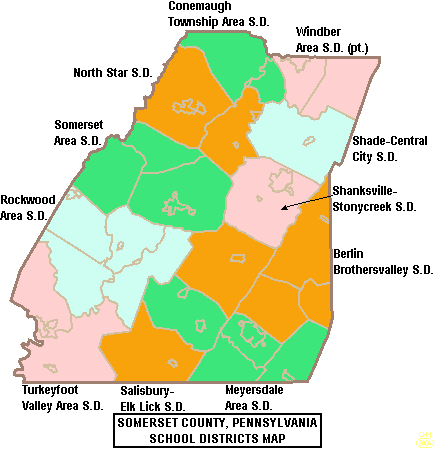

Address
- 1025 Main Street Berlin, Somerset, Pennsylvania, 15530; United States

District information
- Type: Public

Students and staff
- District mascot: Mountaineers
- Colors: Royal Blue and White

Other information
- Website: http://www.bbsd.com/

The Berlin Brothersvalley School District is a school district in Somerset County, Pennsylvania, United States. It covers the Berlin and New Baltimore boroughs. It also covers the following townships: Allegheny, Fairhope, and Northampton, as well as Brothersvalley Township.

The school district consists of three schools all connected by a tunnel. The district encompasses 165.5 square miles. According to a 2006 local census, it serves a resident population of 5,633.

== Schools ==
School	Grade Level	Principal
Berlin-Brothersvalley Elementary School	Grades K-4	Mr. Eric Lauer
Berlin Brothersvalley Middle School	Grades 5–8	Mr. Eric Lauer
Berlin Brothersvalley High School	Grades 9–12	Mr. Jim Maddy
