= Jennerstown, Pennsylvania =

Borough in Pennsylvania, US

- Borough
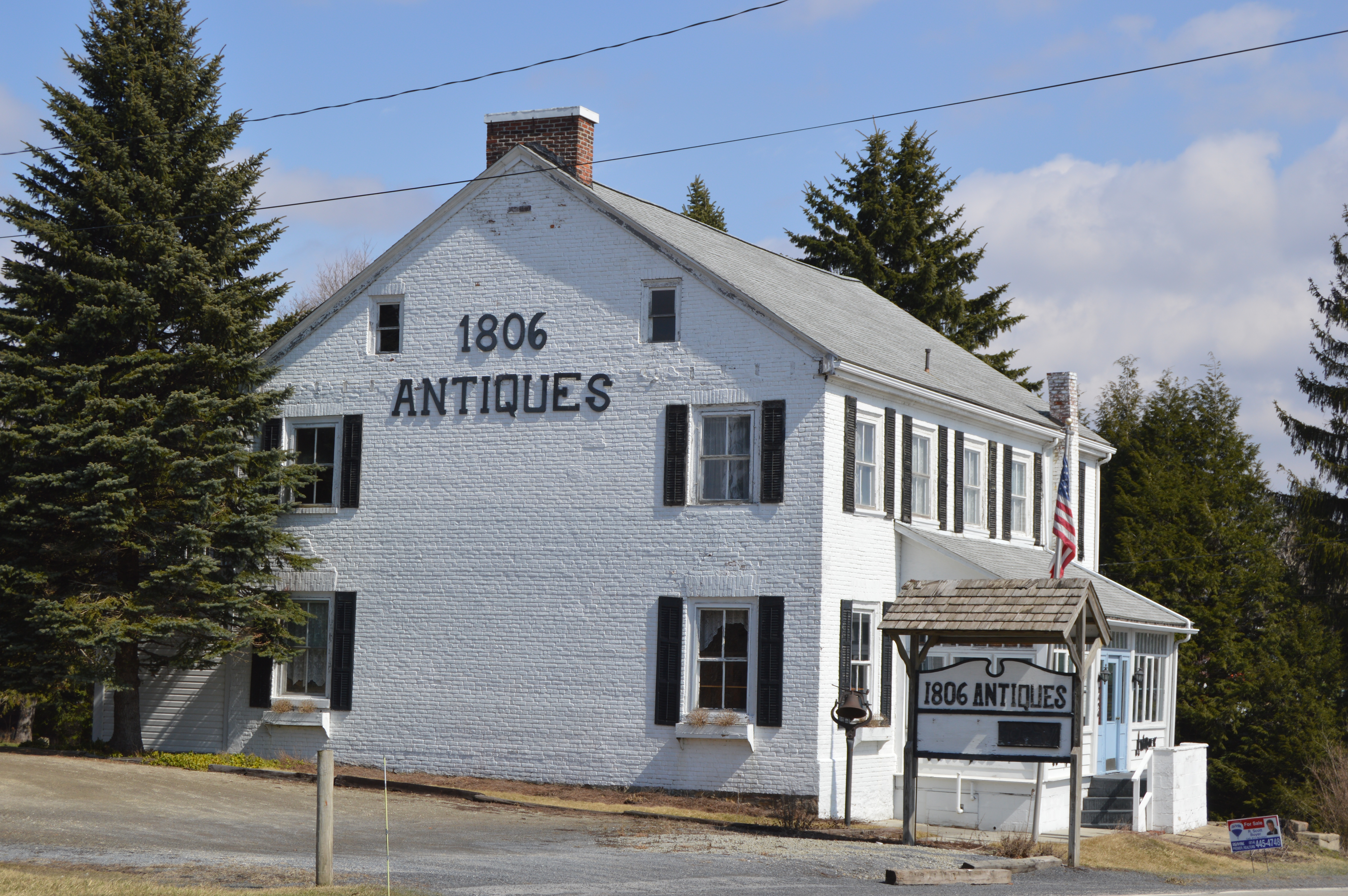
- 1806 tavern on the Pennsylvania Wagon Road

- Location of Jennerstown in Somerset County, Pennsylvania
- Coordinates: 40°09′42″N 79°03′46″W
- Country: United States
- State: Pennsylvania
- County: Somerset
- Settled: 1822
- Incorporated: 1874

Government
  - Type: Borough Council

Area
  - Total: 1.99 sq mi (5.15 km^{2})
  - Land: 1.92 sq mi (4.98 km^{2})
  - Water: 0.066 sq mi (0.17 km^{2})

Population (2020)
  - Total: 678
  - Density: 352.6/sq mi (136.15/km^{2})
- Time zone: UTC-5 (Eastern (EST))
  - Summer (DST): UTC-4 (EDT)
- Zip code: 15547
- Area code: 814
- FIPS code: 42-38048
- Website: www.jennerstownboro.com

Jennerstown is a borough in Somerset County, Pennsylvania, United States. It is part of the Johnstown, Pennsylvania Metropolitan Statistical Area. The population was 679 at the 2020 census. The borough is the home of Jennerstown Speedway. The town was named for Edward Jenner.

Jennerstown is located north of Somerset and south of Johnstown. It is also west of Boswell.

It is connected with Route 30 (Pennsylvania).

== Geography ==
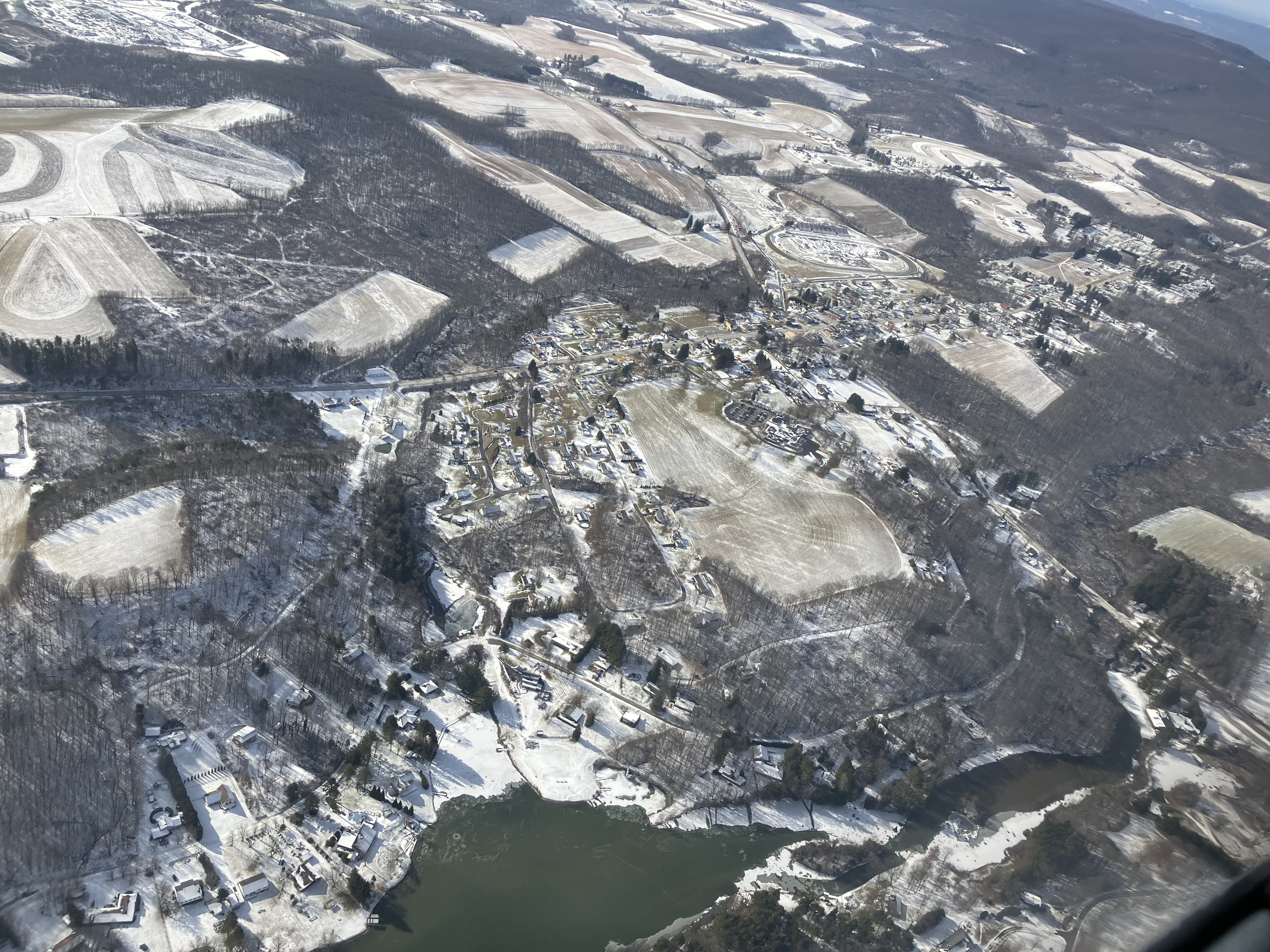
Aerial view in 2024

Jennerstown is located at 40°9′42″N 79°3′46″W (40.161763, -79.062686).

According to the United States Census Bureau, the borough has a total area of 2.0 square miles (5.2 km^{2}), of which 1.9 square miles (4.9 km^{2}) is land and 0.1 square miles (0.26 km^{2}) (3.50%) is water.

== Demographics ==
Historical population
Census	Pop.	Note	%±
1880	106		—
1890	95		−10.4%
1900	96		1.1%
1910	109		13.5%
1920	172		57.8%
1930	252		46.5%
1940	369		46.4%
1950	376		1.9%
1960	422		12.2%
1970	621		47.2%
1980	656		5.6%
1990	635		−3.2%
2000	714		12.4%
2010	695		−2.7%
2020	678		−2.4%
2021 (est.)	677	▼	−0.1%

As of the census of 2000, there were 714 people, 302 households, and 212 families residing in the borough. The population density was 369.4 inhabitants per square mile (142.6/km^{2}). There were 343 housing units at an average density of 177.5 per square mile (68.5/km^{2}). The racial makeup of the borough was 100.00% White.

There were 302 households, out of which 25.8% had children under the age of 18 living with them, 58.9% were married couples living together, 6.6% had a female householder with no husband present, and 29.8% were non-families. 27.2% of all households were made up of individuals, and 13.9% had someone living alone who was 65 years of age or older. The average household size was 2.30 and the average family size was 2.77.

In the borough the population was spread out, with 19.2% under the age of 18, 5.5% from 18 to 24, 27.9% from 25 to 44, 27.7% from 45 to 64, and 19.7% who were 65 years of age or older. The median age was 44 years. For every 100 females there were 97.8 males. For every 100 females age 18 and over, there were 94.3 males.

The median income for a household in the borough was $39,886, and the median income for a family was $46,111. Males had a median income of $28,750 versus $22,273 for females. The per capita income for the borough was $19,540. About 4.2% of families and 5.3% of the population were below the poverty line, including 2.8% of those under age 18 and 9.4% of those age 65 or over.

== History ==
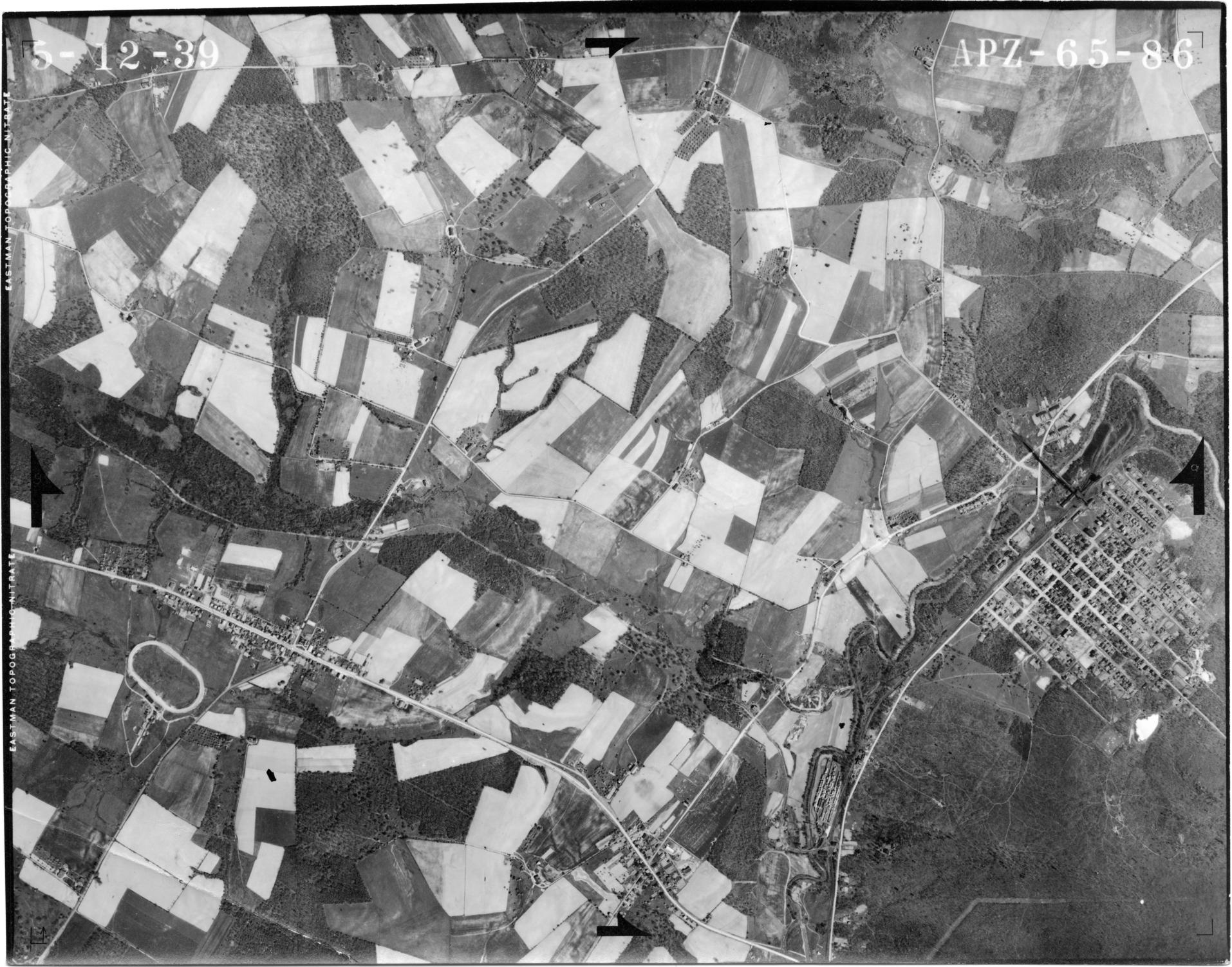
Aerial view of Jennerstown and vicinity, May 12, 1939. Notice that Stoughton Lake has yet to be built, its future location near the photo's center. The Jennerstown Speedway is visibly clearly at lower left.

Jennerstown was first settled in the late 18th century as a stage coach stop on the Forbes Road, one of the first roads constructed by English-speaking settlers over the Allegheny Mountains. The town, originally named Laurel Hill, was later renamed Jennerville in honor of Dr. Edward Jenner, discoverer of the smallpox vaccine. Later, Jennerville became Jennerstown. The town and vicinity boast several buildings about 200 years old, which is not common in the surrounding area.

Throughout its history, Jennerstown has served primarily as a wayside for travelers and as a farming community. Its post office was established in 1832, initially under the name of Laurel Hill. The village contained seven or eight houses, a store and a tavern at that time. Jennerstown incorporated as a borough in 1874. Jennerstown has never been a large town, and its current population represents a peak.

Jennerstown is home to the Mountain Playhouse, one of the oldest venues for summer stock theatre in the United States. The Mountain Playhouse has maintained a full schedule of live theatre productions nightly from May through October each year for the last seventy-seven years.

Jennerstown Speedway is a popular summer destination for stock car racing.
