= Hooversville, Pennsylvania =

Borough in Pennsylvania, US

- Borough
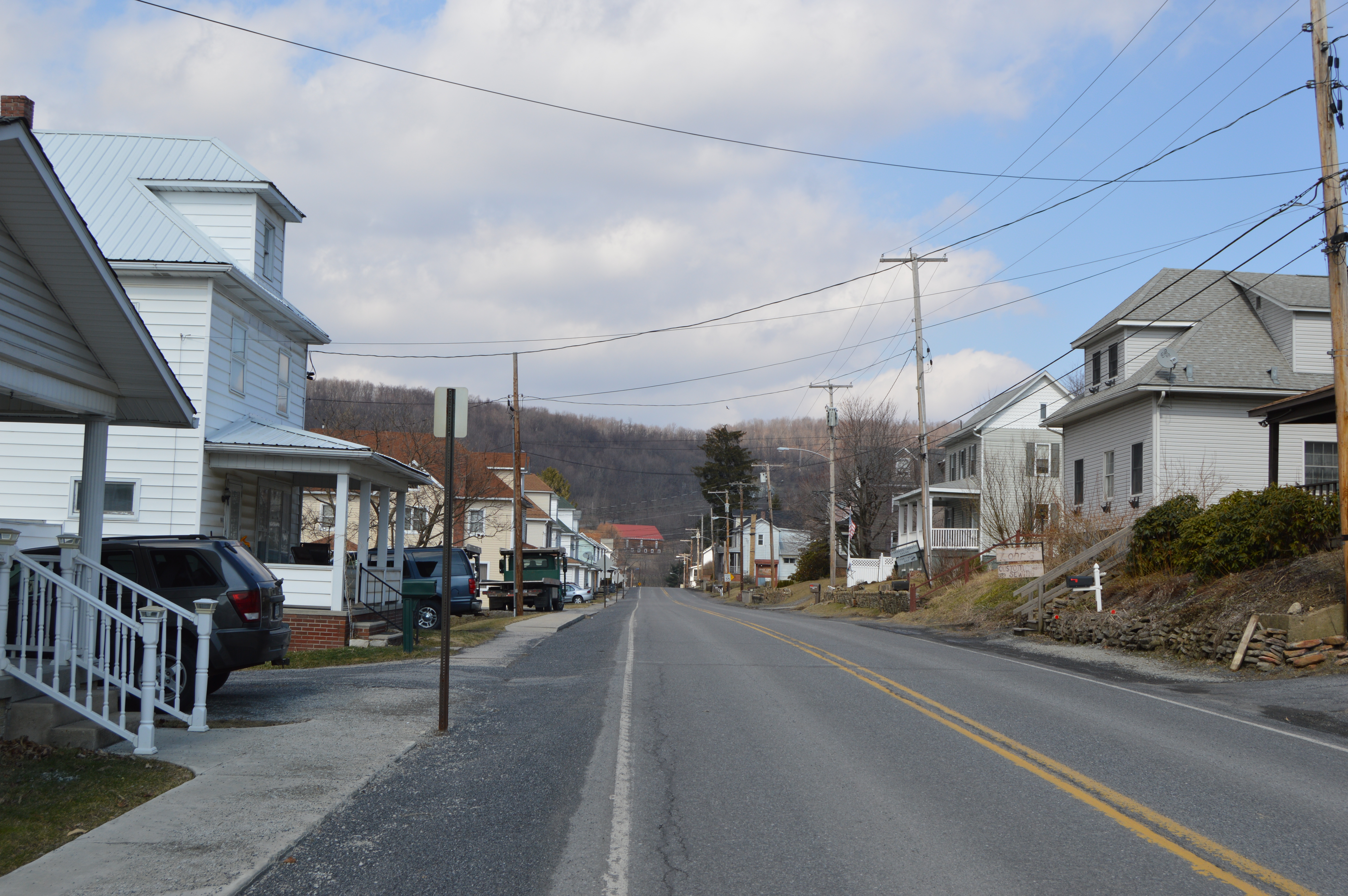
- Houses on Barn Street

- Location of Hooversville in Somerset County, Pennsylvania.

- Location within Pennsylvania
- Coordinates: 40°08′57″N 78°54′51″W
- Country: United States
- State: Pennsylvania
- County: Somerset
- Settled: 1836
- Incorporated: 1896

Government
  - Type: Borough Council

Area
  - Total: 0.61 sq mi (1.58 km^{2})
  - Land: 0.61 sq mi (1.58 km^{2})
  - Water: 0 sq mi (0.00 km^{2})

Population (2020)
  - Total: 628
  - Density: 1,028.5/sq mi (397.12/km^{2})
- Time zone: UTC-5 (Eastern (EST))
  - Summer (DST): UTC-4 (EDT)
- Zip code: 15936
- Area code: 814
- FIPS code: 42-35608
- Website: http://hooversvilleborough.com/

Hooversville is a borough in Somerset County, Pennsylvania, United States. It is part of the Johnstown, Pennsylvania, Metropolitan Statistical Area. The population was 626 at the 2020 census.

== History ==
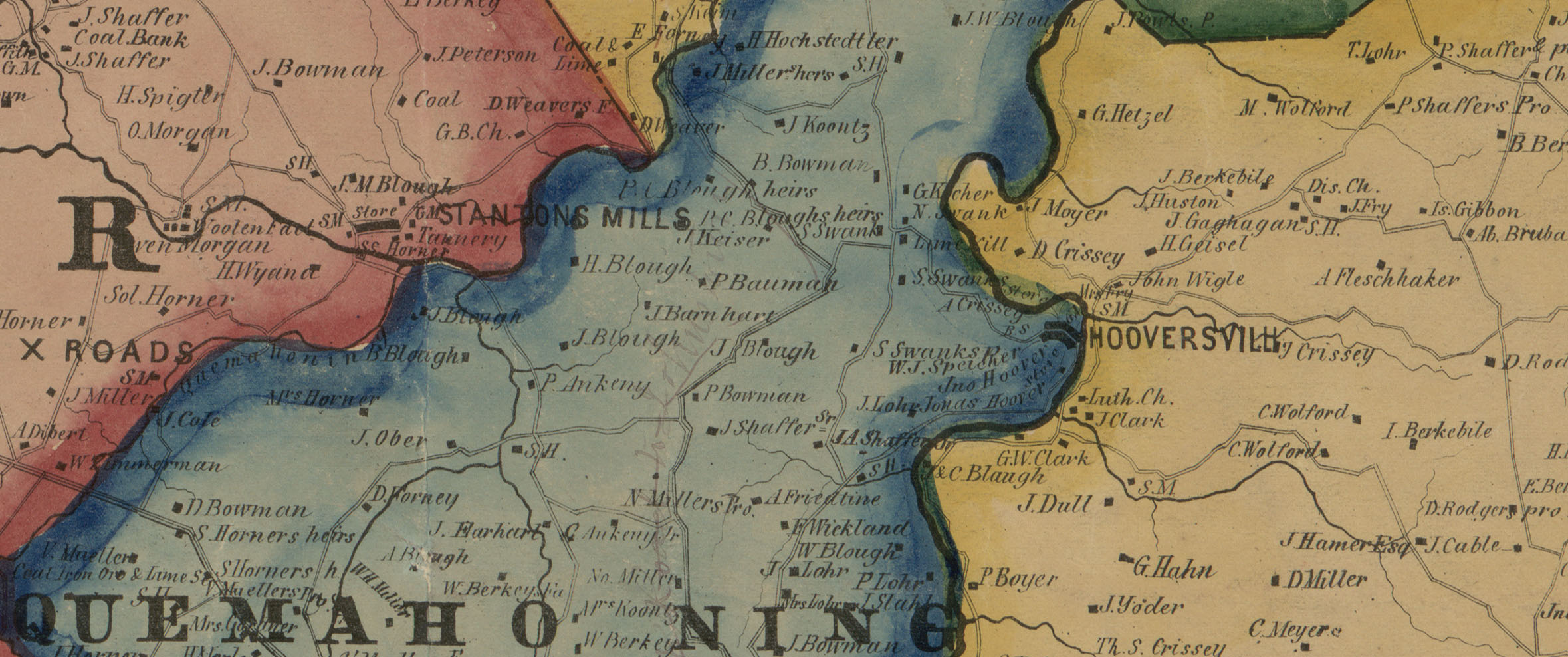
Hooversville, Somerset County, Pennsylvania, 1860

Hooversville was established in 1836. The first settlers to claim land in the Hooversville area were George Lohr (1780), Michael Kocher, and Casper Ripple (warrant 1794), who died in 1828. Jonas Hoover, the founder of Hooversville, came to Quemahoning Township in 1834 and bought land from the heirs of Casper Ripple. In 1836, he had lots surveyed along the present Water and Main Streets. Jonas Hoover was a farmer who ran a gristmill and sawmill on Hoover Street in 1847. He was a justice of the peace from 1852 to 1862. He and David Crissey took part in establishing the German Reformed Church at Hooversville.

This town, like many in the area, is primarily residential. There were also locally owned gas stations/garages on Route 403 in town, but all have now closed.

== Geography ==
Hooversville is located at 40°8′57″N 78°54′51″W (40.149267, -78.914062). According to the United States Census Bureau, the borough has a total area of 0.7 square miles (1.8 km^{2}), all land. Hooversville sits on the eastern edge of Quemahoning Township, along its border with Shade Township.

Pennsylvania Route 403 runs through Hooversville and serves as the main road through the borough. U.S. Route 30 is five miles to the south via Route 403 as well.

== Demographics ==
Historical population
| Census | Pop. | Note | %± |
|---|---|---|---|
| 1900 | 465 | | — |
| 1910 | 990 | | 112.9% |
| 1920 | 1,345 | | 35.9% |
| 1930 | 1,448 | | 7.7% |
| 1940 | 1,364 | | −5.8% |
| 1950 | 1,240 | | −9.1% |
| 1960 | 1,120 | | −9.7% |
| 1970 | 962 | | −14.1% |
| 1980 | 863 | | −10.3% |
| 1990 | 731 | | −15.3% |
| 2000 | 779 | | 6.6% |
| 2010 | 645 | | −17.2% |
| 2020 | 628 | | −2.6% |
| 2021 (est.) | 620 | ▼ | −1.3% |

As of the census of 2000, there were 779 people, 335 households, and 213 families residing in the borough. The population density was 1,186.2 inhabitants per square mile (458.0/km^{2}). There were 364 housing units at an average density of 554.3 per square mile (214.0/km^{2}). The racial makeup of the borough was 98.84% White, 0.26% African American, 0.13% Native American, and 0.77% from two or more races. Hispanic or Latino of any race were 0.13% of the population.

There were 335 households, out of which 25.7% had children under the age of 18 living with them, 48.4% were married couples living together, 10.4% had a female householder with no husband present, and 36.4% were non-families. 33.7% of all households were made up of individuals, and 17.9% had someone living alone who was 65 years of age or older. The average household size was 2.33 and the average family size was 2.97.

In the borough the population was spread out, with 23.1% under the age of 18, 5.3% from 18 to 24, 28.9% from 25 to 44, 23.4% from 45 to 64, and 19.4% who were 65 years of age or older. The median age was 40 years. For every 100 females there were 92.8 males. For every 100 females age 18 and over, there were 93.9 males.

The median income for a household in the borough was $27,578, and the median income for a family was $34,375. Males had a median income of $25,500 versus $21,597 for females. The per capita income for the borough was $13,298. About 10.1% of families and 12.8% of the population were below the poverty line, including 16.4% of those under age 18 and 12.5% of those age 65 or over.
