= Central City, Pennsylvania =

Borough in Pennsylvania, US

- Borough
- Location of Central City in Somerset County, Pennsylvania.

- Location within Pennsylvania Location within the United States
- Coordinates: 40°06′33″N 78°48′15″W
- Country: United States
- State: Pennsylvania
- County: Somerset
- Settled: 1848
- Incorporated: May 6, 1918

Government
  - Type: Borough Council

Area
  - Total: 0.54 sq mi (1.40 km^{2})
  - Land: 0.54 sq mi (1.40 km^{2})
  - Water: 0 sq mi (0.00 km^{2})
- Elevation: 2,200 ft (670 m)

Population (2020)
  - Total: 998
  - Density: 1,848.7/sq mi (713.78/km^{2})
- Time zone: UTC-5 (Eastern (EST))
  - Summer (DST): UTC-4 (EDT)
- ZIP code: 15926
- Area code: 814
- FIPS code: 42-12296

Central City is a borough in Somerset County, Pennsylvania, United States. The population was 998 at the 2020 census. It is part of the Johnstown, Pennsylvania, Metropolitan Statistical Area. It is east-northeast of Stoystown and northeast of Somerset.

== Geography ==
Central City is at 40°6′33″N 78°48′15″W (40.109094, -78.804121).

According to the United States Census Bureau, the borough has a total area of 0.5 square miles (1.3 km^{2}), all land.

The actual center of Pennsylvania is in Centre County.

Central City has the eighth-highest elevation of towns in Pennsylvania, at 2,200 feet (670 m).

== History ==
Central City is situated on lands originally owned by Shade Township's first settlers, Casper Stotler and George Lambert. It was founded in 1894 by Anthony Wechtenhiser and received its name from its central location along the projected Midland Railroad. The objective was to build a railroad into the large coal field known to exist in this region. The projected railroad, under a preliminary survey made in 1894, would have extended the road southeastward along Dark Shade Creek and Shingle Run valleys, across the mountain by way of Frazier's Gap, into Bedford County and eastward to the Atlantic seaboard; however, the project failed to develop. In 1913, an extension to the town was laid out by the Cook and Neasley Realty Company on lands then owned by John Wechtenhiser and Obadiah Lohr. The town was incorporated into the borough of Central City in 1918.

Initially, there were major plans for the town of Central City. In 1921, Central City became a charter bank (Charter # 11967) to the Federal Reserve Bank of Cleveland. It ceased printing currency in 1935. This bank, located on Sunshine Ave<<Google Maps>>, printed over a half a million dollars' worth of national currency during its existence. The inhabitants of Central City borough and the surrounding area are served by nine churches, sixteen stores, one hotel, five garages and service stations, three barber shops, a printing house, a photo studio, two funeral homes, a greenhouse, two veterans' organizations-American Legion and Veterans of Foreign Wars, and one financial institution.

The Central City Volunteer Fire Company provides fire protection for both the borough and the surrounding area. The Central City post office was established in 1919, with Joseph Lohr as the first postmaster. A new post office building was erected in 1962. Free mail service was established in the borough in 1955. Free public recreation facilities are owned by the borough, such as a tennis court, baseball field, and a well-maintained park. The Municipal Building, owned by the borough, contains a mayor's office, an office for the chief of police, a council chamber, a large community hall, and a prison room. It also houses the equipment of the fire company.

== Demographics ==
Historical population
Census	Pop.	Note	%±
1920	1,051		—
1930	2,107		100.5%
1940	2,083		−1.1%
1950	1,935		−7.1%
1960	1,604		−17.1%
1970	1,547		−3.6%
1980	1,496		−3.3%
1990	1,246		−16.7%
2000	1,258		1.0%
2010	1,124		−10.7%
2020	998		−11.2%
2021 (est.)	989	▼	−0.9%

As of the census of 2000, there were 1,258 people, 538 households, and 362 families residing in the borough. The population density was 2,325.6 inhabitants per square mile (897.9/km^{2}). There were 595 housing units at an average density of 1,099.9 per square mile (424.7/km^{2}). The racial makeup of the borough was 99.36% White, 0.08% African American, 0.16% Asian, 0.08% from other races, and 0.32% from two or more races. Hispanic or Latino of any race were 0.08% of the population.

There were 538 households, out of which 27.0% had children under the age of 18 living with them, 55.0% were married couples living together, 7.4% had a female householder with no husband present, and 32.7% were non-families. 30.1% of all households were made up of individuals, and 19.1% had someone living alone who was 65 years of age or older. The average household size was 2.34 and the average family size was 2.90.

In the borough the population was spread out, with 21.6% under the age of 18, 8.0% from 18 to 24, 25.0% from 25 to 44, 23.1% from 45 to 64, and 22.3% who were 65 years of age or older. The median age was 42 years. For every 100 females there were 90.0 males. For every 100 females age 18 and over, there were 89.3 males.

The median income for a household in the borough was $26,581, and the median income for a family was $32,455. Males had a median income of $26,700 versus $17,833 for females. The per capita income for the borough was $13,263. About 8.2% of families and 11.1% of the population were below the poverty line, including 17.3% of those under age 18 and 5.0% of those age 65 or over.
