= Somerset County, Pennsylvania =

County in Pennsylvania, United States

- County
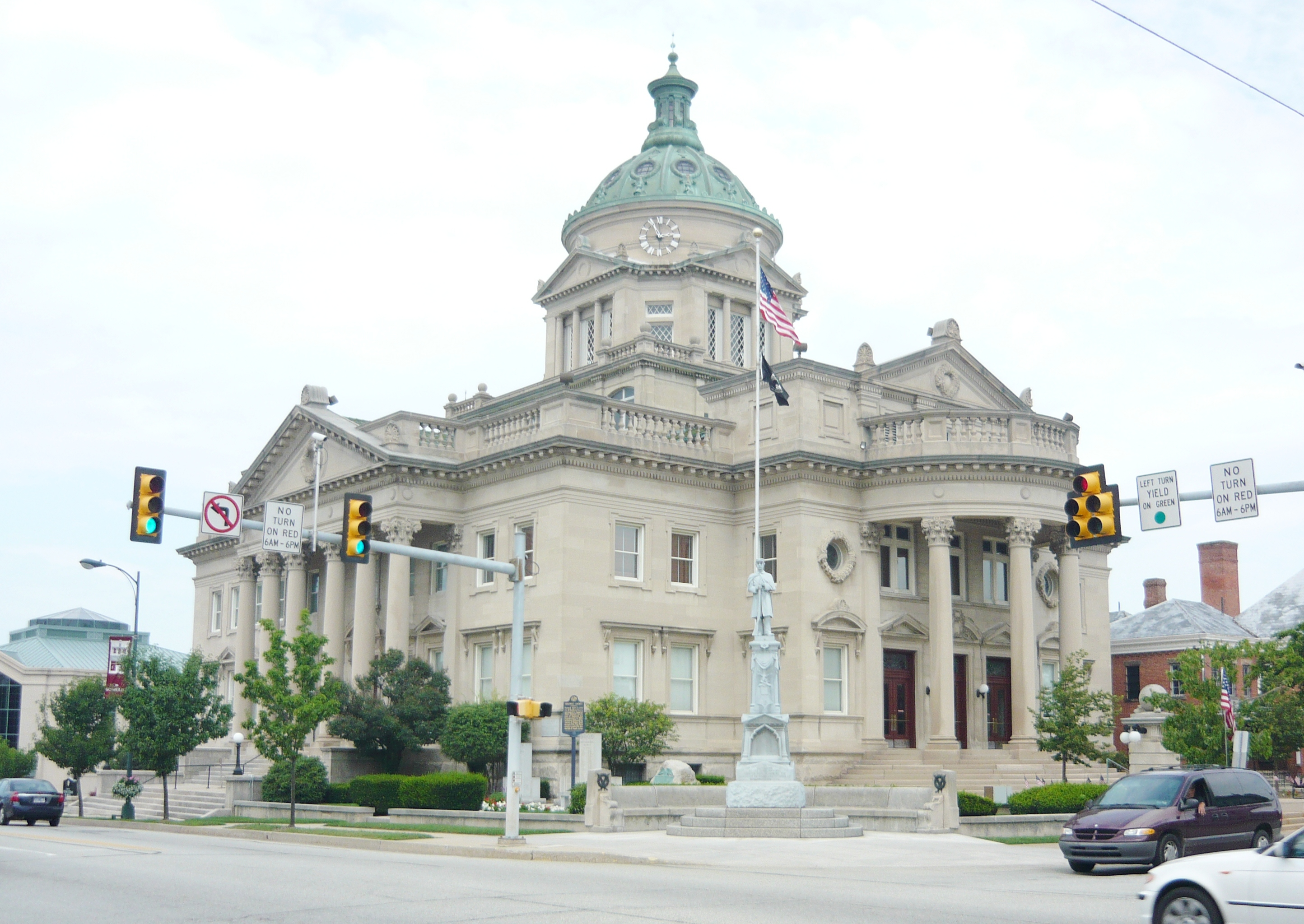
- Somerset County Courthouse

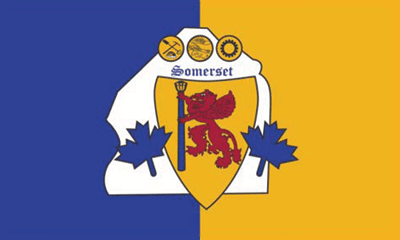
- Flag Seal

- Location within the U.S. state of Pennsylvania
- Coordinates: 39°58′N 79°02′W
- Country: United States
- State: Pennsylvania
- Founded: April 17, 1795
- Named for: Somerset
- Seat: Somerset
- Largest borough: Somerset

Area
  - Total: 1,081 sq mi (2,800 km^{2})
  - Land: 1,074 sq mi (2,780 km^{2})
  - Water: 6.6 sq mi (17 km^{2}) 0.6%

Population (2020)
  - Total: 74,129
  - Estimate (2025): 72,004 ▼
  - Density: 67/sq mi (26/km^{2})
- Time zone: UTC−5 (Eastern)
  - Summer (DST): UTC−4 (EDT)
- Congressional districts: 13th, 14th
- Website: www.co.somerset.pa.us

Somerset County is a county in the US state of Pennsylvania. As of the 2020 census, the population was 74,129. Its county seat is Somerset. The county was created from part of Bedford County on April 17, 1795, and named after the county of Somerset in England. The county is part of the Southwest Pennsylvania region of the state. (Note: Includes Westmoreland, Cambria, Fayette, Blair, Indiana, Somerset, Bedford, Huntingdon, Greene and Fulton Counties)

Somerset County comprises the Somerset, PA micropolitan statistical area, which is included in the Johnstown–Somerset, PA combined statistical area.

The county is famous for being the crash site of United Airlines Flight 93, one of the four flights involved in the September 11 attacks, which crashed near the village of Shanksville after the flight's passengers struggled with Al-Qaeda hijackers for control of the plane, which terrorists intended to fly likely into either the U.S. Capitol or the White House.

The Somerset County Amish community is the second oldest Amish community in the world that still exists, established in 1772. It is located in the South of the county around Meyersdale and Springs.

== History ==
=== Founding ===
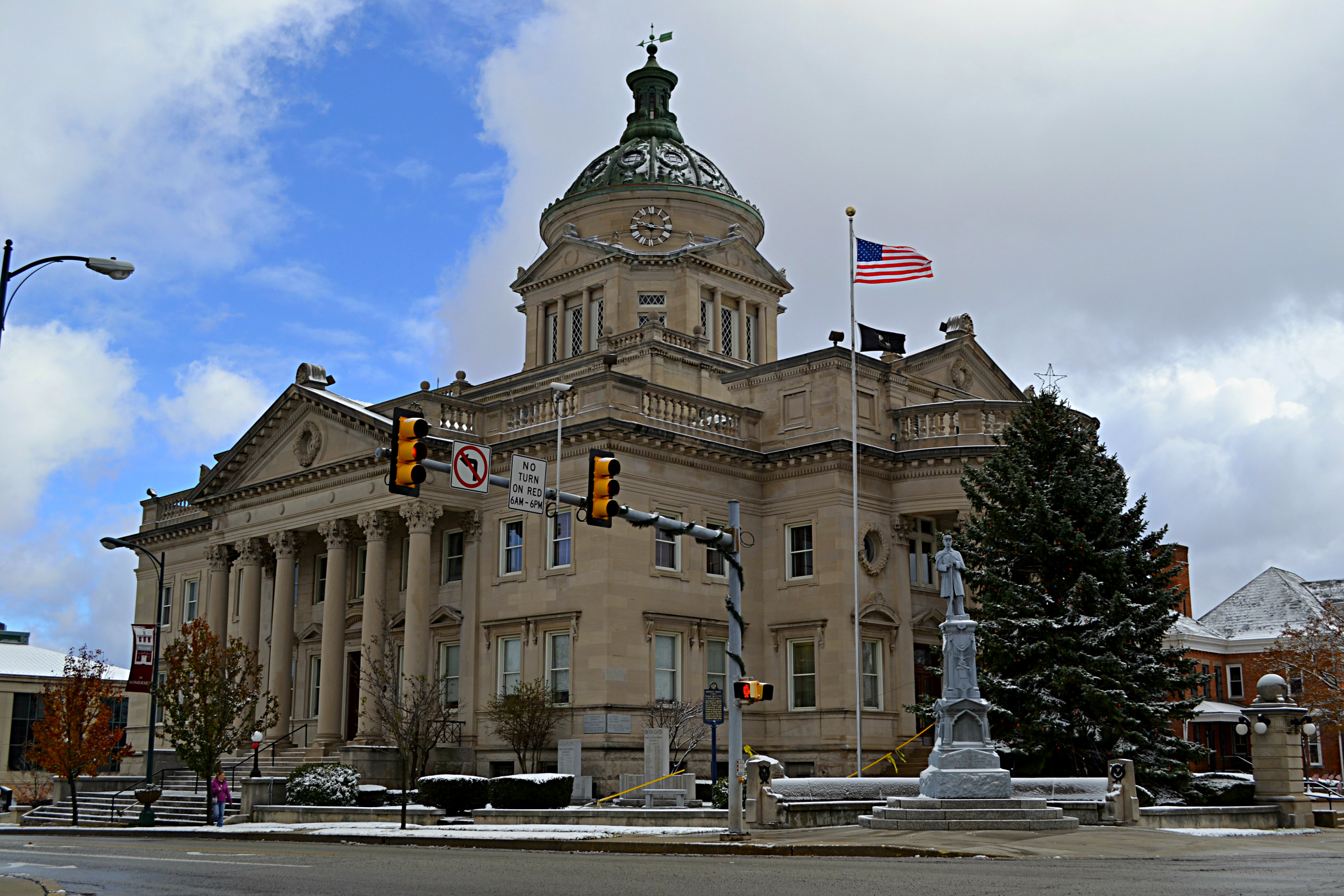
Somerset County Courthouse

Southwestern Pennsylvania began as a large area called Cumberland County. As population increased, the area was split into smaller counties. Bedford County was formed from part from Cumberland in 1771 and is referred to as "Old Bedford County" and contained what became 20 smaller counties. In 1773 part of Bedford County was split off to form Westmoreland County. In 1787 Bedford County was split in half with the northern part becoming Huntingdon County and the southern part remained as a smaller Bedford County. Somerset County was split off from the western part of Bedford County on April 17, 1795, and the new county's name was taken from Somerset, England. In 1804 the northern half of Somerset County was split off to form Cambria County. No further splits from Somerset County have occurred since 1804.

=== Colonial era ===
George Washington passed through the area of Somerset County on a scouting expedition in late 1753, just before the outbreak of the French and Indian War. The Forbes Road was cut through Somerset County several years later. This 200-mile stretch from Carlisle to what is now Pittsburgh was created by Brigadier General John Forbes in the British Expedition of 1758 to capture the French Fort Duquesne. Forbes Road was one of two great western land routes cut through the wilderness to create supply lines from the east. It was later the primary route of pioneers travelling to the Ohio Country.

Fur trappers and hunters were first to stay in the region. The earliest permanent white settlement in what is now Somerset County is a region known as Turkeyfoot. People of "The Jersey Settlement" emigrated from Essex and Morris Counties, New Jersey, about 1770.

=== United Airlines Flight 93 ===
Somerset County gained worldwide attention in 2001 when a hijacked airliner, United Airlines Flight 93, crashed in Stonycreek Township, near the town of Shanksville as part of the September 11 attacks. The first confirmed report of the plane's crash came from Somerset County Airport as reported on NBC's The Today Show. The most likely target of this flight was the U.S. Capitol in Washington, D.C. Flight 93's cockpit voice recorder revealed crew and passengers tried to seize control of the plane from the hijackers after learning through phone calls that Flights 11, 77, and 175 had been crashed into buildings that morning. Once it became evident that the passengers might gain control, the hijackers rolled the plane and intentionally crashed it. Their actions were honored and the crash site, which is the final resting place of the passengers and crew, is now protected as part of the Flight 93 National Memorial, under the care of the National Park System. The USS Somerset, a U.S. Navy warship, was named in commemoration of the Flight 93 tragedy.

In July 2002, Somerset County again made worldwide news when nine coal miners were rescued from several hundred feet underground at the Quecreek mine after an intense multi-day struggle.

== Geography ==
According to the U.S. Census Bureau, the county has a total area of 1,081 square miles (2,800 km^{2}), of which 1,074 square miles (2,780 km^{2}) is land and 6.6 square miles (17 km^{2}) (0.6%) is water. Somerset County is one of the far southern counties of Pennsylvania, along its straight southern edge. The county borders Garrett and Allegany Counties in Maryland, and the Pennsylvania counties of Fayette, Westmoreland, Cambria, and Bedford. Somerset County is one of the 423 counties served by the Appalachian Regional Commission, and it is identified as part of "Greater Appalachia" by Colin Woodard in his book American Nations: A History of the Eleven Rival Regional Cultures of North America.

=== Climate ===
Somerset County along with Garrett County is one of the snowiest inhabited locations in the United States, with the highest elevations of the county averaging 150+ inches of snow each winter. The county's elevation and general proximity to both the Great Lakes and the Atlantic Ocean causes snow from both Nor'easters and lake effect upslope snow events to fall from late October through early April. Snow has been recorded in Somerset County in every month except July, although local lore has it that even July saw snow in 1816, "the year without a summer." Mount Davis, the highest natural point in the state of Pennsylvania at 3,213 feet (979 m), is located in the southern part of the county.

The county has a warm-summer humid continental climate (Dfb) and average monthly temperatures in Somerset borough range from 24.5 °F in January to 67.1 °F in July.

=== Adjacent counties ===
- Cambria County (north)
- Bedford County (east)
- Allegany County, Maryland (southeast)
- Garrett County, Maryland (southwest)
- Fayette County (west)
- Westmoreland County (northwest)

=== National protected area ===
- Flight 93 National Memorial

=== State protected areas ===
- Kooser State Park
- Laurel Hill State Park
- Laurel Mountain State Park
- Laurel Ridge State Park

== Geology ==
Somerset County is situated along the eastern border of the Allegheny Plateau physiographic province, which is characterized by gently folded to flat-lying sedimentary rocks of middle to late Paleozoic age. The eastern border of the county is approximately at the Allegheny Front, a geological boundary between the Allegheny Plateau and the Ridge and Valley Province (characterized by folded and faulted sedimentary rocks of early to middle Paleozoic age).

The stratigraphic record of sedimentary rocks within the county spans from the Devonian Scherr Formation to the Pennsylvanian Monongahela Formation. Most of these rocks are clastics (conglomerate, sandstone, shale), and there is little or no limestone exposed at the surface. No igneous or metamorphic rocks of any kind exist within the county.

Structurally, Somerset County has many gentle folds, the axes of which trend roughly north-northeast. Synclines include the Youghiogheny Syncline, New Lexington/Johnstown Syncline, Somerset Syncline, Berlin Syncline, and Wellersburg Syncline (called the George's Creek Syncline in Maryland). The southern end of Wilmore Syncline is at the town of Windber. Anticlines include the Laurel Hill Anticline, Centerville Dome, Boswell Dome, Negro Mountain Anticline, and an unnamed anticline between the Berlin and Wellersburg Synclines.

The primary mountains within the county are (from west to east) Laurel Hill (which forms part of the western border), Negro Mountain, Meadow Mountain, Savage Mountain, and Allegheny Mountain. Negro Mountain also includes Mount Davis, the highest peak in Pennsylvania. Each mountain trends northeast.

All of Somerset County lies far to the south of the terminal moraine, and thus it was never glaciated. However, during the Pleistocene epoch (the Ice Age), periglacial processes dominated. Most of the county was most likely a tundra during the Pleistocene. Patterned ground typical of tundra is still visible at Mount Davis, although it is somewhat obscured by vegetation.

The main drainages in southwestern Somerset county are the Casselman River and Laurel Hill Creek which flow into the Youghiogheny River along the southwest border. In the northwest, Stonycreek River, Shade Creek, and Quemahoning Creek (which flows into the Quemahoning Reservoir) are tributaries of the Conemaugh River. All these drainages are part of the Mississippi River Watershed. In the southeast, Wills Creek flows east into Bedford County and then into Maryland where it joins the Potomac River. Also, the headwaters of the Raystown Branch of the Juniata River are to the east of the town of Somerset. Both the Potomac and Juniata rivers are part of the Chesapeake Bay Watershed.

Coal fields exist within Somerset County. The coal is entirely bituminous, and much of it has been mined or is being mined by Strip mining. Most of the coal is within the Main Bituminous Field, which stretched north and west to adjacent counties and southward into Maryland and West Virginia. The rest is within the Georges Creek Field.

There are many abandoned mines in the county, and acid mine drainage is an environmental problem in many areas. Fishless streams exist as a result of the discharge from the abandoned mines. These include parts of the Casselman River, Shade Creek, Stonycreek River, and Quemahoning Creek, as well as many of their tributaries.

There are many small, deep natural gas fields in the northwestern part of the county.

== Demographics ==
Historical population
Census	Pop.	Note	%±
1800	10,188		—
1810	11,284		10.8%
1820	13,974		23.8%
1830	17,762		27.1%
1840	19,650		10.6%
1850	24,416		24.3%
1860	26,778		9.7%
1870	28,226		5.4%
1880	33,110		17.3%
1890	37,317		12.7%
1900	49,461		32.5%
1910	67,717		36.9%
1920	82,112		21.3%
1930	80,764		−1.6%
1940	84,957		5.2%
1950	81,813		−3.7%
1960	77,450		−5.3%
1970	76,037		−1.8%
1980	81,243		6.8%
1990	78,218		−3.7%
2000	80,023		2.3%
2010	77,742		−2.9%
2020	74,129		−4.6%
2025 (est.)	72,004	▼	−2.9%
U.S. Decennial Census; 1790–1960 1900–1990; 1990–2000 2010–2017 2010-2020

=== 2020 census ===
As of the 2020 census, the county had a population of 74,129. The median age was 47.0 years. 18.1% of residents were under the age of 18 and 23.5% of residents were 65 years of age or older. For every 100 females there were 108.8 males, and for every 100 females age 18 and over there were 109.4 males age 18 and over.

The racial makeup of the county was 93.5% White, 2.5% Black or African American, 0.1% American Indian and Alaska Native, 0.3% Asian, <0.1% Native Hawaiian and Pacific Islander, 0.8% from some other race, and 2.9% from two or more races. Hispanic or Latino residents of any race comprised 1.4% of the population.

22.4% of residents lived in urban areas, while 77.6% lived in rural areas.

There were 30,208 households in the county, of which 23.4% had children under the age of 18 living in them. Of all households, 51.2% were married-couple households, 18.6% were households with a male householder and no spouse or partner present, and 24.0% were households with a female householder and no spouse or partner present. About 30.1% of all households were made up of individuals and 15.7% had someone living alone who was 65 years of age or older.

There were 37,713 housing units, of which 19.9% were vacant. Among occupied housing units, 76.4% were owner-occupied and 23.6% were renter-occupied. The homeowner vacancy rate was 1.4% and the rental vacancy rate was 9.4%.

Somerset County, Pennsylvania – Racial and ethnic composition Note: the US Census treats Hispanic/Latino as an ethnic category. This table excludes Latinos from the racial categories and assigns them to a separate category. Hispanics/Latinos may be of any race.
Race / Ethnicity (NH = Non-Hispanic)	Pop 2000	Pop 2010	Pop 2020	% 2000	% 2010	% 2020
White alone (NH)	77,736	74,265	69,044	97.14%	95.52%	93.14%
Black or African American alone (NH)	1,268	1,856	1,863	1.58%	2.38%	2.51%
Native American or Alaska Native alone (NH)	63	76	50	0.07%	0.09%	0.06%
Asian alone (NH)	172	238	194	0.21%	0.30%	0.26%
Pacific Islander alone (NH)	6	16	7	0.00%	0.02%	0.00%
Other race alone (NH)	5	11	126	0.00%	0.01%	0.16%
Mixed race or Multiracial (NH)	241	440	1,808	0.30%	0.56%	2.43%
Hispanic or Latino (any race)	532	840	1,037	0.66%	1.08%	1.39%
Total	80,023	77,742	74,129	100.00%	100.00%	100.00%

=== 2000 census ===
As of the census of 2000, there were 80,023 people, 31,222 households, and 22,042 families residing in the county. The population density was 74 people per square mile (29 people/km^{2}). There were 37,163 housing units at an average density of 35 units per square mile (14/km^{2}). The racial makeup of the county was 97.39% White, 1.59% Black or African American, 0.08% Native American, 0.21% Asian, 0.01% Pacific Islander, 0.31% from other races, and 0.40% from two or more races. 0.66% of the population were Hispanic or Latino of any race. 41.5% were of German, 10.4% American, 7.4% Italian, 6.4% Irish, 6.4% Polish and 5.8% English ancestry.

There were 31,222 households, out of which 29.40% had children under the age of 18 living with them, 58.30% were married couples living together, 8.50% had a female householder with no husband present, and 29.40% were non-families. 26.10% of all households were made up of individuals, and 13.60% had someone living alone who was 65 years of age or older. The average household size was 2.45 and the average family size was 2.95.

In the county, the population was spread out, with 22.30% under the age of 18, 7.60% from 18 to 24, 27.80% from 25 to 44, 24.30% from 45 to 64, and 18.00% who were 65 years of age or older. The median age was 40 years. For every 100 females there were 99.80 males. For every 100 females age 18 and over, there were 98.90 males.

== Micropolitan statistical area ==
Map of the Johnstown-Somerset, PA Combined Statistical Area (CSA), composed of the following parts: Johnstown, PA Metropolitan Statistical Area Somerset, PA Micropolitan Statistical Area

The U.S. Office of Management and Budget has designated Somerset County as the Somerset, PA Micropolitan Statistical Area (MSA). As of the 2010 U.S. census the micropolitan area ranked 7th most populous in the State of Pennsylvania and the 77th most populous in the United States with a population of 77,742. Somerset County is also a part of the Johnstown-Somerset, PA Combined Statistical Area (CSA), which combines the population of both Somerset County and the Cambria County areas. The combined statistical area ranked 10th in the State of Pennsylvania and 130th most populous in the United States with a population of 221,421.

== Government and politics ==
United States presidential election results for Somerset County, Pennsylvania
Year	Republican		Democratic		Third party(ies)	
Year	No.	%	No.	%	No.	%
1888	4,825	65.36%	2,319	31.41%	238	3.22%
1892	4,670	65.00%	2,262	31.48%	253	3.52%
1896	5,861	70.45%	2,295	27.59%	163	1.96%
1900	6,677	73.30%	2,151	23.61%	281	3.08%
1904	6,772	72.37%	1,686	18.02%	900	9.62%
1908	6,478	68.23%	2,246	23.65%	771	8.12%
1912	1,428	14.89%	2,164	22.57%	5,996	62.54%
1916	6,008	61.31%	2,957	30.17%	835	8.52%
1920	12,436	75.81%	2,912	17.75%	1,056	6.44%
1924	12,389	72.74%	2,315	13.59%	2,328	13.67%
1928	16,404	77.90%	4,489	21.32%	164	0.78%
1932	11,857	58.56%	7,919	39.11%	473	2.34%
1936	17,375	51.50%	16,184	47.97%	182	0.54%
1940	17,369	55.12%	14,085	44.70%	58	0.18%
1944	16,039	60.74%	10,287	38.96%	79	0.30%
1948	13,910	60.54%	8,727	37.98%	341	1.48%
1952	18,589	58.42%	13,167	41.38%	64	0.20%
1956	20,568	60.95%	13,163	39.00%	17	0.05%
1960	20,554	58.17%	14,739	41.71%	42	0.12%
1964	14,817	45.15%	17,934	54.65%	63	0.19%
1968	17,511	56.63%	11,515	37.24%	1,895	6.13%
1972	19,739	68.44%	8,743	30.31%	359	1.24%
1976	15,960	53.76%	13,452	45.32%	273	0.92%
1980	17,729	58.21%	11,695	38.40%	1,031	3.39%
1984	19,502	58.23%	13,900	41.50%	89	0.27%
1988	16,809	54.63%	13,815	44.90%	144	0.47%
1992	13,858	42.30%	12,493	38.14%	6,408	19.56%
1996	14,735	46.64%	12,719	40.26%	4,137	13.10%
2000	20,218	61.29%	12,028	36.47%	739	2.24%
2004	23,802	64.72%	12,842	34.92%	134	0.36%
2008	21,686	61.32%	12,878	36.41%	804	2.27%
2012	23,984	70.38%	9,436	27.69%	658	1.93%
2016	27,379	75.90%	7,376	20.45%	1,318	3.65%
2020	31,466	77.45%	8,654	21.30%	506	1.25%
2024	31,993	78.06%	8,596	20.97%	398	0.97%

United States Senate election results for Somerset County, Pennsylvania1
Year	Republican		Democratic		Third party(ies)	
Year	No.	%	No.	%	No.	%
1994	14,413	53.76%	11,261	42.01%	1,134	4.23%
2000	19,028	58.03%	13,129	40.04%	634	1.93%
2006	13,391	48.79%	14,054	51.21%	0	0.00%
2012	22,190	65.65%	10,866	32.15%	744	2.20%
2018	18,896	65.98%	9,322	32.55%	419	1.46%
2024	30,667	75.13%	9,059	22.19%	1,090	2.67%

United States Senate election results for Somerset County, Pennsylvania3
Year	Republican		Democratic		Third party(ies)	
Year	No.	%	No.	%	No.	%
1992	16,669	51.42%	13,335	41.13%	2,415	7.45%
1998	7,986	32.61%	16,203	66.17%	297	1.21%
2004	21,898	60.56%	11,602	32.09%	2,660	7.36%
2010	17,209	66.97%	8,488	33.03%	0	0.00%
2016	25,470	71.28%	8,340	23.34%	1,923	5.38%
2022	23,964	73.67%	7,660	23.55%	904	2.78%

Pennsylvania Gubernatorial election results for Somerset County
Year	Republican		Democratic		Third party(ies)	
Year	No.	%	No.	%	No.	%
1970	12,848	49.50%	12,503	48.17%	605	2.33%
1974	13,319	54.57%	10,880	44.58%	206	0.84%
1978	10,578	41.60%	14,720	57.90%	127	0.50%
1982	13,195	50.05%	13,052	49.51%	117	0.44%
1986	11,471	44.05%	14,297	54.90%	272	1.04%
1990	6,937	28.26%	17,610	71.74%	0	0.00%
1994	11,724	43.56%	11,383	42.29%	3,808	14.15%
1998	14,829	61.15%	5,676	23.40%	3,747	15.45%
2002	16,244	65.56%	8,088	32.64%	446	1.80%
2006	15,028	54.59%	12,499	45.41%	0	0.00%
2010	18,542	71.77%	7,294	28.23%	0	0.00%
2014	13,150	57.80%	9,599	42.20%	0	0.00%
2018	19,020	66.21%	9,138	31.81%	570	1.98%
2022	22,559	69.25%	9,473	29.08%	544	1.67%

As of September 25, 2023, there are 47,835 registered voters in Somerset County.

- Republican: 31,340 (65.52%)
- Democratic: 11,715 (24.49%)
- Independent: 3,920 (8.19%)
- Third Party: 860 (1.80%)

=== County commissioners ===
Commissioners	Party	First Elected
Brian Fochtman, Chairman	Republican	2023
Irvin Kimmel, Vice-Chairman	Republican	2023
Pamela Tokar-Ickes, Secretary	Democratic	2019

=== Other county offices ===
Office	Official	Party	First Elected
Clerk of Courts	Rose Svonavec	Republican	2011
Prothonotary	C. Jeannie Custer	Republican	2023 (acting)
Coroner	Cullen Swank	Republican	2021
District Attorney	Molly Metzgar	Republican	2023
Recorder of Deeds	Patricia Peifer	Republican	2013 (appointed)
Register of Wills	Sharon Ackerman	Republican	2003
Sheriff	Dustin Weir		
Treasurer	Tony DeLuca	Republican	2021
Auditor	Jerry Lyons	Republican	2003 (appointed)
Auditor	JoAnne Walls	Republican	2015
Auditor	Shelley Glessner	Democratic	2015

=== State Representatives ===
- Matthew D. Dowling, Republican, 51st district
- Mike Reese, Republican, 59th district
- Carl Walker Metzgar, Republican, 69th district
- James Rigby, Republican, 71st district

=== State Senator ===
- Pat Stefano, Republican, 32nd district

=== United States Representative ===
- John Joyce, Republican, 13th district
- Guy Reschenthaler, Republican, 14th district

=== United States Senate ===
- John Fetterman, Democrat
- Dave McCormick, Republican

=== Pennsylvania State Police ===
- Station Commander, Sergeant Stephen Adamczyk

== Education ==
=== Public school districts ===
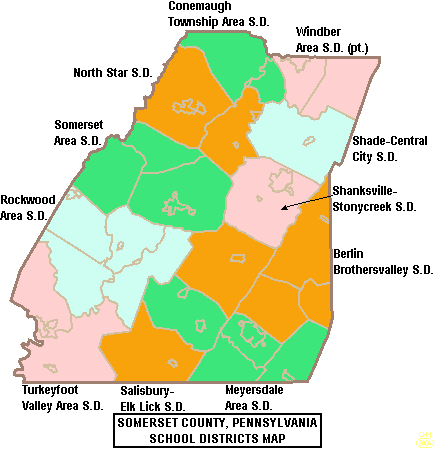
Map of Somerset County, Pennsylvania School Districts

School districts include:

- Berlin Brothersvalley School District
- Conemaugh Township Area School District
- Meyersdale Area School District
- North Star School District
- Rockwood Area School District
- Salisbury-Elk Lick School District
- Shade-Central City School District
- Shanksville-Stonycreek School District
- Somerset Area School District
- Turkeyfoot Valley Area School District
- Windber Area School District (also in Cambria County)

== Communities ==
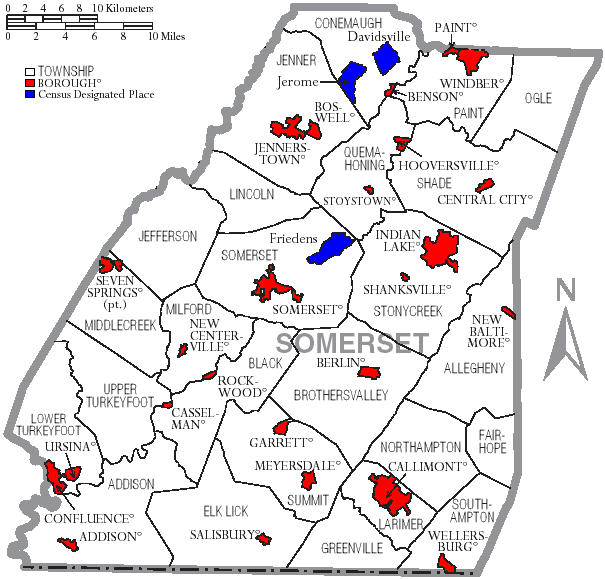
Map of Somerset County, Pennsylvania with Municipal Labels showing Boroughs (red), Townships (white), and Census-designated places (blue).

Under Pennsylvania law, there are four types of incorporated municipalities: cities, boroughs, townships, and, in at most two cases, towns. The following boroughs and townships are located in Somerset County:

=== Boroughs ===
- Addison
- Benson
- Berlin
- Boswell
- Callimont
- Casselman
- Central City
- Confluence
- Garrett
- Hooversville
- Indian Lake
- Jennerstown
- Meyersdale
- New Baltimore
- New Centerville
- Paint
- Rockwood
- Salisbury
- Seven Springs (partly in Fayette County)
- Shanksville
- Somerset (county seat)
- Stoystown
- Ursina
- Wellersburg
- Windber

=== Townships ===
- Addison
- Allegheny
- Black
- Brothersvalley
- Conemaugh
- Elk Lick
- Fairhope
- Greenville
- Jefferson
- Jenner
- Larimer
- Lincoln
- Lower Turkeyfoot
- Middlecreek
- Milford
- Northampton
- Ogle
- Paint
- Quemahoning
- Shade
- Somerset
- Southampton
- Stonycreek
- Summit
- Upper Turkeyfoot

=== Census-designated places ===
Census-designated places are geographical areas designated by the U.S. Census Bureau for the purposes of compiling demographic data. They are not actual jurisdictions under Pennsylvania law. Other unincorporated communities, such as villages, may be listed here as well.

- Cairnbrook
- Davidsville
- Edie
- Friedens
- Jerome

=== Unincorporated communities ===
- Acosta
- Deal
- Gray
- Jenners
- Markleton
- Springs
- Roxbury

=== Population ranking ===
The population ranking of the following table is based on the 2010 census of Somerset County.

† county seat

Rank	City/Town/etc.	Municipal type	Population (2010 Census)
1	Somerset	Township	12,122
2	Conemaugh	Township	7,452
3	† Somerset	Borough	6,277
4	Windber	Borough	4,683
5	Brothersvalley	Township	4,184
6	Jenner	Township	4,054
7	Paint	Township	3,300
8	Shade	Township	2,886
9	Summit	Township	2,368
10	Elk Lick	Township	2,293
11	Stonycreek	Township	2,237
12	Meyersdale	Borough	2,184
13	Quemahoning	Township	2,180
14	Berlin	Borough	2,104
15	Lincoln	Township	1,669
16	Milford Twp	Township	1,561
17	Friedens	CDP	1,523
18	Jefferson	Township	1,375
19	Boswell	Borough	1,277
20	Lower Turkeyfoot	Township	1,232
21	Davidsville	CDP	1,130
22	Central City	Borough	1,124
23	Paint	Borough	1,023
24	Addison	Township	1,019
25	Jerome	CDP	1,017
26	Black	Township	980
27	Rockwood	Borough	890
28	Middlecreek	Township	797
29	Confluence	Borough	780
30	Salisbury	Borough	727
31	Greenville	Township	718
32	Jennerstown	Borough	695
33	Lower Turkeyfoot	Township	672
34	Southampton	Township	655
35	Allegheny	Township	654
36	Hooversville	Borough	645
37	Larimer	Township	590
38	Ogle	Township	588
39	Cairnbrook	CDP	520
40	Garrett	Borough	456
41	Indian Lake	Borough	394
42	Northampton	Township	366
43	Stoystown	Borough	355
44	Shanksville	Borough	237
45	Ursina	Borough	225
46	Addison	Borough	207
47	Benson	Borough	191
48	Wellersburg	Borough	181
49	New Baltimore	Borough	180
50	Fairhope	Township	137
51	New Centerville	Borough	133
52	Casselman	Borough	94
53	Edie	CDP	83
54	Callimont	Borough	41
55	Seven Springs (partially in Fayette County)	Borough	26

== Notable people ==
- Jeremiah S. Black, Attorney General of the United States (1857–1860) and U.S. Secretary of State (1860–1861), under President James Buchanan;
- George Chorpenning, transportation pioneer
- Alexander Hamilton Coffroth (1828–1906), 19th-century Democratic U.S. Representative and Abraham Lincoln's final pallbearer to die
- Larry Critchfield (1908–1965), NFL player
- Joseph Darby, former US Army sergeant who was the first soldier to take official action against suspected and later confirmed mistreatment of prisoners by other soldiers in Abu Ghraib
- Rip Engle, head football coach at Brown University (1944-1949) and Penn State University (1950-1965)
- Joseph F. Loy, Wisconsin state senator and lawyer
- Howard Shultz Miller, U.S. Representative from Kansas.
- Keith Malley, comedian and podcasting pioneer co-host of the Keith and The Girl podcast
- Edwin S. Porter, silent movie director most famous for The Great Train Robbery
- Joseph C. Pringey, U.S. Representative from Oklahoma

== See also ==
- Cambria Somerset Authority – Water supply authority for Cambria County and Somerset County
- National Register of Historic Places listings in Somerset County, Pennsylvania
- Flight 93 National Memorial – unit of the National Park System that protects the crash site of Flight 93 which is the final resting place of the passengers and crew.
