= Reaction to the 2010 Copiapó mining accident =

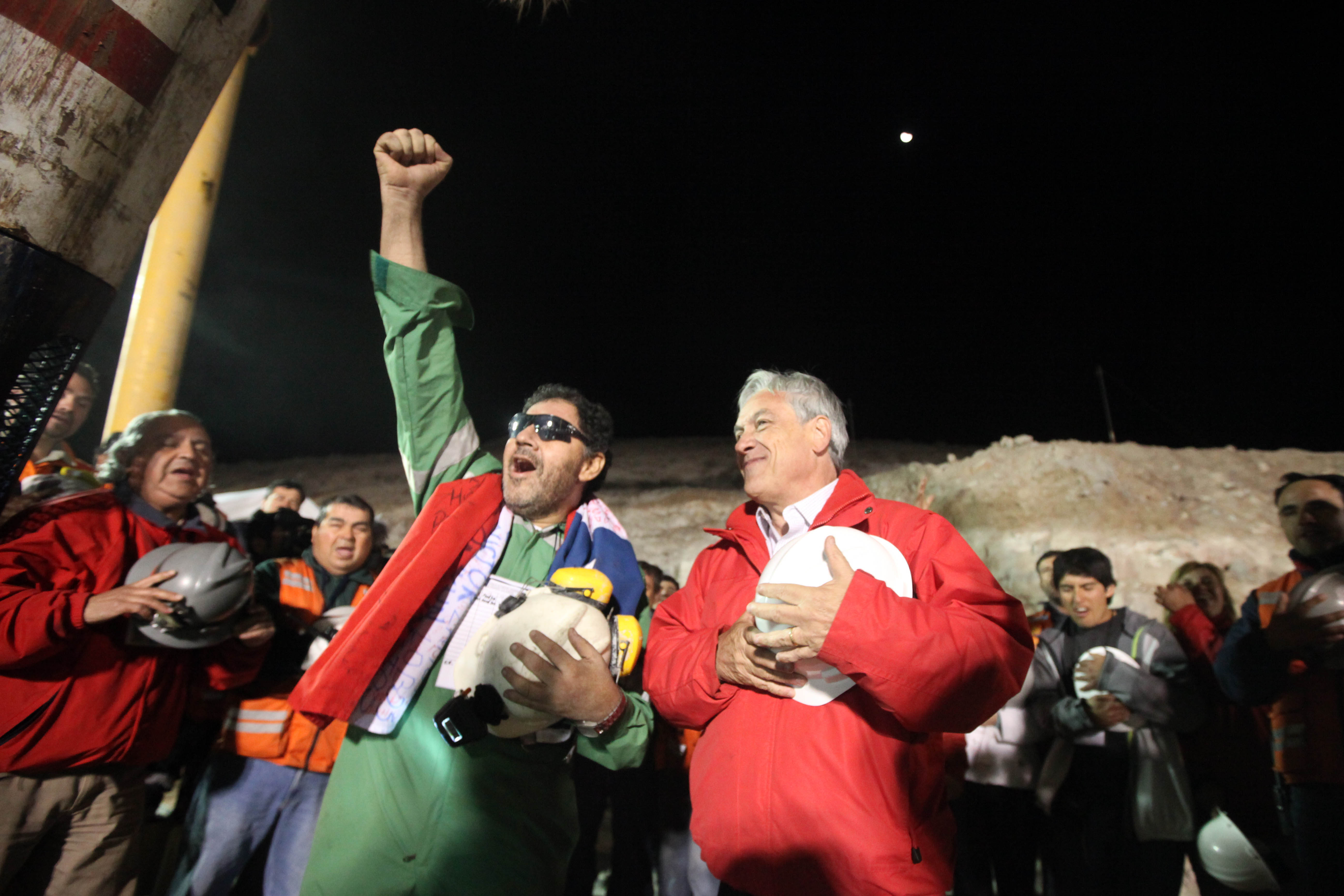
Luis Urzúa, the spokesman of the trapped miners and the last of the 33 to be lifted to ground level, celebrates with President Piñera at San José Mine, during "Operación San Lorenzo".

The 2010 Copiapó mining accident occurred when the San Jose Mine near to Copiapó, Chile, collapsed, leaving 32 miners of Chilean nationality and one Bolivian miner trapped inside about 700 metres (over 2000 feet) below the surface. The men were trapped in the mine for 69 days before being rescued. The discovery of the miners and their eventual rescue received global attention, with over 2000 members of the media reporting from the San Jose Mine. Global leaders expressed good wishes for the rescue and congratulations upon its successful completion.

== Political reactions ==
Chile

The iconic image of the six rescuers displaying the famous "Mision Cumplida CHILE" (Mission Accomplished Chile) sign in San José Mine near Copiapo, Chile

Chilean President Sebastián Piñera and First Lady Cecilia Morel were present during the rescue, greeting each of the miners individually as they emerged from the mine. Bolivian President Evo Morales was also scheduled to be on location for the rescue but did not arrive in time for the rescue of the trapped Bolivian miner, Carlos Mamani. During a visit to Europe following the rescue, Piñera was offered an audience with Queen Elizabeth II, who extended an invitation at the last minute following the mine rescue. He presented her with a rock from the mine as a gift.

After all the miners were rescued, Piñera gave a speech on location in which he was effusive in his praise of Chile and said he was "proud to be the president of all Chileans." He invoked Chile's recently passed bicentennial celebrations and said the miners were rescued with "unity, hope and faith." He also thanked Chávez and Morales, amongst others for their call for support. He said those who forced the rescue, i.e., those responsible for the collapse of the mine, will be punished, and said there would be a "new deal" with the workers.

The incident generated interest both within Chile and internationally, with the miners being declared heroes by many people. Firestations rang sirens across Chile in celebration after the final rescue. In Copiapo, thousands of people cheered, danced and wept during the rescue as people chanted "Long live Chile."

The rescue operation was broadcast live on various news networks and international media. The reaction from world media was enthusiastic, and the rescue made the front pages of newspapers worldwide: not only was the rescue from the greatest depth of any such operation ever, but the miners had waited to be found – let alone rescued – longer than any other survivors who had ever been in their predicament.

Russia

The rescue of the miners led to Russian bloggers asking why their country did not have a similar success story after a string of tragedies.

The last Russian mining catastrophe in May 2010 took the lives of 90 miners and rescue workers at the Raspadskaya mine near Mezhdurechensk, in southern Siberia, with safety breaches blamed for the disaster.

"The miner rescue operation is completed in Chile, greatly helped by the fact that (Russian Emergencies Minister) Sergei Shoigu did not participate in it," wrote blogger xeyrulla on his LiveJournal blog.

President Dmitry Medvedev said in a message to his Chilean counterpart Sebastián Piñera that the operation is "proof that any, even the most difficult challenges can be successfully overcome by the will and courage of people united by the same goal".

China

Escape capsules and shelter facilities were discussed in China after the news was released of the 33 Chilean miners being pulled to safety. An underground mine rescue chamber is believed to have played a key role. Luo Lin, head of the State Administration of Work Safety, made the remark at a meeting in Henan province after a gas leak killed 37 miners there. Mines in China were to have underground escape capsules and other emergency facilities by 2015, according to a previous administration work schedule.

The Changcun coal mine, which belongs to Shanxi's Lu'an Group, has been equipped with 16 underground escape capsules and seven shelter rooms. It was China's first mine with such safety facilities, China Youth Daily reported over the weekend. The capsule is a steel structure measuring 6.3 meters by 1.4 meters by 1.8 meters and can withstand the impact of a gas explosion. It has its own oxygen supply, air purifier and air conditioner and can keep 12 miners alive for 96 hours, according to the report.

Rest of the world

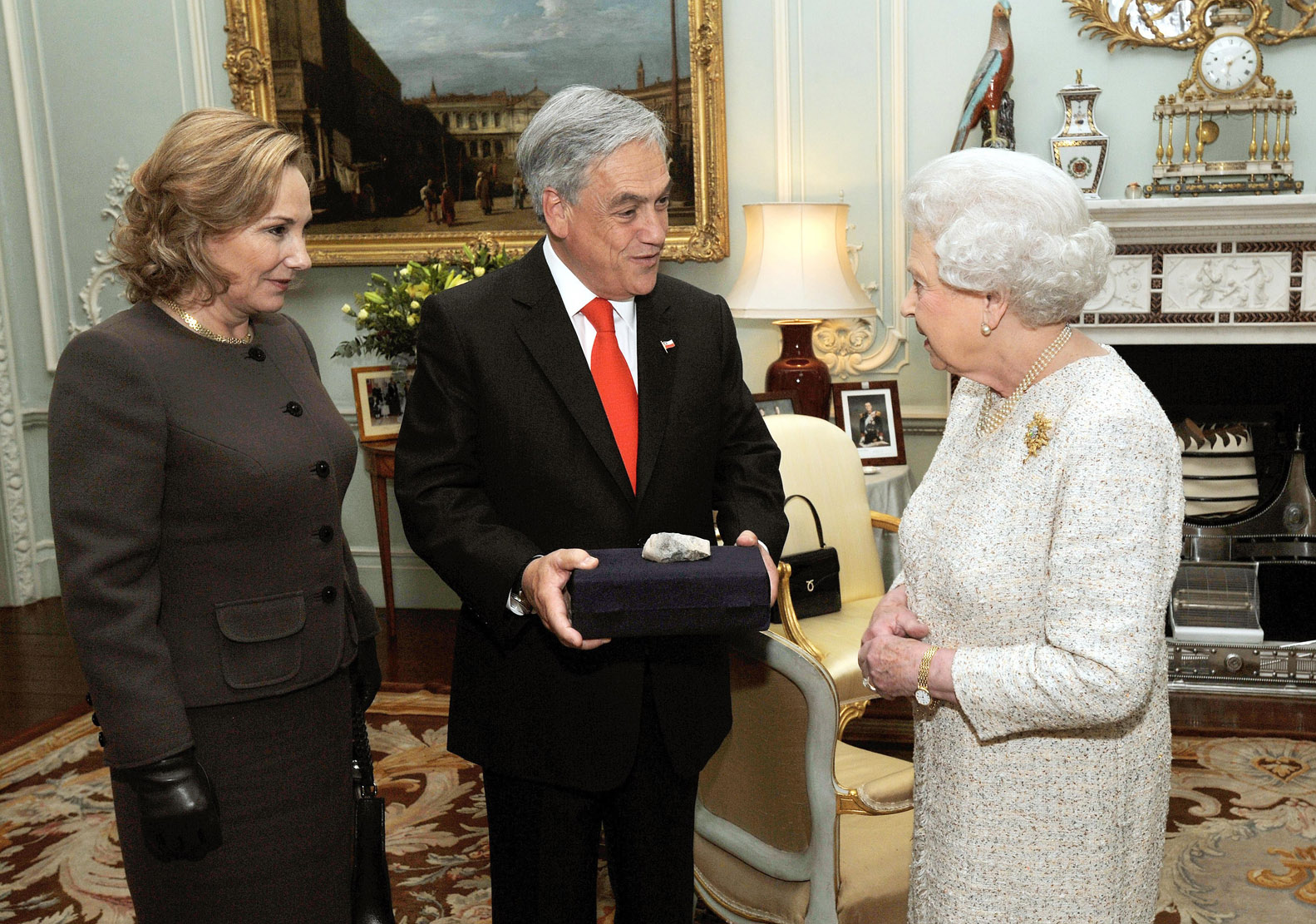
Chilean President Sebastián Piñera and First Lady Cecilia Morel present a souvenir gift rock from the San Jose Mine to Queen Elizabeth II on 18 October 2010 during a state visit to the UK.

A number of foreign leaders contacted Piñera to express solidarity and pass on congratulations to Chile while the rescue efforts were ongoing, including the Presidents of Argentina, Cristina Fernández de Kirchner; Colombia Juan Manuel Santos; Venezuela, Hugo Chávez; Brazil, Luiz Inácio Lula da Silva; Peru, Alan García; Uruguay, José Mujica and Poland, Bronisław Komorowski, and Prime Ministers of the United Kingdom, David Cameron, and of Spain, José Luis Rodríguez Zapatero.

Leaders including United States President Barack Obama, British Prime Minister David Cameron and Pope Benedict XVI offered congratulations to the coordinators of the rescue attempt and also to the miners themselves for their bravery. Cameron said during Prime Minister's Questions at the House of Commons:

I am sure everyone would like me on their behalf to send best wishes to the president and people of Chile as they celebrate the trapped miners coming to the surface.

President of the United States Barack Obama telephoned Piñera to pay tribute to the miners, rescue workers, the government and the Chilean nation. UN Secretary-General Ban Ki-moon spoke to Piñera the day after the rescue. His spokesman Martin Nersirsky said:

The secretary-general joined with the people of Chile and the families of the heroic miners to celebrate what he called the extraordinary triumph of human ingenuity and the strength of the human spirit.

South African President Jacob Zuma said:

Having a strong mining culture like Chile we [South Africans] can fully empathise with the fears and anxieties of those that have suffered this terrifying experience.

== Media coverage ==
The government provided exclusive non-stop television coverage of the rescue, available for free to broadcasters around the world. The contract was won by state-owned television station TVN, which deployed a team of 45 people. The government signal offered live views from inside the mine as the rescue capsule reached its destination.

The rescue was among the most-watched video streams of all time, according to internet monitors. Internet monitor Akamai said overall web traffic was 20 per cent higher than normal around the time the first Chilean miner was rescued late Tuesday, while the company's Net Usage Index for News indicated that the Chilean mine rescue was the fifth most-read-about online news event since the service began in 2005. According to a study from University of Navarra, Spain, this story had a far greater impact in the world's media than Chile's other big news story of 2010 - the massive earthquake in the south of the country in February.

As the rescue begun, the number of relatives swelled to 800 - but was quickly dwarfed by around 2,000 media employees who arrived from around the world to cover the event. Don Francisco, a Chilean TV host, broadcast live from the site, saying "I haven't seen so much media attention since the Apollo 11 back in 1969."

During the course of the rescue operation, around 2000 members from the international media were based on location at Camp Hope (Campamento Esperanza) close to the San Jose Mine. Reporters came from all over the world including such far flung places as Yemen, Iran, Russia, Finland, China, North Korea, and Japan. The rescue made the front pages of some newspapers worldwide. (Note: There have been some rescues from even greater depths. See, for example, the Beaconsfield Mine collapse.)

== International participation ==
A large number of governments and corporations across the globe joined in the effort to find, sustain and recover the trapped miners.

=== Governments ===
Chile:

- Ministries of Mining, Health, Labor and Defense
- Codelco, the Chilean state-owned mining company and the largest copper producer in the world. One of Codelco’s operations, El Teniente, is the world’s biggest underground mining operation and has experts trained for such emergencies. Two El Teniente employees, engineer Andrés Sougarret and René Aguilar, a risk management expert, were lent to the rescue operation full-time.

USA:

- NASA: As part of the rescue operation, NASA offered expert advice on medical, nutritional and behavioral health issues. The NASA team also provided suggestions regarding the rescue cages. NASA’s work in spacecraft design provided expertise with respect to medical requirements and design requirements. "We were able to provide the Chilean engineers designing the rescue cages some thoughts" said Dr. Michael Duncan, who led the team of NASA experts who traveled to Chile. The NASA team included two medical doctors, a psychologist and an engineer. Dr. Michael Duncan, deputy chief medical officer in NASA's Space Life Sciences Directorate at NASA's Johnson Space Center in Houston, led the team. The other team members were physician J.D. Polk, psychologist Al Holland and engineer Clint Cragg.

=== Corporate ===
Chile
- Drillers Supply S.A.'s in manufacturing plant in Antofagasta, Chile made the drill pipe and drill strings used in drilling the rescue bore-hole as well as numerous other items used in the rescue operation. They also assisted with logistics and planning related to Plan B.
- Geotec S.A. rented out the use of the Schramm T130XD air core drill which was Plan B.

Australia
- Drilling consultant, Kelvin Brown, an Australian drilling expert, flew to Chile to assist in the engineering plan.

Austria
- Östu-Stettin GMBH provided the specialized elevator winch system used to haul the miners to the surface.
- Teufelberger, the manufacturer of special-purpose ropes and straps from Wels, Austria provided the 1,000 metres (3,300 ft) long non-rotating Evolution TK 16 wire rope; non-rotating cable was necessary in order to prevent the capsule from spinning during the rescue.

Canada
- Cementation Canada, Inc. operated the Strata 950 that was part of Plan A.
- Precision Drilling Corporation of Calgary, Canada, built the Rig-421 drilling rig and provided the crew.

Japan
- Nippon Telegraph & Telephone Corp. provided the flexible fiber-optic cables essential to the two-way communications.

Korea
- Samsung Electronics provided the i7410 cellphone, which has a built-in projector so the men could watch soccer games, hold video teleconferences with the rescue teams on the surface and enjoy movies or watch training films.

Singapore
- Divoom Technology supplied the iTour-70 speakers that are almost 8 inches (20 cm) long and less than 2 inches (5.1 cm) inches wide and able to fit in the palomas so the whole group could listen to the classes and meetings held over the videoconferencing system and enjoy the entertainment videos. This technology enabled individual iPods to be banned by the rescue leaders over concerns that iPods would interfere with the ability of the miners to hear signs of impending emergencies, or contribute to individual psychological isolation rather than team integration.

South Africa
- Mining company Murray & Roberts had a Cementation Canada, Inc. operated Strata 950 raise bore drilling machine in Chile for a separate mining contract and relocated it to San Jose Mine to be part of Plan A.

United States
- Drillers Supply International, with Corporate Headquarters in Cypress, Texas, and a manufacturing plant in Antofagasta, Chile manufactured the drill pipe used in the rescue operation and assisted with logistics and planning related to Plan B.
- Layne Christensen Company, of Mission Woods, Kansas, provided the team of American drillers operating the Schramm T130 for Plan B.
- Center Rock, of Berlin, Pennsylvania, provided the specialized hammer drill bits used by Plan B.
- Schramm, Inc. of West Chester, Pennsylvania, built the T-130 drill system.
- United Parcel Service (UPS) based in Atlanta, shipped 50,000 pounds (23,000 kg) of heavy equipment to Chile for the rescue effort free of charge. The parts, including industrial strength drill bits typically used in building skyscrapers and bridges, came from all across the U.S. and were mainly in support of Plan B.
- Oakley of California provided free Radar sport sunglasses that typically retail for $450 to each of the miners to protect their eyes from the harsh light after so many days underground. The product placement has been estimated to be worth more than US$40 million in publicity.
- Aramark Corporation assisted with the subterranean food service and devised a way to get vacuum-packed hot food down the "umbilical" narrow shaft.
- Cupron Medical Inc. in Richmond, Virginia, supplied specialized socks made with copper fiber that consumed foot bacteria and minimized odor and infection.

=== Contributions to the miners ===
Jackets donated to the waiting families jackets to protect them against the cold nights of the high desert inspired others to donate many different types of resources to the victims' families.

- Bolivian President Evo Morales offered a job in state-owned petrol company YPFB, and promised a home for the Bolivian miner, Carlos Mamani.
- Chilean philanthropist Leonardo Farkas reportedly wrote US$10,000 checks to each of the miners to help them financially. On 20 October, he threw a party for the 33 men, giving each man a motorbike and offering to buy two of them houses. Additionally he gave an additional US$10,000 to the two men who became fathers while trapped.
- Workers at Codelco said they would chip in about US$600 per man.
- A Greek mining company, ELMIN Hellenic Mining Enterprises, has offered each of the miners and a travel companion a fully paid, one-week vacation in Greece. The trip also includes watching a Real Madrid soccer game in Madrid, Spain, as well as a Manchester United game in England.
- Chilean football players' association has offered the men a trip to South Korea.
- FC Barcelona sent the miners signed jerseys while they were underground to lift their spirits.
- Tourism Minister of Israel, Stas Misezhnikov, extended an official invitation to the 33 Chilean miners to experience a "spiritual journey" this Christmas in the Holy Land. The men are invited to Israel with their spouses for a week-long, all-expense-paid sightseeing tour of various sites holy to Christianity.
- Real Madrid sent autographed jerseys with the words "Have strength, miners" and an invitation to watch a game at the Santiago Bernabéu Stadium. Four of the miners accepted the invitation and met with the first team squad.
- Edison Peña was offered a trip to Graceland. Peña, who had been the group's song leader, had requested that Elvis Presley songs be sent down into the mine to help boost spirits.
- Steve Jobs of Apple sent each man an iPod Touch but Chilean officials withheld them before the rescue, concerned that the men might use music to isolate themselves from their fellow miners.
- The New York Road Runners club that organises the New York City Marathon has invited Edison Peña, who was reported to run 5 to 10 kilometres (3.1 to 6.2 mi) a day while underground, a free trip to run in the annual marathon.

== Social impact ==
Book and movie deals developed in response to the accident and successful rescue. The first of several books was titled "Under the Earth: The 33 Miners that Moved the World". Another book about the saga is "33 Men, Buried Alive: The Inside Story of the Trapped Chilean Miners" by The Guardian contributor Jonathan Franklin. The 33, a movie dramatizing the events, was released in 2015.
