= Maryland Route 47 =

State highway in Allegany County, Maryland, US, known as Barrelville Rd

Maryland Route 47
- Barrelville Road
- Maryland Route 47 highlighted in red

Route information
- Maintained by MDSHA
- Length: 1.67 mi (2.69 km)
- Existed: 1927–present

Major junctions
- South end: MD 36 in Barrelville
- North end: PA 160 near Barrelville

Location
- Country: United States
- State: Maryland
- Counties: Allegany

Highway system
- Maryland highway system; Interstate; US; State; Scenic Byways
← MD 45	→ US 48

Maryland Route 47 (MD 47) is a state highway located in Allegany County in the U.S. state of Maryland. Known as Barrelville Road, the state highway runs 1.67 miles (2.69 km) from MD 36 in Barrelville north to the Pennsylvania state line, where the highway continues north as Pennsylvania Route 160 (PA 160). While it is a minor route today, MD 47 was once part of the main highway between Cumberland and Somerset, Pennsylvania. The state highway was constructed in its modern form in the early 1920s.

== Route description ==
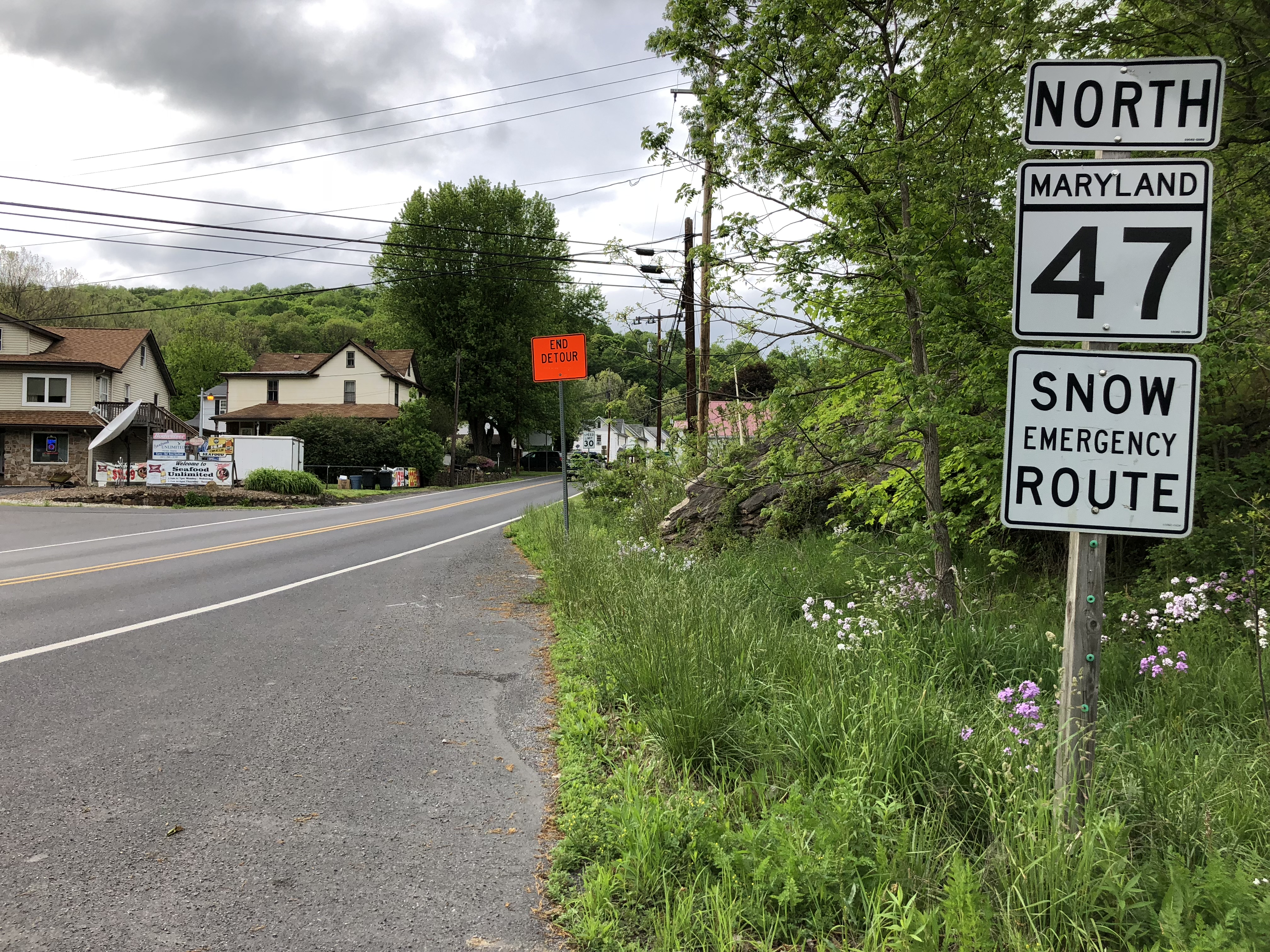
View north from the south end of MD 47 at MD 36 in Barrelville

MD 47 begins at an intersection with MD 36 (Mount Savage Road) in Barrelville. The state highway heads north as a two-lane undivided road through the valley of the North Branch of Jennings Run, which the highway crosses three times before reaching its northern terminus at the Pennsylvania state line. The highway continues north as PA 160 (Main Street), which passes through the borough of Wellersburg shortly after crossing the border.

== History ==
MD 47 is part of what was once the most direct route between Cumberland and Somerset. A road has existed along the alignment of the present state highway since at least 1804. By 1832, there was an effort to organize a turnpike company to connect Cumberland with the Somerset and Cumberland Turnpike at the state line. The modern MD 47 was paved by 1921. At least two of the bridges over the North Branch of Jennings Run were built in 1923. In 2012, the route was realigned at a bridge over the North Branch of Jennings Run.

== Junction list ==
The entire route is in Allegany County.

Location	mi	km	Destinations	Notes
Barrelville	0.00	0.00	MD 36 (Mount Savage Road) – Mount Savage, Cumberland	Southern terminus
	1.67	2.69	PA 160 north (Main Street) – Wellersburg, Somerset	Pennsylvania state line; northern terminus
1.000 mi = 1.609 km; 1.000 km = 0.621 mi

== Auxiliary routes ==
- MD 47A is the unsigned designation for Sturtz Lane, which runs 0.04 miles (0.064 km) from MD 47 north to the road end, at which point Sturtz Lane continues as a private road. The route was created in 2012 following a realignment of MD 47.
