= Pennsylvania Route 160 =

State highway in Somerset and Cambria counties in Pennsylvania, United States

Pennsylvania Route 160
- PA 160 in red and PA 160 Truck in blue

Route information
- Maintained by PennDOT
- Length: 69.7 mi (112.2 km)
- Existed: 1928–present

Major junctions
- South end: MD 47 in Wellersburg
- PA 31 near Berlin; US 30 in Stonycreek Township; PA 56 in Windber; PA 869 in Sidman; PA 53 in Wilmore
- North end: SR 4031 in Ebensburg

Location
- Country: United States
- State: Pennsylvania
- Counties: Somerset, Cambria

Highway system
- Pennsylvania State Route System; Interstate; US; State; Scenic; Legislative
← PA 159	→ PA 161

Pennsylvania Route 160 (PA 160) is a north–south state highway that is located in Somerset and Cambria counties in western Pennsylvania, United States. Its southern terminus is situated at the Mason–Dixon line south of Wellersburg, where the road continues into Maryland as Maryland Route 47 (MD 47), and its northern terminus is located at West High Street, which is designated State Route 4031 (SR 4031) and is formerly U.S. Route 219 (US 219), in Ebensburg.

Along its route, PA 160 crosses the Eastern Continental Divide and passes over CSX Transportation's Sand Patch Tunnel.

== Route description ==
=== Somerset County ===
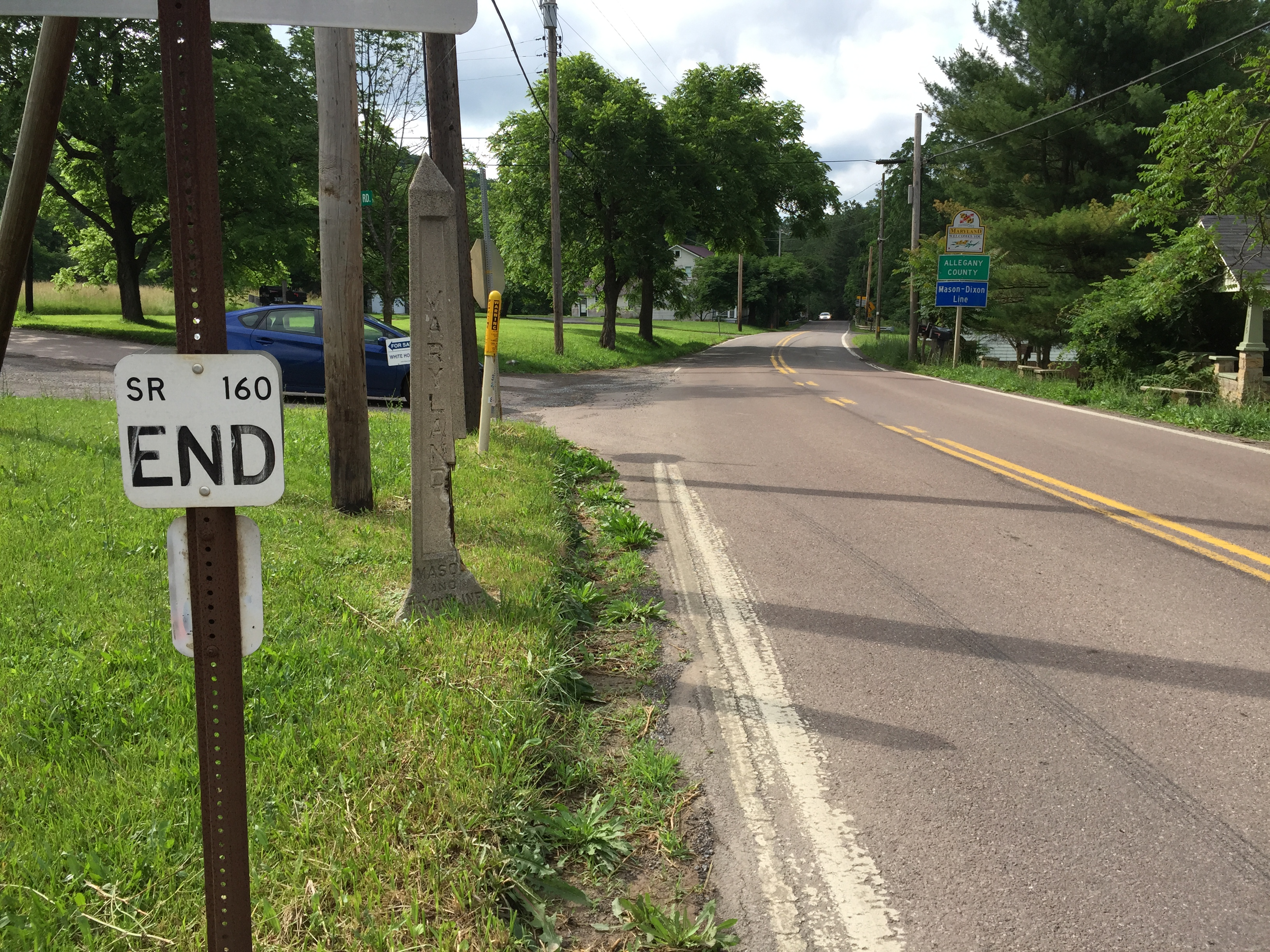
Southern terminus of PA 160 at the Maryland state border in Wellersburg

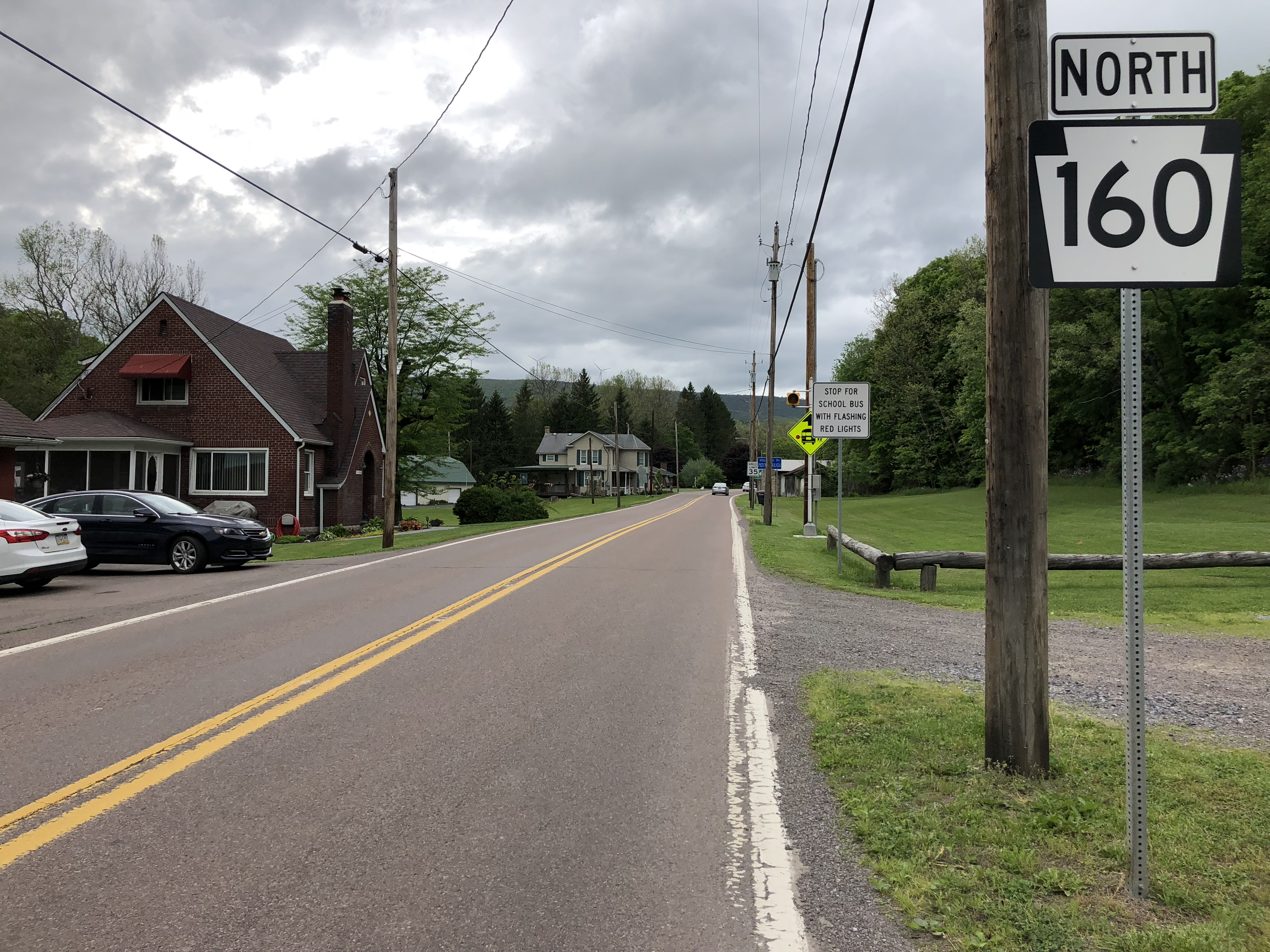
PA 160 northbound past its southern terminus at MD 47 at the Maryland border in Wellersburg

PA 160 begins at the Maryland border in the borough of Wellersburg in Somerset County, where the road continues south into that state as MD 47.

From the state line, the route heads north-northwest on two-lane undivided Main Street, passing through wooded areas of homes. The road turns north and enters Southampton Township, becoming Cumberland Highway and heading through forested areas with some residences. PA 160 curves northwest and heads west through more wooded areas with some fields and homes, passing through Pleasant Union. The road continues into Larimer Township and turns northwest into open agricultural areas with some woods and residences, forming the border between Larimer Township to the southwest and the borough of Callimont to the northeast again before fully entering Larimer Township again and passing southwest of Wittenberg.

The route forms the border between Larimer Township and Callimont on two more occasions before heading into more forested areas of Larimer Township and passes over the Sand Patch Tunnel carrying CSX's Keystone Subdivision railroad line. PA 160 turns north-northeast and runs through woods with some fields and homes, passing through Northampton Township before heading north into Brothersvalley Township. The road heads through farmland with some woodland and residences, reaching the borough of Berlin.

At this point, the route becomes Cumberland Street, passing homes and turning northeast onto Main Street. PA 160 curves east and passes through more residential areas before turning northeast onto Huckleberry Highway and crossing back into Brothersvalley Township. The road heads through open agricultural areas with some woodland and homes, coming to an intersection with PA 31 in Roxbury. This route then crosses into Stonycreek Township and continues through more rural areas, running through Downey and passing under I-70/I-76 (Pennsylvania Turnpike). PA 160 heads north-northeast through more farmland and woodland with some homes, passing through Glade.

The road passes to the east of the borough of Indian Lake prior to coming to an intersection with US 30 in Reels Corners, at which point it crosses into Shade Township.

Here, the route becomes Rock Cut Road and heads north through wooded areas with some residences, curving to the north-northeast. PA 160 turns to the east and enters the borough of Central City, becoming Lambert Street and heading east past homes. The route turns north onto Central Avenue before turning northeast onto Sunshine Avenue and crossing Norfolk Southern's South Fork Secondary railroad line as it heads into the commercial downtown of Central City. PA 160 turns northwest onto Main Street and passes through more residential areas before crossing back into Shade Township.

At this point, the road becomes Dark Shade Drive and heads north into wooded areas with some homes to the east of Dark Shade Creek, passing through Cairnbrook and Rockingham. The route heads into forested areas and crosses Clear Shade Creek into Ogle Township, turning northwest and heading into Paint Township. PA 160 turns north away from Shade Creek and heads through more woods with some development. The road curves to the north-northwest and heads into open farmland with some trees and homes, turning north. The route heads into rural residential areas and turns east onto Pomroys Drive, curving northeast through woods with some residential and commercial development and heading north into the borough of Windber.

PA 160 comes to an intersection with PA 56 and becomes 21st Street, crossing a B&E Railroad line and turning northeast into residential areas. The route turns northwest onto Graham Avenue and passes homes and businesses, crossing the railroad tracks and Paint Creek into the commercial downtown of Windber. PA 160 crosses Norfolk Southern's Windber Industrial Track railroad line and heads into residential areas, turning northeast onto 9th Street.

=== Cambria County ===
PA 160 enters Richland Township in Cambria County, becoming Forest Hills Drive and heading into wooded areas with some fields and homes, turning to the north. The road crosses Norfolk Southern's South Fork Secondary and continues into forested areas to the west of the railroad tracks, curving to the northeast. The route crosses into Adams Township and intersects the eastern terminus of PA 756 in the community of Elton. PA 160 continues northeast through a mix of farmland and woodland with some residences, turning north and east as it runs through the residential community of Salix. The road turns north through more rural areas, coming to an intersection with PA 869. At this point, PA 160 turns east to form a concurrency with PA 869, crossing Norfolk Southern's South Fork Secondary railroad line prior to crossing the South Fork Little Conemaugh River into Croyle Township. Here, the road becomes Mill Road passes through Lovett. PA 869 splits from PA 160 by heading southeast onto Beaver Run Avenue, and PA 160 heads east through woods with some fields. The road turns to the northwest and becomes Fairview Avenue, heading through areas of farms and woods with some homes. After a curve to the northeast, the route enters Summerhill Township and turns west onto Fieldstone Avenue before heading north onto Springside Avenue. PA 160 heads through more rural areas with some development before crossing into the borough of Wilmore, where it crosses Little Conemaugh River and passes under Norfolk Southern's Pittsburgh Line. The road heads into residential areas and crosses PA 53, becoming Evergreen Road.

The route continues back into Summerhill Township and runs northeast through farms and woods with some homes before heading north into forested areas. PA 160 heads into Cambria Township and becomes Wilmore Road, turning west onto Fairlane Road and heading through more woods with some homes, curving to the west-northwest. The route turns northeast onto New Germany Road and runs through more woodland with some fields and development, curving to the north. PA 160 heads into residential areas and turns northeast, passing to the southeast of the Ebensburg Center. The road passes under US 22 and becomes the border between Cambria Township to the west and the borough of Ebensburg to the east, turning north. PA 160 comes to its northern terminus at an intersection with SR 4031 (West High Street).

== Major intersections ==
County	Location	mi	km	Destinations	Notes
Somerset	Wellersburg	0.00	0.00	MD 47 south (Barrelville Road NW) – Corriganville, Cumberland	Maryland state line; southern terminus
Somerset	Stonycreek Township	21.7	34.9	PA 31 (Glades Pike) – Somerset, Bedford	
Somerset	Stonycreek Township	30.8	49.6	US 30 (Lincoln Highway) – Greensburg, Bedford	
Somerset	Windber	45.2	72.7	PA 56 (Clear Shade Drive) – Johnstown, Bedford	
Cambria	Adams Township	49.9	80.3	PA 756 west (Elton Road) – Geistown	Eastern terminus of PA 756
Cambria	Adams Township	55.3	89.0	PA 869 west (Locust Street) – South Fork	Southern terminus of concurrency with PA 869
Cambria	Croyle Township	55.5	89.3	PA 869 east (Beaver Run Avenue) – Beaverdale	Northern terminus of concurrency with PA 869
Cambria	Wilmore	61.3	98.7	PA 53 (Portage Street) – South Fork, Portage	
Cambria	Ebensburg	69.7	112.2	SR 4031 (West High Street) to US 219	Northern terminus
1.000 mi = 1.609 km; 1.000 km = 0.621 mi: Concurrency terminus

== PA 160 Truck ==
Pennsylvania Route 160 Truck
- Location: Cambria County

Pennsylvania Route 160 Truck is a truck route around a weight-restricted bridge over the North Branch of the Little Conemaugh River in Cambria County, Pennsylvania. It follows West High Street, US 22, US 219, and PA 53. It was signed in 2013.

== See also ==
- List of state highways in Pennsylvania
- List of highways numbered 160
