= Beechdale Bridge =

Covered bridge in Pennsylvania, US

- U.S. National Register of Historic Places
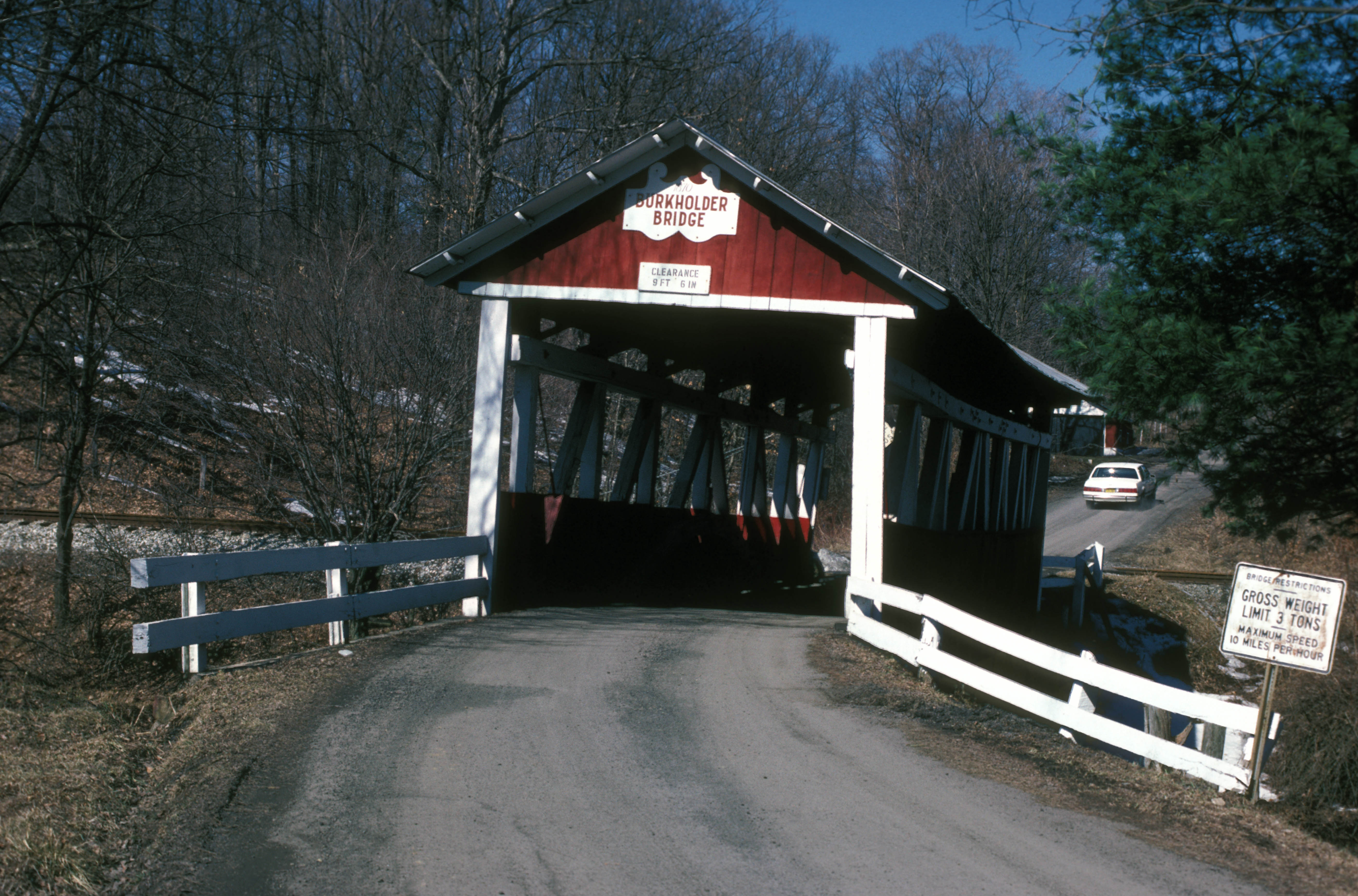

- Location within Pennsylvania Location within the United States
- Location: Southwest of Berlin off U.S. Route 219, Brothersvalley Township, Pennsylvania
- Coordinates: 39°52′54″N 79°2′5″W
- Area: 0.1 acres (0.040 ha)
- Built: 1870
- Architectural style: Burr arch
- MPS: Covered Bridges of Somerset County TR
- NRHP reference No.: 80003628
- Added to NRHP: December 10, 1980

The Beechdale Bridge, also known as the Burkholder Bridge, is a historic covered bridge in Brothersvalley Township, Somerset County, Pennsylvania. Township Route 548 crosses Buffalo Creek on the bridge, southwest of Berlin. The Burr truss bridge was built in 1870 by an unknown builder and is owned by the county. A distinctive feature of the bridge is the low sidewalls, which leave much of the structure open to view. It is one of 10 covered bridges in Somerset County.

It was added to the National Register of Historic Places in 1980.
