= Elton, Pennsylvania =

Unincorporated community in Pennsylvania, US

- Unincorporated community
- Location within Pennsylvania
- Coordinates: 40°16′47″N 78°48′08″W
- Country: United States
- State: Pennsylvania
- County: Cambria
- Elevation: 2,054 ft (626 m)
- Time zone: UTC-5 (Eastern (EST))
  - Summer (DST): UTC-4 (EDT)
- ZIP code: 15934
- Area code: 814
- GNIS feature ID: 1174189

Elton is an unincorporated community in Cambria County, Pennsylvania, United States. The community is located at the junction of Pennsylvania Route 160 and Pennsylvania Route 756, 7.1 miles (11.4 km) east-southeast of Johnstown. Elton has a post office with ZIP code 15934.
