= Jennings Run =

Location
- Country: United States
- State: Maryland

Physical characteristics
- Source
  - location: near Jennings Randolph Lake, Garrett County, Maryland, Backbone Mountain ridge
  - coordinates: 39°26′35″N 79°11′20″W
- Mouth
  - elevation: 0 ft (0 m)

Basin features
- River system: Potomac River#North Branch Potomac River

Jennings Run

Location
- Country: United States
- State: Maryland
- City: Frostburg

Physical characteristics
- Source
  - location: near Frostburg, Allegany County, Maryland, Savage Mountain ridge
  - coordinates: 39°40′06″N 78°55′18″W
- Mouth
  - elevation: 0 ft (0 m)

Basin features
- River system: Potomac River#North Branch Potomac River

Jennings Run (Garrett County) and Jennings Run (Allegany County) are Maryland tributaries to Three Forks Run and Wills Creek, respectively.

Jennings Run (Allegany County) begins near Frostburg. Mount Savage Run joins Jennings Run at Mount Savage, and another small creek beginning near Wellersburg adds its waters to Jennings Run at Barrelville. Jennings Run continues to Corriganville, where it merges with Wills Creek.
