= Larimer Township, Pennsylvania =

Township in Pennsylvania, US

Coordinates: 39°44′00″N 78°53′59″W

Larimer Township, Somerset County, Pennsylvania
- Township
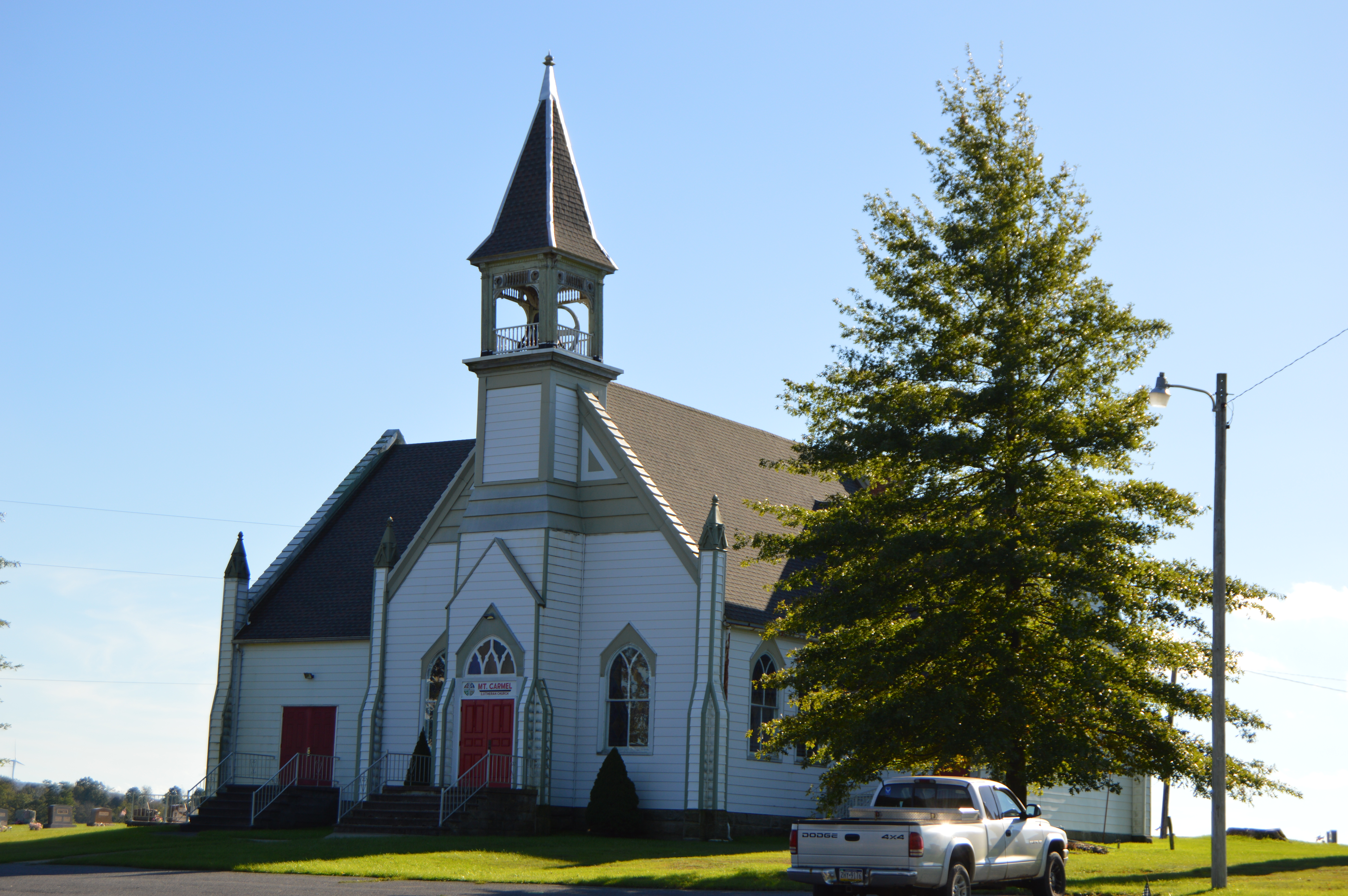
- Mount Carmel United Methodist Church

- Map of Somerset County, Pennsylvania
- Interactive map of Larimer Township, Somerset County, Pennsylvania
- Country: United States
- State: Pennsylvania
- County: Somerset

Area
  - Total: 16.84 sq mi (43.61 km^{2})
  - Land: 16.84 sq mi (43.61 km^{2})
  - Water: 0 sq mi (0.00 km^{2})

Population (2020)
  - Total: 543 ▼
  - Estimate (2021): 538
  - Density: 33.9/sq mi (13.09/km^{2})
- Time zone: UTC-5 (Eastern (EST))
  - Summer (DST): UTC-4 (EDT)
- FIPS code: 42-111-41568

Larimer Township is a township in Somerset County, Pennsylvania, United States. The population was 543 at the 2020 census. It is part of the Johnstown, Pennsylvania, Metropolitan Statistical Area. Larimer Township was named for General William Larimer Jr., president of the Pittsburgh & Connellsville Railroad.

== History ==
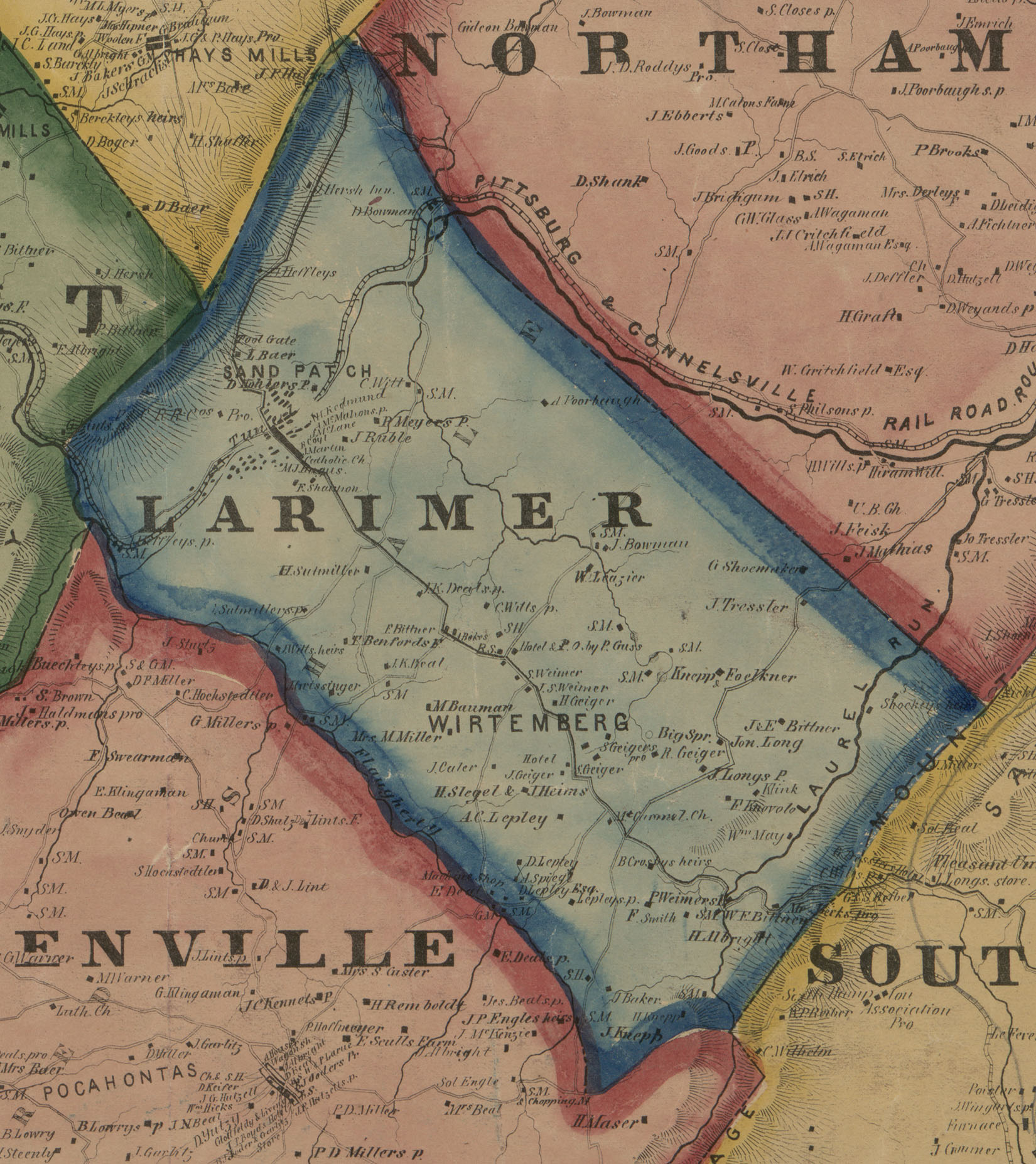
Larimer Township, Somerset County, Pennsylvania, 1860

Brigadier General John Forbes's Expedition of 1758 passed through the area that became Larimer Township, near Will's Creek, as they hacked Forbes Road out of the western Pennsylvania wilderness. (The reference that it was Major General Edward Braddock's Expedition of 1755 that passed through this area seems to have mixed up these two expeditions, since Braddock's Road passes through the extreme southwest corner of Somerset County.) Jonathan Long arrived in the area as early as 1783, and Richard Geiger was another early settler, possibly around the same time as Long. Daniel Lepley moved into Larimer Township in 1849 and built a gristmill here in 1850. The township was officially organized in 1854.

A portion of the township's land was used to incorporate the borough of Callimont in 1972 to build a ski resort. The resort was never completed and the borough used a lot of the township's resources during its history, including the use of the township's municipal building to hold the borough council meetings. In 2024, voters of Callimont and Larimer Township approved a referendum to merge Callimont back into Larimer Township effective January 1, 2026.

== Geography ==
It is located approximately at 39.8015 by -78.9488. According to the United States Census Bureau, the township has a total area of 16.7 square miles (43 km^{2}), all land. Larimer Township is bordered by Northampton Township to the northeast, Southampton Township to the southeast, Greenville Township to the southwest, and Summit & Brothersvalley Townships to the northwest. Pennsylvania Route 160 passes through Larimer Township, heading northwest from Wellersburg & Southampton Township on its way to Northampton Township & Brothersvalley Township.

The Eastern Continental Divide passes through Larimer Township, along the mountain summit above Sand Patch Tunnel. Wills Creek begins in the township and flows into Northampton Township, passing through Glencoe and Fairhope on its course eastward.

== Demographics ==
Historical population
Census	Pop.	Note	%±
2010	595		—
2020	543		−8.7%
2021 (est.)	538		−0.9%
U.S. Decennial Census

As of the census of 2000, there were 590 people, 213 households, and 172 families living in the township. The population density was 35.4 inhabitants per square mile (13.7/km^{2}). There were 257 housing units at an average density of 15.4/sq mi (5.9/km^{2}). The racial makeup of the township was 99.32% White, 0.51% Native American, and 0.17% from two or more races.

There were 213 households, out of which 35.7% had children under the age of 18 living with them, 70.9% were married couples living together, 5.6% had a female householder with no husband present, and 18.8% were non-families. 16.9% of all households were made up of individuals, and 9.4% had someone living alone who was 65 years of age or older. The average household size was 2.77 and the average family size was 3.11.

In the township the population was spread out, with 27.3% under the age of 18, 6.3% from 18 to 24, 31.4% from 25 to 44, 23.7% from 45 to 64, and 11.4% who were 65 years of age or older. The median age was 38 years. For every 100 females, there were 110.0 males. For every 100 females age 18 and over, there were 109.3 males.

The median income for a household in the township was $31,333, and the median income for a family was $35,500. Males had a median income of $27,422 versus $18,417 for females. The per capita income for the township was $13,301. About 11.0% of families and 15.1% of the population were below the poverty line, including 18.2% of those under age 18 and 25.0% of those age 65 or over.
