= Brothersvalley Township, Pennsylvania =

Township in Pennsylvania, US

Coordinates: 39°52′00″N 78°58′59″W

- Township
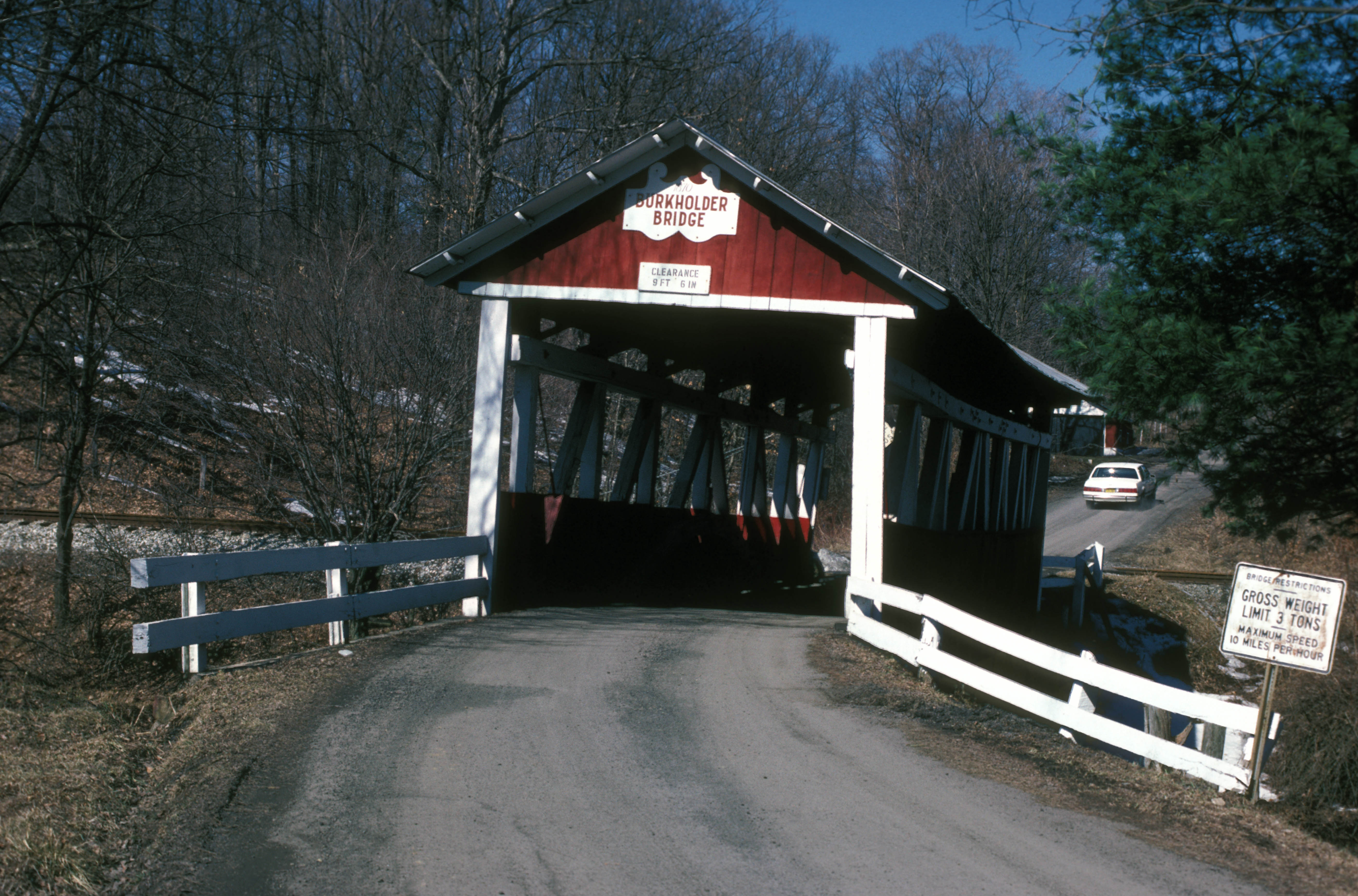
- Beechdale Covered Bridge pictured in 1970

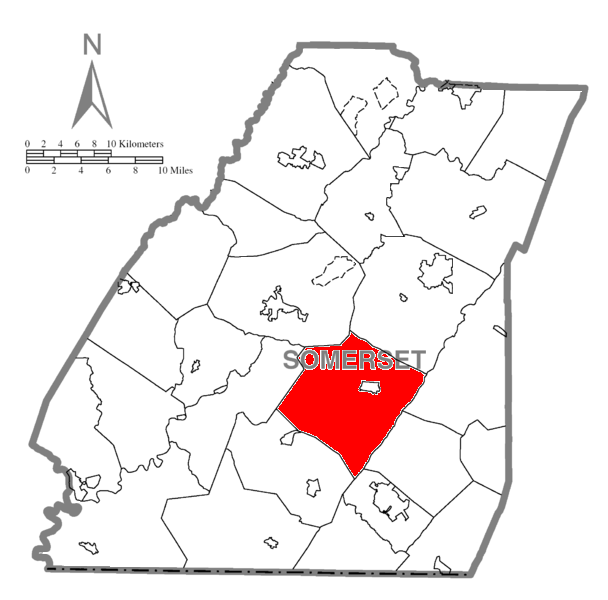
- Map of Somerset County, Pennsylvania Highlighting Brothersvalley Township

- Map of Somerset County, Pennsylvania
- Country: United States
- State: Pennsylvania
- County: Somerset
- Settled: 1769
- Incorporated: 1771

Area
  - Total: 62.60 sq mi (162.14 km^{2})
  - Land: 62.58 sq mi (162.09 km^{2})
  - Water: 0.019 sq mi (0.05 km^{2})

Population (2020)
  - Total: 2,377 ▼
  - Estimate (2022): 2,358
  - Density: 37.2/sq mi (14.36/km^{2})
- Time zone: UTC-5 (Eastern (EST))
  - Summer (DST): UTC-4 (EDT)
- FIPS code: 42-111-09256

Brothersvalley Township is a township in Somerset County, Pennsylvania, United States. The population was 2,377 at the 2020 census. It is part of the Johnstown, Pennsylvania, Metropolitan Statistical Area.

== History ==
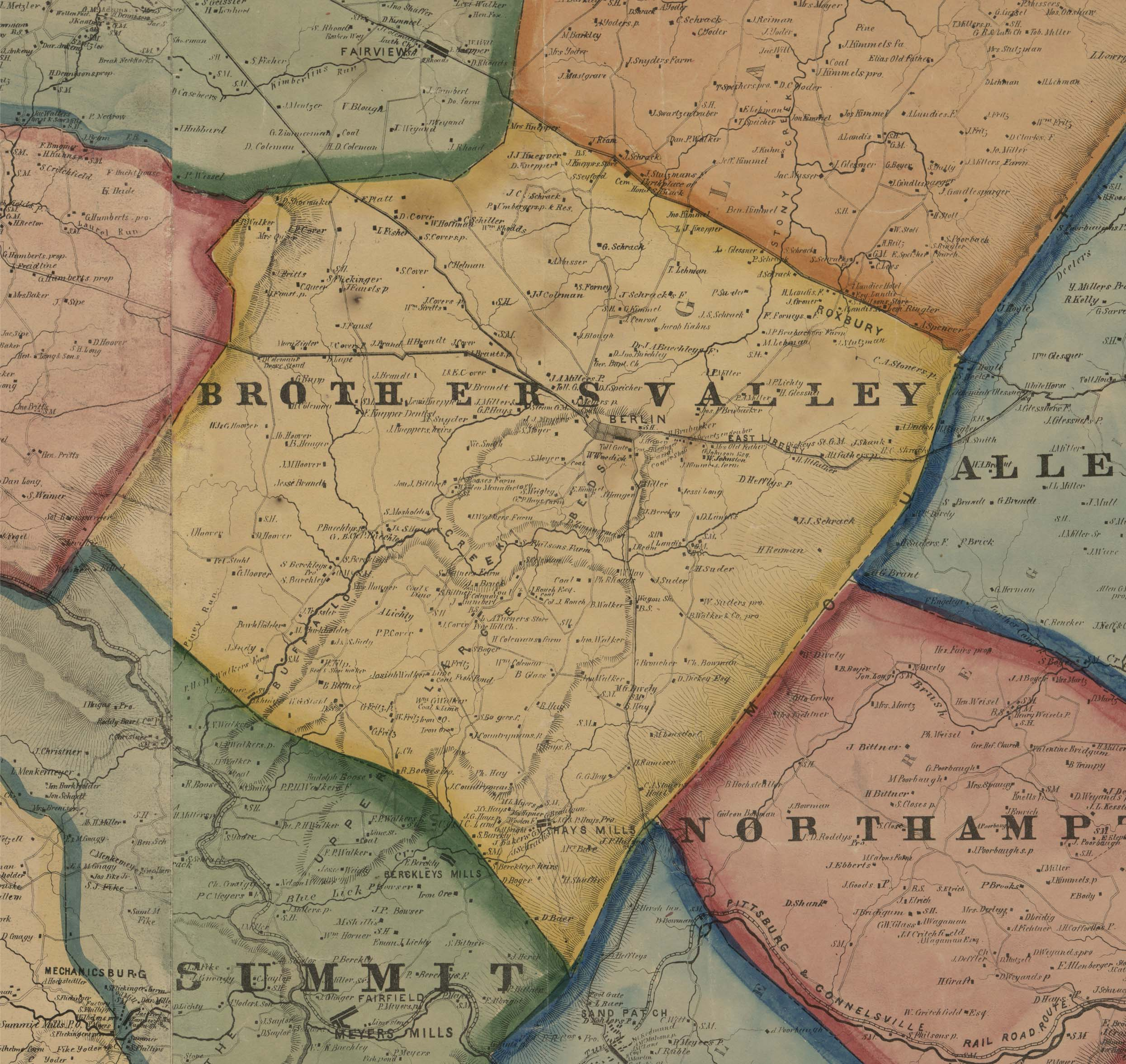
Brothersvalley Township, Somerset County, Pennsylvania, 1860

Brothersvalley Township was incorporated in 1771 and its largest borough, Berlin, laid out in 1784. The area was settled by immigrants, mostly from Germany, and became a hotbed of the Whiskey Rebellion.

The Beechdale Bridge was added to the National Register of Historic Places in 1980.

== Geography ==
According to the United States Census Bureau, the township has a total area of 62.7 square miles (162 km^{2}), of which 62.7 square miles (162 km^{2}) is land and 0.04 square miles (0.10 km^{2}) (0.03%) is water. Brothersvalley Township is bordered by Stonycreek Township to the northeast, Allegheny Township to the east, Northampton & Larimer Townships to the southeast, Summit Township to the southwest, Black Township to the west, and Somerset Township to the northwest. Pennsylvania Route 31 runs along Brothersvalley Township's northeastern border with Stonycreek Township and passes into Allegheny Township to the east. Pennsylvania Route 160 passes through Brothersvalley Township as it heads north from Larimer & Northampton Townships. Route 160 and Route 31 intersect in Roxbury as Route 160 advances northeast into Stonycreek Township.

== Demographics ==
Historical population
| Census | Pop. | Note | %± |
|---|---|---|---|
| 1970 | 2,080 | | — |
| 1980 | 2,373 | | 14.1% |
| 1990 | 2,395 | | 0.9% |
| 2000 | 4,184 | | 74.7% |
| 2010 | 2,398 | | −42.7% |
| 2020 | 2,377 | | −0.9% |
| 2022 (est.) | 2,358 | | −0.8% |
U.S. Decennial Census

At the 2000 census there were 4,184 people in 862 households, including 712 families, in the township. The population density was 66.7 inhabitants per square mile (25.8/km^{2}). There were 917 housing units at an average density of 14.6/sq mi (5.6/km^{2}). The racial makeup of the township was 69.50% White, 24.69% African American, 0.14% Native American, 0.33% Asian, 3.78% from other races, and 1.55% from two or more races. Hispanic or Latino of any race were 5.62%.

Of the 862 households 38.2% had children under the age of 18 living with them, 73.9% were married couples living together, 5.1% had a female householder with no husband present, and 17.3% were non-families. 14.0% of households were one person and 7.0% were one person aged 65 or older. The average household size was 2.80 and the average family size was 3.08.

The age distribution was 14.4% under the age of 18, 16.1% from 18 to 24, 43.7% from 25 to 44, 19.1% from 45 to 64, and 6.7% 65 or older. The median age was 33 years. For every 100 females there were 248.7 males. For every 100 females age 18 and over, there were 294.4 males.

The median household income was $40,119 and the median family income was $42,022. Males had a median income of $25,023 versus $21,389 for females. The per capita income for the township was $11,611. About 5.8% of families and 7.1% of the population were below the poverty line, including 10.2% of those under age 18 and 1.7% of those age 65 or over.

== Government and infrastructure ==
A small portion of State Correctional Institution – Somerset is in the township.

== Education ==
Almost all of the township is in Berlin Brothersvalley School District, while a small portion is in the Somerset Area School District.
