= Barrelville, Maryland =

- Census-designated place
- Location within the State of Maryland Barrelville (the United States)
- Coordinates: 39°42′10″N 78°50′33″W
- Country: United States
- State: Maryland
- County: Allegany

Area
  - Total: 0.042 sq mi (0.11 km^{2})
  - Land: 0.042 sq mi (0.11 km^{2})
  - Water: 0 sq mi (0.00 km^{2})
- Elevation: 1,011 ft (308 m)

Population (2020)
  - Total: 58
  - Density: 1,321/sq mi (509.9/km^{2})
- Time zone: UTC−5 (Eastern (EST))
  - Summer (DST): UTC−4 (EDT)
- ZIP code: 21545
- Area codes: 301 and 240
- FIPS code: 24-04525
- GNIS feature ID: 2583577

Barrelville is an unincorporated community and census-designated place (CDP) in Allegany County, Maryland, United States. As of the 2010 census, it had a population of 73. It is located between Corriganville and Mount Savage, where an 1804 road from Pennsylvania intersected the legendary Turkey Foot Road. Jennings Run flows from Mount Savage to Barrelville, where another tributary that runs south from Wellersburg, Pennsylvania, joins Jennings Run.

== Demographics ==
Historical population
Census	Pop.	Note	%±
2020	58		—
U.S. Decennial Census
