= John Sheridan Weller =

American lawyer (1866–1944)

Member of the Pennsylvania State Senate from the 36th district
- In office 1899–1902

Personal details
- Born: November 1, 1866 Southampton Township, Somerset County, Pennsylvania, U.S.
- Died: September 26, 1944 (aged 77) Pittsburgh, Pennsylvania, U.S.
- Resting place: Homewood Cemetery, Pittsburgh, Pennsylvania, U.S.
- Party: Republican
- Spouse: Sara Barbara Mercer
- Parent(s): Frederick Simon Weller; Mary Ann Hammer
- Education: Pennsylvania State College
- Profession: Politician, attorney

John Sheridan Weller (November 1, 1866 in Southampton Township, Somerset County, Pennsylvania – September 26, 1944 in Pittsburgh) was an American attorney and politician.

== Formative years and family ==
Born in Southampton Township, Somerset County, Pennsylvania on November 1, 1866, Weller was a son of Frederick Simon Weller and Mary Ann Hammer. He attended the Bedford County Public Schools and married Sara Barbara Mercer. The couple had no children. In 1889, he graduated from Pennsylvania State College as a civil engineer.

== Career ==
Weller began working for the United States Coast and Geodetic Survey shortly after his graduation from Penn State, and was admitted to the bar of Bedford County, Pennsylvania in 1891, following his completion of legal studies. From 1894 to 1897, he served as a district attorney for Bedford County, and in 1898 was elected a member of the Pennsylvania State Senate from the 36th District. In autumn of 1901, he moved to Pittsburgh, where he became a partner in the law firm Weller, Wicks and Wallace, during which time he specialized in oil and gas property law and often represented Mike Benedum and oil field developer Joe Trees.
