= Northampton Township, Somerset County, Pennsylvania =

Township in Pennsylvania, US

Coordinates: 39°53′00″N 78°52′59″W

- Township
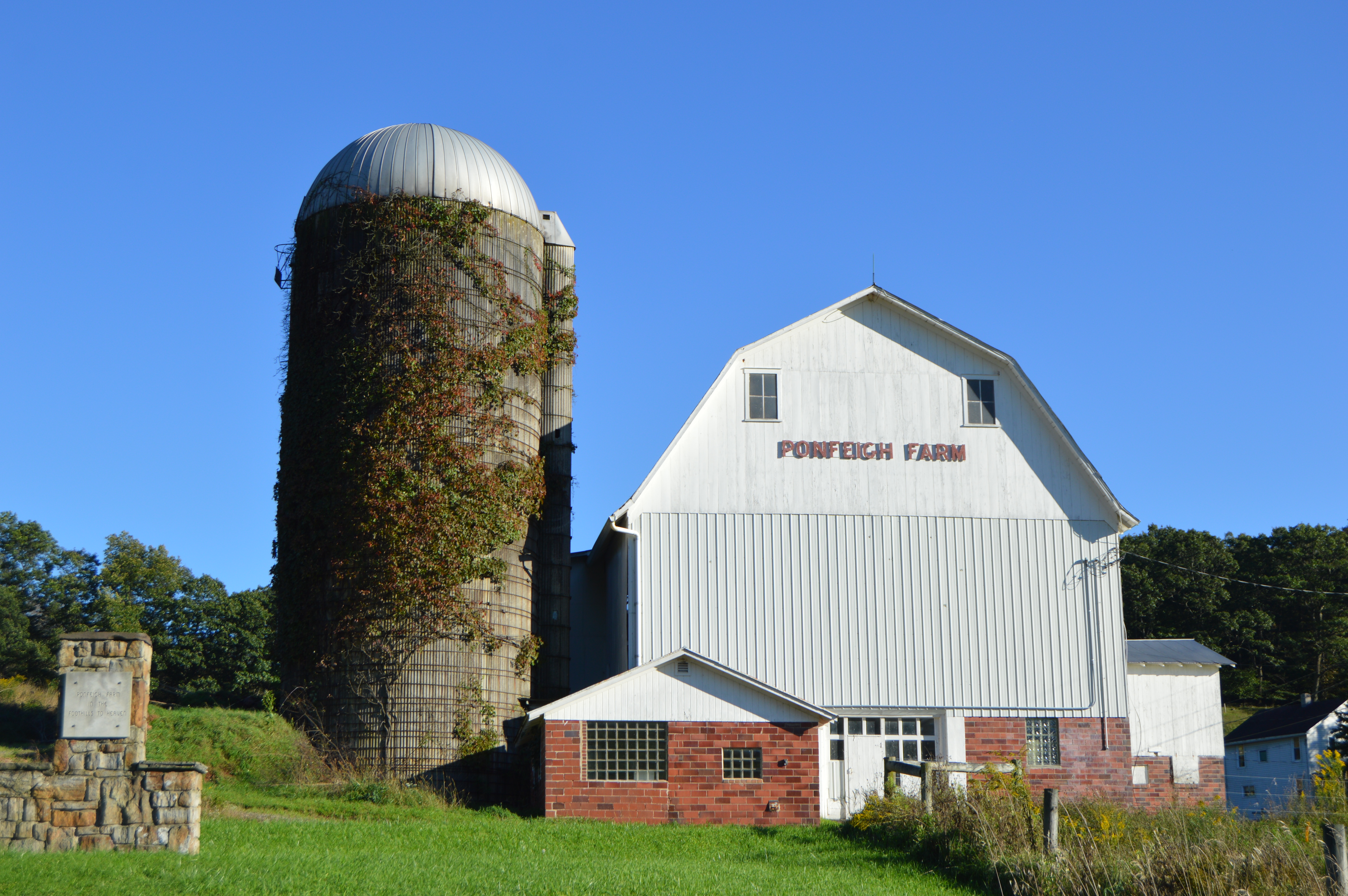
- Barn on Brush Creek Road

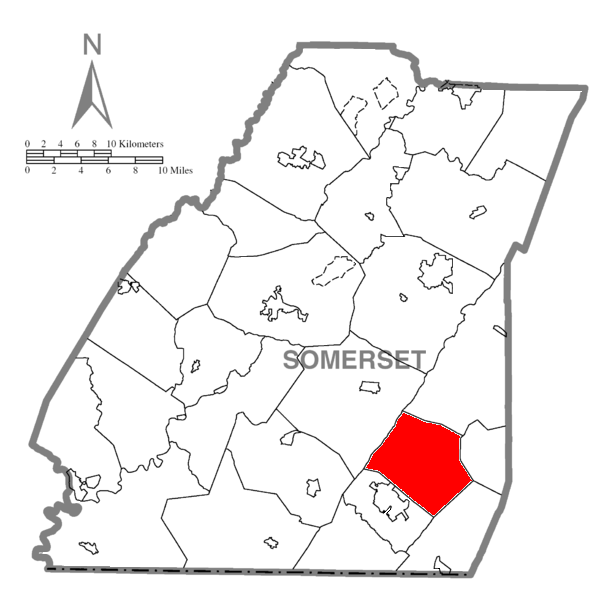
- Map of Somerset County, Pennsylvania Highlighting Northampton Township

- Map of Somerset County, Pennsylvania
- Country: United States
- State: Pennsylvania
- County: Somerset

Area
  - Total: 35.87 sq mi (92.91 km^{2})
  - Land: 35.87 sq mi (92.91 km^{2})
  - Water: 0 sq mi (0.00 km^{2})

Population (2020)
  - Total: 303 ▼
  - Estimate (2021): 301
  - Density: 9.2/sq mi (3.54/km^{2})
- Time zone: UTC-5 (Eastern (EST))
  - Summer (DST): UTC-4 (EDT)
- FIPS code: 42-111-54704

Northampton Township is a township in Somerset County, Pennsylvania, United States. The population was 303 at the 2020 census. It is part of the Johnstown, Pennsylvania, Metropolitan Statistical Area.

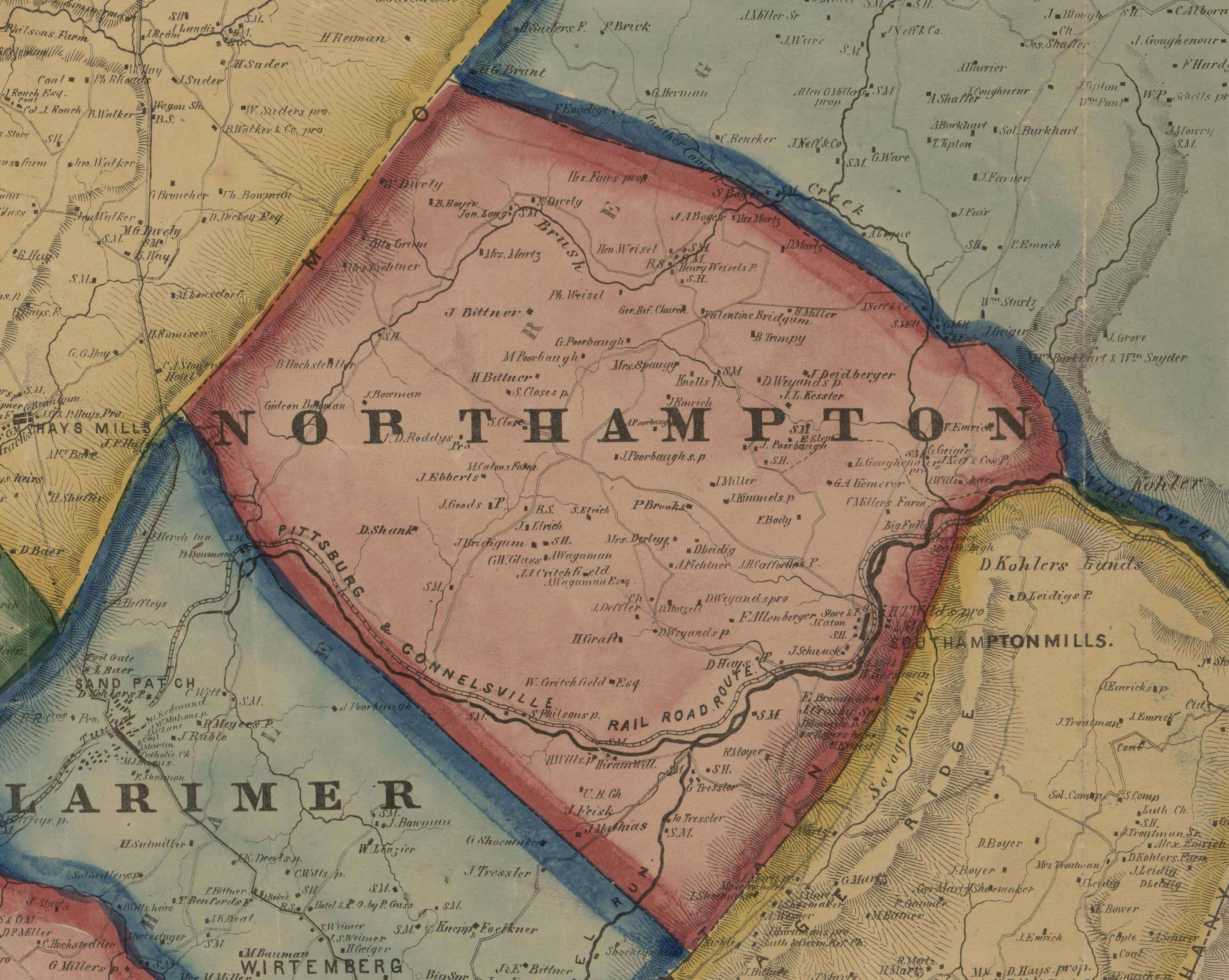
Northampton Township, Somerset County, Pennsylvania, 1860

== Geography ==
According to the United States Census Bureau, the township has a total area of 35.0 square miles (90.6 km^{2}), all land. Northampton Township is bordered by Allegheny Township to the northeast, Fairhope Township to the east, Southampton Township to the southeast, Larimer Township to the southwest, and Brothersvalley Township to the northwest. Wills Creek flows into Northampton Township from Larimer Township. The village of Glencoe is located in the southern portion of the township, as are the communities of Mance and Philson Station. All three sit along Wills Creek and CSX Transportation's Keystone Subdivision railroad. Pennsylvania Route 160 briefly passes through the extreme western tip of Northampton Township as it heads north from Larimer Township into Brothersvalley Township. State Game Lands No. 82 is also located in Northampton Township.

== Demographics ==
Historical population
Census	Pop.	Note	%±
2010	343		—
2020	303		−11.7%
2021 (est.)	301		−0.7%
U.S. Decennial Census

At the 2000 census there were 366 people, 151 households, and 112 families living in the township. The population density was 10.5 people per square mile (4.0/km^{2}). There were 247 housing units at an average density of 7.1/sq mi (2.7/km^{2}). The racial makeup of the township was 98.91% White, 0.27% African American, 0.27% Native American, 0.55% from other races. Hispanic or Latino of any race were 0.55%.

Of the 151 households 25.8% had children under the age of 18 living with them, 67.5% were married couples living together, 4.6% had a female householder with no husband present, and 25.2% were non-families. 23.2% of households were one person and 14.6% were one person aged 65 or older. The average household size was 2.42 and the average family size was 2.85.

The age distribution was 20.8% under the age of 18, 4.1% from 18 to 24, 26.0% from 25 to 44, 29.0% from 45 to 64, and 20.2% 65 or older. The median age was 44 years. For every 100 females, there were 105.6 males. For every 100 females age 18 and over, there were 108.6 males.

The median household income was $29,519 and the median family income was $34,000. Males had a median income of $28,833 versus $21,250 for females. The per capita income for the township was $15,021. About 7.7% of families and 10.2% of the population were below the poverty line, including 16.7% of those under age 18 and 9.0% of those age 65 or over.
