= Summit Township, Somerset County, Pennsylvania =

Township in Pennsylvania, US

Coordinates: 39°49′30″N 78°59′58″W

- Township
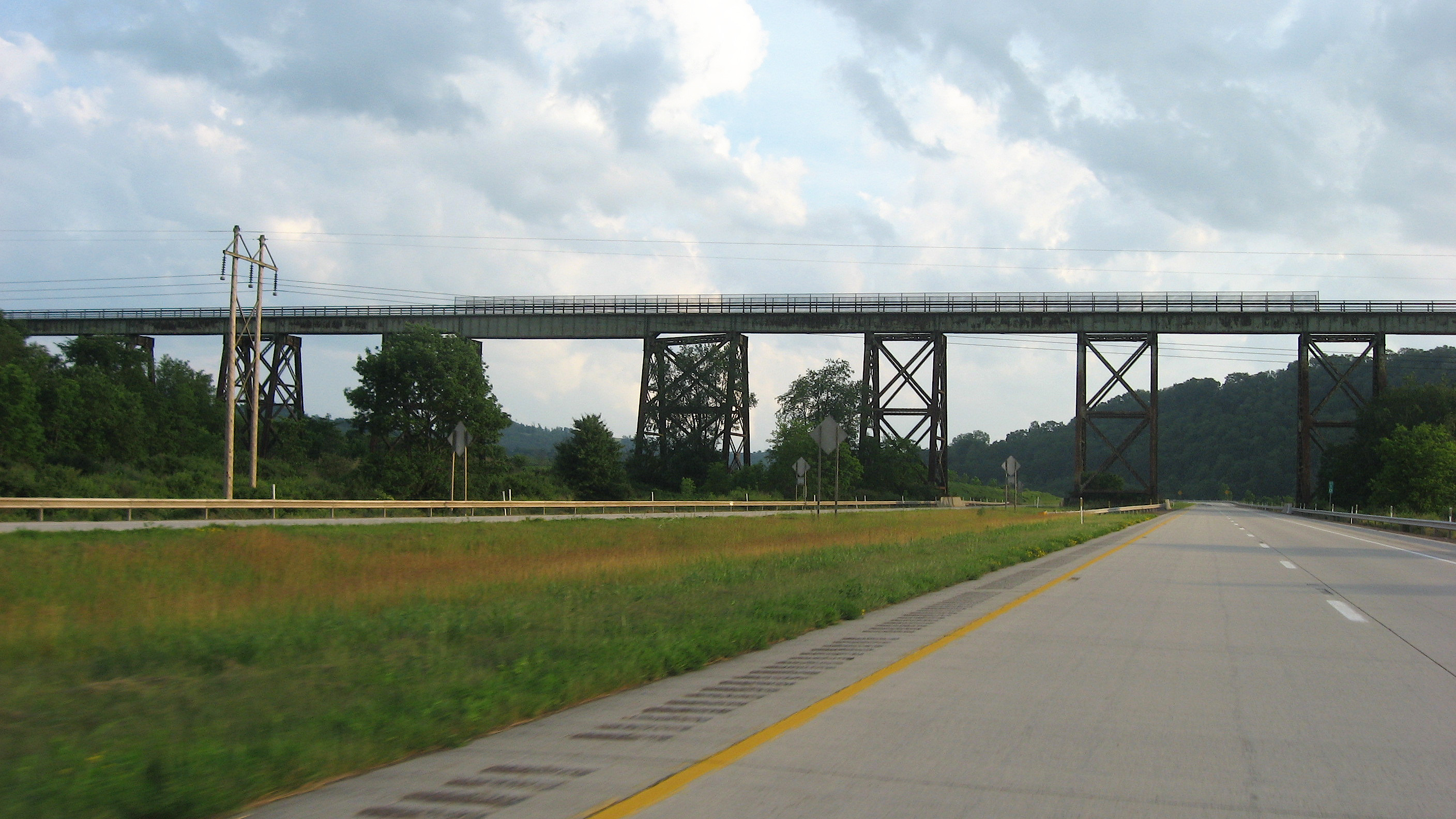
- A massive rail viaduct between Meyersdale and Garrett

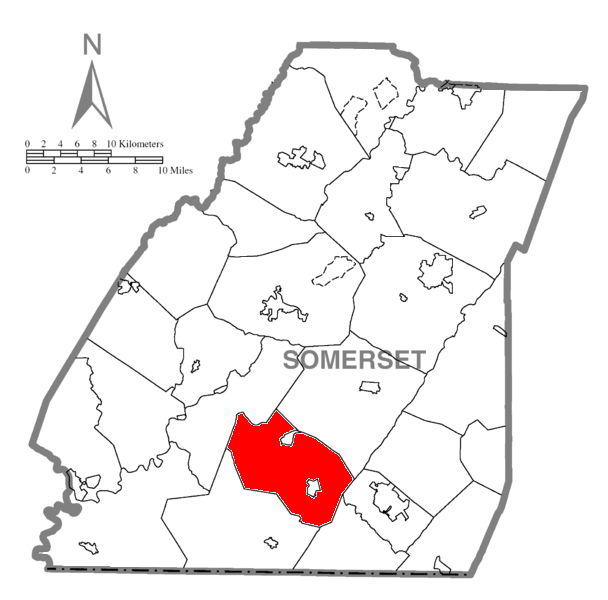
- Map of Somerset County, Pennsylvania Highlighting Summit Township

- Map of Somerset County, Pennsylvania
- Country: United States
- State: Pennsylvania
- County: Somerset

Area
  - Total: 45.26 sq mi (117.22 km^{2})
  - Land: 45.23 sq mi (117.14 km^{2})
  - Water: 0.035 sq mi (0.09 km^{2})

Population (2020)
  - Total: 2,141 ▼
  - Estimate (2021): 2,125
  - Density: 48.2/sq mi (18.61/km^{2})
- Time zone: UTC-5 (Eastern (EST))
  - Summer (DST): UTC-4 (EDT)
- FIPS code: 42-111-75232

Summit Township is a township in Somerset County, Pennsylvania, United States. The population was 2,141 at the 2020 census. It is part of the Johnstown, Pennsylvania, Metropolitan Statistical Area.

== History ==
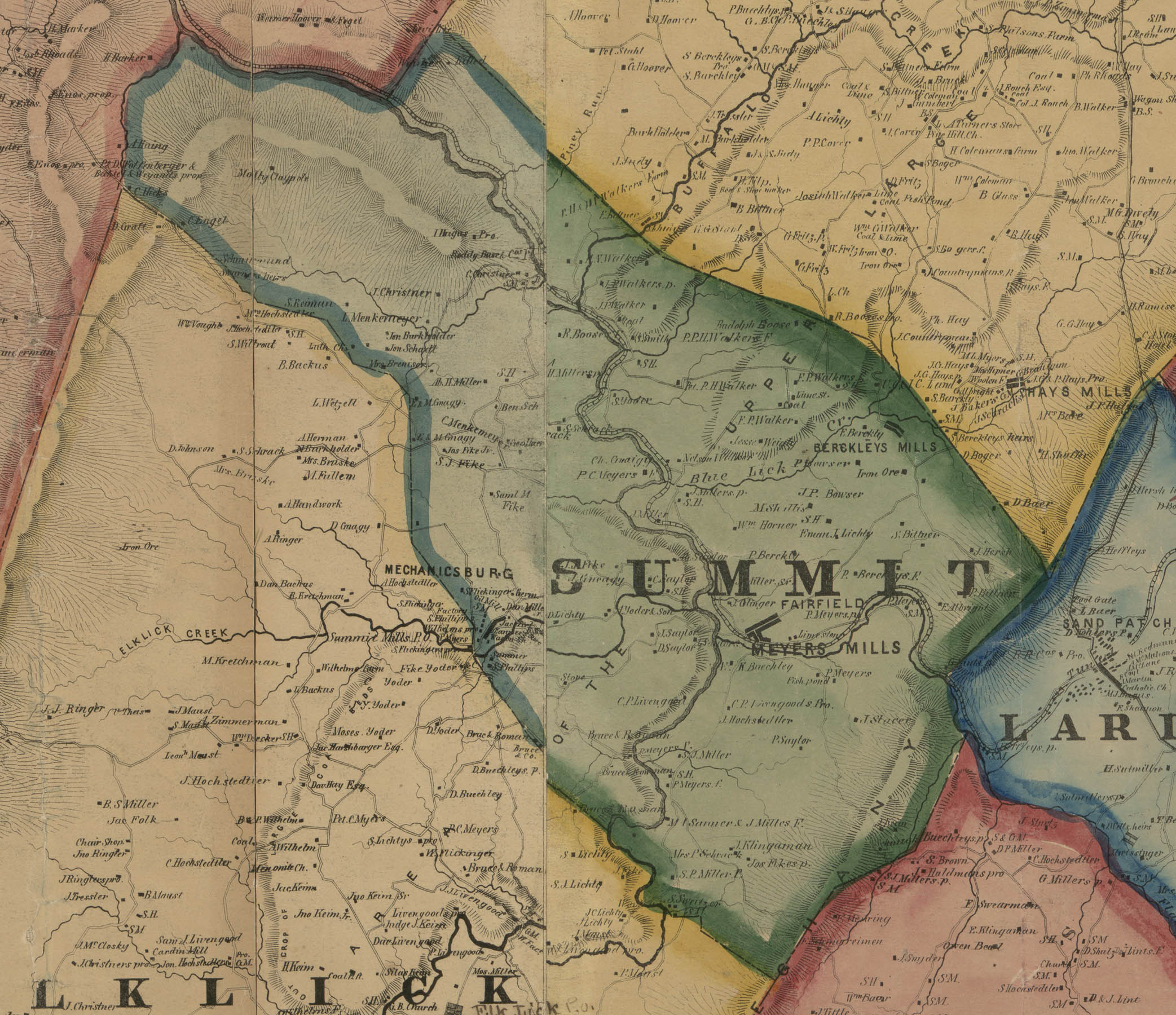
Summit Township, Somerset County, Pennsylvania, 1860

Portions of Elk Lick and Brothersvalley Townships were taken to form Summit Township in 1842. Some of the first settlers in this area included John Trusel, John Klingaman, Peter Miller, Stephen Yoder, and John J. Beachly. Some of the companies operating coal mines in the area in the 1880s included the Baltimore & Cumberland Coal Co., the Cumberland & Elk Lick Coal Co., the Keystone Coal Co., and the Casselman Coal Co.

The W. Bollman and Company Bridge was added to the National Register of Historic Places in 1978.

== Geography ==
According to the United States Census Bureau, the township has a total area of 45.1 square miles (116.8 km^{2}), of which 45.1 square miles (116.7 km^{2}) is land and 0.1 square miles (0.1 km^{2}) (0.11%) is water. Summit Township is bordered by Larimer Township to the east, Greenville Township to the southeast, Elk Lick Township to the southwest, Black Township to the northwest, and Brothersvalley Township to the northeast. The borough of Meyersdale is surrounded by Summit Township, and the borough of Garrett is located along Summit Township's border with Brothersvalley Township.

Pennsylvania Route 653 passes through part of Summit Township, generally running southeast from the borough of Rockwood and Milford Township, through Black Township, and into Summit Township, reaching its eastern terminus in the borough of Garrett as it intersects with Mason Dixon Highway / SR 2047.

== Demographics ==
Historical population
Census	Pop.	Note	%±
2010	2,271		—
2020	2,141		−5.7%
2021 (est.)	2,125		−0.7%
U.S. Decennial Census

At the 2000 census there were 2,368 people, 864 households, and 691 families living in the township. The population density was 52.6 inhabitants per square mile (20.3/km^{2}). There were 930 housing units at an average density of 20.6/sq mi (8.0/km^{2}). The racial makeup of the township was 99.11% White, 0.21% African American, 0.08% Native American, 0.04% Asian, and 0.55% from two or more races. Hispanic or Latino of any race were 0.04%.

Of the 864 households 33.2% had children under the age of 18 living with them, 70.3% were married couples living together, 5.8% had a female householder with no husband present, and 20.0% were non-families. 17.8% of households were one person and 10.0% were one person aged 65 or older. The average household size was 2.73 and the average family size was 3.09.

The age distribution was 24.2% under the age of 18, 8.0% from 18 to 24, 26.4% from 25 to 44, 25.7% from 45 to 64, and 15.7% 65 or older. The median age was 39 years. For every 100 females, there were 100.3 males. For every 100 females age 18 and over, there were 98.8 males.

The median household income was $32,115 and the median family income was $36,029. Males had a median income of $27,414 versus $20,559 for females. The per capita income for the township was $13,853. About 12.2% of families and 16.7% of the population were below the poverty line, including 20.8% of those under age 18 and 18.7% of those age 65 or over.
