= Southampton Township, Somerset County, Pennsylvania =

Township in Pennsylvania, US

Coordinates: 39°45′01″N 78°50′21″W

- Township
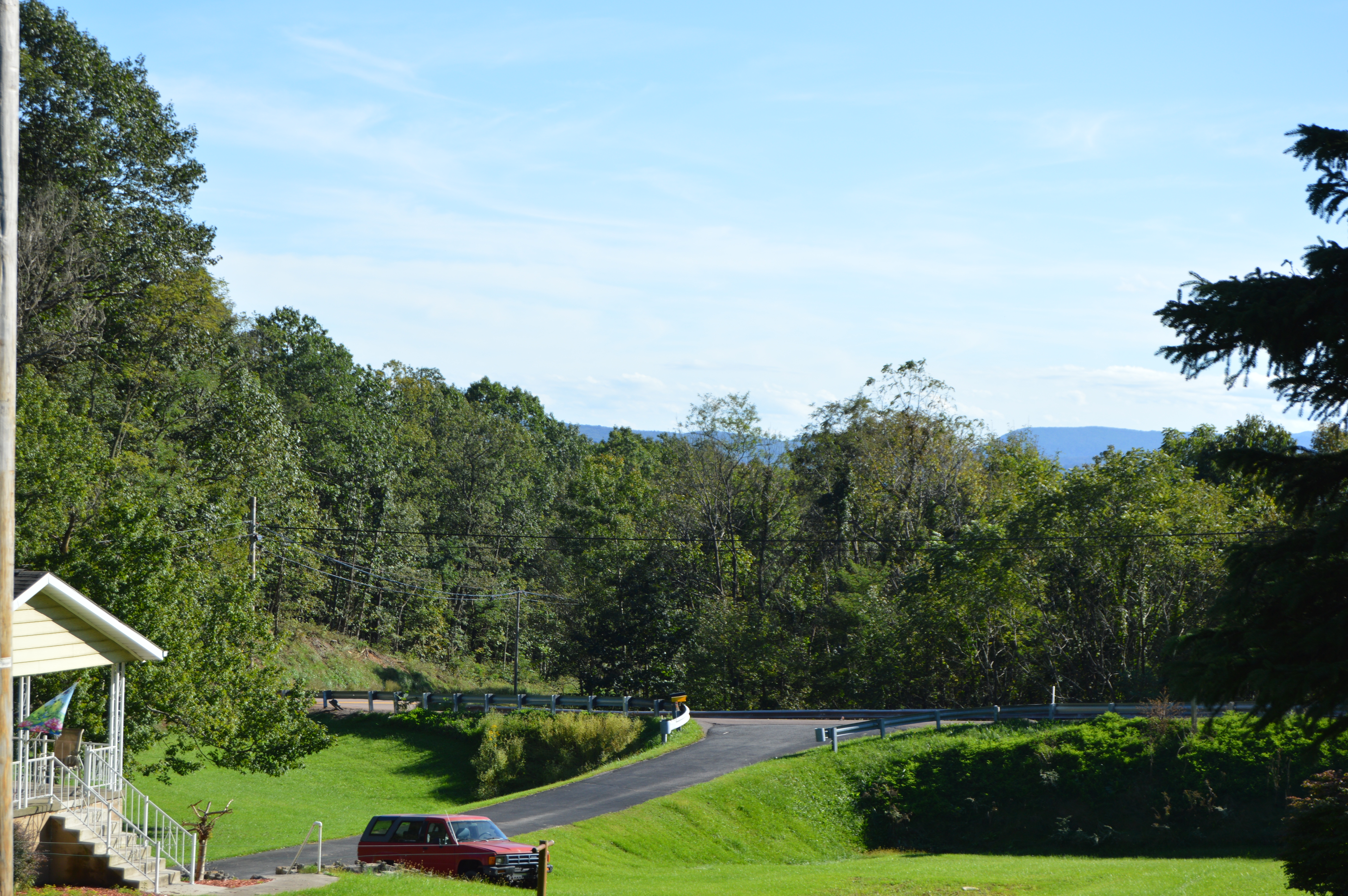
- Eastern slope of Savage Mountain, along Pennsylvania Route 160

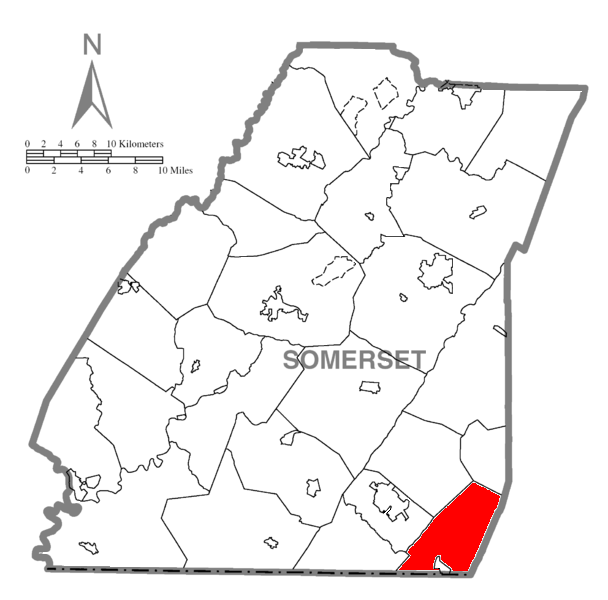
- Map of Somerset County, Pennsylvania Highlighting Southampton Township

- Map of Somerset County, Pennsylvania
- Country: United States
- State: Pennsylvania
- County: Somerset

Area
  - Total: 29.27 sq mi (75.81 km^{2})
  - Land: 29.27 sq mi (75.81 km^{2})
  - Water: 0 sq mi (0.00 km^{2})

Population (2020)
  - Total: 604 ▼
  - Estimate (2021): 599
  - Density: 21.1/sq mi (8.13/km^{2})
- Time zone: UTC-5 (Eastern (EST))
  - Summer (DST): UTC-4 (EDT)
- FIPS code: 42-111-71920

Southampton Township is a township in Somerset County, Pennsylvania, United States. The population was 604 at the 2020 census. It is part of the Johnstown, Pennsylvania, Metropolitan Statistical Area.

== Geography ==
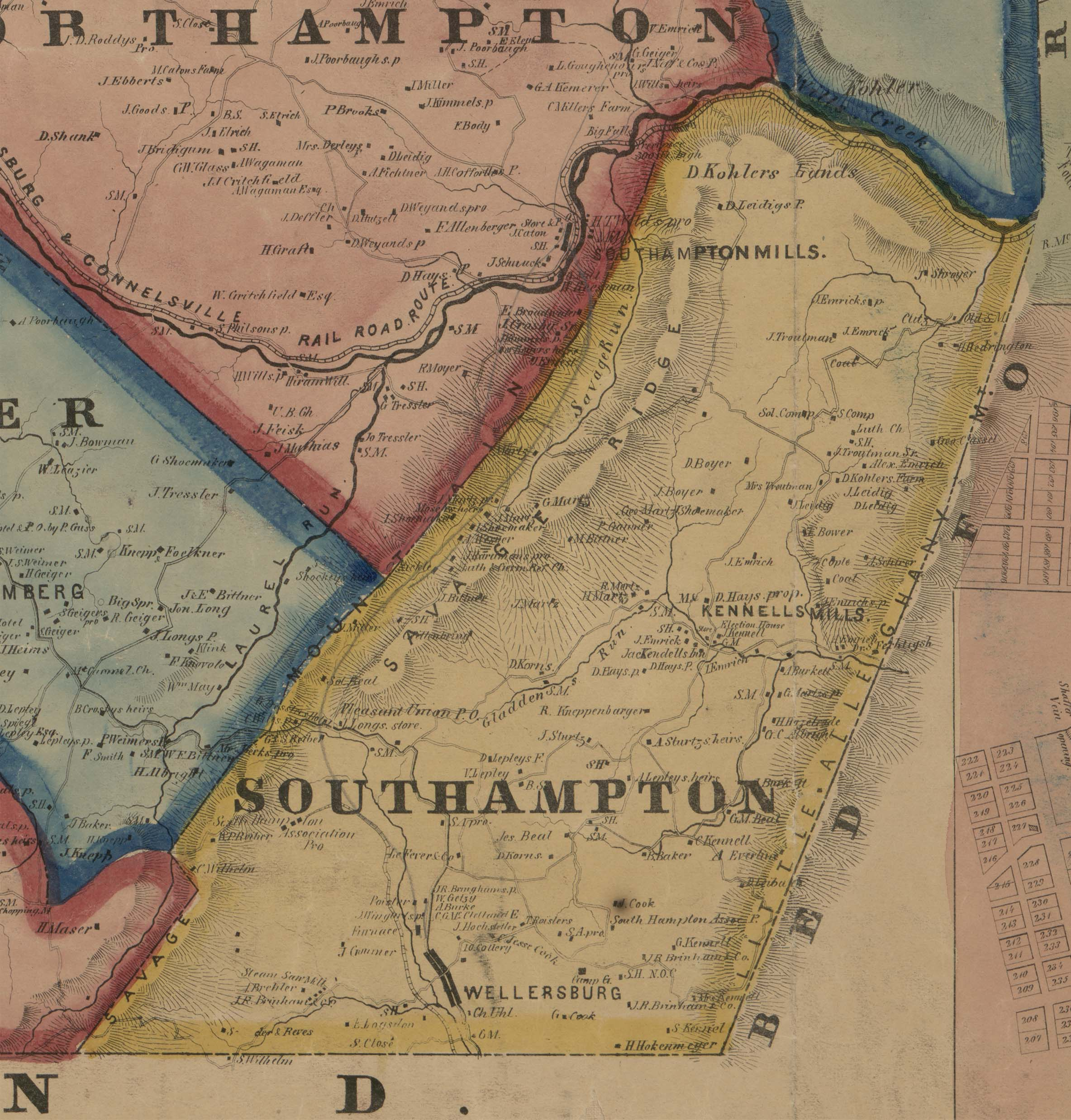
Southampton Township, Somerset County, Pennsylvania, 1860

According to the United States Census Bureau, the township has a total area of 29.4 square miles (76.0 km^{2}), all land. Southampton Township is bordered by Fairhope Township to the north, Northampton & Larimer & Greenville Townships to the west, Bedford County to the east, and Allegany County, Maryland, to the south. The borough of Wellersburg is located at the extreme southern end of the township, along its border with Maryland. Pennsylvania Route 160 passes through Southampton Township as it runs north from Wellersburg & the Maryland border and then progresses west into Larimer Township. Savage Mountain runs along the western edge of the township.

== Demographics ==
Historical population
Census	Pop.	Note	%±
2010	630		—
2020	604		−4.1%
2021 (est.)	599		−0.8%
U.S. Decennial Census

At the 2000 census there were 655 people, 239 households, and 186 families in the township. The population density was 22.3 people per square mile (8.6/km^{2}). There were 274 housing units at an average density of 9.3/sq mi (3.6/km^{2}). The racial makeup of the township was 97.86% White, 0.92% African American, 0.15% Native American, 0.15% Asian, and 0.92% from two or more races. Hispanic or Latino of any race were 0.15%.

Of the 239 households 32.2% had children under the age of 18 living with them, 70.3% were married couples living together, 4.6% had a female householder with no husband present, and 21.8% were non-families. 18.4% of households were one person and 10.0% were one person aged 65 or older. The average household size was 2.65 and the average family size was 3.02.

The age distribution was 22.6% under the age of 18, 6.9% from 18 to 24, 26.7% from 25 to 44, 25.3% from 45 to 64, and 18.5% 65 or older. The median age was 40 years. For every 100 females, there were 106.6 males. For every 100 females age 18 and over, there were 104.4 males.

The median household income was $29,167 and the median family income was $31,719. Males had a median income of $26,750 versus $21,354 for females. The per capita income for the township was $14,149. About 10.7% of families and 11.7% of the population were below the poverty line, including 20.5% of those under age 18 and 6.2% of those age 65 or over.

== Notable people ==
- John Sheridan Weller (1866–1944), attorney and politician
