= Center Rock =

American manufacturing company

Center Rock, Inc.
- Company type: Private
- Industry: Manufacturing
- Genre: Specialized drill bits
- Founded: 1998
- Founder: Brandon W. Fisher
- Headquarters: Berlin, Pennsylvania, U.S.
- Area served: Worldwide
- Key people: David Pietrzykowski (CEO)
- Website: www.centerrock.com

Center Rock, Inc. is a manufacturer of drilling equipment headquartered in Berlin, Pennsylvania. The company was founded in 1998 by Brandon W. Fisher.

Center Rock made headlines in 2002 when its equipment was instrumental in the Quecreek Mine Rescue in Pennsylvania, in which nine miners were rescued after being trapped for 78 hours in a flooded mine.

In 2010, Center Rock assisted in the rescue of 33 miners trapped for 69 days as a result of the Copiapó mining accident in Chile. The company provided a special hammer bit for the drill that enabled a rescue shaft to be completed much faster than originally anticipated.
