= Callimont, Pennsylvania =

Former Borough in Pennsylvania, US

- Former Borough
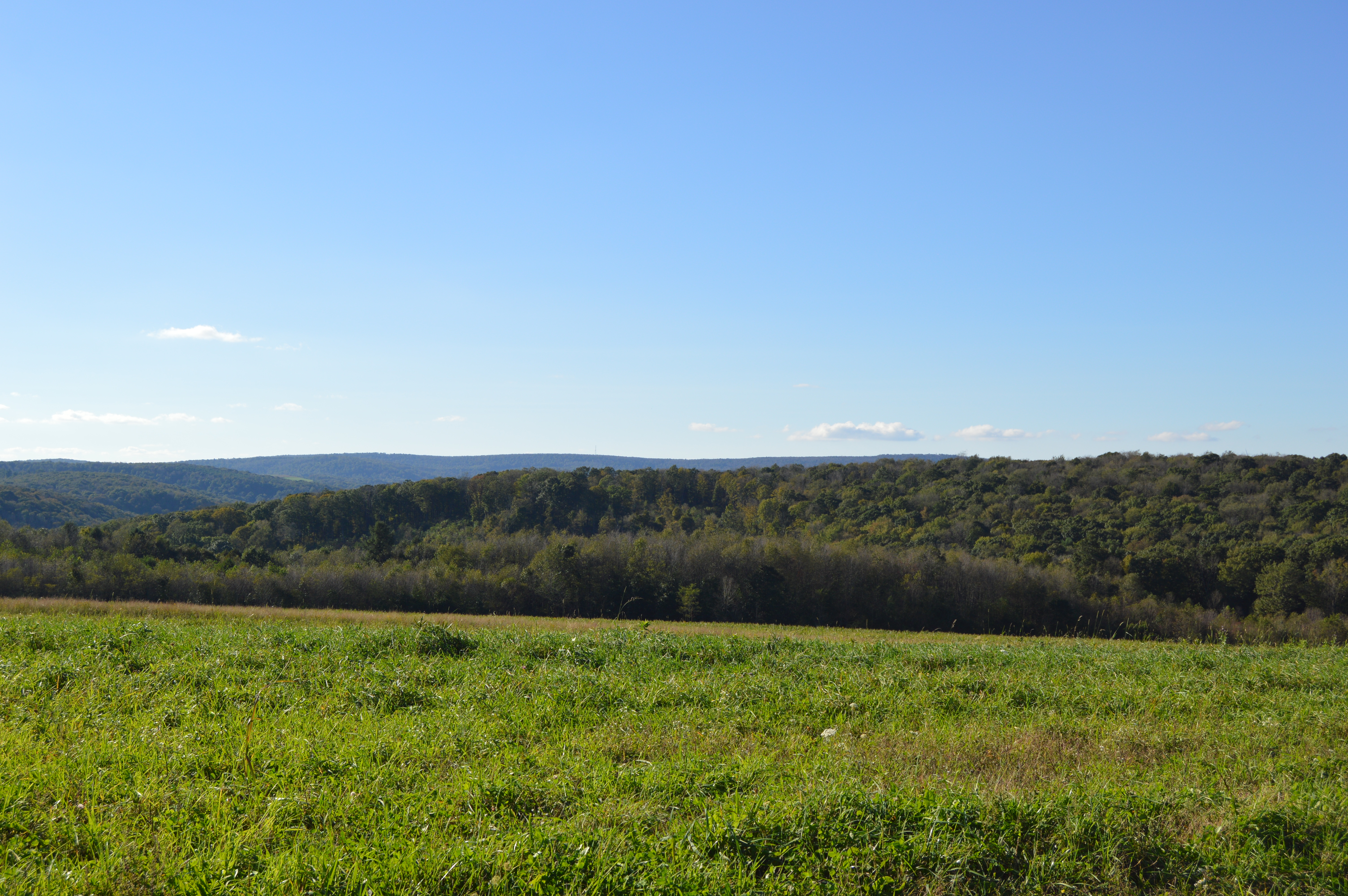
- Gameland Road

- Location of Callimont in Somerset County, Pennsylvania.
- Coordinates: 39°48′05″N 78°56′56″W
- Country: United States
- State: Pennsylvania
- County: Somerset
- Incorporated: 1972

Government
  - Type: Borough Council

Area
  - Total: 4.36 sq mi (11.28 km^{2})
  - Land: 4.36 sq mi (11.28 km^{2})
  - Water: 0 sq mi (0.00 km^{2})
- Elevation: 2,240 ft (680 m)

Population (2020)
  - Total: 56
  - Density: 12.8/sq mi (4.96/km^{2})
- Time zone: UTC-5 (Eastern (EST))
  - Summer (DST): UTC-4 (EDT)
- Area code: 814
- FIPS code: 42-10808

Callimont was a borough in Somerset County, Pennsylvania, United States. The population was 53 at the 2020 census. It is part of the Johnstown, Pennsylvania, Metropolitan Statistical Area.

== History ==
The borough was established in 1972 seceding from adjacent Larimer Township. The new borough was created by developers wanting to create a ski resort in the area. Some condominiums were built, land for the ski area was acquired, and a chairlift was constructed, but the full resort was never completed. Since then, most of the borough's services were provided by Larimer Township, including housing the space for the borough's council meetings. The borough is within the Meyersdale Area School District. In 2024, voters in both Callimont and Larimer Township approved a referendum merging the borough into the township effective January 1, 2026.

== Geography ==
Callimont is at 39°48′05″N 78°56′56″W (39.8015, -78.9488), approximately 13.5 miles (22 km) north-northwest of Cumberland, Maryland. According to the United States Census Bureau, the borough has a total area of 4.5 square miles (12 km^{2}), all land.

== Demographics ==
Historical population
Census	Pop.	Note	%±
1980	32		—
1990	55		71.9%
2000	51		−7.3%
2010	41		−19.6%
2020	56		36.6%
2021 (est.)	52	▼	−7.1%

As of the census of 2000, there were 51 people, 19 households, and 14 families living in the borough. The population density was 11.4 people per square mile (4.4/km^{2}). There were 24 housing units at an average density of 5.4 per square mile (2.1/km^{2}). The racial makeup of the borough was 100.00% White.

There were 19 households, out of which 26.3% had children under the age of 18 living with them, 57.9% were married couples living together, 21.1% had a female householder with no husband present, and 21.1% were non-families. 21.1% of all households were made up of individuals, and 5.3% had someone living alone who was 65 years of age or older. The average household size was 2.68 and the average family size was 2.87.

In the borough the population was spread out, with 21.6% under the age of 18, 13.7% from 18 to 24, 27.5% from 25 to 44, 29.4% from 45 to 64, and 7.8% who were 65 years of age or older. The median age was 35 years. For every 100 females there were 96.2 males. For every 100 females age 18 and over, there were 110.5 males.

The median income for a household in the borough was $49,750, and the median income for a family was $49,250. Males had a median income of $38,750 versus $30,000 for females. The per capita income for the borough was $19,813. There were no families and 3.8% of the population living below the poverty line, including no under eighteen and none of those over 64.
