= Pennsylvania Route 756 =

State highway in Cambria County, Pennsylvania, US

Pennsylvania Route 756

Route information
- Maintained by PennDOT
- Length: 7.19 mi (11.57 km)
- Existed: 1930–present

Major junctions
- West end: PA 403 in Johnstown
- US 219 / PA 56 in Richland Township
- East end: PA 160 in Adams Township

Location
- Country: United States
- State: Pennsylvania
- Counties: Cambria

Highway system
- Pennsylvania State Route System; Interstate; US; State; Scenic; Legislative
← PA 752	→ PA 760

Pennsylvania Route 756 (PA 756) is an east–west state route that is located in Cambria County, Pennsylvania in the United States.

Its western terminus is PA 403, which is located in the Moxham section of Johnstown, and its eastern terminus is PA 160, which is located in Elton, Adams Township.

== Route description ==
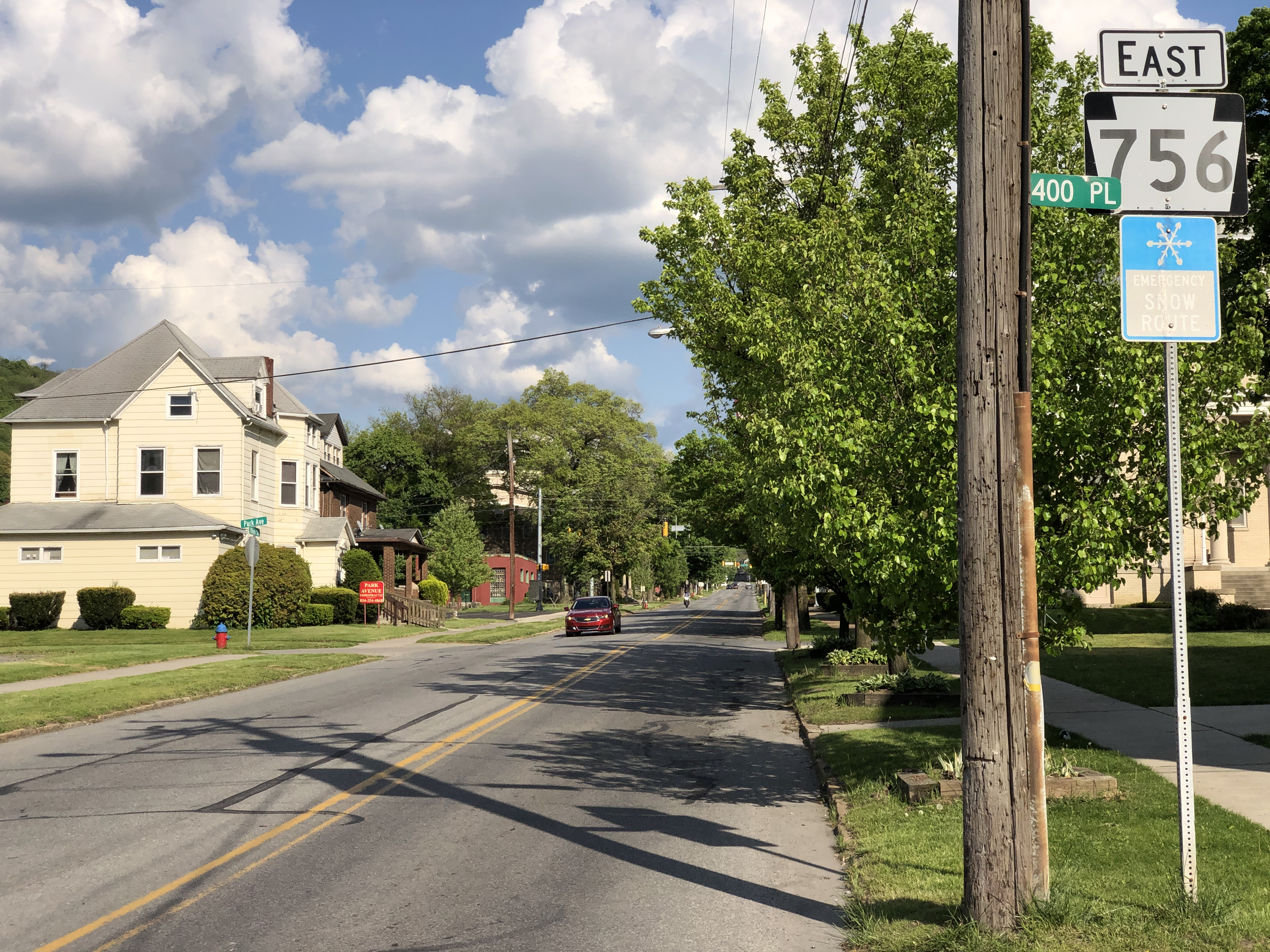
PA 756 eastbound past PA 403 in Johnstown

PA 756 begins as Ohio Street at an intersection with PA 403 in the Moxham neighborhood of the city of Johnstown.

In the borough of Geistown, Bentwood Avenue meets PA 756. PA 756 then makes a left turn onto Belmont Street. At the intersection with Bedford Street and Scalp Avenue, commonly known as the Geistown Cloverleaf, PA 756 makes a right turn.

In Richland Township, PA 756 interchanges with US 219/PA 56. The eastern terminus is located in Elton, Adams Township at PA 160.

== Major intersections ==
The entire route is in Cambria County.

Location	mi	km	Destinations	Notes
Johnstown	0.0	0.0	PA 403 (Central Avenue)	Western terminus
Richland Township	4.6	7.4	US 219 / PA 56 – Somerset, Ebensburg, Johnstown, Windber	Interchange
Adams Township	7.2	11.6	PA 160 – Ebensburg, Windber	Eastern terminus
1.000 mi = 1.609 km; 1.000 km = 0.621 mi

== Attractions ==
- Richland Towne Centre (former location of Richland Mall) located near the US 219/PA 56 interchange
