= Berlin, Pennsylvania =

Borough in Pennsylvania, US

- Borough
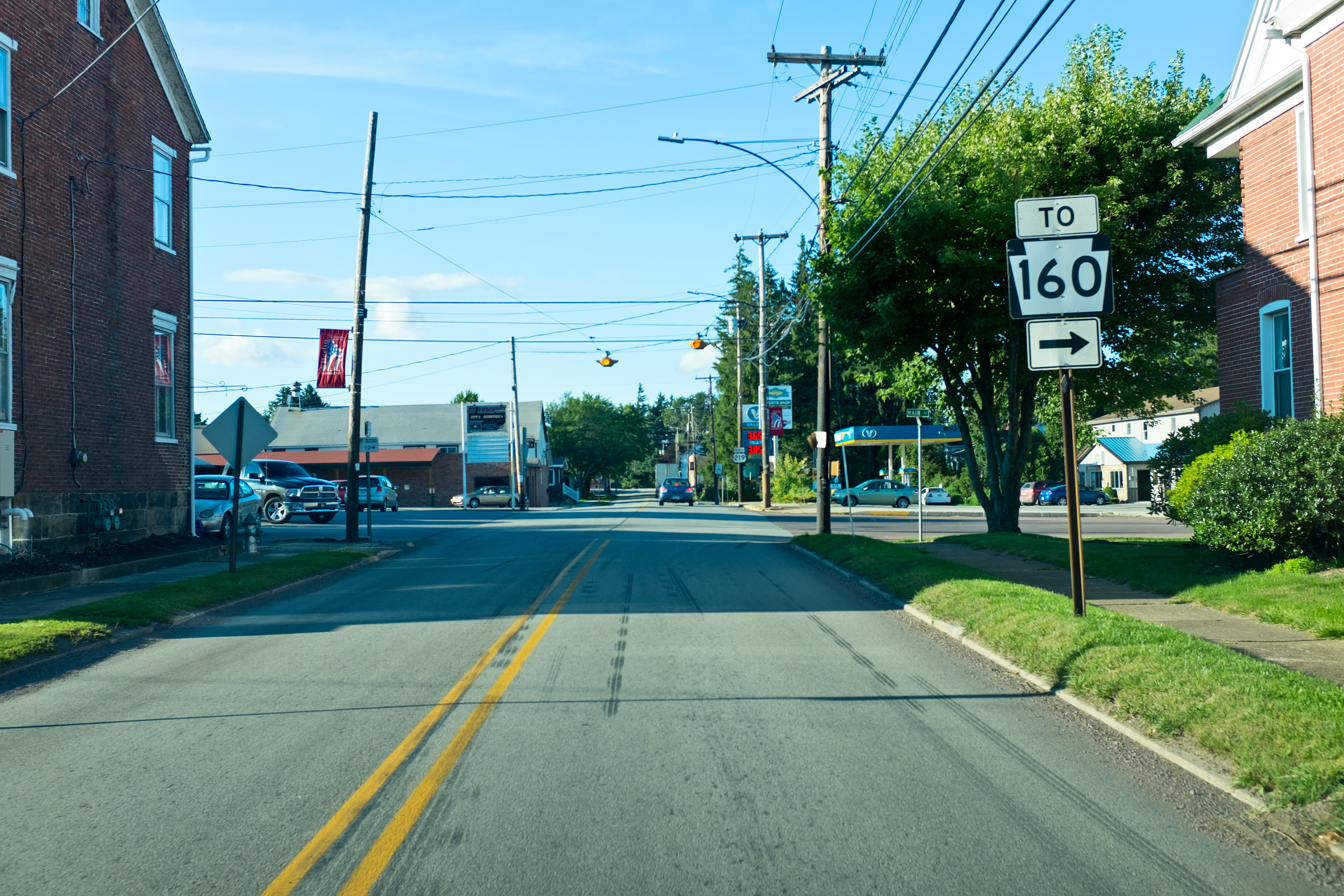
- Berlin, Pennsylvania

- Location of Berlin in Somerset County, Pennsylvania.

- Location within Pennsylvania Location within the United States
- Coordinates: 39°55′17″N 78°57′00″W
- Country: United States
- State: Pennsylvania
- County: Somerset
- Settled: 1784
- Incorporated: February 7, 1833

Government
  - Type: Borough Council

Area
  - Total: 0.92 sq mi (2.37 km^{2})
  - Land: 0.92 sq mi (2.37 km^{2})
  - Water: 0 sq mi (0.00 km^{2})
- Elevation: 2,323 ft (708 m)

Population (2020)
  - Total: 2,003
  - Density: 2,187.6/sq mi (844.63/km^{2})
- Time zone: UTC-5 (Eastern (EST))
  - Summer (DST): UTC-4 (EDT)
- Zip code: 15530
- Area codes: 582/814
- FIPS code: 42-05776
- Website: https://berlinborough.org/

Berlin is a borough located approximately 75 miles southeast of Pittsburgh in Somerset County, Pennsylvania, United States. The population was 2,004 at the 2020 census. It is part of the Johnstown, Pennsylvania Metropolitan Statistical Area.

The town's major celebration each fall concerns the Whiskey Rebellion in the 1790s, although in recent years residents also commemorate the termination of Flight 93 in nearby Shanksville in 2001. The Berlin Fife and Drum Corps is one of the oldest such bands in North America. Snyder of Berlin potato chips are made in town, which also hosts Center Rock, Inc., a drilling-equipment manufacturer. Farming and coal mining have long been important in the area.

It is not located near East Berlin in Adams County, or New Berlin in Union County. East Berlin was previously called Berlin but had to have the "East" added to avoid confusion with this Berlin.

== History ==
Immigrants (especially those from Germany) began settling the area before the American Revolutionary War, and the surrounding Brothersvalley Township was incorporated in 1771. Further settlement occurred by Revolutionary War veterans, so the borough was laid out in 1784 and formally incorporated on February 7, 1833.

In June 1794, a riot occurred at the Berlin Schoolhouse during the Whiskey Rebellion. By September, Irish immigrant Robert Philson raised a liberty pole at his log store on the square and advised citizens to oppose U.S. laws. Federal troops arrived in October, and the rebellion evaporated, with Philson and itinerant preacher Herman Husband being taken to Philadelphia for trial (where they were acquitted). Governor Thomas Mifflin made his headquarters in Dr. Christian Boerstler's house.

Local attorney Jeremiah S. Black rose to become Justice of Pennsylvania (1851–1857, serving as Chief Justice from 1851 to 1853). After election of fellow Pennsylvanian James Buchanan as President of the United States, he began litigating fraudulent land claims in California as United States Attorney General and later served as Secretary of State.

== Geography ==
Berlin is located approximately 11 miles (18 km) southeast of Somerset and approximately 63 miles (101 km) south-southwest of Altoona. According to the United States Census Bureau, the borough has a total area of 0.9 square miles (2.3 km^{2}), all land. Berlin has an elevation of 2,323 feet (708 m), the second highest, after only Seven Springs, in Pennsylvania.

== Demographics ==
Historical population
Census	Pop.	Note	%±
1800	294		—
1810	330		12.2%
1820	382		15.8%
1840	524		—
1850	665		26.9%
1860	643		−3.3%
1870	640		−0.5%
1880	728		13.8%
1890	912		25.3%
1900	1,030		12.9%
1910	1,336		29.7%
1920	1,563		17.0%
1930	1,393		−10.9%
1940	1,602		15.0%
1950	1,507		−5.9%
1960	1,600		6.2%
1970	1,766		10.4%
1980	1,999		13.2%
1990	2,064		3.3%
2000	2,192		6.2%
2010	2,104		−4.0%
2020	2,003		−4.8%
2021 (est.)	1,987	▼	−0.8%

At the 2000 census there were 2,192 people, 881 households, and 577 families residing in the borough. The population density was 2,420.0 inhabitants per square mile (934.4/km^{2}). There were 940 housing units at an average density of 1,037.8 per square mile (400.7/km^{2}). The racial makeup of the borough was 99.54% White, 0.05% African American, 0.32% Asian, 0.05% from other races, and 0.05% from two or more races. Hispanic or Latino of any race were 0.18%.

Of the 881 households, 29.4% had children under the age of 18 living with them, 53.8% were married couples living together, 8.7% had a female householder with no husband present, and 34.4% were non-families. 30.9% of households were one person, and 15.0% were one person aged 65 or older. The average household size was 2.31 and the average family size was 2.90.

In the borough the population was spread out, with 22.1% under the age of 18, 6.7% from 18 to 24, 26.6% from 25 to 44, 21.6% from 45 to 64, and 23.0% 65 or older. The median age was 41 years. For every 100 females there were 83.7 males. For every 100 females age 18 and over, there were 77.3 males.

The median household income was $29,219 and the median family income was $35,714. Males had a median income of $27,763 versus $20,156 for females. The per capita income for the borough was $15,614. About 5.9% of families and 10.0% of the population were below the poverty line, including 6.3% of those under age 18 and 12.5% of those age 65 or over.

== Education ==
It is in the Berlin Brothersvalley School District.

== See also ==
- East Berlin, Pennsylvania
