= Wellersburg, Pennsylvania =

Borough in Pennsylvania, US

- Borough
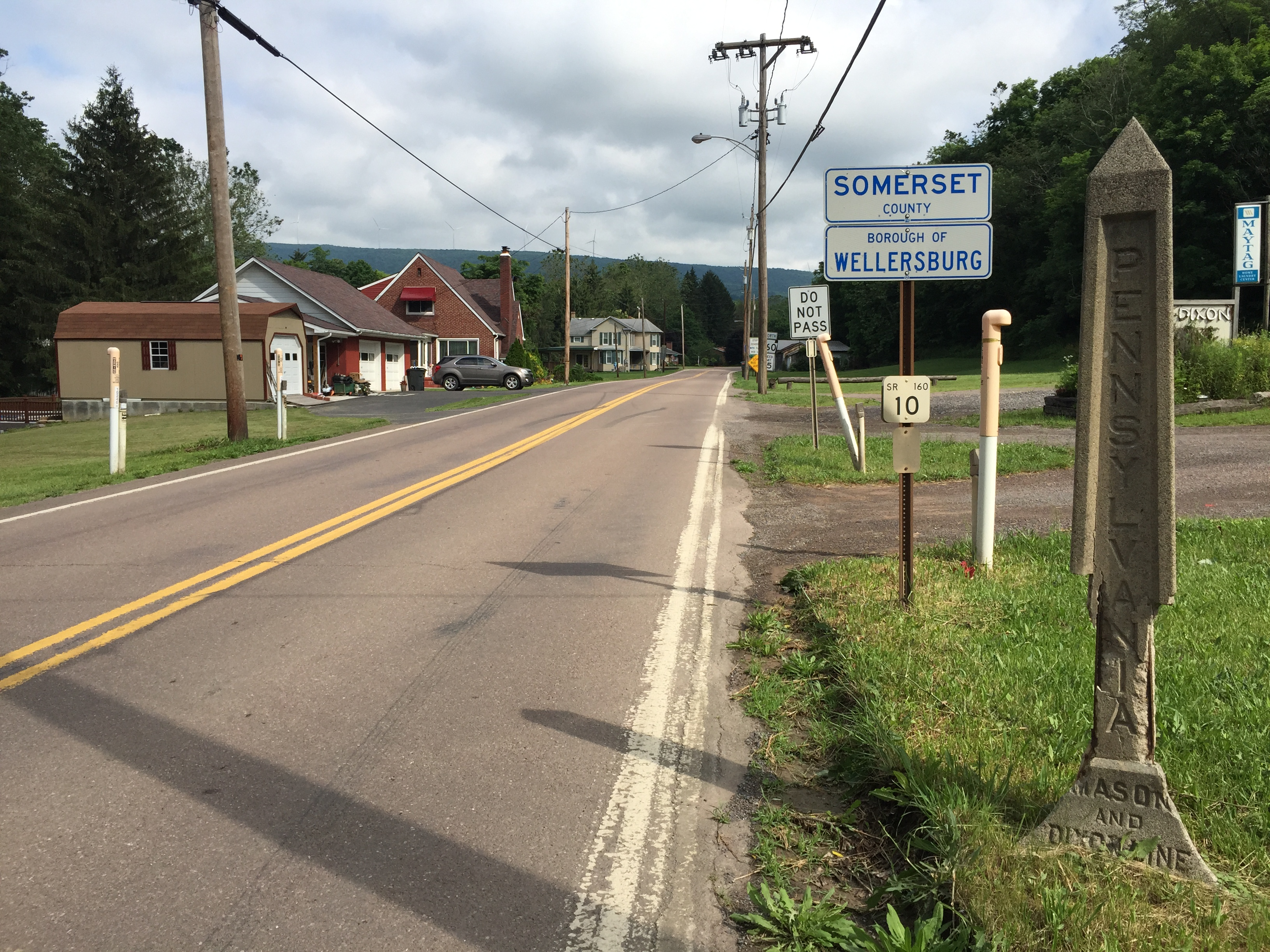
- Entering Wellersburg from Maryland

- Location of Wellersburg in Somerset County, Pennsylvania.

- Location within Pennsylvania
- Coordinates: 39°43′50″N 78°50′53″W
- Country: United States
- State: Pennsylvania
- County: Somerset
- Settled: 1830
- Incorporated: 1857

Government
  - Type: Borough Council

Area
  - Total: 0.81 sq mi (2.10 km^{2})
  - Land: 0.81 sq mi (2.10 km^{2})
  - Water: 0 sq mi (0.00 km^{2})
- Elevation: 1,348 ft (411 m)

Population (2020)
  - Total: 210 ▲
  - Estimate (2021): 208
  - Density: 211.1/sq mi (81.49/km^{2})
- Time zone: UTC-5 (Eastern (EST))
  - Summer (DST): UTC-4 (EDT)
- ZIP code: 15564
- Area code: 814
- FIPS code: 42-82128
- GNIS feature ID: 1215601

Wellersburg is a borough that is located in Somerset County, Pennsylvania, United States. It is part of the Johnstown, Pennsylvania, Metropolitan Statistical Area.

As of the 2020 census, Wellersburg had a population of 214.

== Geography ==
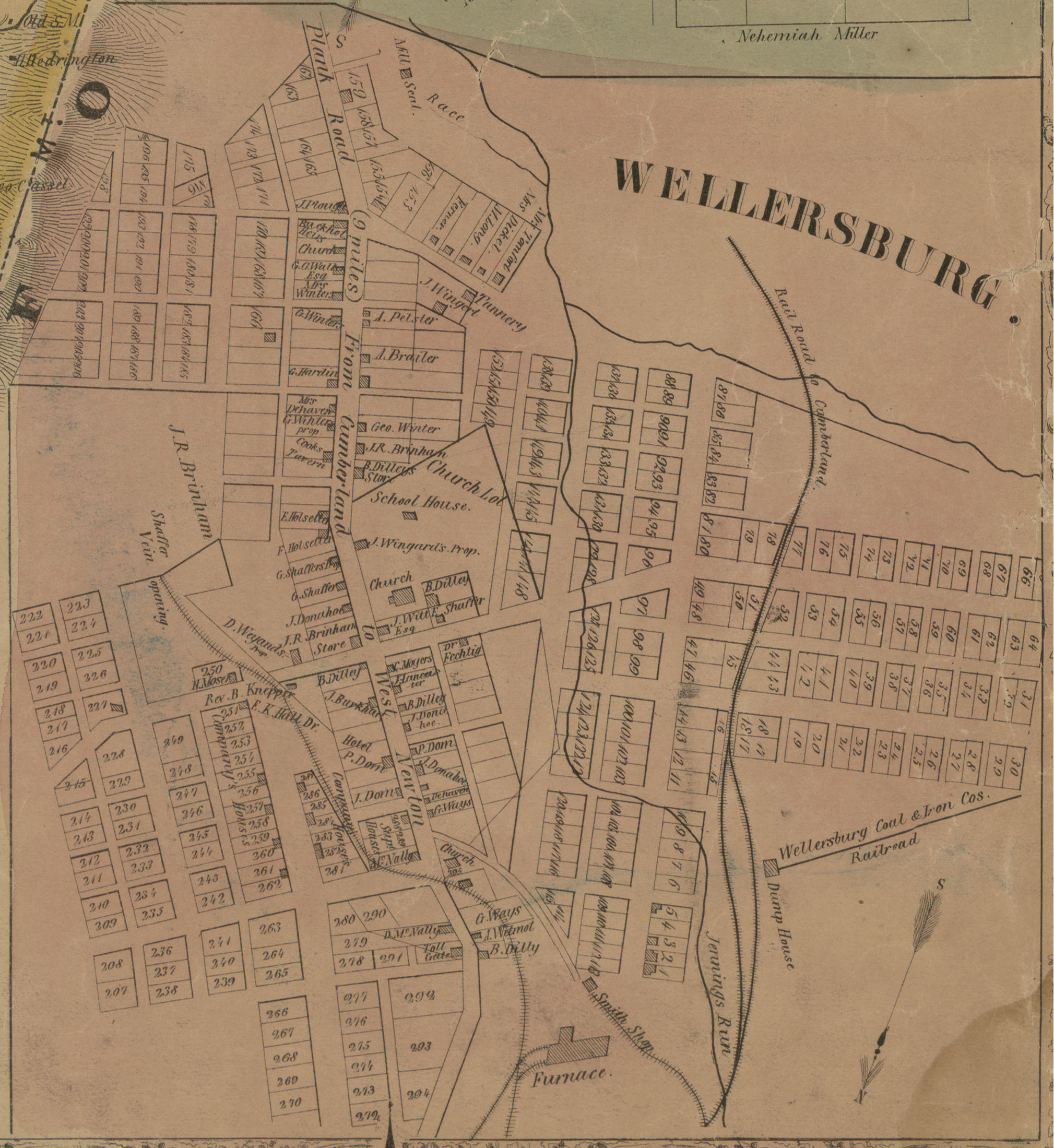
Wellersburg, Somerset County, Pennsylvania, 1860 (note orientation of map: north at bottom)

Wellersburg is located at the extreme southern end of Southampton Township, along its border with Maryland.

Pennsylvania Route 160 passes through Wellersburg as it runs between the Maryland border to the south and Southampton Township to the north.

According to the United States Census Bureau, the borough has a total area of 0.8 square miles (2.1 km^{2}), all land.

== Demographics ==
Historical population
Census	Pop.	Note	%±
1860	465		—
1870	290		−37.6%
1880	226		−22.1%
1890	183		−19.0%
1900	158		−13.7%
1910	193		22.2%
1920	247		28.0%
1930	315		27.5%
1940	357		13.3%
1950	369		3.4%
1960	303		−17.9%
1970	266		−12.2%
1980	265		−0.4%
1990	213		−19.6%
2000	176		−17.4%
2010	181		2.8%
2020	214		18.2%
2021 (est.)	208	▼	−2.8%

At the time of the 2000 census, there were 176 people residing in eighty-four households in the borough, including fifty-one families.

The population density was 223.4 inhabitants per square mile (86.3/km^{2}). There were ninety housing units at an average density of 114.2 per square mile (44.1/km^{2}).

The racial makeup of the borough was 98.86% White, and 1.14% from two or more races.

Of the eighty-four households that were documented during the census, 15.5% had children who were under the age of eighteen living with them, 45.2% were married couples living together, 10.7% had a female householder with no husband present, and 38.1% were non-families. Additionally, 36.9% of households were one-person and 17.9% were one-person households with someone living alone who was aged sixty-five or older.

The average household size was 2.10 and the average family size was 2.63.

The age distribution of residents was 15.9% who were under the age of eighteen, 6.8% who were aged eighteen to twenty-four, 28.4% who were aged twenty-five to forty-four, 27.3% who were aged forty-five to sixty-four, and 21.6% who were aged sixty-five or older. The median age was forty-four years.

For every one hundred females, there were 83.3 males. For every one hundred females who were aged eighteen or older, there were 87.3 males.

The median household income was $21,111 and the median family income was $23,750. Males had a median income of $24,688 compared with that of $18,750 for females.

The per capita income for the borough was $14,495.

Approximately 4.3% of families and 5.4% of the population were living below the poverty line, including those who were aged sixty-five or older. No one under the age of eighteen was reported as living in poverty.
