= List of European archaeological sites on the National Register of Historic Places in Pennsylvania =

This is a list of European archaeological sites on the National Register of Historic Places in Pennsylvania.

Historic sites in the United States qualify to be listed on the National Register of Historic Places by passing one or more of four different criteria; Criterion D permits the inclusion of proven and potential archaeological sites. Approximately one hundred different sites in Pennsylvania are listed under this criterion, including both Native American and European sites. This list includes all properties in Pennsylvania that qualify under Criterion D due to the presence of European artifacts.

== Sites ==
	Landmark name	Image	Location	County	Comments
1	Allegheny Aqueduct		Robeson Township: Pennsylvania Route 724 and Allegheny Creek at Gibraltar; 40°17′10″N 75°53′13″W	Berks	A section of the Schuylkill Canal
2	Alliance Furnace		Perry Township: off Township 568 at Jacob's Creek, northeast of Perryopolis; 40°6′45″N 79°43′3″W	Fayette	Remnants of a blast furnace complex
3	Barree Forge and Furnace		Porter Township: 2 miles (3.2 km) north of Alexandria along the Juniata River; 40°35′18″N 78°6′4″W	Huntingdon	Remnants of a blast furnace complex
4	Beaver Historic District		Beaver: roughly bounded by the Cumberland and Pennsylvania Railroad tracks, Fair Ave., 5th St., 3rd St., and Sassafras Ln. 40°41′41″N 80°18′27″W	Beaver	Includes the site of Fort McIntosh
5	Boswell Historic District		Boswell: roughly bounded by Hower Ave., Atkinson Way, Quemahoning Creek, Main St., and Juniata St.	Somerset	Coal mining company town
6	Bradys Bend Iron Company Furnaces		Bradys Bend Township: Pennsylvania Route 68 in Bradys Bend; 40°59′55″N 79°37′34″W	Armstrong	Remnants of a blast furnace complex
7	George Brinton House		Birmingham Township: Pennsylvania Route 100, 1 mile north of its junction with U.S. Route 1, near Chadds Ford; 39°52′51″N 75°35′56″W	Chester	Includes artifacts of the Battle of Brandywine
8	John Brown Tannery Site		Richmond Township: 500 feet south of the junction of Pennsylvania Route 77 and Lyons Rd. at New Richmond; 41°43′8.5″N 79°57′3″W	Crawford	Ruins of a tannery operated by abolitionist John Brown
9	Brown-Moore Blacksmith Shop		Luzerne Township: 0.1 miles (0.16 km) west of Pennsylvania Route 4020; 39°58′23″N 79°53′55″W	Fayette	Well-preserved early nineteenth-century blacksmith shop
10	Jeremiah Burns Farm		Washington Township: 10988 Fish and Game Rd. 39°45′58.464″N 77°31′47.46″W	Franklin	Includes an early sawmill and log cabin site
11	Cairnbrook Historic District		Shade Township: roughly bounded by the Penn Central railroad tracks, McGregor Ave., Windber Ave., and John St. 40°7′20″N 78°48′59″W	Somerset	Coal mining company town
12	Chad House		Chadds Ford Township: Pennsylvania Route 100; 39°52′29″N 75°35′31″W	Delaware	Includes artifacts of the Battle of Brandywine
13	Chester Creek Historic District		Thornbury Township: north, east, and south of Glen Mills along the western branch of Chester Creek; 39°55′23″N 75°29′27″W	Delaware	Includes multiple early industrial sites
14	Chickies Historic District		East Donegal and West Hempfield Townships: roughly bounded by the Susquehanna River, Chickies Creek, Bank Street, and Long Lane, near Marietta	Lancaster	Includes an early mill site
15	Codorus Forge and Furnace Historic District		Hellam Township: junction of River Farm and Furnace Rds., southeast of Saginaw; 40°3′5″N 76°39′26″W	York	Remnants of a blast furnace complex
16	Crosley-Garrett Mill Workers' Housing, Store and Mill Site		Newtown Township: Paper Mill Rd. and St. David's Rd. 40°1′9″N 75°24′16″W	Delaware	Industrial company town
17	Dale Furnace and Forge Historic District		Washington Township: Forgedale Rd. northwest of Bally; 40°25′21″N 75°37′1″W	Berks	Remnants of a blast furnace complex
18	Dreibelbis Mill		Perry Township: junction of Dreibelbis Mill and Bellevue Rds. 40°30′22″N 75°57′23″W	Berks	Nineteenth-century gristmill
19	Dykeman's Spring		Shippensburg: Dykeman Rd., 0.25 miles (0.40 km) east of Pennsylvania Route 696; 40°2′33″N 77°30′57″W	Cumberland	Includes military artifacts from the Civil War; also includes a Native American site
20	Etna Furnace		Catharine Township: north of Williamsburg — roughly the area south and east of the bend of the Frankstown Branch Juniata River at Mount Etna; 40°31′34″N 78°11′11″W	Blair	Remnants of a blast furnace complex
21	Forks of the Ohio		Pittsburgh: Point Park; 40°26′27″N 80°0′37″W	Allegheny	Includes the site of Fort Pitt
22	Fort Hunter Historic District		Susquehanna Township: U.S. Route 22; 40°20′29″N 76°54′30″W	Dauphin	Includes the site of Fort Hunter, built in the 1750s
23	Fort McIntosh Site		Beaver: on a bluff overlooking the Ohio River, along River Rd. between College and Dravo Aves. 40°41′27.35″N 80°18′14.75″W	Beaver	Site of the first U.S. Army fort north of the Ohio River
24	Gettysburg National Military Park		Cumberland, Highland, and Straban Townships: Gettysburg National Military Park, near Gettysburg; 39°48′43″N 77°14′39″W	Adams	Site of the Battle of Gettysburg
25	Geiger Mill		Robeson Township: junction of Mill Rd. and Pennsylvania Route 82 in Geiger; 40°12′0″N 75°50′15″W	Berks	Late eighteenth-century gristmill
26	Greenwood Furnace		Jackson Township: Pennsylvania Route 305 in Greenwood Furnace State Park, east of McAlevys Fort; 40°38′48″N 77°46′41″W	Huntingdon	Remnants of a blast furnace complex
27	Guldin Mill		Maidencreek Township: off Pennsylvania Route 73 southeast of its junction with U.S. Route 222; 40°26′8″N 75°52′42″W	Berks	Early nineteenth-century gristmill
28	Holicong Village Historic District		Buckingham Township: U.S. Route 202 and Holicong Rd. at Holicong; 40°20′9″N 75°2′55″W	Bucks	Eighteenth-century village
29	Hower-Slote House		Lewis Township: west of Turbotville; 41°6′6″N 76°47′45″W	Northumberland	Includes part of the site of Fort Freeland, built during the American Revolutionary War
30	Independence National Historical Park		Philadelphia: bounded by Walnut, 6th, Chestnut, and 2nd Sts. 39°56′52″N 75°8′53″W	Philadelphia	Includes Independence Hall
31	Irwintown Site		Spring Creek Township: northern bank of the Allegheny River, above Hallton; 41°24′3″N 78°54′23″W	Elk	Remains of a nineteenth-century logging town
32	Jacobsburg Historic District		Bushkill Township: 3 miles (4.8 km) northeast of Nazareth off Pennsylvania Route 115; 40°46′57″N 75°17′34″W	Northampton	Eighteenth-century industrial village
33	Nicholas Johnson Mill		Colebrookdale Township: Mill Crest Rd. 40°20′58″N 75°37′12″W	Berks	Nineteenth-century gristmill
34	Kauffman Mill		Upper Bern Township: junction of Mill and Mill Hill Rds. 40°31′30″N 76°3′47″W	Berks	Late eighteenth-century gristmill
35	Kise Mill Bridge Historic District		Newberry Township: junction of Kise Mill and Roxberry Rds., east of Lewisberry; 40°6′59.5″N 76°48′35.9″W	York	Remnants of an early nineteenth-century industrial complex
36	Knabb-Bieber Mill		Oley Township: Bieber Mill Rd. at Monocacy Creek; 40°21′33″N 75°48′38″W	Berks	Early nineteenth-century gristmill
37	Knipe-Johnson Farm		Upper Gwynedd Township: 606 DeKalb Pike; 40°13′2″N 75°15′4″W	Montgomery	Includes sites of late eighteenth-century agricultural buildings
38	Lehigh Canal: Eastern Section Glendon and Abbott Street Industrial Sites		Easton: Lehigh River from Hopeville to its confluence with the Delaware River, west of 40°39′24″N 75°17′41″W	Northampton	A section of the Lehigh Canal
39	Legionville		Harmony Township: between the Ohio River and Duss Ave., north of its intersection with Legionville Rd. and south of its intersection with Anthony Wayne Dr. 40°37′16″N 80°13′42″W	Beaver	Site of the first official U.S. Army training camp
40	Locust Grove		Conoy Township: south of Bainbridge off Pennsylvania Route 441; 40°4′44″N 76°39′38″W	Lancaster	Late eighteenth-century farmhouse
41	Israel and Samuel Lupfer Tannery Site and House		Jackson and Toboyne Townships: Black Hollow Rd. 40°16′54.4″N 77°32′1.6″W	Perry	Remnants of a nineteenth-century tannery
42	Mill Creek Historic District		Lower Merion Township: near and east of Bryn Mawr; also roughly bounded by the Schuylkill River, Mill Creek, and Righter's Mill, Rose Glen, and Monk's Rds. 40°1′32″N 75°17′8″W	Montgomery	Includes multiple eighteenth-century industrial complexes
43	Millmont Farm		Montgomery Township: east of Mercersburg at the junction of Pennsylvania Routes 16 and 416; 39°48′16″N 77°52′24″W	Franklin	Includes a late eighteenth-century gristmill
44	Minersville Coke Ovens		Carbon Township: Pennsylvania Route 913, 1 mile (1.6 km) east of Coalmont; 40°13′0″N 78°11′3″W	Huntingdon	A complex of coke ovens
45	Monroe Furnace		Barree Township: junction of Pennsylvania Route 26 and Legislative Route 31076, 6 miles (9.7 km) northwest of McAlevys Fort; 40°41′43″N 77°53′41″W	Huntingdon	Remnants of a blast furnace complex
46	Mount Hope Estate		Penn and Rapho Townships: northwest of Manheim on Pennsylvania Route 72; also roughly along Shearer's Creek, east of Mansion House Rd. and north of the Pennsylvania Turnpike; 40°13′37″N 76°25′47″W	Lancaster	Includes remnants of a blast furnace complex
47	Muddy Creek Forks Historic District		East Hopewell, Fawn, and Lower Chanceford Townships: junction of Muddy Creek Forks and New Park Rds. at Muddy Creek Forks; 39°48′27″N 76°28′31″W	York	Includes the remnants of an eighteenth-century mill complex
48	Jacob Nicholas House		Easton: 458 Ferry St. 40°41′22″N 75°12′47″W	Northampton	One of six buildings in Easton built before the American Revolution
49	North Warwick Historic and Archeological District		Warwick Township: Pennsylvania Route 345 and Harmonyville, Bethesda, Hopewell, Piersol, Trythall, and Northside Rds. 40°11′18″N 75°46′8″W	Chester	Includes eighteenth- and nineteenth-century industrial complexes; also includes a Native American site
50	Pennsbury Manor		Falls Township: on the Delaware River south of Bordentown Rd. 40°8′0″N 74°46′12″W	Bucks	Site of the home of William Penn
51	Pennsylvania Canal Guard Lock and Feeder Dam, Raystown Branch		Henderson Township: 2.5 miles (4.0 km) east of Huntingdon, south of U.S. Route 22 on the Juniata River; 40°26′59″N 77°58′9″W	Huntingdon	A section of the Pennsylvania Canal
52	The Printzhof		Tinicum Township: Taylor Ave. and 2nd St. in Essington; 39°51′40″N 75°18′11″W	Delaware	Site of a leading building of New Sweden
53	Rice's Landing Historic District		Rices Landing: roughly bounded by the Monongahela River and Water, 2nd, Bayard, Carmichael, High, Main, and Ferry, including Pumpkin Run Peak; 39°56′57″N 80°0′0″W	Greene	Includes remains of nineteenth-century industrial buildings
54	Ridley Creek State Park		Edgmont Township: northwest of Media between Pennsylvania Routes 3 and 352; 39°57′13″N 75°26′41″W	Delaware	Comprises multiple former farms as old as the late seventeenth century
55	Robertsdale Historic District		Wood Township: roughly bounded by the USGS 1840 contour line and S. Main, Wood, Lincoln, Cliff, and Cherry Sts., in Robertsdale; 40°11′1″N 78°6′45″W	Huntingdon	Coal mining company town
56	Robesonia Furnace Historic District		Robesonia: Furnace, S. Church, and Freeman Sts. and Mountain and E. Meadow Aves. 40°20′34″N 76°8′26″W	Berks	Remnants of a blast furnace complex
57	Rock Hill Farm		Montgomery Township: 12995 and 12755 Bain Rd. near Mercersburg; 39°45′7″N 77°52′8″W	Franklin	Includes the ruins of an early seventeenth-century outbuilding
58	Saltsburg Historic District		Saltsburg: roughly west of Plum and Walnut Alleys to the Kiskiminetas River; 40°29′2″N 79°27′4″W	Indiana	Includes a segment of the Pennsylvania Canal
59	Shade Furnace Archaeological District		Shade Township: north of Rockingham above Dark Shade Creek; 40°9′11.22″N 78°49′41.88″W	Somerset	Remnants of a blast furnace complex
60	Siegfried's Dale Farm		Maxatawny Township: Siegfried's Rd. 40°32′58″N 75°43′23″W	Berks	A cluster of eighteenth-century farms
61	Slickville Historic District		Salem Township: roughly bounded by Greenburg and 2nd Aves. and Delmont, Court, Cottage and Fred Sts., in Slickville; 40°27′27″N 79°31′23″W	Westmoreland	Coal mining company town
62	Smock Historic District		Franklin and Menallen Townships: roughly bounded by Redstone Cemetery, Colonial Mine No. 1, Smock Hill, Colonial Mine No. 2, and Redstone Creek at Smock; 39°59′58″N 79°47′5″W	Fayette	Coal mining company town
63	Sommerheim Park Archaeological District		Millcreek Township: on bluffs above Sommerheim Dr. and Presque Isle Bay; 42°6′49″N 80°8′42″W	Erie	Includes a nineteenth-century trash heap, plus multiple Native American sites
64	Upper Roxborough Historic District		Philadelphia and Whitemarsh Township: roughly bounded by Shawmont Ave., Hagy's Mill Rd., and the Schuylkill River; 40°3′29″N 75°15′6″W	Montgomery, Philadelphia	Includes the remnants of eighteenth-century industrial complexes
65	Robert Wilson House		East Fallowfield Township: Strasburg Rd. near Coatesville; 39°57′9″N 75°50′32″W	Chester	Includes an early nineteenth-century tannery
66	Yoder Mill		Pike Township: Yoder Rd. at Oysterville Creek; 40°23′48″N 75°43′14″W	Berks	Nineteenth-century gristmill
67	York Iron Company Mine		North Codorus Township: north of Green Valley Rd., south of Spring Grove; 39°50′29″N 76°48′35″W	York	Remnants of a nineteenth-century iron mine

== See also ==
- National Register of Historic Places listings in Pennsylvania
- List of Native American archaeological sites on the National Register of Historic Places in Pennsylvania
