= Jean-Baptiste-Antoine =

Jean-Baptiste-Antoine is a French masculine given name. Notable people with the name include:

== People ==
- Jean-Baptiste-Antoine Ferland (1805–1865), French Canadian historian
- Jean-Baptiste-Antoine Guillemet, birth name of Antoine Guillemet (1843–1918), French painter
- Jean-Baptiste-Antoine Lassus, birth name of Jean-Baptiste Lassus (1807–1857), French architect
- Jean-Baptiste-Antoine Suard (1732–1817), French writer, translator and man of letters

== See also ==
- Anatole Jean-Baptiste Antoine de Barthélemy (1821–1904), French archaeologist and numismatist
- Antoine de Saint-Exupéry (1900–1944; born Antoine Marie Jean-Baptiste Roger, vicomte de Saint-Exupéry), French writer, poet, journalist and aviator
- Antoine Jean-Baptiste (born 1991), French footballer
- Antoine Jean-Baptiste Thomas (1791–1834), French painter and lithographer
- Dominique Antoine Magaud (1817–1899; third name Jean-Baptiste), French painter and muralist
- Jean-Baptiste Alary (1811–1899; middle name Antoine), French photographer
- Jean Baptiste Antoine Auget de Montyon (1733–1820), French lawyer, philanthropist and politician
- Jean-Baptiste Antoine Blatin (1841–1911), French politician
- Jean Baptiste Antoine Guillemin (1796–1842), French botanist
- Jean-Baptiste Biaggi (1918–2009; third name Antoine), French activist, lawyer, politician and soldier
- Jean Baptiste Colbert, Marquis of Seignelay (1651–1690; middle name Antoine), French politician
- Jean-Baptiste de Latil (1761–1839; third name Antoine), French ecclesiastic
- Jean-Baptiste Delettrez (1816–1887; born Antoine Jean-Baptiste Delettrez), French clockmaker
- Jean-Baptiste Lamarck (1744–1829; born Jean-Baptiste Pierre Antoine de Monet, chevalier de Lamarck), French naturalist, biologist, academic and soldier
- Louis Antoine Cambray-Digny (1751–1822; born Louis Antoine Jean Baptiste de Cambray-Digny), French officer and military personnel
- Marcellin Marbot (1782–1854; born Jean-Baptiste Antoine Marcelin Marbot), French general and military writer
- Jean-Antoine
- Jean-Baptiste
