= Jacob Leiby Farm =

- U.S. National Register of Historic Places
- U.S. Historic district
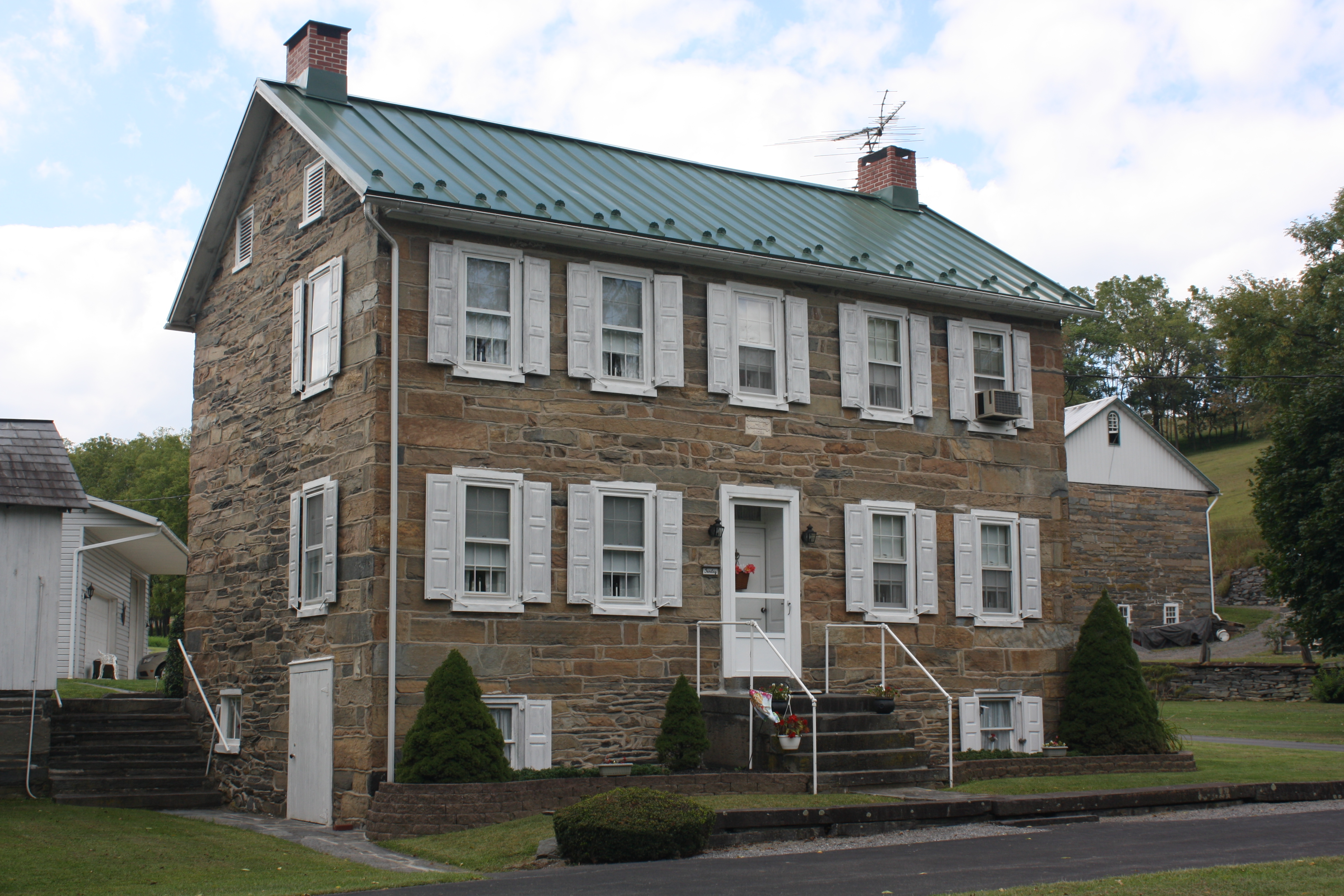
- Jacob Leiby Farm Farmhouse. September 2013.

- Location within Pennsylvania Location within the United States
- Location: PA 143, Perry Township, Pennsylvania
- Coordinates: 40°32′00″N 75°52′47.2″W
- Area: 92 acres (37 ha)
- Built: 1829
- Built by: Jacob Leiby
- Architectural style: Federal, Vernacular Federal
- MPS: Farms in Berks County MPS
- NRHP reference No.: 92000936
- Added to NRHP: July 29, 1992

The Jacob Leiby Farm is an historic farm complex, Pennsylvania Bluestone quarry, and national historic district that are located in Perry Township, Berks County, Pennsylvania, United States.

This complex was listed on the National Register of Historic Places in 1992.

== History and architectural features ==
This complex has six contributing buildings, two contributing sites, and three contributing structures. All of the buildings are constructed of Pennsylvania Bluestone. They include a 2 1/2-story, five-bay by two-bay, vernacular Federal-style farmhouse (1829), a 1 1/2-story, tenant house/blacksmith shop, a Pennsylvania bank barn, a wagon shed, a cider house, and a quarry house. The contributing structures are a bake oven, ground cellar, and large stone and earthen dam on Maiden Creek. The contributing sites are the Pennsylvania Bluestone quarry and cemetery. The quarry ceased operation in 1884, with the death of Jacob Leiby.

== Gallery ==
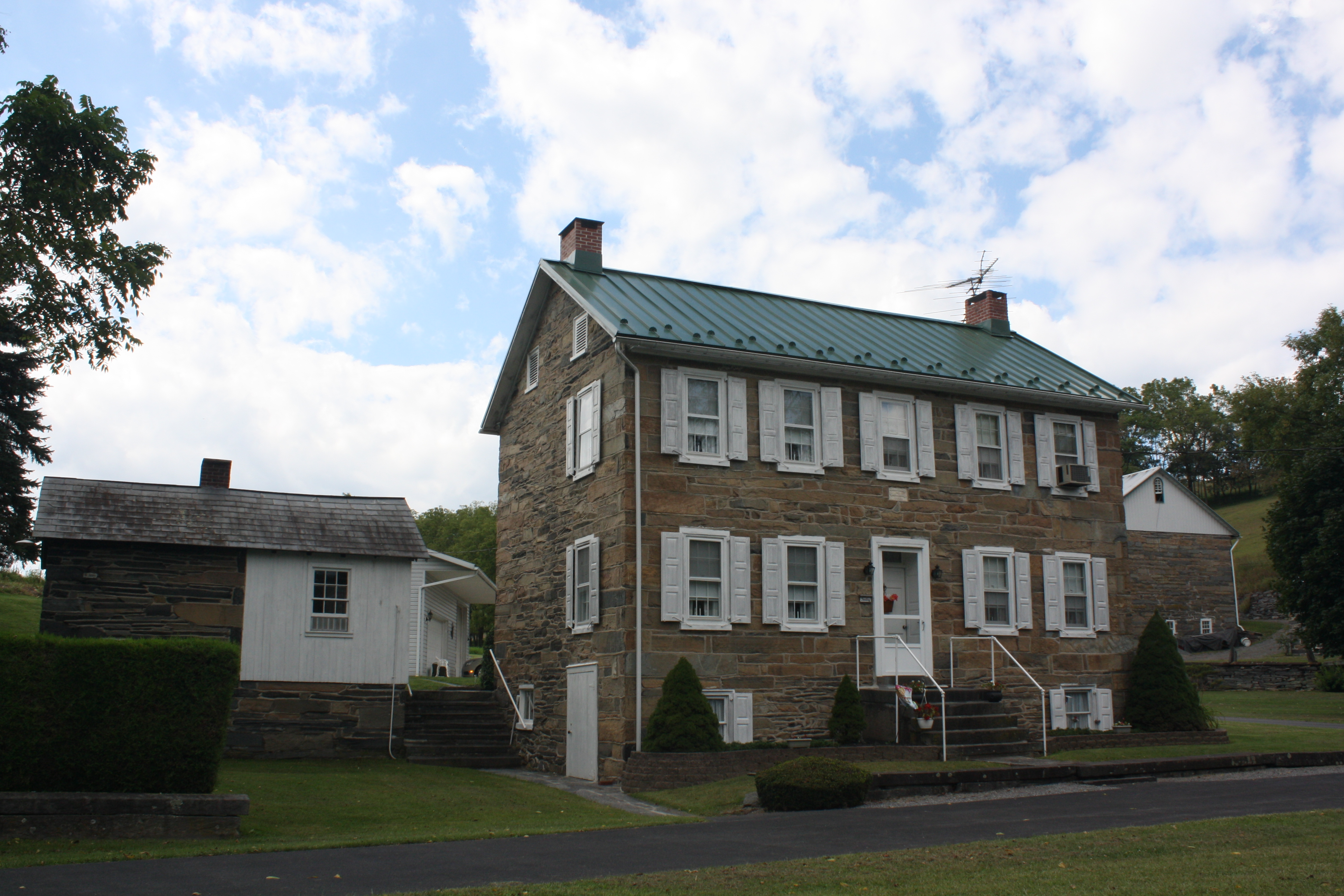
Farmhouse and cider house

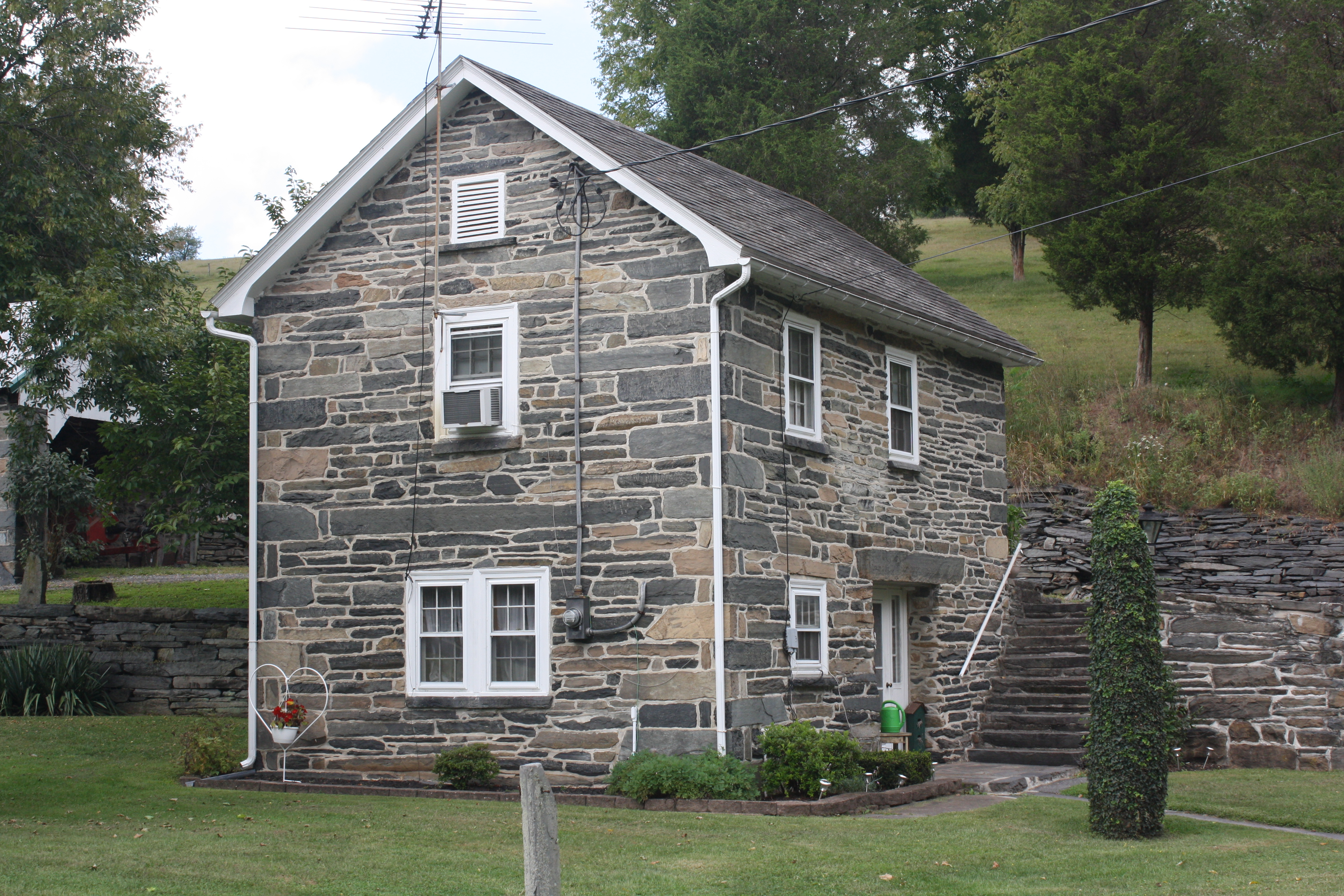
Tenant house

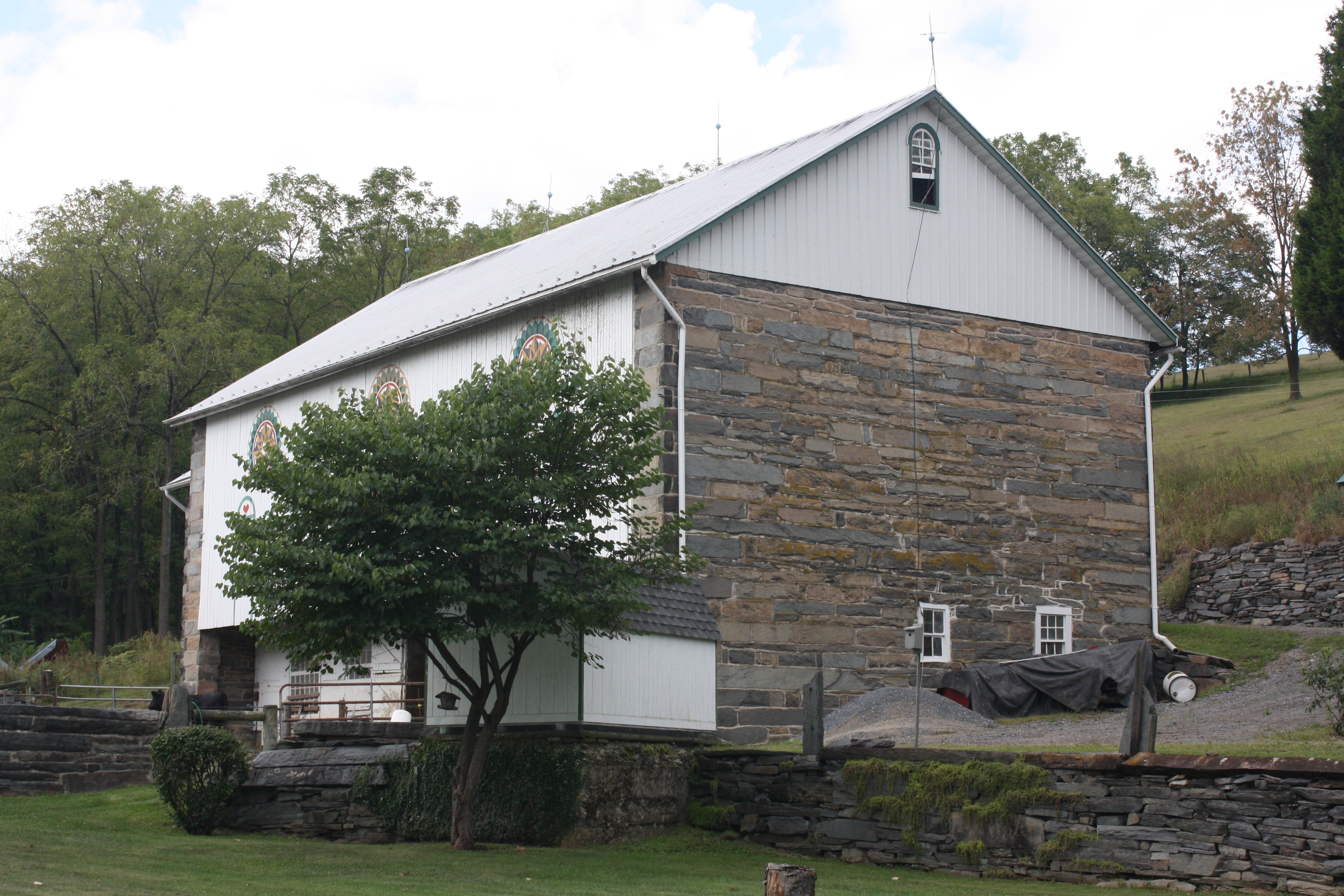
Barn
