= Fort McIntosh (Pennsylvania) =

- Fort McIntosh Site
- U.S. National Register of Historic Places
- U.S. Historic district – Contributing property
- Pennsylvania state historical marker
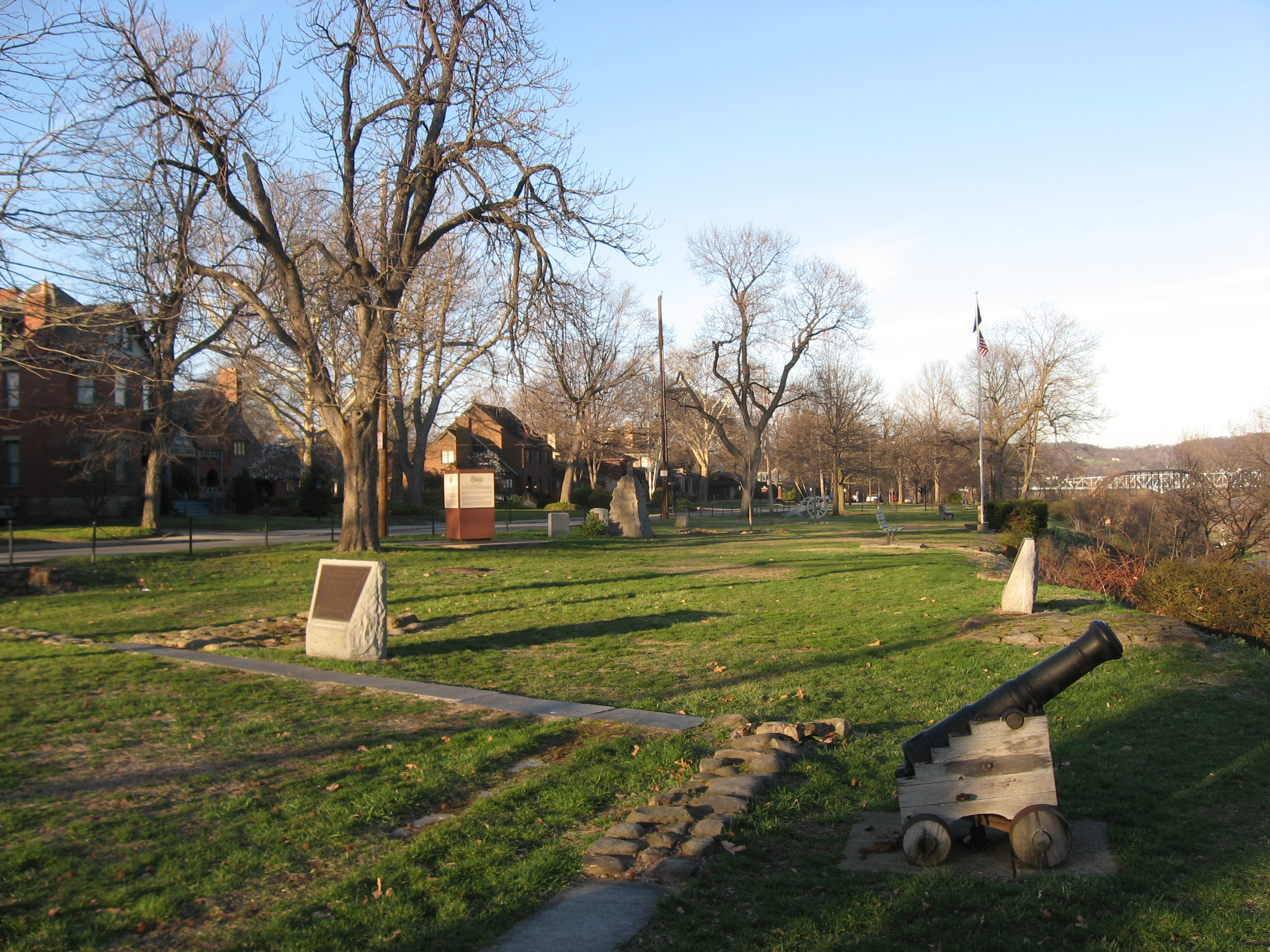
- Site of Fort McIntosh

- Location within Pennsylvania Location within the United States
- Location: Beaver, Pennsylvania
- Coordinates: 40°41′29″N 80°18′9.24″W
- Area: less than one acre
- Built: 1785
- Part of: Beaver Historic District (ID96001201)
- NRHP reference No.: 75001614

Significant dates
- Added to NRHP: April 24, 1975
- Designated PHMC: October 31, 1946

Fort McIntosh was an early American log frontier fort situated near the confluence of the Ohio River and the Beaver River in what is now Beaver, Pennsylvania. It was the first American fort north of the Ohio River at the time of its erection.

== Construction ==
The fortress was constructed in 1778 under the direction of Lt. Col. Cambray-Digny, a French engineer, and named in honor of General Lachlan McIntosh. A conference was held at Fort Pitt in 1778 where the United States agreed to build Fort McIntosh and use it to help protect Native Americans against the British or enemy-Indian attacks in exchange for Delaware Indian cooperation in the Revolutionary War. The fort was completed by the fall of 1778 and Lachlan McIntosh then moved about 1,500 men from Pittsburgh to Beaver.

Fort McIntosh was in the form of a trapezoid, about 150 feet on each side, with raised earthen bastions on each corner. Log palisades connected the bastions, and a 15 foot wide ditch protected three sides of the fort, with the 130 foot slope to the Ohio River protecting the other side. Inside were three barracks, warehouses, officer's quarters, a forge, kitchen, and powder magazines. The fort may have had either two or four iron cannon. Supplies from the Ohio River were accessed and moved through an underground passage.

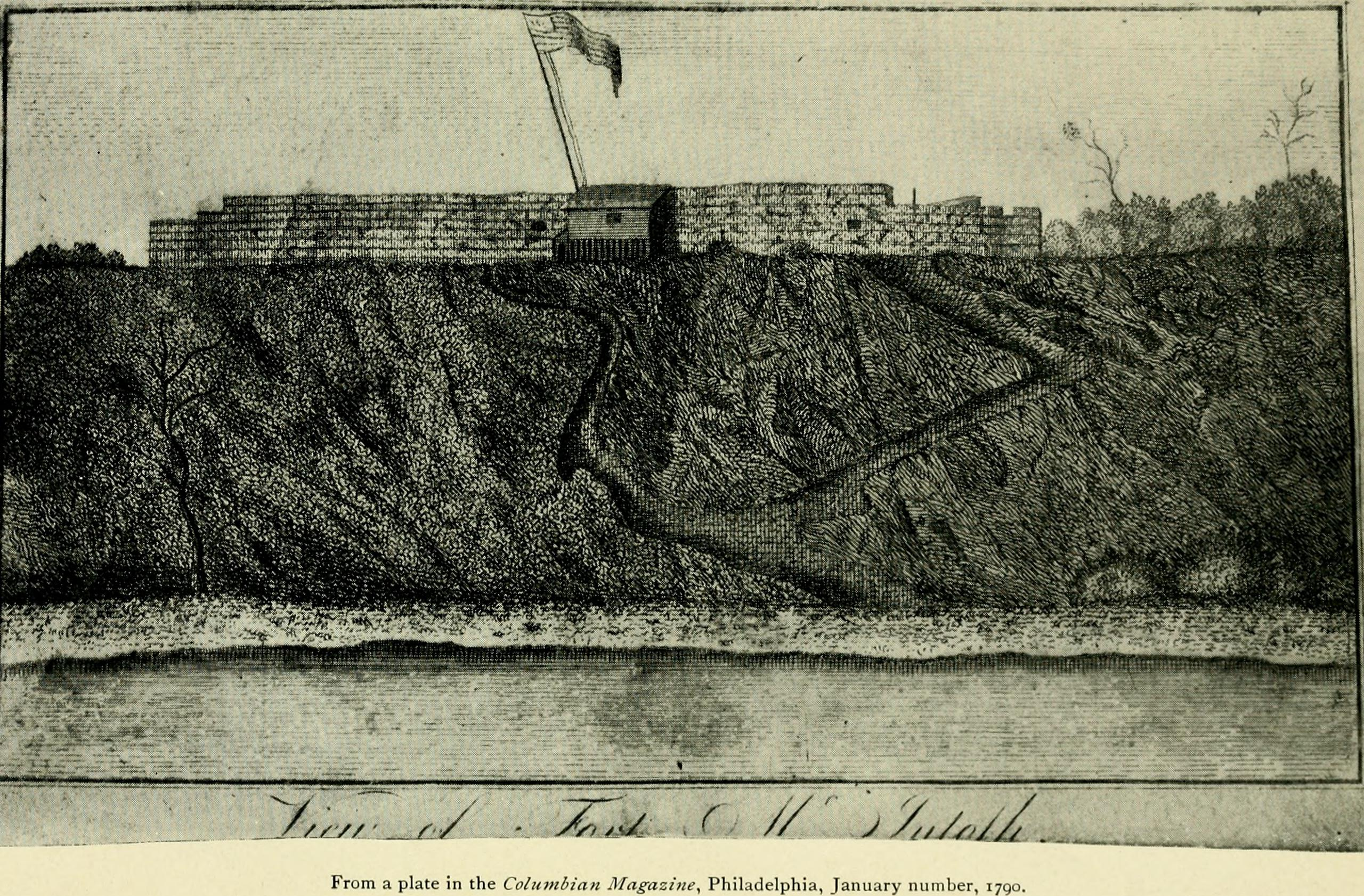
Fort McIntosh sits up from the northern bank of the Ohio River in this drawing published by Philadelphia's Columbian Magazine in 1790. This came just a few months before the fortification was abandoned in 1791.

The fortress was abandoned in 1791. Fort McIntosh was used as shelter for rangers, hunters, and spies after its shutdown. The roofs decayed in 1795 and only the western wing remained standing at that point. After the Revolution, the fort was the home of the First American Regiment, the oldest active unit in the United States Army. Between the decay, lack of supplies, vandalism, and lessened importance of the fort as the frontier shifted further westward, Fort McIntosh became largely obsolete.

== McIntosh Namesake ==
General Lachlan McIntosh pictured in his military uniform. McIntosh is known for establishing both Fort McIntosh and Fort Laurens during the Revolutionary War.

Lachlan McIntosh began his service during the Revolutionary War as Colonel of the Georgia Battalion in January 1776. In 1778, he served alongside General George Washington at Valley Forge, Pennsylvania, after which McIntosh was given command of the Continental Army's Western Department. With the creation of Fort McIntosh and Fort Laurens, McIntosh initiated a campaign for control of the Northwest Territory from Britain's Native American allies in the Ohio Valley.

== The Treaty of Fort McIntosh ==
The Treaty of Fort McIntosh was signed on January 21, 1785. Its goal was to create clear title to Delaware Indian lands in Pennsylvania so Revolutionary soldiers could then purchase said lands with certificates of depreciation. The Treaty was less a negotiation and rather an imposition on the Delaware, Wyandots, Chippewas, and Ottawas. The Native Americans gave up two thirds of Ohio in Article III of the Treaty, establishing the first boundary in the Northwest from which future territories were measured.

== Excavation and Restoration ==
In 1974, citizens of Beaver, Pennsylvania received assistance from the University of Pittsburgh and the Carnegie Museum to locate Fort McIntosh's remains and undertake excavations. They were successful in uncovering the stone footers which marked the walls and fireplaces of the fort. 80,000 identifiable artifacts were found in four years of digging. A dedication was held for the site on October 7, 1978, by U.S. Army General William Westmoreland, a full 200 years after Fort McIntosh was first constructed. In late 2010, a local business owner donated money for a granite and sandstone memorial on the fort site.

The fort site was listed on the National Register of Historic Places in 1975. In 1996, most of Beaver was listed on the National Register of Historic Places as the "Beaver Historic District." At that time, the fort site was singled out as one of the most significant of the district's 1,250 contributing properties.

The Beaver Area Heritage Foundation protects the restored site, which features granite monuments and bronze plaques, as well as the original stone footers of the walls and fireplaces.

== Site Legacy ==
The legacy of Fort McIntosh lives on in the present day through the work of the Fort McIntosh Club institution in Beaver, Pennsylvania. Since 1911, the club has strived to foster fellowship with the community via service outings, mentoring, and philanthropy. It unites passionate individuals who want to create positive change within Beaver County. The Fort McIntosh Foundation, established as a not-for-profit organization in 2015, makes financial contributions to military members and veterans, youth, families, and other organizations in the county.

The Beaver community also honors the importance of the fort to Western Pennsylvania with Fort McIntosh Day. Festivities include lessons on daily life in the 1700s and reenactments of canon fire and regimental drills by the Fort McIntosh and Wayne's 4th Sub-Legion of the United States.

== See also ==
- List of European archaeological sites on the National Register of Historic Places in Pennsylvania
