= Paint Township, Somerset County, Pennsylvania =

Township in Pennsylvania, US

Coordinates: 40.20152°N 78.85181°W

- Township
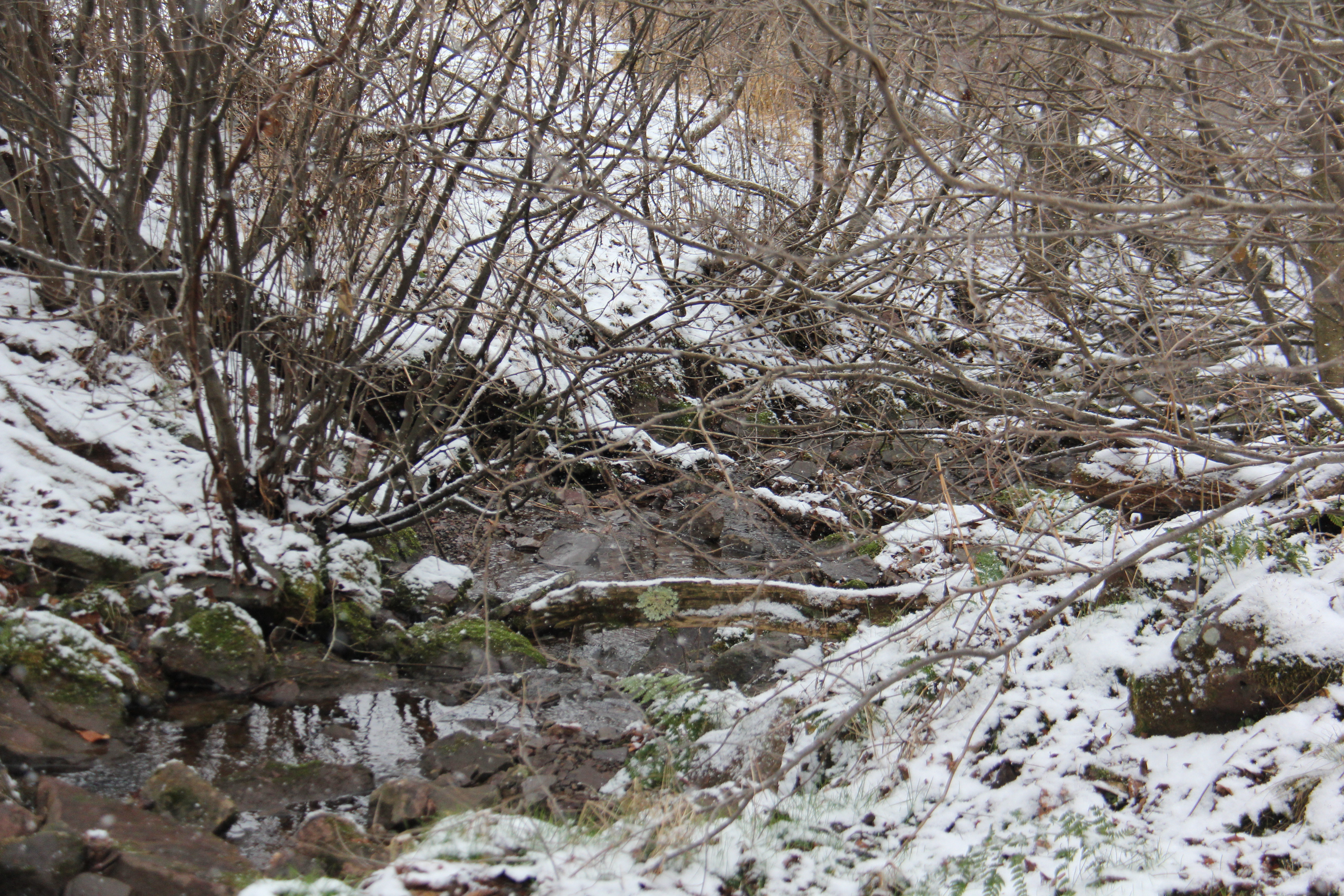
- Creek in Paint Township

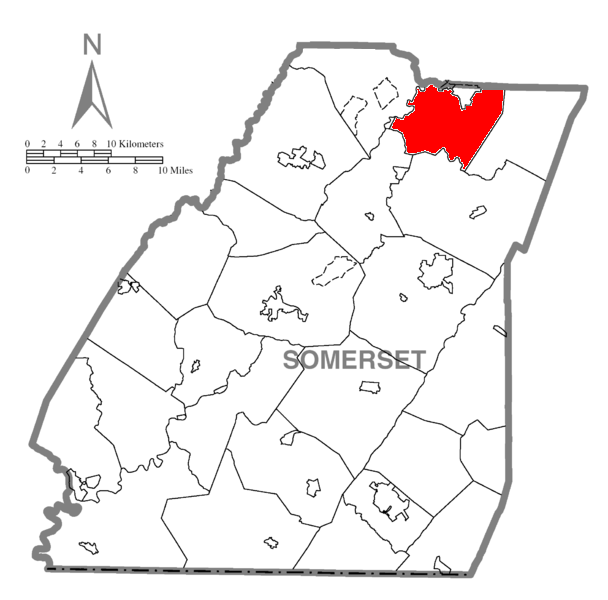
- Map of Somerset County, Pennsylvania Highlighting Paint Township

- Map of Somerset County, Pennsylvania
- Country: United States
- State: Pennsylvania
- County: Somerset

Area
  - Total: 32.38 sq mi (83.86 km^{2})
  - Land: 32.24 sq mi (83.51 km^{2})
  - Water: 0.14 sq mi (0.35 km^{2})

Population (2020)
  - Total: 3,038 ▼
  - Estimate (2021): 3,025
  - Density: 95.6/sq mi (36.92/km^{2})
- Time zone: UTC-5 (Eastern (EST))
  - Summer (DST): UTC-4 (EDT)
- FIPS code: 42-111-57552
- Website: https://www.painttownship.com/

Paint Township is a township in Somerset County, Pennsylvania, United States. The population was 3,038 at the 2020 census. It is part of the Johnstown, Pennsylvania, Metropolitan Statistical Area.

== History ==
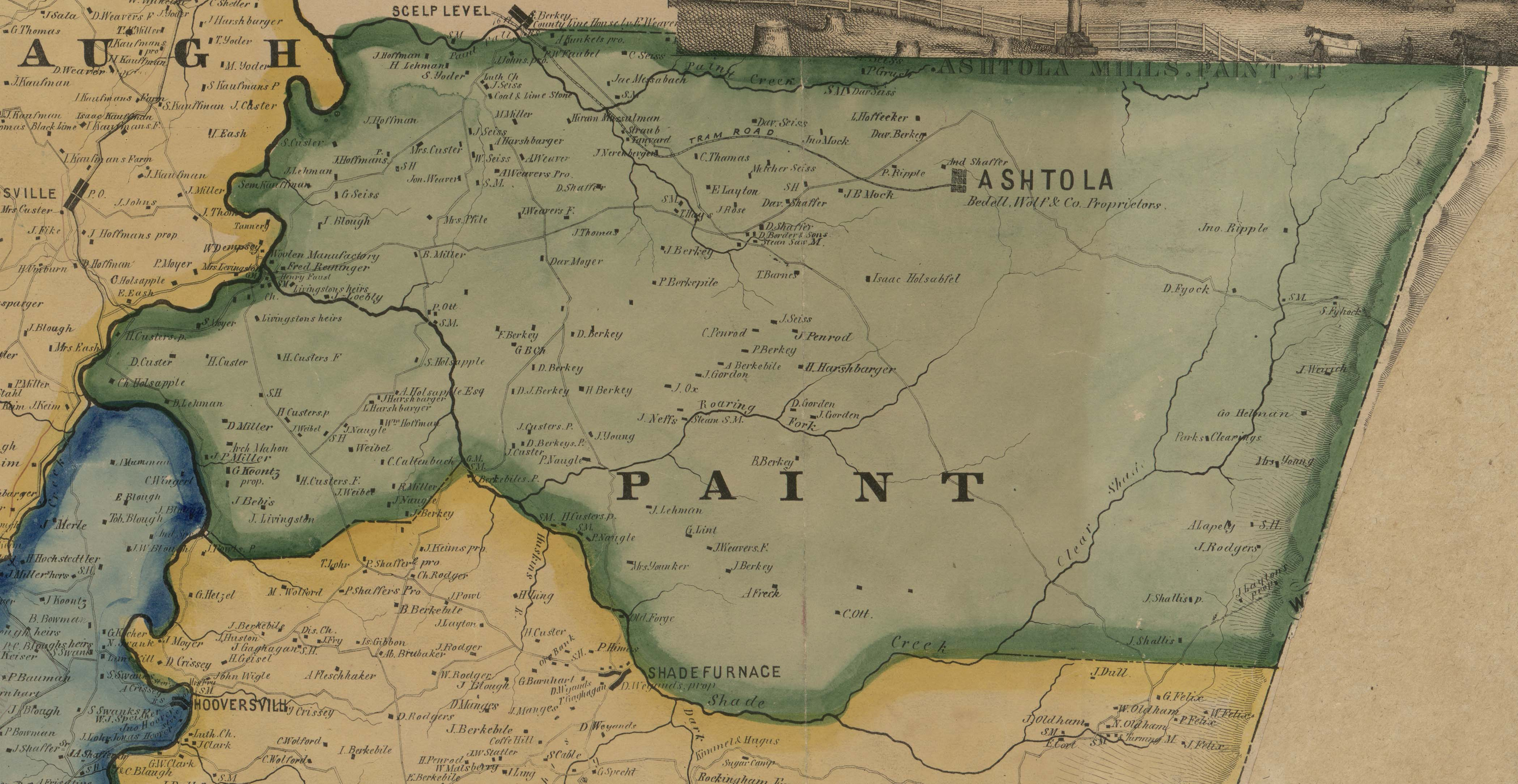
Paint Township, Somerset County, Pennsylvania, 1860

David Livingston built the first gristmill and the first sawmill in the area, both about 1812. Paint Township was established from the northern part of Shade Township in 1836. Jacob Berkebile opened the first store in 1848. The township was originally bordered by Cambria County to the north, Bedford County to the east, Shade Township to the south, and Conemaugh Township to the west. It was named after Paint Creek, which runs through the township. In 1886, Ogle Township was created from the eastern part of Paint Township, and by 1900, three Boroughs (Benson Borough, Paint Borough, and Windber Borough) were formed within the township. Benson incorporated in 1893, while both Paint and Windber incorporated in 1900. The boundaries of Paint Township have remained unchanged since then. Currently several small villages, including Ashtola, Hillsboro, Foustwell, Rummel, Seanor, Hagevo, Hollsopple, and Petoria make up the bulk of Paint Township's footprint. Much of Paint Township and its surrounding areas were, and are still very involved in the coal mining industry, with both strip mine and deep mine operations still in business.

== Geography ==
According to the United States Census Bureau, the township has a total area of 83.2 km^{2} (32.1 mi^{2}), of which 82.8 km^{2} (32.0 mi^{2}) is land and 0.4 km^{2} (0.1 mi^{2}) (0.44%) is water. Paint Township is bordered by Ogle Township to the east, Shade Township to the south, Quemahoning Township to the southwest, Conemaugh Township to the west, and Cambria County to the north. Pennsylvania Route 160 passes through Paint Township as it heads north from Shade Township to Cambria County.

== Demographics ==
Historical population
Census	Pop.	Note	%±
2010	3,149		—
2020	3,038		−3.5%
2021 (est.)	3,025		−0.4%
U.S. Decennial Census

At the 2000 census there were 3,300 people in 1,323 households, including 985 families, in the township. The population density was 39.9/km^{2} (103.2/mi^{2}). There were 1,386 housing units at an average density of 16.7/km^{2} (43.3/mi^{2}). The racial makeup of the township was 99.73% White, 0.09% Asian, 0.09% from other races, and 0.09% from two or more races. Hispanic or Latino of any race were 0.52%.

Of the 1,323 households 27.5% had children under the age of 18 living with them, 64.2% were married couples living together, 7.3% had a female householder with no husband present, and 25.5% were non-families. 23.1% of households were one person and 12.5% were one person aged 65 or older. The average household size was 2.49 and the average family size was 2.94.

The age distribution was 21.2% under the age of 18, 6.8% from 18 to 24, 25.2% from 25 to 44, 28.9% from 45 to 64, and 18.0% 65 or older. The median age was 43 years. For every 100 females, there were 97.3 males. For every 100 females age 18 and over, there were 94.1 males.

The median household income was $32,649 and the median family income was $39,071. Males had a median income of $30,975 versus $18,571 for females. The per capita income for the township was $14,694. About 3.4% of families and 4.6% of the population were below the poverty line, including 5.3% of those under age 18 and 1.0% of those age 65 or over.
