= Shade Furnace Archaeological District =

Historic district in Pennsylvania, United States

- Shade Furnace Archeological District
- U.S. National Register of Historic Places
- U.S. Historic district
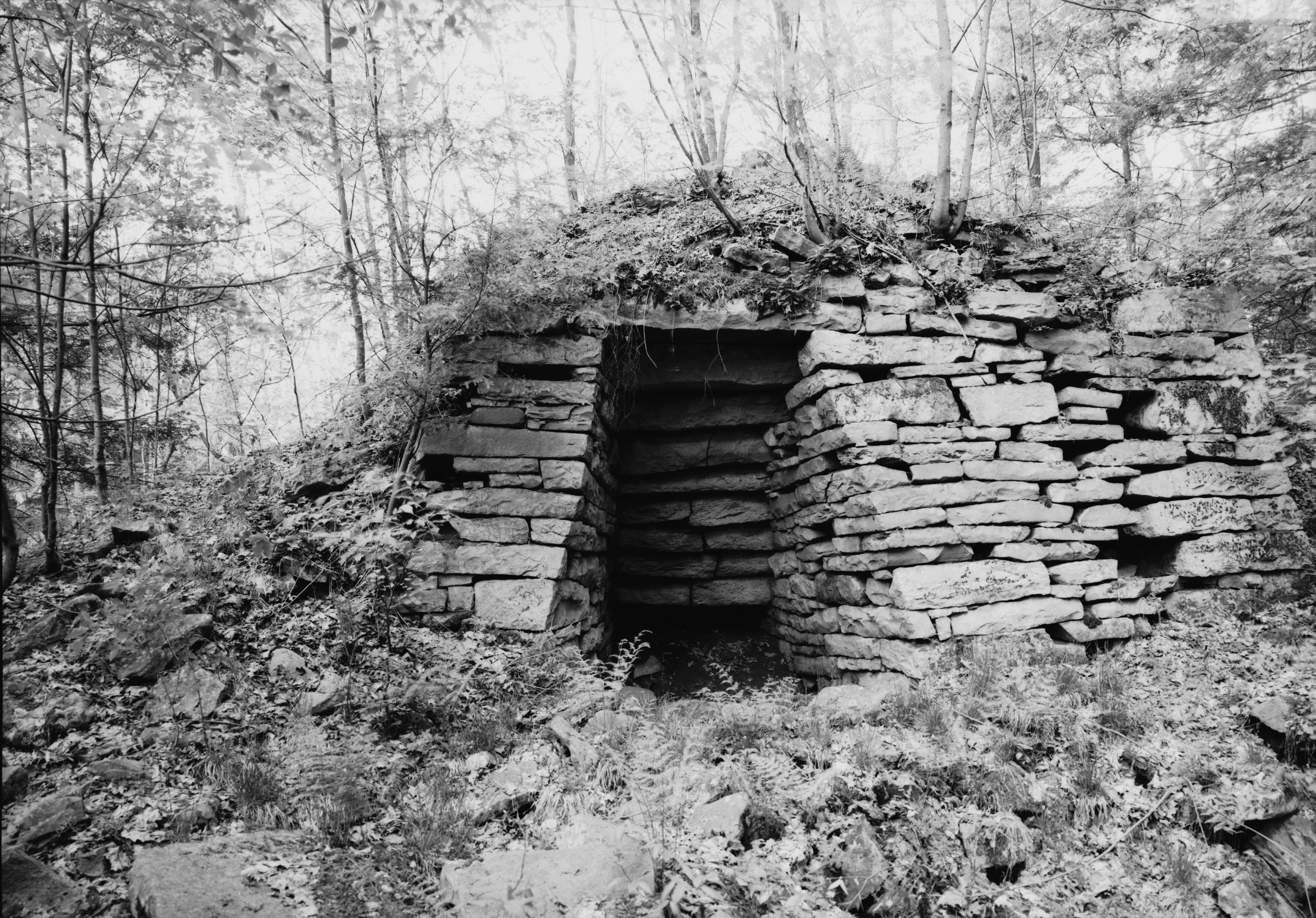
- Shade Furnace, 1992

- Location within Pennsylvania Location within the United States
- Location: North of Rockingham above Dark Shade Creek, Shade Township, Pennsylvania
- Coordinates: 40°9′11.22″N 78°49′41.88″W
- Area: 208 acres (84 ha)
- Built by: George Reynolds, Peter Gerhart
- Architectural style: 19th-century stone blast furnace
- MPS: Iron and Steel Resources of Pennsylvania MPS
- NRHP reference No.: 07001380
- Added to NRHP: January 10, 2008

Shade Furnace Archeological District, also known as Old Shade Furnace and Shade Forge, is a national historic district located at Shade Township in Somerset County, Pennsylvania. The district includes four contributing sites and two contributing objects. It encompasses the ruins of a countryside plantation style iron forge operation that operated from 1808 to 1858. It includes a stone blast furnace structure, a forge site, an ore pit site, a farmstead site, and a late 19th-century coal mine complex. The area includes a number of archaeological sites associated with the ruins of abandoned buildings.

It was listed on the National Register of Historic Places in 2008.
