= Louis Antoine Cambray-Digny =

Louis Antoine Jean Baptiste de Cambray-Digny (1751–1822) was a French officer during the American Revolution.

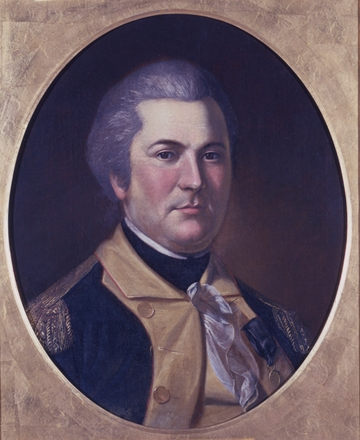
Louis Antoine Jean Baptiste de Cambray-Digny

He was born in Florence, Grand Duchy of Tuscany to French parents. Not much is known of his early life until he joined the French artillery as an officer candidate in 1770 and was discharged in 1774.

In early 1778, he sailed to the revolting American Colonies with letters of recommendation including a letter from Benjamin Franklin to George Washington. He was given a commission as a lieutenant colonel in the Continental Army by Continental Congress in York, Pennsylvania on June 13. He fought at the Battle of Monmouth soon after. He was sent to Charleston, South Carolina and later Pittsburgh, Pennsylvania, where he directed construction of Fort McIntosh as a chief engineer.

On February 2, 1779, he was sent to Baltimore, Maryland and then Edenton, North Carolina, where he would lead troops in the Southern Campaign. He gave regular reports to General Benjamin Lincoln. Lt. Col. de Cambray was eventually sent to take part in the Savannah Campaign.

In late 1779 de Cambray and Colonel Jean Baptiste Joseph, the Chevalier de Laumoy were sent to help with the defense of Charleston by improving fortifications.

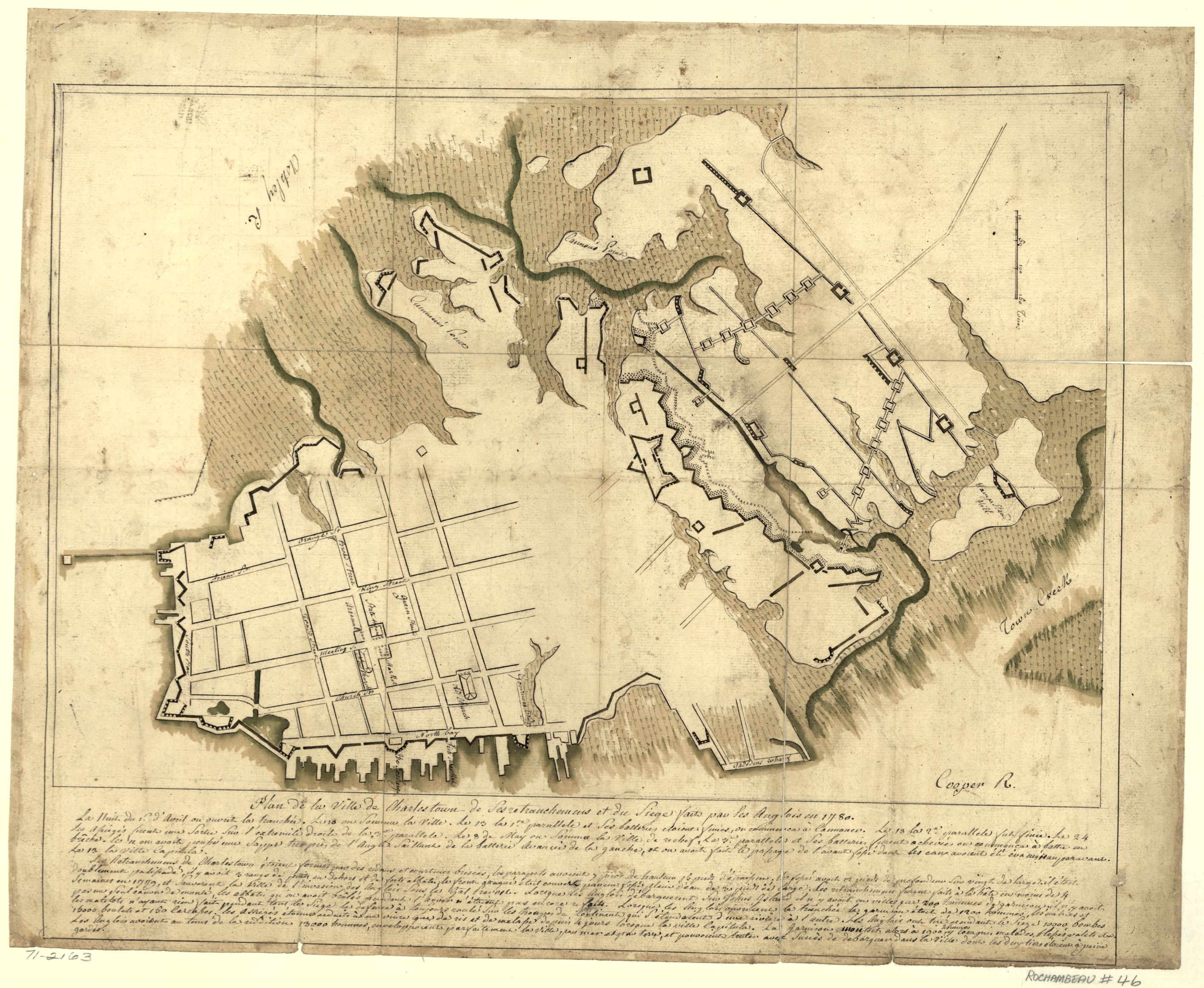
Map of Charleston by Colonel de Cambray. Library of Congress.

He was taken prisoner on May 12, 1780, with the rest of Lincoln's army and exchanged in Fall, 1782.

Lt. Col. de Cambray was given the distinction of being awarded a medal by the Assembly of South Carolina for his leadership in creating fortifications during the 1780 British Siege of Charleston. Cambray-Digny stands among an elite group of Revolutionary War medal recipients, including George Washington, John Paul Jones, Nathanael Greene, Anthony Wayne, and Daniel Morgan. His medal is one of only 15 medals awarded by the Americans during the Revolutionary War - and one of only two given to French Officers.

In October 1782, after being released as a POW, Chevalier de Cambray sat for a portrait by Charles Willson Peale. In the painting, Cambray is wearing his Officer's military uniform, and the medal awarded to him by the South Carolina Assembly. The portrait is now in the collection at Independence Hall. Worn out after seven years as a soldier, two of them spent in a POW camp, De Cambray requested and was granted a one-year leave, and returned to France. He retired with the rank of Brevet Colonel, and was honorably discharged on November 15, 1782.

He took a small part in the French elections of 1789 and the French Revolution. He died at the age of 71 in 1822 in his chateau in the Somme.
