= Cairnbrook Historic District =

Historic district in Pennsylvania, United States

- U.S. National Register of Historic Places
- U.S. Historic district
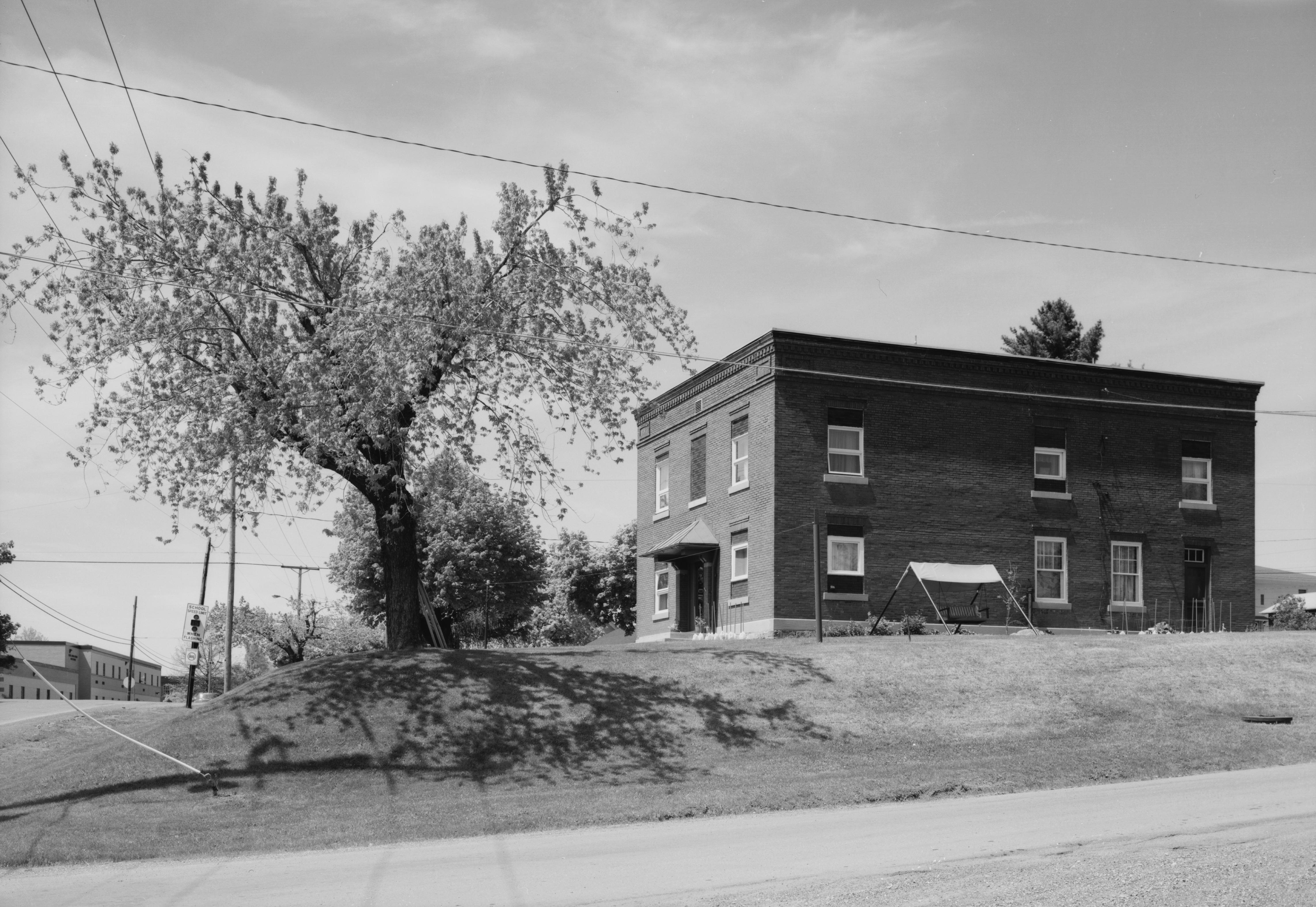
- Loyalhanna Coal and Coke Company Office, 1992

- Location within Pennsylvania Location within the United States
- Location: Roughly bounded by the Penn Central RR tracks, McGregor Ave., Windber Ave. and John St., Cairnbrook, Shade Township, Pennsylvania
- Coordinates: 40°07′20″N 78°48′59″W
- Area: 50 acres (20 ha)
- Built: 1912
- Built by: S.E. Dickey and Co.
- Architect: S.E. Dickey and Co.
- Architectural style: Prairie School, Company Housing
- MPS: Bituminous Coal and Coke Resources of Pennsylvania MPS
- NRHP reference No.: 94000523
- Added to NRHP: June 3, 1994

Cairnbrook Historic District is a national historic district located at Shade Township in Somerset County, Pennsylvania. The district includes 132 contributing buildings and 8 contributing structures. It encompasses an area developed by the Loyalhanna Coal and Coke Company of Philadelphia, Pennsylvania between 1912 and 1920. It includes the remaining extant mine resources and the archaeological remains of the mine. They consist of workers' housing, a variety of commercial and social buildings, and a modern draft entry mine with accompanying extractive buildings and structures. Notable buildings include the motor barn, supply house, electric substation, and Loyalhanna Coal and Coke Company Office (1914). The mine operated until 1958.

It was listed on the National Register of Historic Places in 1994.
