= Perry Township, Berks County, Pennsylvania =

Township in Pennsylvania, US

Perry Township
- Township
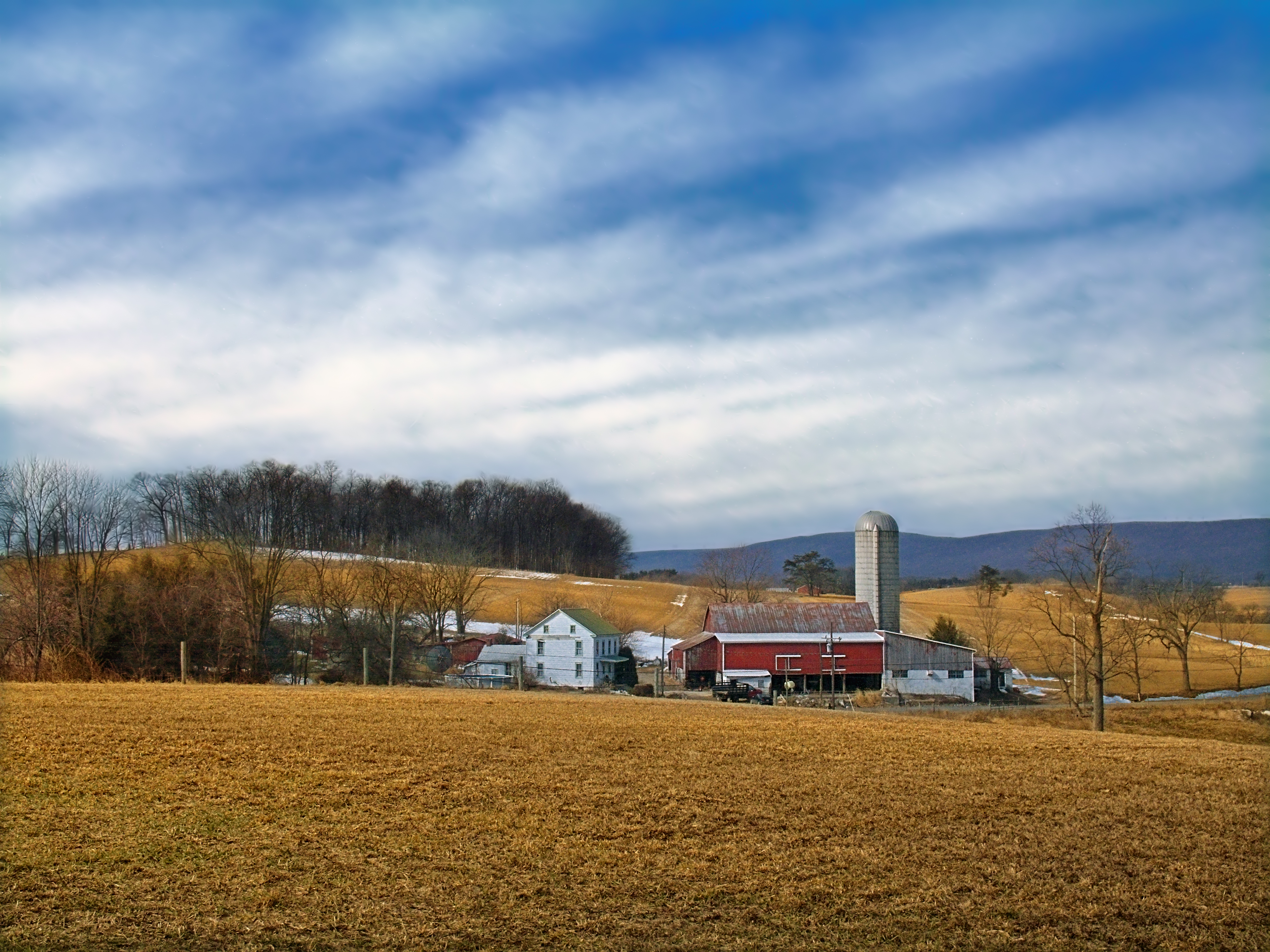
- Hartspring Farms, a farm in Perry Township

- Location of Perry Township in Pennsylvania Perry Township (the United States)
- Coordinates: 40°30′40″N 75°56′05″W
- Country: United States
- State: Pennsylvania
- County: Berks

Area
  - Total: 18.17 sq mi (47.06 km^{2})
  - Land: 18.01 sq mi (46.65 km^{2})
  - Water: 0.16 sq mi (0.41 km^{2})
- Elevation: 417 ft (127 m)

Population (2010)
  - Total: 2,417
  - Estimate (2016): 2,429
  - Density: 134.9/sq mi (52.07/km^{2})
- Time zone: UTC-5 (EST)
  - Summer (DST): UTC-4 (EDT)
- Area code: 610
- FIPS code: 42-011-59448
- Website: https://www.perrytownshipberkscounty.com/

Perry Township is a township in Berks County, Pennsylvania, United States. The population was 2,417 at the 2010 census.

== History ==
The Dreibelbis Mill and Jacob Leiby Farm are listed on the National Register of Historic Places.

== Geography ==
According to the United States Census Bureau, the township has a total area of 18.4 square miles (47.7 km^{2}), of which 18.3 square miles (47.3 km^{2}) is land and 0.1 square mile (0.4 km^{2}) (0.76%) is water.

Adjacent townships

- Windsor Township (north)
- Greenwich Township (northeast)
- Richmond Township (east)
- Maidencreek Township (south)
- Ontelaunee Township (southwest)
- Centre Township (west)
- Tilden Township (northwest)

The borough of Shoemakersville (west)

== Demographics ==
Historical population
| Census | Pop. | Note | %± |
|---|---|---|---|
| 1980 | 2,420 | | — |
| 1990 | 2,516 | | 4.0% |
| 2000 | 2,517 | | 0.0% |
| 2010 | 2,417 | | −4.0% |
| 2016 (est.) | 2,429 | | 0.5% |
Source: US Census Bureau

At the 2000 census there were 2,517 people, 973 households, and 746 families living in the township. The population density was 137.7 inhabitants per square mile (53.2/km^{2}). There were 1,017 housing units at an average density of 55.6 per square mile (21.5/km^{2}). The racial makeup of the township was 98.29% White, 0.36% African American, 0.04% Native American, 0.20% Asian, 0.75% from other races, and 0.36% from two or more races. Hispanic or Latino of any race were 1.19%.

There were 973 households, 29.5% had children under the age of 18 living with them, 67.0% were married couples living together, 6.1% had a female householder with no husband present, and 23.3% were non-families. 17.8% of households were made up of individuals, and 7.8% were one person aged 65 or older. The average household size was 2.59 and the average family size was 2.93.

The age distribution was 21.7% under the age of 18, 6.6% from 18 to 24, 29.0% from 25 to 44, 29.5% from 45 to 64, and 13.3% 65 or older. The median age was 41 years. For every 100 females, there were 103.6 males. For every 100 females age 18 and over, there were 97.0 males.

The median household income was $47,538 and the median family income was $52,794. Males had a median income of $36,886 versus $23,170 for females. The per capita income for the township was $20,343. About 5.5% of families and 8.2% of the population were below the poverty line, including 8.4% of those under age 18 and 10.8% of those age 65 or over.

== Transportation ==
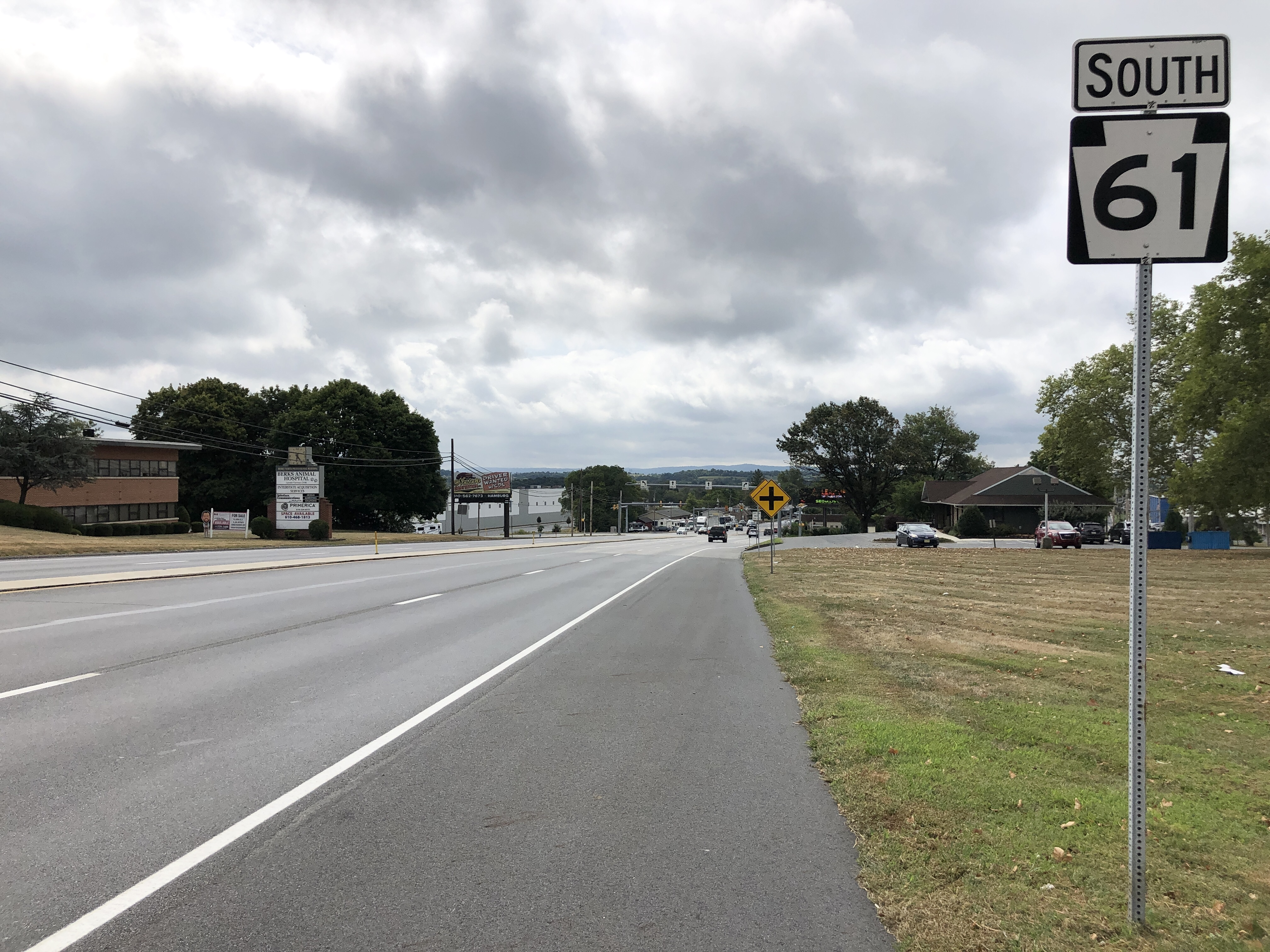
PA 61 southbound in Perry Township

As of 2020, there were 64.45 miles (103.72 km) of public roads in Perry Township, of which 12.25 miles (19.71 km) were maintained by the Pennsylvania Department of Transportation (PennDOT) and 52.20 miles (84.01 km) were maintained by the township.

Pennsylvania Route 61 is the most prominent highway serving Perry Township. It follows Pottsville Pike along a north–south alignment across the western portion of the township. Pennsylvania Route 143 follows Ontelaunee Trail along a north–south alignment in the northeastern corner of the township. Finally, Pennsylvania Route 662 follows Moselem Spring Road eastward from PA 61 across the southern and central portions of the township.
