= Lewis Township, Northumberland County, Pennsylvania =

Township in Pennsylvania, US

Coordinates: 41°08′00″N 76°43′59″W

- Township
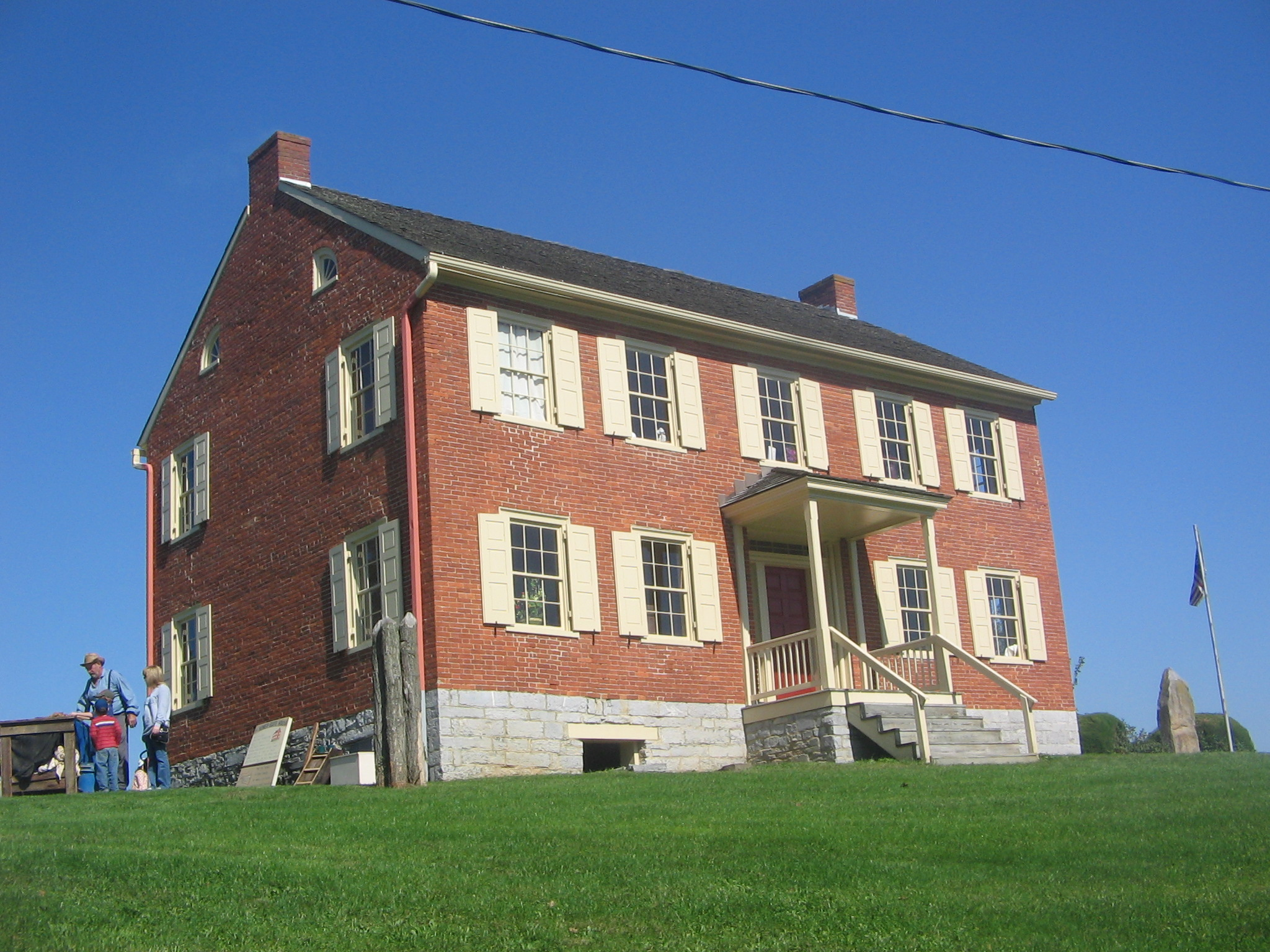
- The Hower-Slote House is on the National Register of Historic Places and was built on the site of Fort Freeland (destroyed 1779)

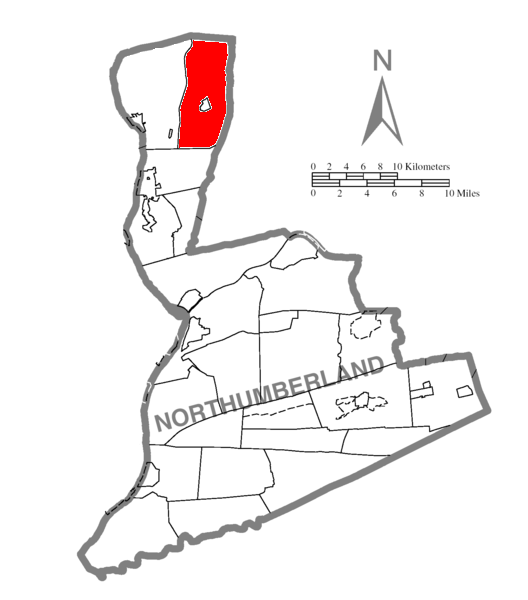
- Map of Northumberland County, Pennsylvania highlighting Lewis Township

- Map of Northumberland County, Pennsylvania
- Country: United States
- State: Pennsylvania
- County: Northumberland
- Settled: 1773
- Incorporated: 1843

Government
  - Type: Board of Supervisors

Area
  - Total: 26.41 sq mi (68.39 km^{2})
  - Land: 26.38 sq mi (68.33 km^{2})
  - Water: 0.023 sq mi (0.06 km^{2})

Population (2010)
  - Total: 1,915
  - Estimate (2016): 1,911
  - Density: 72.4/sq mi (27.97/km^{2})
- Time zone: UTC-5 (Eastern (EST))
  - Summer (DST): UTC-4 (EDT)
- Area code: 570
- FIPS code: 42-097-42952
- Website: https://lewistownship.com/

Lewis Township is a township that is located in Northumberland County, Pennsylvania, United States. The population at the time of the 2010 Census was 1,915, an increase over the figure of 1,862 that was tabulated in 2000.

== History ==
The Hower-Slote House was listed on the National Register of Historic Places in 1979.

== Geography ==
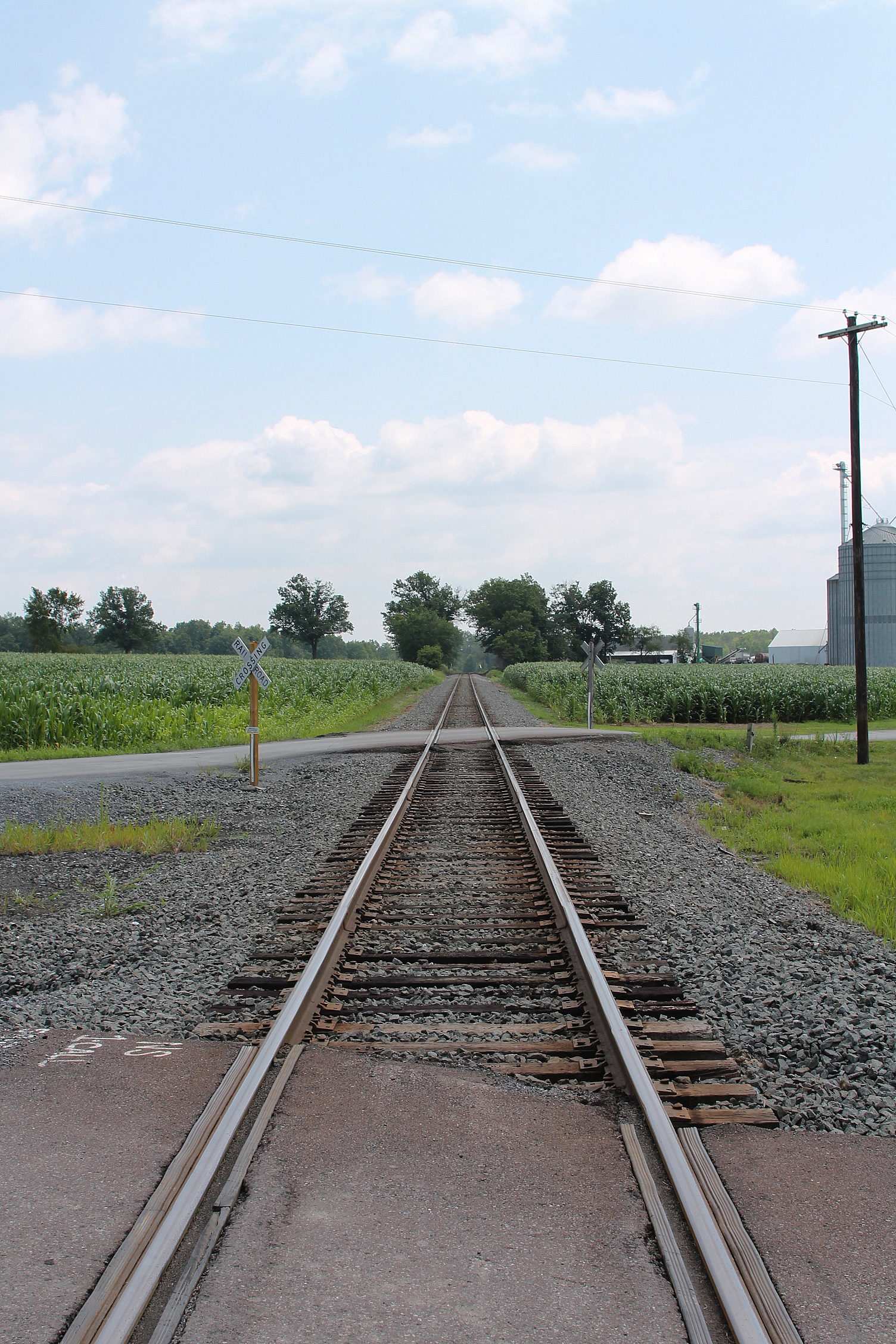
Railroad in Lewis Township, southeast of Turbotville.

According to the United States Census Bureau, the township has a total area of 26.4 square miles (68.3 km^{2}), all land.

== Demographics ==
Historical population
Census	Pop.	Note	%±
2010	1,915		—
2016 (est.)	1,911		−0.2%
U.S. Decennial Census

As of the census of 2000, there were 1,862 people, 636 households, and 550 families residing in the township.

The population density was 70.6 inhabitants per square mile (27.3/km^{2}). There were 663 housing units at an average density of 25.1/sq mi (9.7/km^{2}).

The racial makeup of the township was 99.36% White, 0.16% African American, 0.05% Native American, 0.16% Asian, 0.05% from other races, and 0.21% from two or more races. Hispanic or Latino of any race were 0.21% of the population.

There were 636 households, out of which 36.5% had children under the age of eighteen living with them; 79.1% were married couples living together, 3.6% had a female householder with no husband present, and 13.4% were non-families. 11.6% of all households were made up of individuals, and 6.0% had someone living alone who was sixty-five years of age or older.

The average household size was 2.89, and the average family size was 3.11.

Within the township, the population was spread out, with 25.7% of residents who were under the age of eighteen, 7.9% who were aged eighteen to twenty-four, 26.0% who were aged twenty-five to forty-four, 28.3% who were aged forty-five to sixty-four, and 12.0% who were sixty-five years of age or older. The median age was thirty-nine years.

For every one hundred females, there were 103.9 males. For every one hundred females who were aged eighteen or older, there were 101.0 males.

The median income for a household in the township was $41,406, and the median income for a family was $44,922. Males had a median income of $32,101 compared with that of $21,767 for females.

The per capita income for the township was $16,876.

Approximately 3.9% of families and 7.6% of the population were living below the poverty line, including 14.4% of those who were under the age of eighteen and 5.6% of those who were aged sixty-five or older.
