= Dreibelbis Mill =

- U.S. National Register of Historic Places
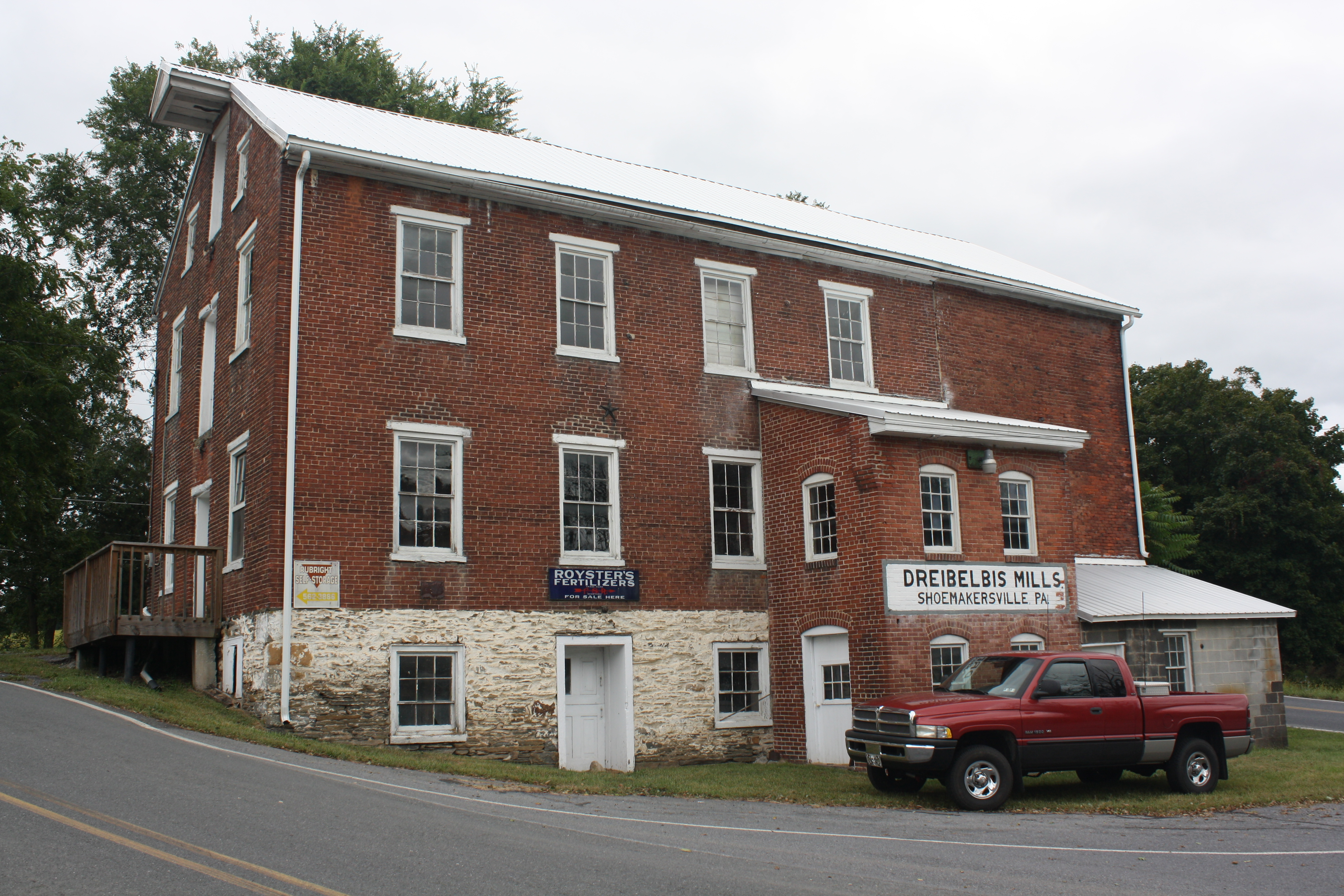
- Dreibelbis Mill. September 2013.

- Location within Pennsylvania Location within the United States
- Location: Junction of Dreibelbis Mill and Bellevue Roads, Perry Township, Pennsylvania
- Coordinates: 40°30′22″N 75°57′23″W
- Area: 11 acres (4.5 ha)
- Built: 1854
- Architectural style: Gristmill
- MPS: Gristmills in Berks County MPS
- NRHP reference No.: 90001614
- Added to NRHP: November 8, 1990

Dreibelbis Mill /draɪbəlbɪs/ is a historic grist mill located in Perry Township, Berks County, Pennsylvania. The mill was built in 1854, and is a 2 1/2-story, brick building on a banked stone basement. The mill remained in operation until 1985. After 1944, it was powered by a diesel engine.

It was listed on the National Register of Historic Places in 1990.

== Gallery ==
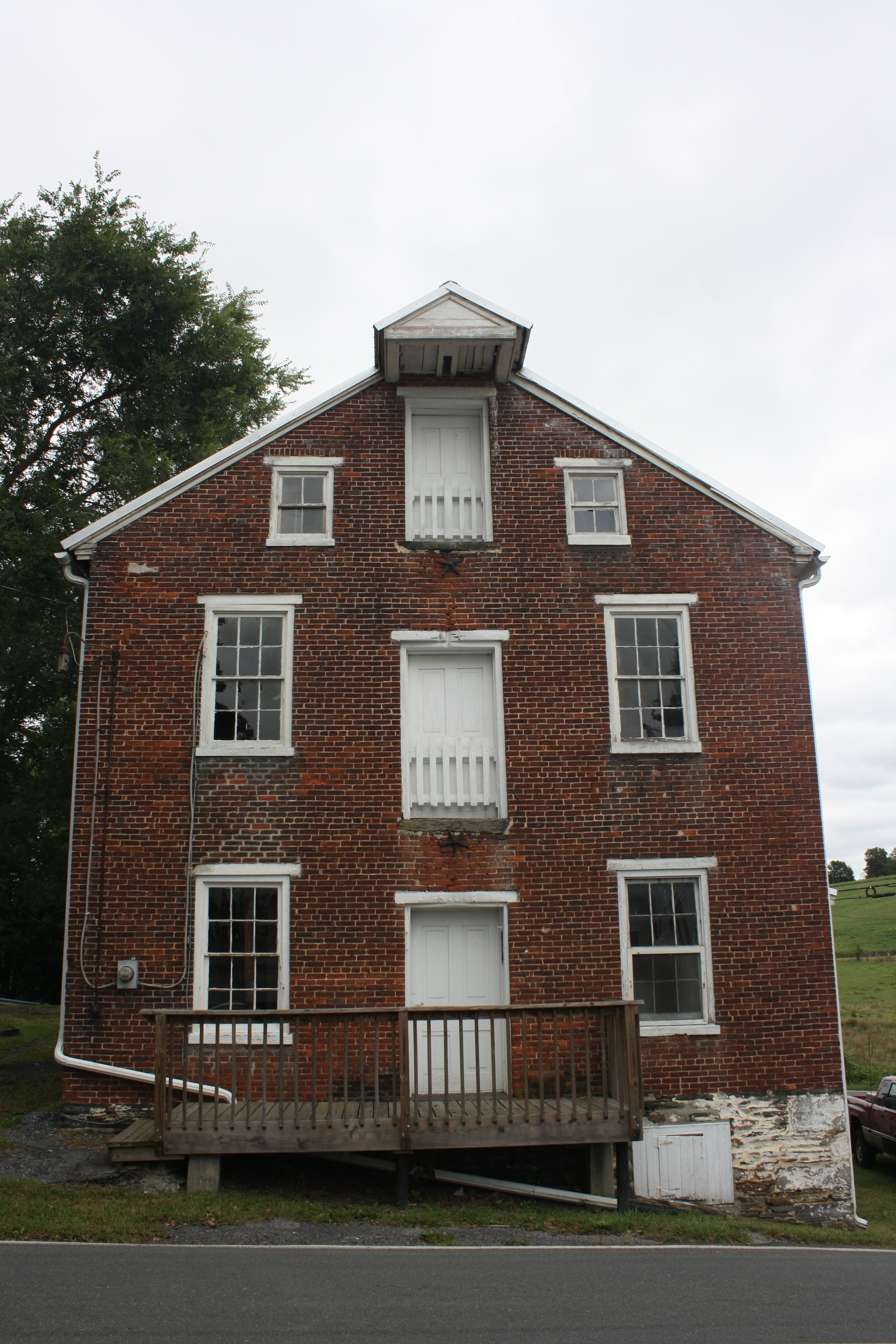
West side

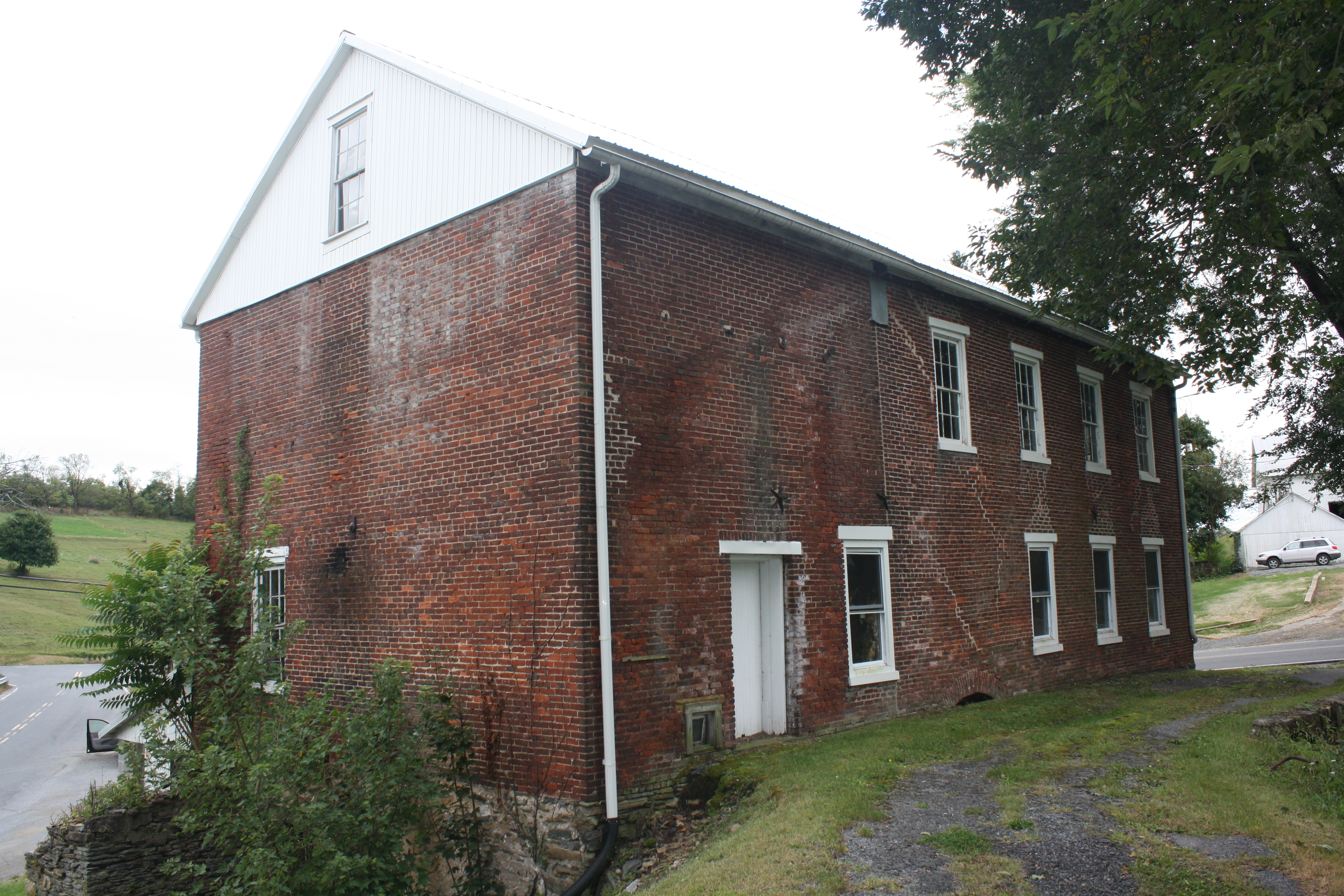
East side

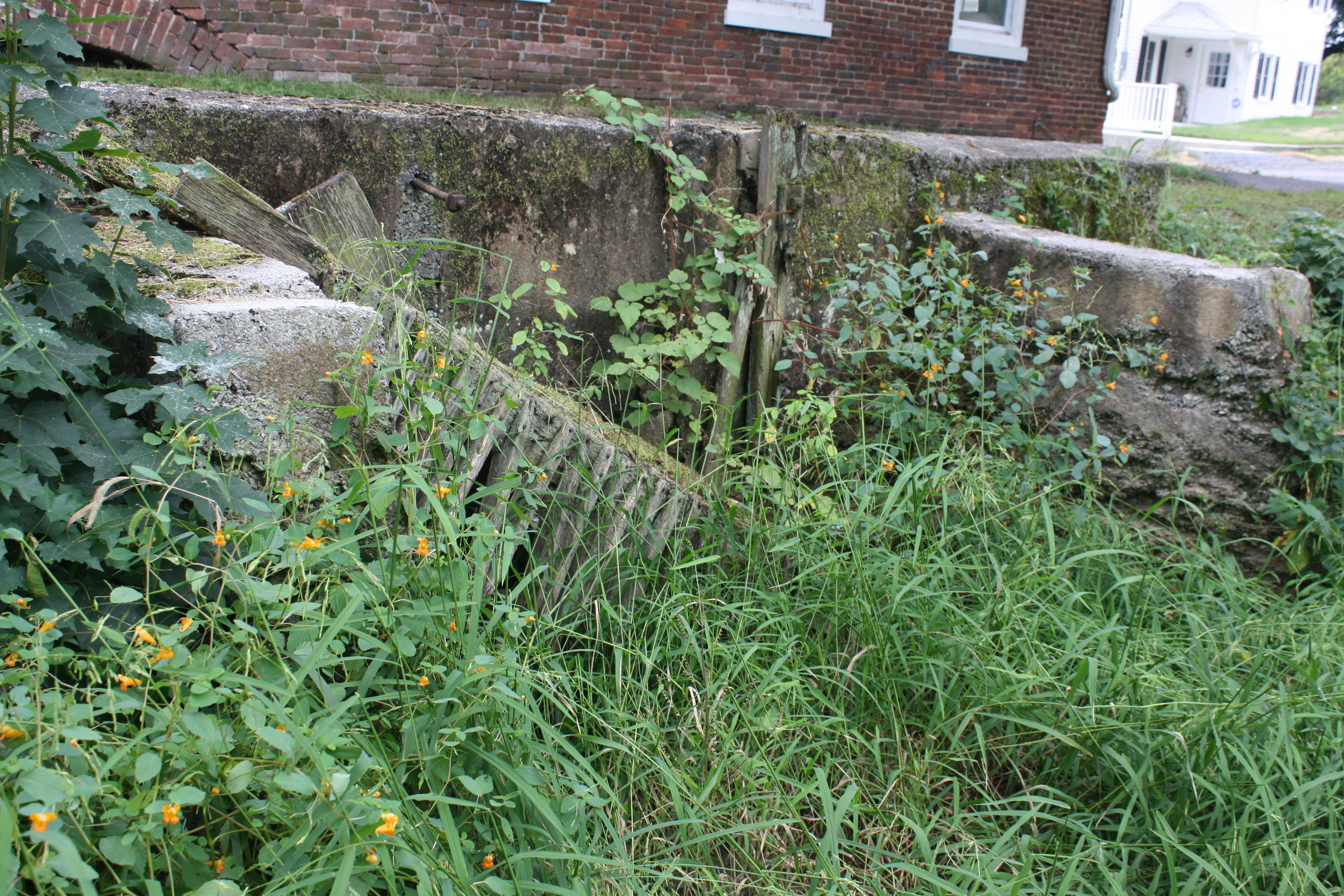
Millrace
