= Hower-Slote House =

Historic house in Pennsylvania, United States

- U.S. National Register of Historic Places
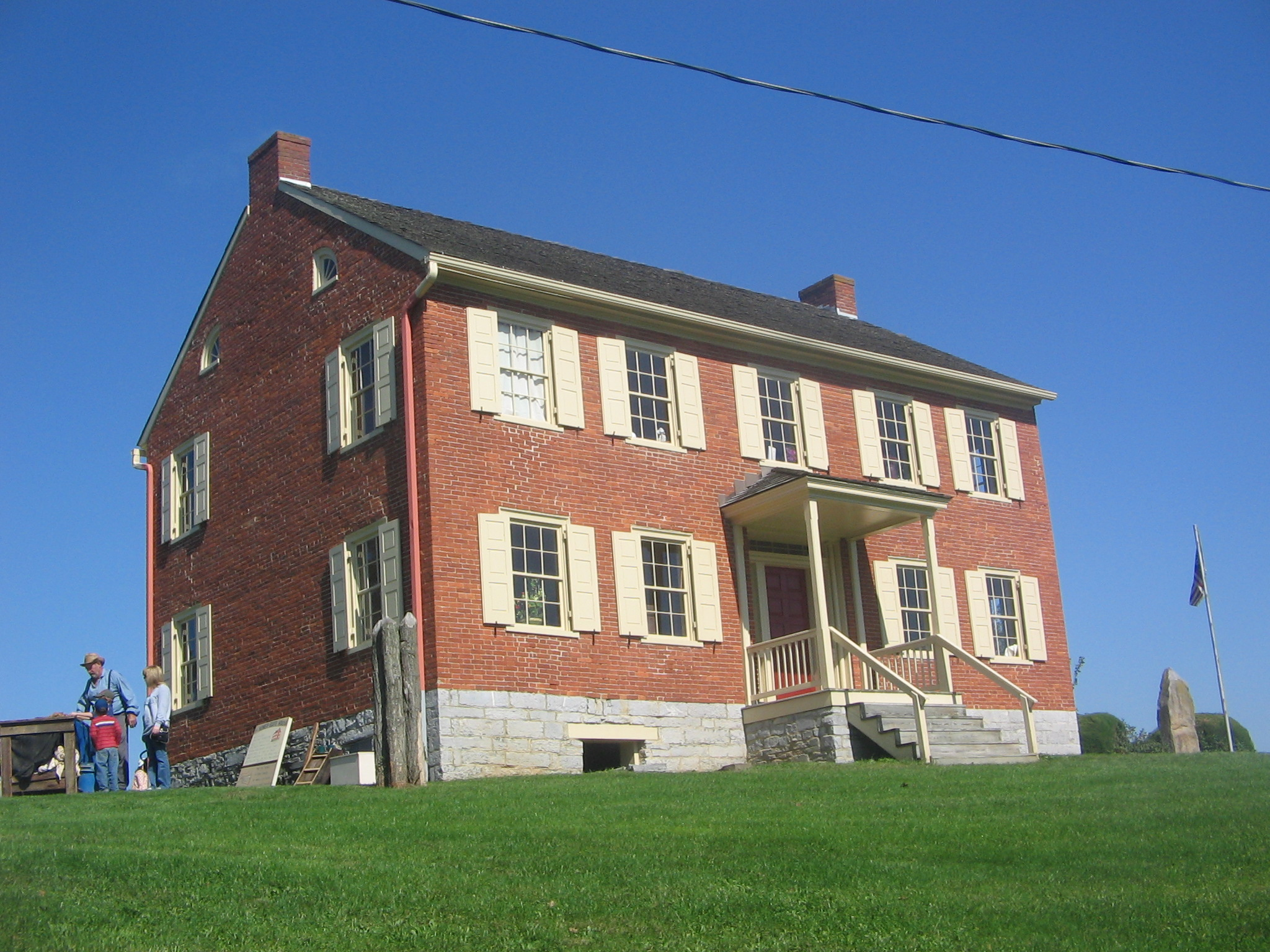
- Hower-Slote House, October 2009

- Location within Pennsylvania Location within the United States
- Location: West of Turbotville, Lewis, Pennsylvania
- Coordinates: 41°06′06″N 76°47′45″W
- Area: 15 acres (6.1 ha)
- Built: c. 1845
- NRHP reference No.: 79002314
- Added to NRHP: August 22, 1979

The Hower-Slote House, also known as the Fort Freeland House, is an historic home which is located in Lewis Township, Northumberland County, Pennsylvania.

It was added to the National Register of Historic Places in 1979.

== History and architectural features ==
Built circa 1845, this historic structure is a 2 1/2-story, five-bay-by-two-bay, rectangular, brick dwelling, which was designed in the Germanic style. It measures forty feet by twenty-eight feet, and has a gable roof. The house is situated on the American Revolutionary War location, Fort Freeland, and was also the site of grist and sawmills (1772), a fulling mill (1806), and later commercial enterprises.
