= Shade Township, Pennsylvania =

Township in Pennsylvania, US

Coordinates: 40°06′33″N 78°48′15″W

Shade Township, Somerset County, Pennsylvania
- Township
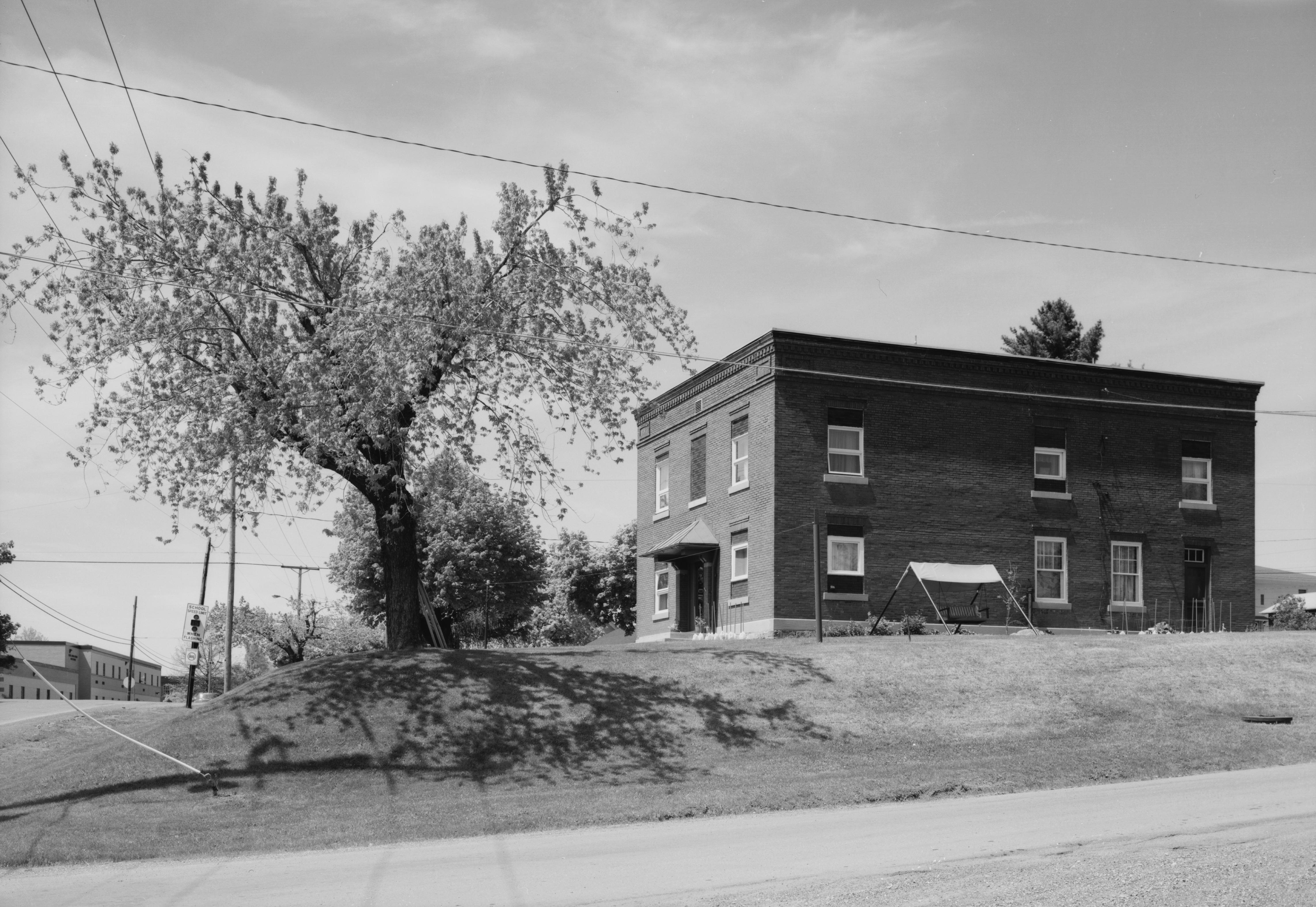
- Buildings in Cairnbrook

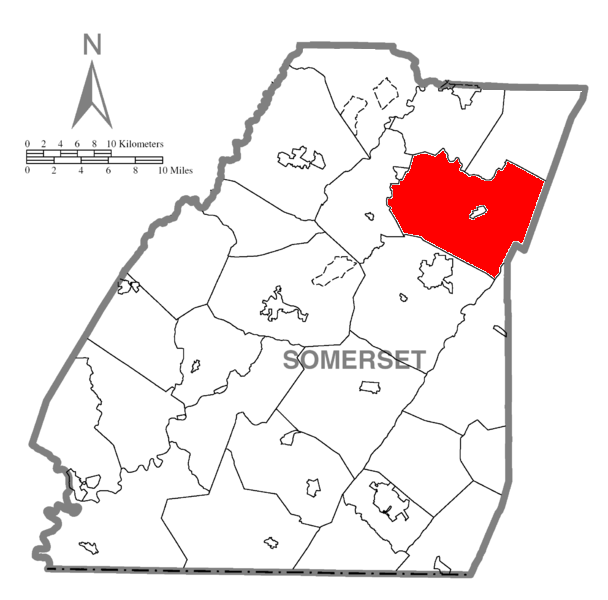
- Map of Somerset County, Pennsylvania Highlighting Shade Township

- Map of Somerset County, Pennsylvania
- Country: United States
- State: Pennsylvania
- County: Somerset

Area
  - Total: 68.76 sq mi (178.09 km^{2})
  - Land: 68.73 sq mi (178.00 km^{2})
  - Water: 0.035 sq mi (0.09 km^{2})

Population (2020)
  - Total: 2,452 ▼
  - Estimate (2021): 2,432
  - Density: 38.3/sq mi (14.79/km^{2})
- Time zone: UTC-5 (Eastern (EST))
  - Summer (DST): UTC-4 (EDT)
- FIPS code: 42-111-69448

Shade Township is a township in Somerset County, Pennsylvania, United States. The population was 2,452 at the 2020 census. It is part of the Johnstown, Pennsylvania, Metropolitan Statistical Area.

== History ==
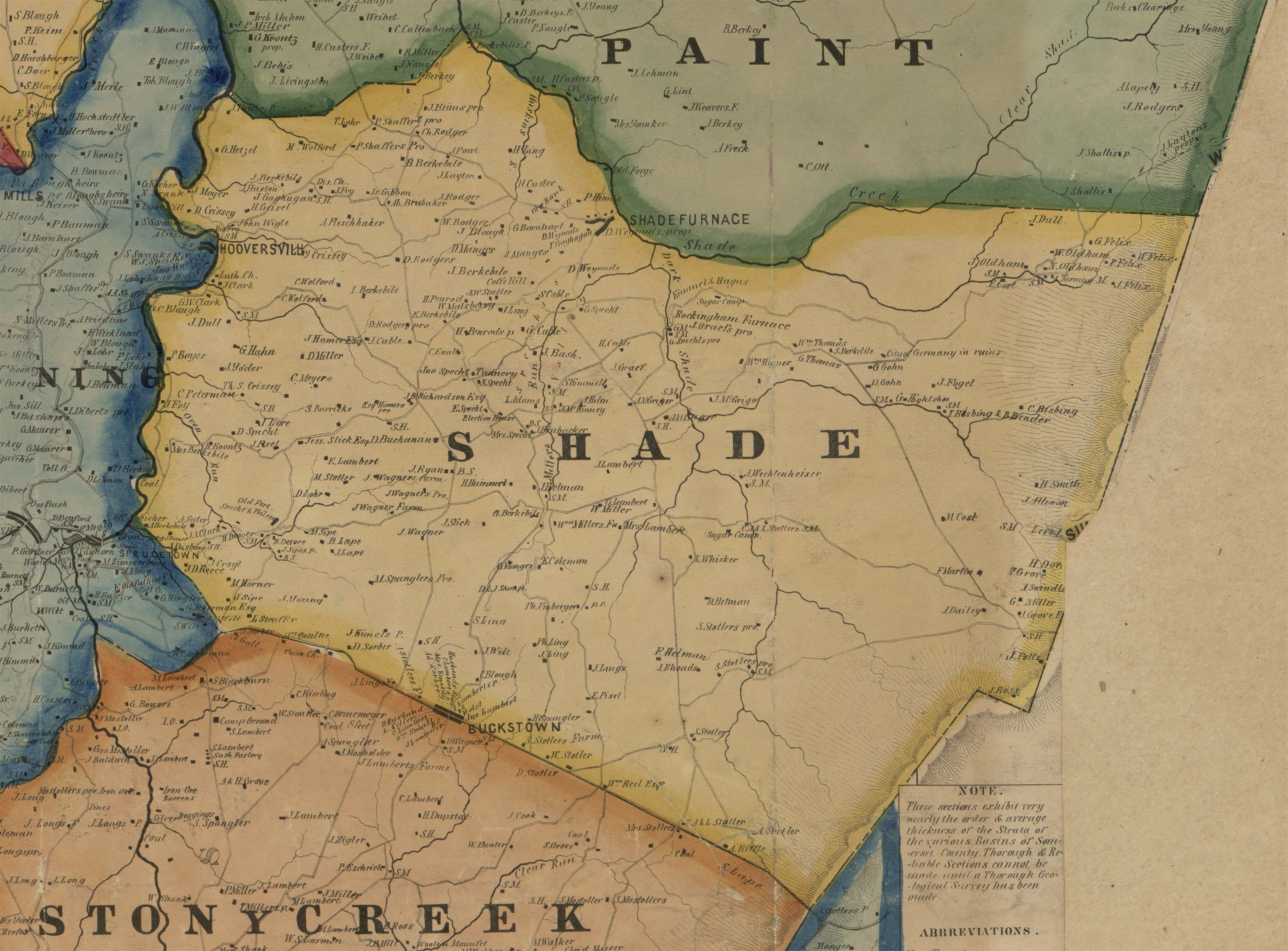
Shade Township, Somerset County, Pennsylvania, 1860

Shade Township is named after Shade Creek. The township was incorporated in 1816. It was first settled in 1772 and was formed from Stoneycreek Township, which was one of the six original townships in Somerset County.

Some of the earliest settlers were Caspar Statler, Jacob Moses, Daniel Gibler, Christian Brollier, and George Lambert. Christian Brollier built the township's first gristmill sometime before 1800, and George Lambert built the first sawmill about 1800. William Oldham built a sawmill in 1830, a gristmill in 1833, and Rockingham Furnace in 1841.

The main Borough of Shade Township is Central City, which was first settled in 1848 and was incorporated on May 6, 1918. Hooversville, which sits astride the border of Shade and Quemahoning Townships, was first settled in 1836 and was incorporated in 1896.

== Geography ==
According to the United States Census Bureau, the township has a total area of 67.2 square miles (174.0 km^{2}), of which 67.1 square miles (173.8 km^{2}) is land and 0.1 square miles (0.2 km^{2}) (0.10%) is water. Shade Township is located in the northeastern portion of Somerset County. It is bounded to the north by Ogle and Paint Townships, to the west by Quemahoning Township, to the southwest by Stonycreek Township, to the southeast by Allegheny Township, and to the east by Bedford County. U.S. Route 30 / the Lincoln Highway runs along the township's southwestern border with Stonycreek Township. Pennsylvania Route 160 passes through Shade Township as it heads north from Stonycreek Township to Paint Township. Pennsylvania Route 160 & U.S. Route 30 / the Lincoln Highway intersect in Reels Corner.

== Towns and Villages ==
=== Cairnbrook ===
In the central part of Shade Township is a mining town laid out in 1912 by the Lolayhanna Coal and Coke Company on the Jacob McGregor Farm. It is located on the west bank of Dark Shade Creek along State Route 160. It is the largest unincorporated town in Shade Township, with a present population of 750. The Cairnbrook post office was established here in 1914. The first postmaster was Charles Severn and the present one is Jennings Reitz (as of 1964). The Shade-Central City Union, Junior-Senior High, and elementary schools are located here. The Graef Lutheran Church and parsonage were erected here in 1917–18 at the corner of McGregor Avenue and Third Street. Dorfman and Hoffman established a clothing factory here in 1955, which employs approximately 185 workers at the present time.

Cairnbrook, although not incorporated, owns and operates its own water company, sewers and disposal plant, and street lighting, under the management of the Cairnbrook Improvement Company, Inc. Each property owner is a stockholder in the company. All streets are hard-surfaced and lighted.

The Cairnbrook Historic District was added to the National Register of Historic Places in 1994.

=== Reitz #2 ===
Reitz #2, a small mining town east of Cairnbrook, just off Route 160, was laid out on the Thomas Mock Farm in 1916 by the Reitz Coal Company.

=== Reitz #3 and #4 ===
Reitz #3 and #4 are small mining towns southeast of Central City, along Dark Shade Creek. Reitz #3 was laid out by John Lochrie in 1916 on the George Manges Farm. Reitz # 4 was laid out under the management of the Reitz Coal Company in 1918–19 on the Moses Walker Farm. It is the second largest town in Shade Township.

=== Wilbur ===
Wilbur is a small mining town in the western part of the township, one-half mile off Route 403. The town was founded by the Wilbur Coal Mining Company in 1912 on lands formerly owned by Daniel Peterman and J. E. Johnson. The Otterbein United Methodist Church and cemetery are located here.

=== Rockingham ===
Rockingham is a small mining village along Dark Shade Creek on State Route 160. The village is located on the site of the old Rockingham Iron Furnace, erected in 1841. The village was rebuilt in 1916 by William Gahagen. The Rockingham post office was established in 1922.

=== Gahagen ===
Gahagen is a small mining village in the southeastern part of the township. It was established by the Gahagen Coal Company in 1919. The post office was established in 1922 and closed in 1956.

=== Buckstown ===
Buckstown is a small village in the southern part of Shade Township; part of this village is in northern Stonycreek Township. The village is located along the Lincoln Highway / U.S. Route 30, formerly known as the Pittsburgh-Philadelphia Turnpike and in colonial times as the Pennsylvania Road or Forbes Road. Edmunds Swamp, named for Edmund Cartlidge, is about 2.5 miles to the north.

=== Shade Furnace ===
Shade Furnace was the first furnace built in Somerset County. George Lambert from 1805 to 1808 held a warrant for a tract land called "furnace seat". Thomas Vikroy was owner from 1808 to 1819. Construction was started in 1808 and first blast in 1809 (bf). Per s&t Gerehart and Reynolds were the builders in 1807 or 1808 (s&t). It was then operated by various owners; Mark Richards and Benjamin Jones 1819 to 1846, forge constructed, Henry Little for 6 months in 1846, John and William Shyrock 1846–47, Robert Bingham, William Shyrock and Andrew Royer 1847 to 1850, Daniel Weyand 1850 to 1880. The furnace and forge were abandoned about 1858. The heirs of Daniel Weyland estate owned the property from 1880 to 1975, when the furnace property and 350 acres surrounding it were obtained by the Historical and Genealogical Society of Somerset County, who are attempting preservation and minor archaeological work in the area.

The Shade Furnace Archaeological District was added to the National Register of Historic Places in 2008.

== Demographics ==
Historical population
Census	Pop.	Note	%±
2010	2,774		—
2020	2,452		−11.6%
2021 (est.)	2,432		−0.8%
U.S. Decennial Census

As of the census of 2000, there were 2,886. people, 1,171 households, and 832 families residing in the township. The population density was 43.0 inhabitants per square mile (16.6/km^{2}). There were 1,276 housing units at an average density of 19.0/sq mi (7.3/km^{2}). The racial makeup of the township was 99.38% White, 0.07% African American, 0.03% Native American, 0.03% Asian, and 0.49% from two or more races. Hispanic or Latino of any race were 0.52% of the population.

There were 1,171 households, out of which 27.2% had children under the age of 18 living with them, 58.2% were married couples living together, 8.2% had a female householder with no husband present, and 28.9% were non-families. 25.0% of all households were made up of individuals, and 15.0% had someone living alone who was 65 years of age or older. The average household size was 2.46 and the average family size was 2.94.

In the township the population was spread out, with 21.9% under the age of 18, 7.2% from 18 to 24, 26.5% from 25 to 44, 25.6% from 45 to 64, and 18.8% who were 65 years of age or older. The median age was 41 years. For every 100 females there were 103.0 males. For every 100 females age 18 and over, there were 99.0 males.

The median income for a household in the township was $28,802, and the median income for a family was $32,419. Males had a median income of $27,500 versus $18,472 for females. The per capita income for the township was $13,497. About 11.6% of families and 14.5% of the population were below the poverty line, including 25.3% of those under age 18 and 9.7% of those age 65 or over.
