= Pennsylvania House of Representatives, District 69 =

American legislative district

Pennsylvania's 69th State House of Representatives district
Representative
Carl Walker Metzgar; R–Berlin
- Population (2022): 63,457

The 69th Pennsylvania House of Representatives District is located in southern Pennsylvania and has been represented by Carl Walker Metzgar since 2009.

== District profile ==
The 69th District is located in Somerset County and includes the following areas:

- Addison
- Addison Township
- Allegheny Township
- Benson
- Berlin
- Black Township
- Boswell
- Brothersvalley Township
- Callimont
- Casselman
- Central City
- Conemaugh Township
- Confluence
- Elk Lick Township
- Fairhope Township
- Garrett
- Greenville Township
- Hooversville
- Indian Lake
- Jefferson Township
- Jenner Township
- Jennerstown
- Larimer Township
- Lincoln Township
- Lower Turkeyfoot Township
- Meyersdale
- Middlecreek Township
- Milford Township
- New Baltimore
- New Centerville
- Northampton Township
- Quemahoning Township
- Rockwood
- Salisbury
- Seven Springs (Somerset County Portion)
- Shade Township
- Shanksville
- Somerset
- Somerset Township
- Southampton Township
- Stonycreek Township
- Stoystown
- Summit Township
- Upper Turkeyfoot Township
- Ursina
- Wellersburg

== Representatives ==
Representative	Party	Years	District home	Note
Prior to 1969, seats were apportioned by county.
Kenneth S. Halverson	Republican	1969 – 1980		
William R. Lloyd, Jr.	Democrat	1981 – 1998		
Bob Bastian	Republican	1999 – 2008	Friedens	Retired
Carl Walker Metzgar	Republican	2009 – present	Berlin	Incumbent

== Recent election results ==
PA House election, 2024: Pennsylvania House, District 69
Party	Candidate	Votes	%
Republican	Carl Walker Metzgar (incumbent)	Unopposed	
Total votes		32,760	100.00
Republican hold			

PA House election, 2022: Pennsylvania House, District 69
Party	Candidate	Votes	%
Republican	Carl Walker Metzgar (incumbent)	Unopposed	
Total votes		25,771	100.00
Republican hold			

PA House election, 2020: Pennsylvania House, District 69
Party	Candidate	Votes	%
Republican	Carl Walker Metzgar (incumbent)	Unopposed	
Total votes		31,077	100.00
Republican hold			

PA House election, 2018: Pennsylvania House, District 69
Party	Candidate	Votes	%
Republican	Carl Walker Metzgar (incumbent)	19,028	79.16
Democratic	Jeff Cole	5,008	20.84
Total votes		24,036	100.00
Republican hold			

PA House election, 2016: Pennsylvania House, District 69
Party	Candidate	Votes	%
Republican	Carl Walker Metzgar (incumbent)	Unopposed	
Total votes		28,988	100.00
Republican hold			
