= Rockwood Area School District =

School district in Pennsylvania

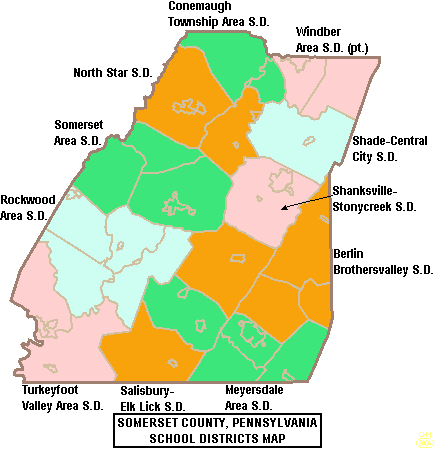

Address
- 439 Somerset Avenue Somerset County, Pennsylvania Rockwood, Pennsylvania, 15557; United States
- Coordinates: 39.918191°N 79.161169°W

District information
- Type: Public

Students and staff
- District mascot: Rockets
- Colors: red white

Other information
- Website: www.rockwoodschools.org

The Rockwood Area School District is a public school district located in Somerset County, Pennsylvania. It serves the boroughs of Rockwood, New Centerville, Casselman, and Seven Springs, plus the townships of Milford Township, Black Township, Upper Turkeyfoot Township, and Middlecreek Township in Somerset County, Pennsylvania. The district encompasses approximately 146 sq mi (380 km^{2}). According to 2007 local census data, it serves a resident population of 5,680.

== Schools ==
There is one elementary school and one secondary school, which are located in Rockwood Borough on the same piece of land.

- Rockwood Area Elementary School became the district's sole elementary school, after the closing of Kingwood Elementary in 2009. RAES serves Grades Kindergarten to Sixth.
- Rockwood Area Junior/Senior High School is the sole secondary facility in the district, serving seventh to twelfth grades.
