= Rockwood Area Junior/Senior High School =

Coordinates: 39.91730°N 79.15932°W

Location
- 437 Somerset Avenue; Rockwood, Pennsylvania 15557

Information
- School type: Public Junior/Senior High School
- Motto: Proud of our past, Promoting our present, Focused on our future
- School district: Rockwood Area School District
- NCES District ID: 4220520
- NCES School ID: 422052006210
- Supertindent/Principal: Mark Bower
- Faculty: 27.60 (FTE)
- Grades: 7-12
- Enrollment: 364 (2017-18)
- Student to teacher ratio: 13.19
- Athletics conference: PIAA District V
- Team name: Rockets
- Rival: Turkeyfoot Valley
- Yearbook: The Rocket
- Communities served: Casselman, New Centerville, Rockwood, Seven Springs
- Feeder schools: Rockwood Elementary School
- Website: Rockwood Area Junior/Senior High School

Rockwood Area Junior/Senior High School is a public junior/senior high school located in westcentral Somerset County, Pennsylvania. The school is grades 7-12 and serves about 400 students.

== Alma Mater ==
All hail to thee,
Dear Rockwood High
To thee we will be true.
With everlasting memories
We owe our best to you.
Alma mater, alma mater,
We will pledge our loyalty
With voices raised
We will sing thy praise
For all eternity

== Graduation Requirements ==
Rockwood students are required to complete 26 credits in coursework in order to participate in commencement exercises. Credits are earned in grades 9-12

| Progrsm Area | #/Credits | Notes |
|---|---|---|
| English | 4 | |
| Mathematics | 4 | includes possibility of Business Math and/or Accounting, starting with the class of 2012 |
| Science | 4 | Must include: Biology and Physical Science |
| Social Studies | 4 | Must include: World Culture, US History and American Government |
| Arts/Humanities | 1 | Must include a course entitled FACS Survival Skills that is taken during the Junior Year |
| Physical Education | 1 | 0.5 Credit during Freshman Year and .5 Credit during either the 10th, 11th, or 12th Grades |
| Health | 1 | |
| Computer Applications | 1 | |
| Electives/Expos | 5.5 | |
| TOTAL | 26 Credits | |

=== Courses Available ===
Courses at Rockwood, according to the 2011-12 Course Catalog, include:

- English
- Languages - Including Spanish and French
- Math
- Business Technology
- Computer Technology
- Computer Science
- Science
- Agricultural Science
- Social Studies
- Yearbook
- Art
- Engineering & Technology
- Music - Including Vocal Groups
- Family and Consumer Sciences - Includes the FACS Required Course: Survival Skills
- Health / Physical Education
- Volunteer Courses - Includes: Partners (A peer to peer match with a disabled student), Library Aide and Gym Aide

=== Vocational Education ===
Students in grades 10-12 who wish to pursue training in a specific career path or field may attend the Somerset County Technology Center in Somerset Township.

== Athletics ==
Rockwood Area participates in PIAA District V: Students come from Turkeyfoot Valley to participate in Football, Golf, Soccer, and Volleyball, while students from Berlin Brothersvalley come to participate in Wrestling.

| Sport | Boys/Class | Girls/Class |
|---|---|---|
| Baseball | Class A | |
| Basketball | Class A | Class A |
| Football | Class A | |
| Golf | Class AAAA | Class AAAA |
| Rifle | Class AAAA | Class AAAA |
| Soccer | Class A | Class A |
| Softball | | Class A |
| Tennis | | Class A |
| Track and Field | Class AA | Class A |
| Volleyball | | Class A |
| Wrestling | Class AA | |
