= Casselman River =

Stream in Maryland and Pennsylvania, US

Casselman Tributary to Youghiogheny River
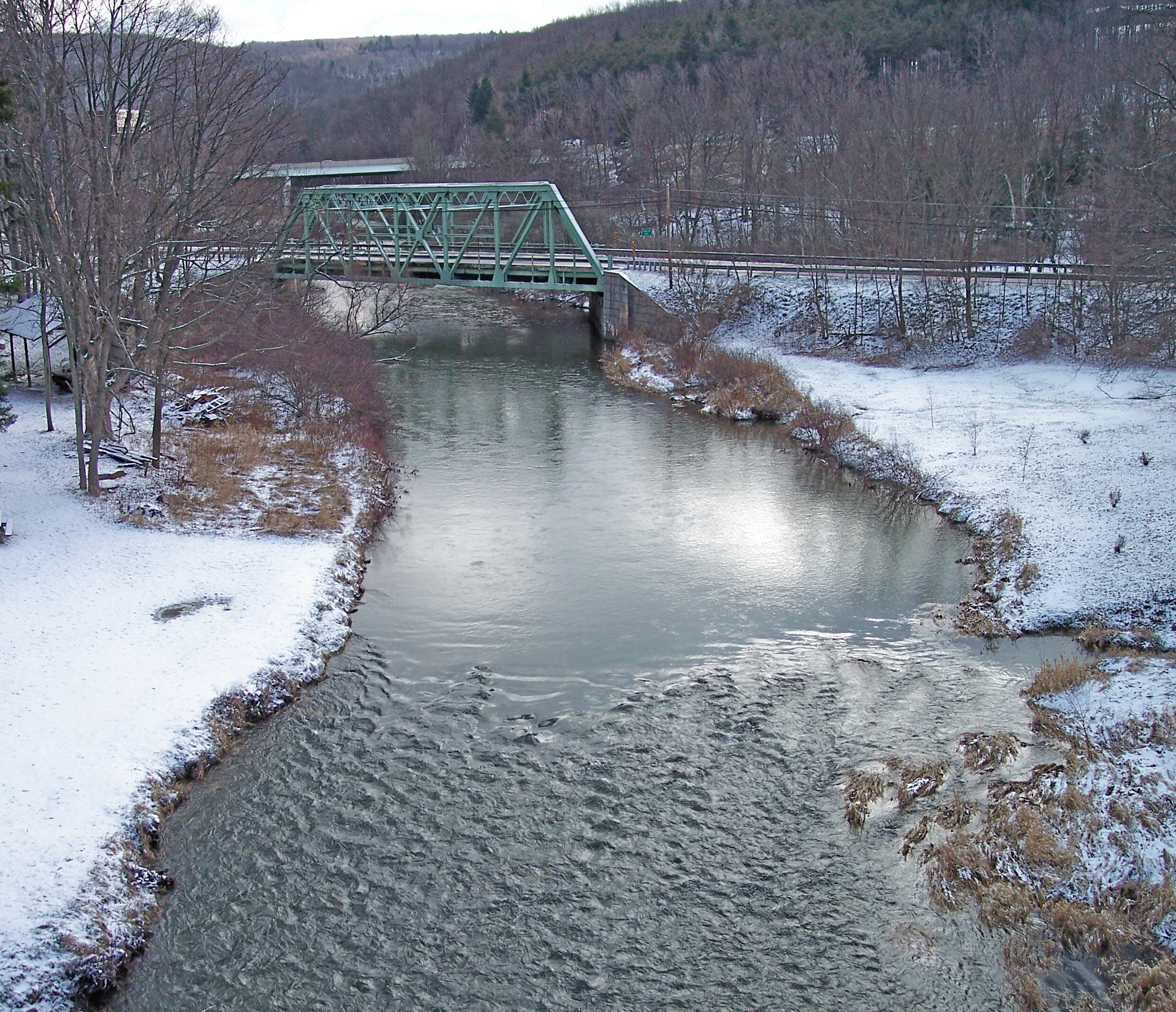
- The Casselman River in Casselman River Bridge State Park near Grantsville, Maryland

- Location of Casselman River mouth Casselman River (the United States)

Location
- Country: United States
- State: Pennsylvania; Maryland
- County: Somerset (PA); Garrett (MD)
- Borough: Casselman; Rockwood; Meyersdale; Confluence; Salisbury; Ursina; Garrett
- Town: Grantsville

Physical characteristics
- Source: confluence of North and South Branch Casselman River divide
  - location: about 0.25 miles south-southeast of Casselman, Maryland
  - coordinates: 39°42′30″N 079°07′02″W
  - elevation: 2,160 ft (660 m)
- Mouth: Youghiogheny River
  - location: Confluence, Pennsylvania
  - coordinates: 39°48′54″N 079°21′53″W
  - elevation: 1,312 ft (400 m)
- Length: 55.28 mi (88.96 km)
- Basin size: 593.06 square miles (1,536.0 km^{2})
- Discharge
  - location: Youghiogheny River
  - average: 1,208.58 cu ft/s (34.223 m^{3}/s) at mouth with Youghiogheny River

Basin features
- Progression: southwest
- River system: Monongahela River
- Tributaries
  - left: Spiker Run, Shade Run, Slaubaugh Run, Crab Run, Flag Run, Tub Mill Run, Elklick Creek, Bigby Creek, Miller Run, Shaler Run, Stony Batter Run, Rhoades Creek, Town Line Run, Lost Run, McClintock Run, Cucumber Run, Whites Creek
  - right: Schoolhouse Run, Meadow Run, Piney Creek, Miller Run, Flaugherty Creek, Blue Lick Creek, Swamp Creek, Buffalo Creek, Piney Run, Weimer Run, Coxes Creek, South Glade Creek, Middle Creek, Laurel Hill Creek
- Bridges: Maple Grove Road, I-68/Us 219, US 40, River Road (x2), Ord Street, Coal Run Road, Shaw Mines Road, US 219, Broadway Street, US 219, Great Allegheny Passage, Petenbrink Road, Berlin Street, Rockdale Road, Markleton School Road, Listonburg Road, Robert Brown Road

The Casselman River is a 56.5-mile-long (90.9 km) tributary of the Youghiogheny River in western Maryland and Pennsylvania in the United States. The Casselman River drains an area of 576 square miles.

The river has been used for transportation across the Allegheny Mountains, between the cities of Baltimore and Washington, D.C., in the east and Pittsburgh in the west. Two railroads followed the Casselman River from Meyersdale, Pennsylvania, to Confluence. First is the B&O Railroad, running between Baltimore and Pittsburgh, which was completed in 1871, and is currently owned by CSX. Second is the Western Maryland Railway, which ran from Cumberland, Maryland, to Connellsville, Pennsylvania. Although the Western Maryland was abandoned in the 1980s, the right-of-way has been converted into the Great Allegheny Passage, a rail trail bicycle and hiking path.

== Variant names ==
According to the Geographic Names Information System, it has also been known historically as:

- Casselmans River
- Castleman River
- Castleman's River
- Castlmans River
- Little Youghiogheny
- Old Town Creek
- Yockie Geni

== Course ==
The Casselman River rises in Garrett County atop the plateau of western Maryland as two branches, the south one east of Meadow Mountain, the north one farther west, between Meadow Mountain and Negro Mountain. The two branches flow northward, combining just southwest of Grantsville, Maryland. The river then continues north into Pennsylvania, following a great arc across the Laurel Highlands of Somerset County to the community of Confluence, where Laurel Hill Creek joins a few meters above the Youghiogheny River.

On passing from Maryland into Pennsylvania, the Casselman River flows through Elk Lick Township, passing by West Salisbury and Boynton; Summit Township, flowing through Meyersdale and Garrett; and Black Township, coming to Rockwood and turning southwest. The Casselman River then forms a natural boundary between Black and Addison Townships on the southeast and Milford, Upper Turkeyfoot, and Lower Turkeyfoot Townships on the northwest, flowing past Casselman, Markleton, and Fort Hill along its way to Confluence.

== Tributaries ==
In Pennsylvania, the tributaries of Flag Run, Meadow Run, Tub Mill Run, Piney Creek, Coal Run, Miller Run, Flaugherty Creek, Elklick Creek, Blue Lick Creek, and Swamp Creek all flow into the Casselman before it reaches Garrett, where Buffalo Creek and Bigby Creek add their waters. Lick Run, Shafer Run, and Stony Batter Run join the Casselman River before it reaches Rockwood, where Coxes Creek and Rhoads Creek meet the river. South Glade Creek, Middle Creek, Town Line Run, McClintock Run, Cucumber Run, Whites Creek, and Laurel Hill Creek all join the Casselman, before it flows into the Youghiogheny River at Confluence.

== See also ==
- List of rivers of Maryland
- List of rivers of Pennsylvania
