= Deer Valley YMCA Family Camp =

Summer camp in Fort Hill, Pennsylvania

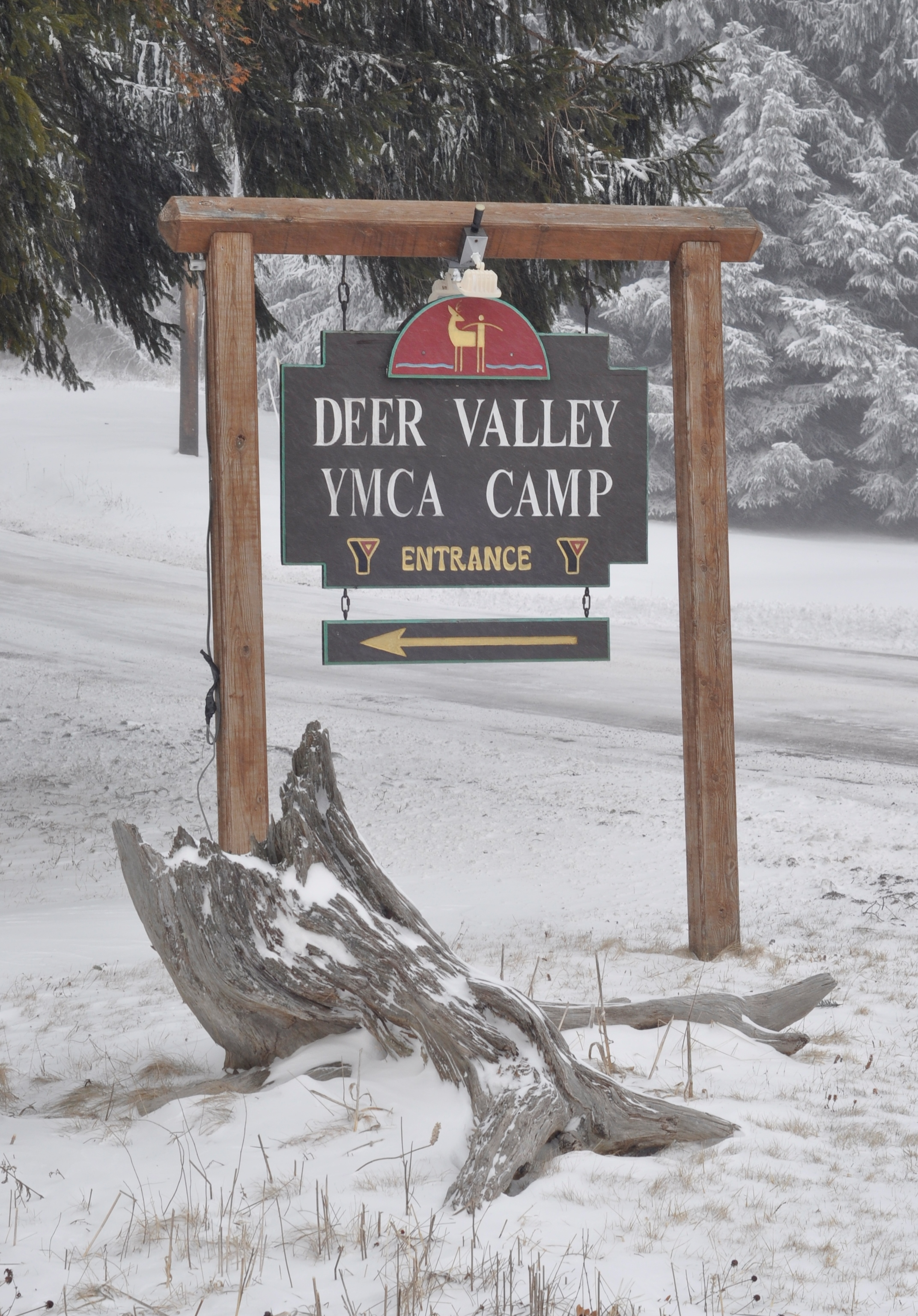
- Interactive map of Deer Valley YMCA Family Camp
- Location: Fort Hill, Pennsylvania
- Coordinates: 39.79838°N 79.18962°W
- Operated by: YMCA of Pittsburgh
- Established: 1956
- Website: deervalleyymca.org

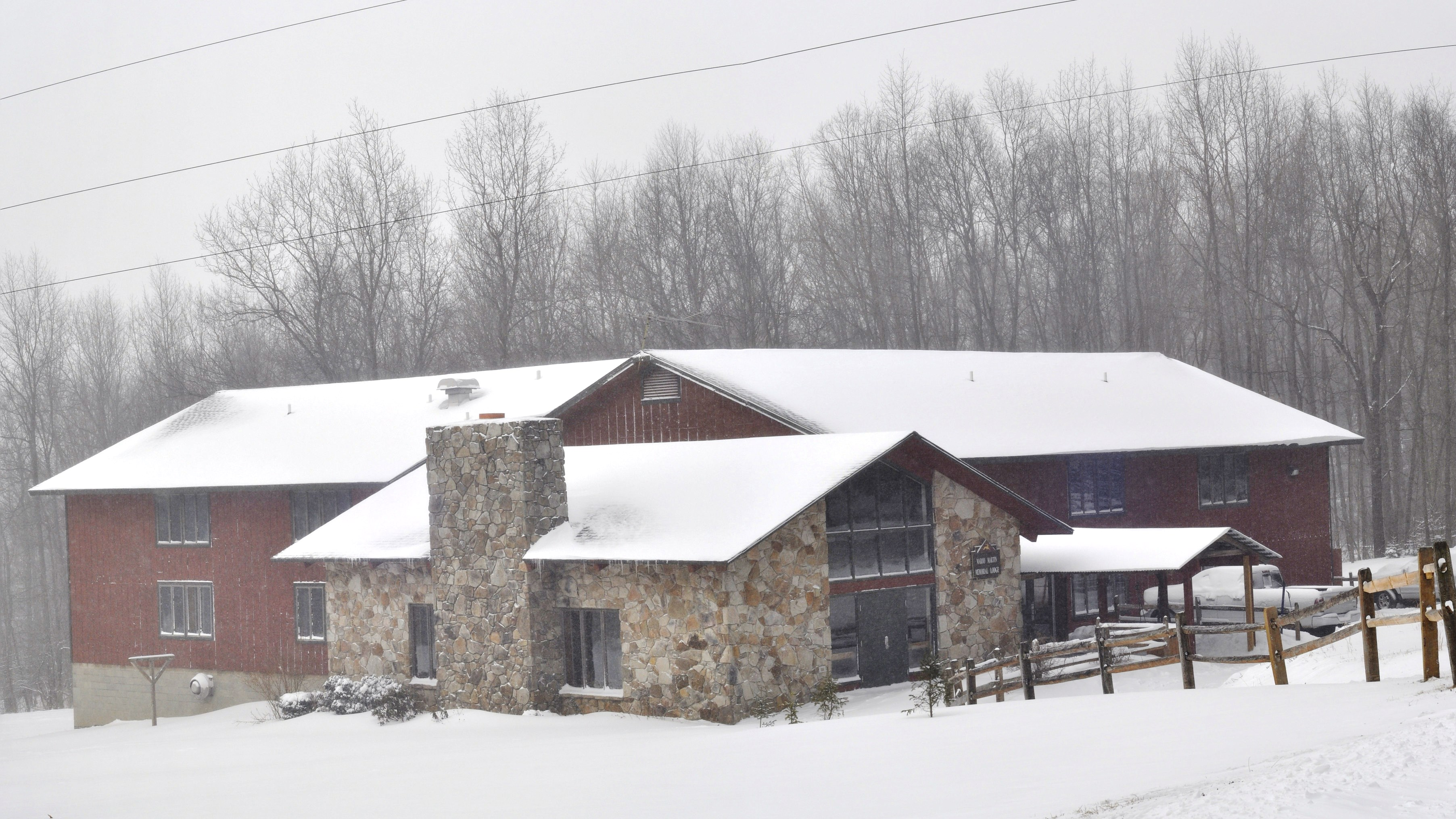
Mario Martin Lodge

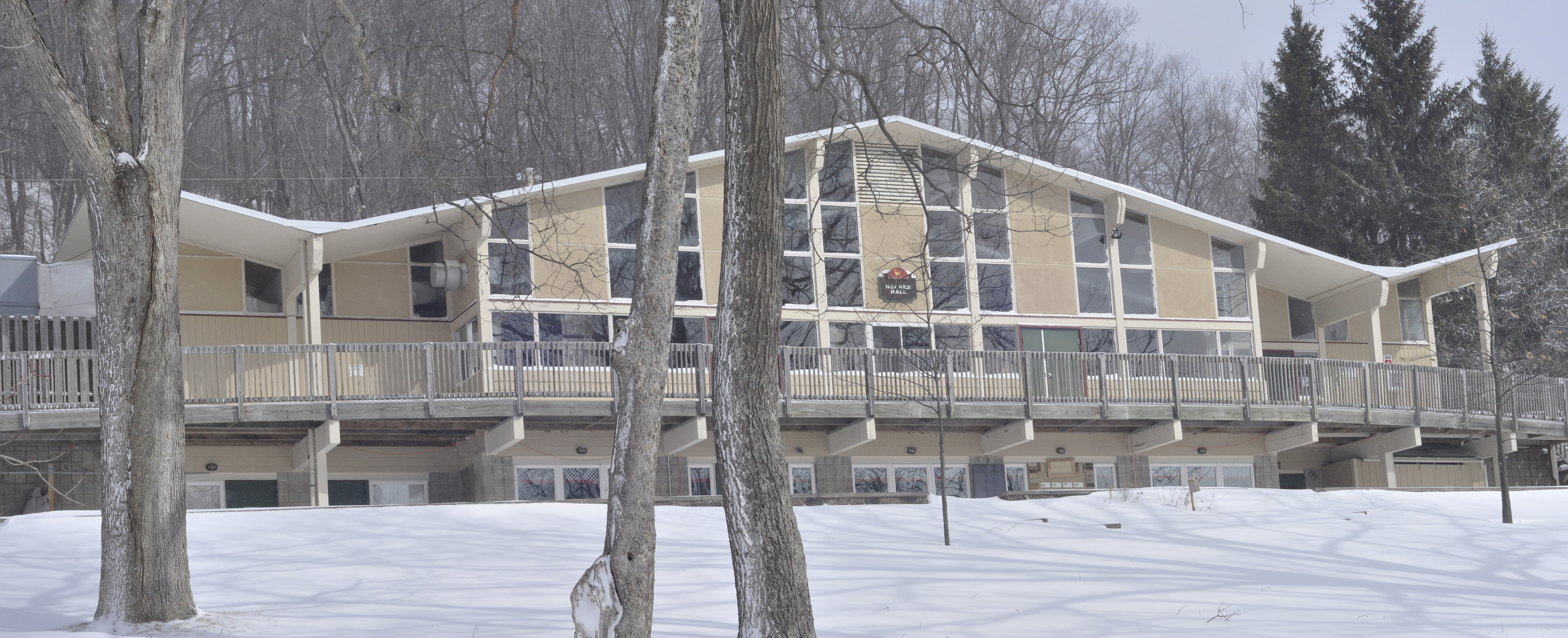
Hecker Hall

Deer Valley YMCA Camp is a YMCA summer camp located between Fort Hill, Pennsylvania and Meyersdale, Pennsylvania. It sits on 742 acres of mountainous lands near Mount Davis, the highest peak in Pennsylvania, and includes 125-acre Deer Valley Lake. Deer Valley operates ten months out of the year and offers summer camp experience to families and various organizations from all around the country.

== History ==
The land that Deer Valley currently occupies belonged to the family of Howard G. Peck from about the time of the Revolutionary War. In the year of 1931 Curtis Howe "Doc" Springer came from Florida to open a health resort. He purchased and constructed his resort on the Peck property. “Haven of Rest” was a free resort, running solely on donations. Springer was forced to close the resort in 1937 when the cost of construction resulted in money problems. The land was reverted to Howard Peck. Soon after, Captain Colon B. Harris rented the land and the winter resort “Ski Trains” was born. This resort became well known throughout the late 1930s among the neighboring states. But in the year 1938 Harris left to take a job in Washington DC, and due to the poor health of Howard Peck, resulted in the sale of the Deer Valley property to The Independent Order of Odd Fellows (I.O.O.F.). The I.O.O.F had plans to open a vacation spot for families but due to disagreements forfeited the land back to Howard Peck. During this time a group of six men purchased the land. They named the new company “Deer Valley Inc” and went about constructing a large 125-acre lake on the property. Deer Valley Inc. tried to sell the property to the Boy Scouts but was unsuccessful. The Director of Camping Services for the Pittsburgh YMCA Thomas Reid Alexander was then introduced to the property by his son, Thomas Reid Alexander Jr. On December 30, 1952 the YMCA of Pittsburgh purchased the property and is still the current owner. Thomas Reid Alexander Sr, his Wife Gladys, their children Molly and Thomas ran the camp at Deer Valley, until Thomas Reid Alexander's death in 1966.

In 1957 Deer Valley YMCA Family Camp opened for the first season of family camp. This first summer the camp served 838 campers, during an eight-week season. In 1972 the camp underwent construction to winterize the facilities to become a year-round experience and now operates 10 months out of the year.
