= Markleton, Pennsylvania =

Unincorporated community in Pennsylvania, US

- Unincorporated community
- Location within Pennsylvania
- Coordinates: 39°51′38″N 79°13′37″W
- Country: United States
- State: Pennsylvania
- County: Somerset
- Elevation: 1,693 ft (516 m)
- Time zone: UTC-5 (Eastern (EST))
  - Summer (DST): UTC-4 (EDT)
- ZIP code: 15551
- Area code: 814
- GNIS feature ID: 1180426

Markleton is an unincorporated community that is located in Somerset County, Pennsylvania, United States. The community is situated near the Casselman River, 7.7 miles (12.4 km) east-northeast of Confluence.

== History ==
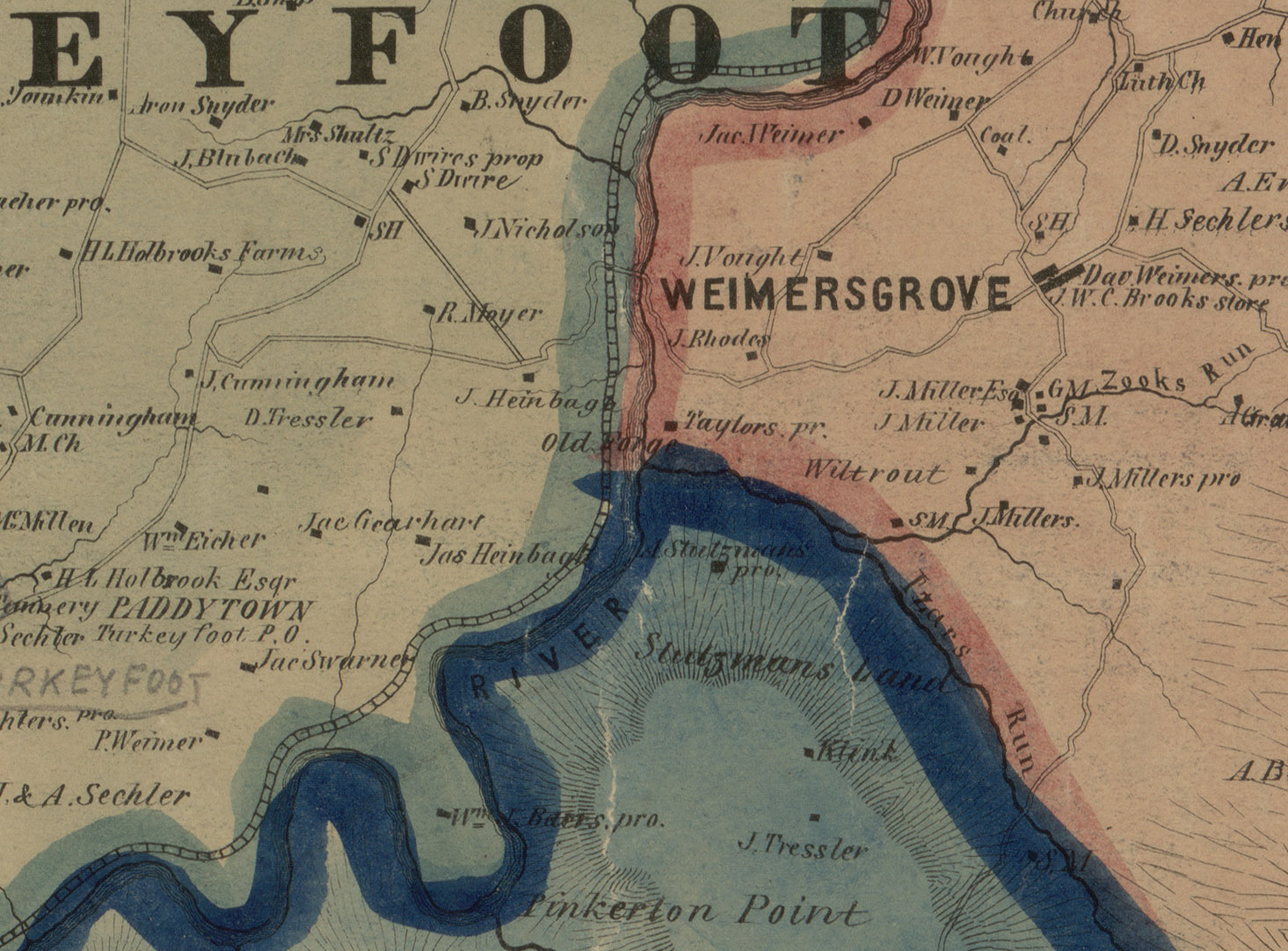
Markleton ("Old Forge") Area, Somerset County, Pennsylvania, 1860

=== Philson's Forge ===
The area was initially known as Philson's Forge. Its name was derived from a Catalan forge, or bloomery, that was built by Robert Philson near the Casselman River sometime around 1810. The forge was not successful, however, and was closed circa 1823.

=== Markle Paper Works ===
Markleton derived its present name from the paper company of Cyrus P. Markle & Sons of West Newton in nearby Westmoreland County. C.P. Markle & Sons purchased 5,000 acres along the Casselman River in 1881 and constructed a paper mill in order to harvest the abundant trees of the mountainside and manufacture paper products; at least 1,000 acres of this land were purchased from the Pinkerton Lumber Company.

In addition to the pulp mill and its equipment, the operation consisted of thirteen two-story houses for workers, plus a home for the superintendent and a boarding house. Unfortunately, the paper mill was not very profitable, and the endeavor was short-lived.

=== Markleton Sanatorium ===
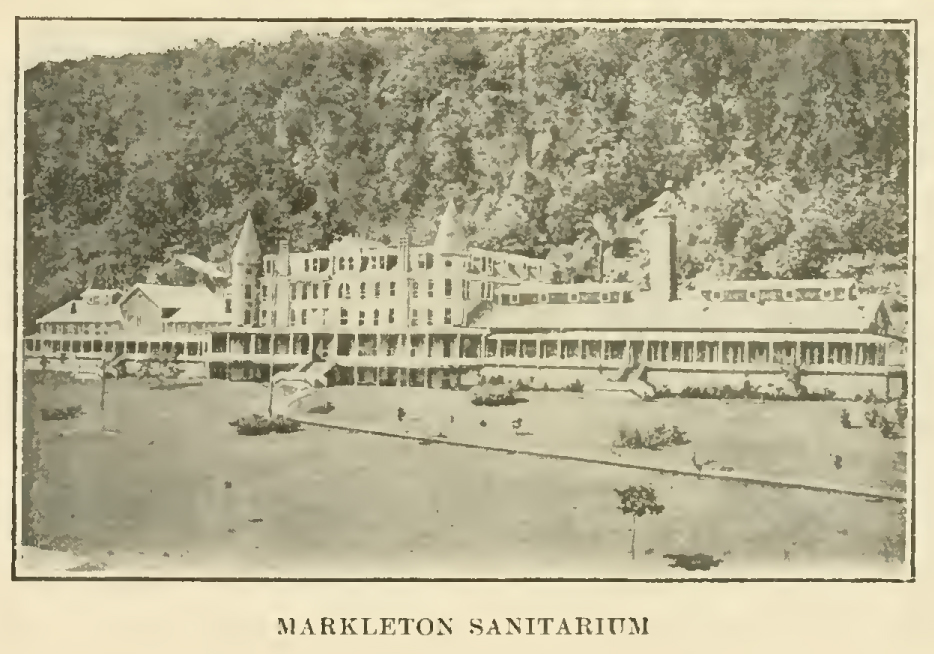
Markleton Sanitarium, circa 1909

The Markle buildings and land were purchased by William J. Hitchman of Mount Pleasant, Pennsylvania, in late 1886 for the purpose of establishing a combination vacation resort/health sanatorium. Mr. Hitchman was joined in this initiative by Dr. Matthew B. Gault of Clifton Springs, New York, and Rev. John Morrison Barnett of Washington, Pennsylvania, and they formed the Markleton Hotel Company, which was officially known as the "Markleton Sanitarium and Hotel Company." Dr. Gault had been appointed the first medical director of the Clifton Springs Sanitarium in 1875. Rev. Barnett was a Presbyterian minister and a financial administrator at Washington & Jefferson College.

Other figures important to the sanatorium's establishment were William Borland Neel, Emer Judson McElwee, Oliver Perry Shupe, James J. Neel, Dr. James A. Loar, and Johnston Borndallar Jordan, all of Mount Pleasant; Dr. J.C. McClanathan of Connellsville; and Dr. Shoemaker of Dawson. Dr. John Dennis Carr worked there from 1899 until 1903. Dr. M. Annie Howe-Anthony, a graduate of the Woman's Medical College of Baltimore, spent a year at the Markleton Sanatorium, during which she was the only female physician present. Asked about her experience there later, she said, "The year at Markleton was an interesting and happy one, for there a woman physician was always honored and treated with the greatest respect." Dr. Hugh S. Maxwell, a 1904 graduate of Rush Medical College in Chicago, was an assistant physician for part of 1905. William Page McIntosh, a 1910 graduate of the University of Pennsylvania's medical school, served as a medical director of the Markleton Sanitarium, and Isaac Slaymaker Diller, a 1912 graduate of the same school, worked at the sanitarium as an assistant physician.

The two main papermill buildings were combined into a grand hotel, and the workers' houses were remodeled as private cottages.

According to the Baltimore & Ohio Railroad's Resorts and Springs guide for Summer 1905, the sanitarium had a capacity for 150 guests and charged rates from $2.50 per day to $60.00 per month.

The Markleton Sanatorium was also the site of several meetings of various medical associations, including the Somerset County Medical Society and the Tri-State (PA, MD, WV) Medical Association.

=== U.S. Army General Hospital No. 17 ===
After the United States entered World War I, the federal government operated the former sanatorium building as U.S. Army General Hospital No. 17. The facilities were leased on Feb. 25, 1918; personnel arrived in March, and the hospital was opened in April. The hospital was designated by Army Surgeon General Merritte W. Ireland as specializing in the treatment of soldiers suffering from tuberculosis. The need to find treatment facilities that could serve as tuberculosis hospitals likely influenced the selection of the Markleton Sanatorium as an Army general hospital; it was comparably smaller than other Army general hospitals and it did not have space for easy expansion, but very few owners wanted to lease their buildings for the treatment of tuberculosis patients and the military's need was great.

On July 31, 1918, the Markleton hospital was designated as one of the Army's hospitals focused on "physical reconstruction" in order to help soldiers make as complete a recovery, both mental and physical, as possible; however, the results of the comprehensive physical reconstruction emphasis were not as successful at Markleton as at other locations, due to its smaller size. General Hospital No. 17 had a capacity for 200 patients, which it reached in August 1918 and consistently maintained until it was closed on March 27, 1919.

The patients and staff of the hospital published a semi-monthly newspaper entitled Star Shell. A fire occurred at the hospital in early 1918. Some of the U.S. Army medical personnel who were assigned at various times to the Markleton hospital included Lieutenant Urban Henry Reidt, Lieutenant Joseph Daniel Rosenthal, Lieutenant J.B. Stenbuck, Lieutenant Charles B. Sylvester, Lieutenant James C. Thompson, Captain Henry Kennon Dunham, Captain Samuel M. Marcus, Major Henry Williamson Hoagland, Major John O. Kinter, and Major Benjamin Franklin Van Meter. Some of the nurses who served at the hospital included Ila Broadus; Agnes Julia Hasenfuss, Pauline Wilson, Laura Anderton, Myra F. Rhodes, Edith M. Mitchell, & Miriam A. Wilson; Estella M. Campbell, Mary Homan, & E. Lorraine Green; Josephine Amada Grima Comstock; Edith Head, Margaret A. Pedersen, Sara A. Carr, & Pluma M. Geesey; Anna E. Flood, Urma Klahr Turner Elswick, Grace Louise Sirine Royden, & Grace Sechler; Ruth E. Anderson; Cora L. Field; Florence Dawson & Irene G. Clark; Eugenia Mary Hitchcock, Matilda Clifton, Marie O'Brien, & Helen J. Woodbridge; Flora Hauster, Rava Hughes Kelly, Jennie Wilson Lyons, & Helen W. Ross; and Anna K. Ward.

=== U.S. Public Health Service Hospital No. 47 ===
After serving as U.S. Army General Hospital No. 17, the building then became U.S. Public Health Service Hospital No. 47, beginning on November 22, 1919. However, this role did not last for long; Public Health Service Hospital No. 47 was closed about a year later. Some believed that it was not best suited for the purpose of treating tuberculosis patients, and federal officials agreed. While the Markleton U.S.P.H.S. hospital did operate, though, it again served as the site of another meeting of the Somerset County Medical Society. Eventually, without the flow of people brought in by the sanatorium / hospital, the Baltimore & Ohio Railroad closed its ticket agency at Markleton on Jan. 9, 1924.

== Nearby Historical Railroad Tunnels ==
Several railroad tunnels were built just downstream from Markleton as the Casselman River flows southwest towards Fort Hill and Confluence.

=== Pinkerton Tunnels ===
Pinkerton Point, also known as Pinkerton Horn, juts out from the mountainside from the northwest to the southeast, forcing the river to bend around it. The Baltimore & Ohio Railroad built a tunnel through the point in 1871. A fire broke out in October 1879, destroying the original tunnel and necessitating the construction of a rail line following the river around the point. The tunnel was rebuilt, and it reopened in 1885.

The Western Maryland Railway constructed another tunnel through Pinkerton Point as it built its track in 1911. Since the Western Maryland track was on the opposite side of the Casselman River from the B&O track, two bridges were also constructed, allowing trains to travel across the river, through the mountainside, and then back across the river. This bridge-&-tunnel sequence is now part of the Great Allegheny Passage rail trail.

=== Shoo Fly Tunnel ===
A view of the nearby Shoo Fly Tunnel appeared in a collection of photographs from along the Baltimore and Ohio Railroad's rail lines that was published in book form in 1872 and digitized by the DeGolyer Library, Southern Methodist University. Significant enhancements were made to it in 1897 and 1902.

=== Daylighting ===
The B&O Pinkerton Tunnel and the Shoo Fly Tunnel were daylighted in 2012 as part of the National Gateway project.

== Geography ==
Markleton is located along the southeastern edge of Upper Turkeyfoot Township. It lies along Markleton School Road, to the east of Pennsylvania Route 281, south of the village of Kingwood and north of Fort Hill. Mount Zion Cemetery is located on top of the hill above Markleton, alongside the former Mt. Zion United Brethren Church, which was formed in 1889.

Markleton has a post office with ZIP code 15551. The post office is on the western bank of the Casselman River, nestled between the river and CSX Transportation's Keystone Subdivision rail line. Across the river from the post office is a trail access area for the Great Allegheny Passage rail trail. This is the only trail access area with parking between Fort Hill to the southwest and Rockwood to the northeast.

A short-lived Lutheran church had been established on the eastern side of the Casselman River in the early 1880s. Rev J.B. Shoup had oversight of the endeavor, and the cornerstone of the physical building was laid on April 28, 1882.
