= Turkeyfoot Valley Area School District =

School district in Pennsylvania

Coordinates: 39.793°N 79.311°W

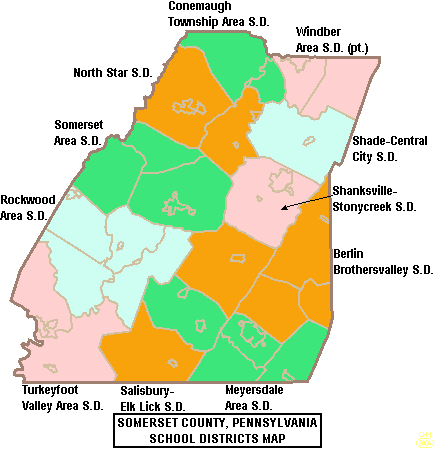

Address
- 172 Turkeyfoot Road Confluence, Pennsylvania, 15424; United States

District information
- Type: Public

Students and staff
- District mascot: Ram
- Colors: Blue and Gold

Other information
- Website: http://www.turkeyfoot.k12.pa.us/

The Turkeyfoot Valley Area School District is a small, rural school district located in the Southwestern portion of Somerset County, Pennsylvania. The school district serves the municipalities of Addison, Addison Township, Confluence, Lower Turkeyfoot Township and Ursina. It encompasses approximately 102 square miles. According to 2000 federal census data, it serves a resident population of 3,093. As of 2009, the per capita income was $14,042 while the median family income was $31,825.

== School District History ==
In 1950, the jointure of the Addison Borough, Addison Township, Confluence Borough, Lower Turkeyfoot Township and Ursina Borough school districts were formed to create the Turkeyfoot Valley Area School District.TVASD History Page

== Schools ==
All students attend school in one building, which is called Turkeyfoot Valley Area School, located on State Route 523 in the village of Harnedsville. This Structure was built in 1956 and only housed grades 7-12 at the time, the 1956 brick, concrete and steel building was $658,584.22. In 1967, the new elementary building was added to the high school. The cost of construction was $864,876.22. The campus was renovated in 1996.

Grade Levels

School name	Grade Level
Turkeyfoot Valley Area Elementary School	K4-6
Turkeyfoot Valley Area Junior/Senior High School	7-12

== Extracurriculars ==
The district offers a variety of clubs, activities and sports.

=== Sports ===
Sport(Grades)	Boys (PIAA Class)	Girls(PIAA Class)
Baseball (9-12),	A
Basketball (7-12)	A	A
Rifle (9-12)	AAAA	AAAA
Softball (9-12)		A
