= Kenneth Halverson =

American politician (1933–2021)

Kenneth S. Halverson

Member of the Pennsylvania House of Representatives from the 69th district
- In office 1969–1980
- Preceded by: District created
- Succeeded by: William R. Lloyd, Jr.

Member of the Pennsylvania House of Representatives from the Somerset County district
- In office 1967–1968

Personal details
- Born: July 24, 1933 Somerset, Pennsylvania
- Died: January 21, 2021 (aged 87) Somerset, Pennsylvania
- Party: Republican

Kenneth Shaffer Halverson (July 24, 1933 – January 21, 2021) was a Republican member of the Pennsylvania House of Representatives. He was born in Somerset, PA, on July 24, 1933, and graduated from Somerset Area High School in 1951.

Representative Halverson was honored by the a resolution passed at the 1980 Annual Meeting of the Pennsylvania Credit Union League for his consistent and strong advocacy for credit unions within the commonwealth.

Ken Halverson was also an insurance agent. Along with his wife Rita, they owned Coffee Springs Farm, an 18th-century house originally built by Harmon Husband, from which they operated their businesses: Ken Halverson Insurance Agency and Rita Halverson, Realtor.

Pennsylvania House of Representatives
Preceded by Prior to 1969, seats were by county.	Member of the Pennsylvania House of Representatives for the 69th District; 1969–1980	Succeeded by William R. Lloyd Jr.
