= William R. Lloyd Jr. =

American politician

Member of the Pennsylvania House of Representatives from the 69th district
- In office January 4, 1981 – November 30, 1998
- Preceded by: Kenneth Halverson
- Succeeded by: Bob Bastian

Personal details
- Born: October 30, 1947 (age 78) Somerset, Pennsylvania, U.S.
- Party: Democratic
- Education: Franklin and Marshall College (BA); Harvard Law School (JD)

William R. Lloyd Jr. (born October 30, 1947) is the Small Business Advocate for the State of Pennsylvania. He was a member of the Pennsylvania House of Representatives. He was the Democratic nominee for U.S. Senator against incumbent Arlen Specter in 1998.

== Background and Education ==
William R. Lloyd, Jr., was born in Somerset, Pennsylvania, on October 30, 1947. He attended Somerset Area High School, graduating in 1965. Lloyd then earned a BA from Franklin & Marshall College in Lancaster, Pa., in 1969 and a JD from Harvard Law School in 1972.

== Post-Legislative Activities ==
After serving in the Pennsylvania House, Lloyd was appointed Pennsylvania's Small Business Advocate from 2003 until 2011. The Pennsylvania Bar Association awarded William Lloyd its Christianson Award in June 2017 for his work in this role, citing his "focus on protecting the interests of small business utility customers".

Pennsylvania House of Representatives
Preceded by Kenneth Halverson	Member of the Pennsylvania House of Representatives for the 69th District; 1981–1998	Succeeded by Bob Bastian
Party political offices
Preceded by Lynn Yeakel	Democratic nominee for U.S. Senator from Pennsylvania (Class 3); 1998	Succeeded by Joe Hoeffel
