= 1998 United States Senate election in Pennsylvania =

- November 3, 1998
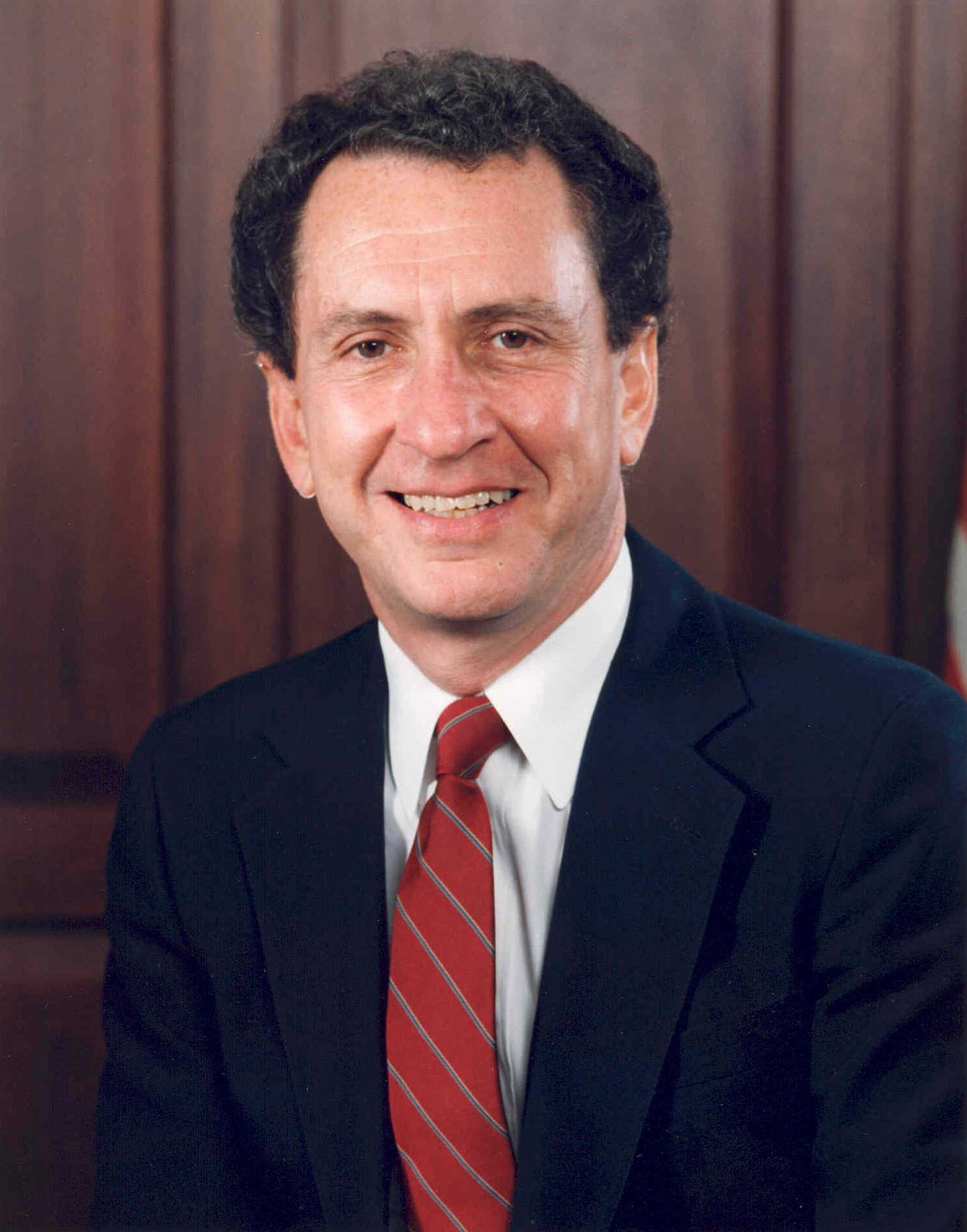

Nominee	Arlen Specter	William R. Lloyd Jr.
Party	Republican	Democratic
Popular vote	1,814,180	1,028,839
Percentage	61.34%	34.79%
- Specter: 40–50% 50–60% 60–70% 70–80% 80–90% >90% Lloyd: 40–50% 50–60% 60–70% 70–80% 80–90% >90% Tie: 30–40% 40–50% No data
U.S. senator before election
Arlen Specter
Republican
Elected U.S. Senator
Arlen Specter
Republican

The 1998 United States Senate election in Pennsylvania was held November 3, 1998. Incumbent Republican U.S. Senator Arlen Specter won re-election to a fourth term.

Primary elections were held on May 19, 1998. In the Republican primary, Specter defeated minor challengers from his right. Lloyd won the Democratic primary with a plurality of the vote over Richard J. Cusick and Richard J. Orloski.

== Republican primary ==
=== Candidates ===
==== Nominee ====
- Arlen Specter, incumbent U.S. Senator (1981–present)

==== Defeated in primary ====
- Tom Lingenfelter
- Larry Murphy

=== Results ===
Results by county Specter: 50%–60%; 60%–70%; 70%–80%

Republican primary results
Party	Candidate	Votes	%
Republican	Arlen Specter (incumbent)	376,322	67.21
Republican	Larry Murphy	101,120	18.06
Republican	Tom Lingenfelter	82,168	14.67
Write-in		328	0.06
Total votes		559,938	100.00

== Democratic primary ==
=== Candidates ===
- Richard J. Cusick, Salisbury Township physician
- William R. Lloyd Jr., state representative from Somerset since 1981
- Richard J. Orloski, Allentown attorney and perennial candidate

==== Withdrew ====
- Harry Liller, Pittsburgh activist

=== Results ===
Results by county Lloyd: 30%–40%; 40%–50%; 50%–60%; 60%–70%; 70%–80%; 80%–90%; 90%–100%; Orloski: 30%–40%; 40%–50%; 50%–60%; 70%–80%

Democratic primary results
Party	Candidate	Votes	%
Democratic	William R. Lloyd Jr.	236,435	49.53
Democratic	Richard J. Orloski	121,669	25.49
Democratic	Richard J. Cusick	118,684	24.86
Write-in		571	0.12
Total votes		477,359	100.00

== General election ==
=== Candidates ===
- Jack Iannantuono (Libertarian)
- William R. Lloyd Jr., state representative from Somerset (Democratic)
- Dean Snyder (Constitution)
- Arlen Specter, incumbent U.S. senator since 1981 (Republican)

=== Campaign ===
Leading up to this campaign, the state Democratic Party faced difficulty, as it was plagued by prior corruption allegations of several key legislators and by a lack of fund-raising. Just as in the accompanying gubernatorial race, the party had difficulty in finding a credible candidate. State Representative Bill Lloyd, who was a well-respected party leader but who had little statewide name recognition, was considered by Democratic party leaders to be a sacrificial lamb candidate. Specter ran a straightforward campaign and attempted to avoid mistakes, while Lloyd's bid was so underfunded that he was unable to air a single commercial until two weeks before the election. Lloyd's strategy was to portray Republicans as hyper-partisan in wake of their attempt to impeach President Bill Clinton, but he was unable to gain any traction with his message. On Election Day, Specter's win was by the second-largest margin in the history of Senate elections in Pennsylvania. Lloyd won only two counties: almost uniformly Democratic Philadelphia and his home county, rural and typically Republican Somerset County. As of 2022, this is the last time Allegheny County voted for a Republican Senate candidate.

=== Polling ===
Poll source	Date(s)	Sample size (Note: Key: A – all adults RV – registered voters LV – likely voters V – unclear)	Margin of error	Arlen Specter (R)	William Lloyd Jr. (D)	Other / undecided (Note: Calculated by taking the difference of 100% and all other candidates combined.)
Harris Insights & Analytics	October 30, 1998	1,812	—	63%	32%	5%
Mason-Dixon Polling & Strategy	October 25–27, 1998	807 (LV)	± 3.5%	57%	34%	9%
Millersville University	October 25, 1998	481	—	61%	17%	22%
Harris Insights & Analytics	October 20, 1998	1,611	—	57%	25%	18%
Mason-Dixon Polling & Strategy	October 3–6, 1998	801 (LV)	± 3.5%	55%	31%	14%
Millersville University (Note: Poll sponsored by KYW-TV3, the Philadelphia Daily News, & the Harrisburg Patriot)	September 25–29, 1998	629 (A)	± 4.6%	52%	27%	11%
Mason-Dixon Polling & Strategy	September 14–16, 1998	806 (LV)	± 3.5%	58%	27%	15%
Mason-Dixon Polling & Strategy	August 2–4, 1998	806 (LV)	± 3.5%	57%	25%	18%
Millersville University	July 8–28, 1998	451 (RV)	± 4.6%	56%	26%	18%

=== Results ===
1998 U.S. Senate election in Pennsylvania
Party	Candidate	Votes	%	±%
Republican	Arlen Specter (incumbent)	1,814,180	61.34%	▲12.24
Democratic	William R. Lloyd Jr.	1,028,839	34.79%	▼11.54
Constitution	Dean Snyder	68,377	2.31%	N/A
Libertarian	Jack Iannantuono	46,103	1.56%	▼3.01
Total votes		2,957,499	100.00%	
Republican hold				

== See also ==
- 1998 United States Senate elections

== Notes ==
Partisan clients
