= Carl Walker Metzgar =

American politician from Pennsylvania

Member of the Pennsylvania House of Representatives from the 69th district
- Incumbent
- Assumed office January 6, 2009
- Preceded by: Bob Bastian

Personal details
- Born: October 1, 1981 (age 44) Somerset, Pennsylvania, U.S.
- Party: Republican

Carl Walker Metzgar (born October 1, 1981) was first elected to serve the Pennsylvania 69th Legislative District in November 2008.

== Career ==
In addition to serving as a state representative in the Pennsylvania House of Representatives, Metzgar is an attorney in Somerset and Bedford counties. He is a member of the Somerset County and the Pennsylvania Bar Associations. Metzgar currently sits on the Committee On Ethics, Consumer Affairs, and Liquor Control committees.

== Personal ==
Metzgar was born and raised in Somerset County and spent much of his childhood raising cattle and helping his family on their farm. He graduated from Berlin Brothersvalley High School in 2000. He graduated from Frostburg State University with bachelor's degrees in political science and criminal justice. Metzgar went on to Duquesne University's School of Law, where he received the Judge Manning Award for highest achievement in trial advocacy.
