= Fort Hill, Pennsylvania =

Unincorporated community in Pennsylvania, US

- Unincorporated community
- Location within Pennsylvania
- Coordinates: 39°49′49″N 79°16′21″W
- Country: United States
- State: Pennsylvania
- County: Somerset
- Township: Upper Turkeyfoot Township
- Elevation: 1,585 ft (483 m)
- Time zone: UTC-5 (Eastern (EST))
  - Summer (DST): UTC-4 (EDT)
- ZIP code: 15540
- Area code: 814
- GNIS feature ID: 1175007

Fort Hill is an unincorporated community in Upper Turkeyfoot Township, Somerset County, Pennsylvania, United States. The community is located along the Casselman River bordering Addison Township, 4.6 miles (7.4 km) east-northeast of Confluence. Fort Hill has a post office, with ZIP code 15540, which opened on December 23, 1885.

Fort Hill was the location of a Monongahela Native American settlement, which a 1939-1940 WPA excavation directed by Edgar Augustine dated to circa 1275-1300.

Fort Hill sits along the old Baltimore and Ohio Railroad main line; a view of the natural landmark appeared in a collection of photographs from along the B&O's lines that was published in book form in 1872 and digitized by the DeGolyer Library, Southern Methodist University.

Fort Hill has a trail access area for the Great Allegheny Passage rail trail. This is the only trail access area with parking between Markleton to the northeast and Harnedsville to the southwest.
