= Bob Bastian =

American politician (1938–2019)

Member of the Pennsylvania House of Representatives from the 69th district
- In office January 5, 1999 – November 30, 2008
- Preceded by: William R. Lloyd, Jr.
- Succeeded by: Carl Walker Metzgar

Personal details
- Born: October 21, 1938 Williamsport, Pennsylvania, U.S.
- Died: July 13, 2019 (aged 80) Johnstown, Pennsylvania, U.S.
- Party: Republican
- Spouse: Susie Bastian
- Children: 5
- Education: Cornell University; Penn State University
- Occupation: Veterinarian
- Website: www.bobbastian.com

Military service
- Branch/service: United States Air Force
- Years of service: 1966–1968
- Rank: Captain

William Robert Bastian (October 21, 1938 – July 13, 2019) was a Republican member of the Pennsylvania House of Representatives, representing the 69th District.

== Biography ==
Bastian and his wife lived in Friedens, Pennsylvania, and had five children. He retired prior to the 2008 election, having joined in 1999, and was succeeded by Republican Carl Walker Metzgar.

On July 11, 2019, Bastian was accidentally crushed by a rolling tractor's wheel on his farm. He died on July 13 at Conemaugh Memorial Medical Center in Johnstown, Pennsylvania.

Pennsylvania House of Representatives
Preceded by William R. Lloyd Jr.	Member of the Pennsylvania House of Representatives for the 69th District; 1999–2008	Succeeded by Carl Walker Metzgar
