= Turkeyfoot Valley Area Junior/Senior High School =

Coordinates: 39.79922°N 79.32903°W

Location
- 172 Turkeyfoot Road; Lower Turkeyfoot Township, Somerset County, Pennsylvania; Confluence, Pennsylvania 15424

Information
- School type: Public Junior/Senior High School
- Established: 1950
- School district: Turkeyfoot Valley Area School District
- NCES District ID: 4223880
- Superintendent: Jeffrey Malspino
- NCES School ID: 422388006216
- Principal: Nicole Dice
- Teaching staff: 9.91 (FTE)
- Grades: 7-12
- Enrollment: 123 (2023-2024)
- Student to teacher ratio: 12.41
- Colors: Navy Blue and Gold
- Athletics conference: Pennsylvania Interscholastic Athletic Association District V, Blue and Gold Conference (Football)
- Mascot: Rams
- Newspaper: The Gobbler
- Yearbook: Turkeyougha
- Communities served: Addison, Confluence, and Ursina
- Feeder schools: Turkeyfoot Valley Elementary School

Turkeyfoot Valley Area Junior/Senior High School is one of two schools that are in the same building, which make up the Turkeyfoot Valley Area School District. The campus is located two miles south of Confluence on State Route 523 in the Lower Turkeyfoot Township community of Harnedsville.

== History ==
Students moved into for the building in the fall of 1955, and it was dedicated in 1956 under Supervising Principal Howard Trexel. It was constructed of concrete, brick and steel and cost $658,584.22 to construct. The high school, along with the elementary annex was renovated in 1996.

== Vocational education ==
Students in grades 10-12 who wish to pursue training in a specific career path or field may attend the Somerset County Technology Center in Somerset Township.

== Athletics and extracurricular activities ==
=== Athletics ===
The school participates in the Pennsylvania Interscholastic Athletic Association District V for Pennsylvania-related athletic activity. The school joined the Blue and Grey Football Conference in the 1980s, competing with schools of their size in Maryland and West Virginia.

Pennsylvania Interscholastic Athletic Association-sanctioned sports are as follows:

Sport	Boys/Class	Girls/Class
Baseball	Class A	
Basketball	Class A	Class A
Rifle	Class AAAA	Class AAAA
Softball		Class A

==== Notable Championships ====
Turkeyfoot has the following championships under their belt in their 60+ year history:

- Somerset County Football Champions: 1972, 1984
- Somerset County Softball Champions: 1979, 1980
- Somerset County Boys Basketball Champions: 1983-84, 1988–89
- Pennsylvania Interscholastic Athletic Association District V Boys Basketball Champions: 1983-84

=== Extracurricular Clubs ===
The following clubs are available to students:

- Band
- Campus ministries
- Future Farmers of America
- Journalism
- National Honor Society
- S.A.D.D.
- Student Council
- Webpage
