= Boynton, Pennsylvania =

Unincorporated community in Pennsylvania, US

- Unincorporated community
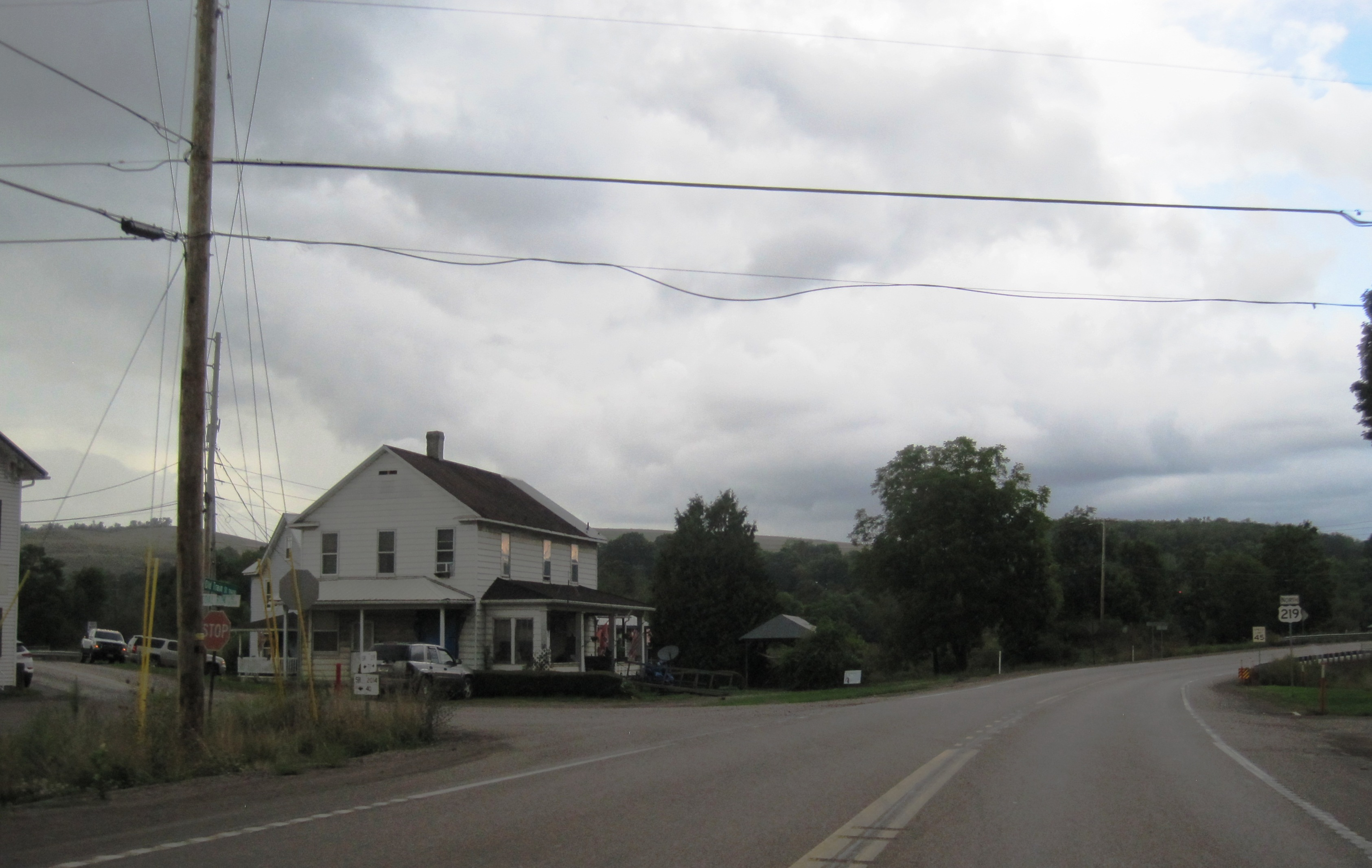
- Boynton along US 219 northbound

- Location within Pennsylvania
- Coordinates: 39°46′00″N 79°04′00″W
- Country: United States
- State: Pennsylvania
- County: Somerset
- Elevation: 1,985 ft (605 m)
- Time zone: UTC-5 (Eastern (EST))
  - Summer (DST): UTC-4 (EDT)
- ZIP code: 15532
- Area code: 814
- GNIS feature ID: 1170105

Boynton is an unincorporated community in Somerset County, Pennsylvania, United States. The community is located along the Casselman River and U.S. Route 219, 1.2 miles (1.9 km) north-northeast of Salisbury. Boynton has a post office, with ZIP code 15532.
