= Penrose Wolf Building =

- U.S. National Register of Historic Places
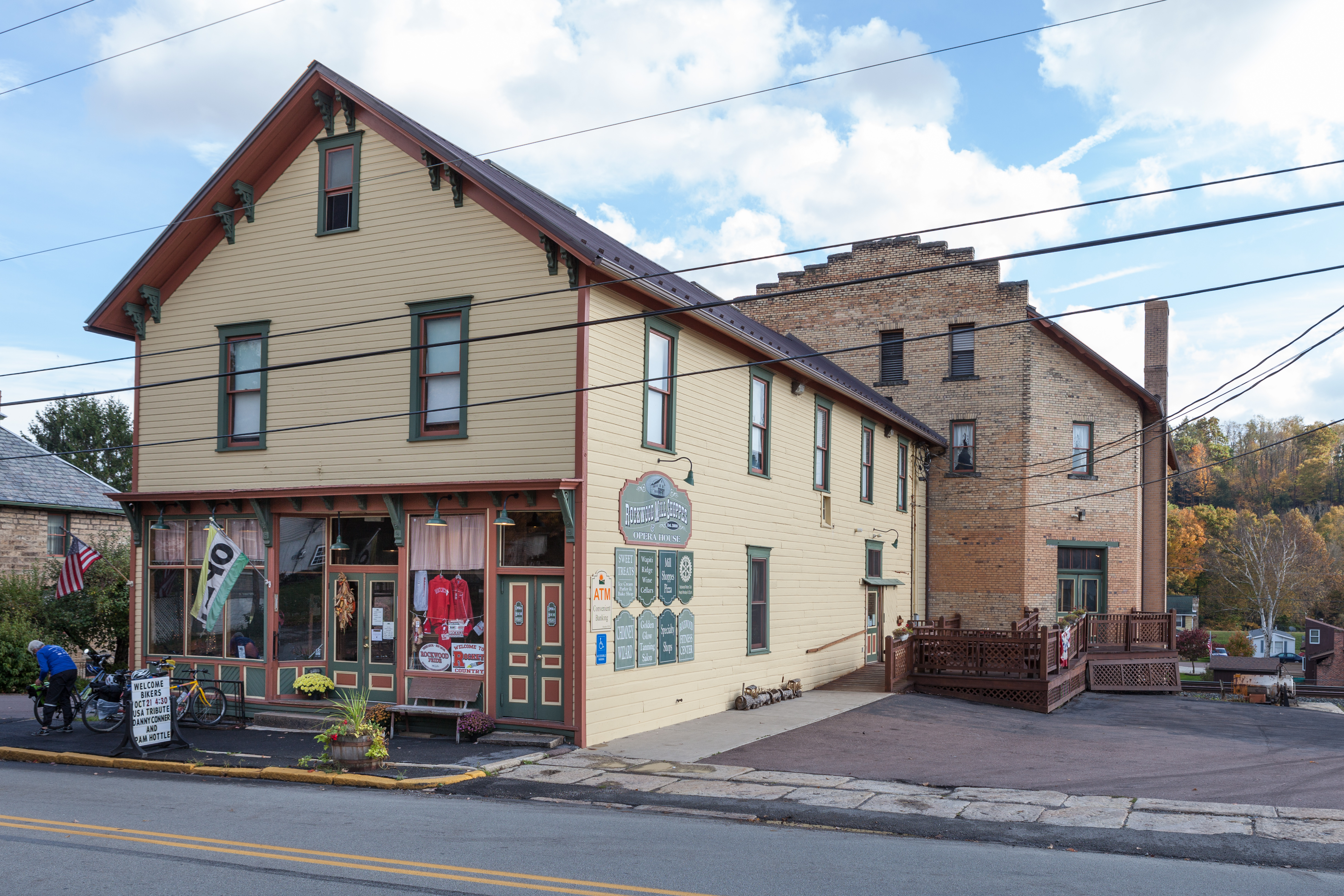
- North and west sides in October 2014

- Location within Pennsylvania Location within the United States
- Location: 450 Main St., Rockwood, Pennsylvania
- Coordinates: 39°54′50″N 79°9′28″W
- Area: less than one acre
- Built: 1898, 1905
- Architectural style: Late Victorian
- NRHP reference No.: 02000967
- Added to NRHP: September 13, 2002

The Penrose Wolf Building, also known as the Rockwood Opera House, is an historic commercial building that is located in Rockwood, Somerset County, Pennsylvania, United States.

It was added to the National Register of Historic Places in 2002.

== History and architectural features ==
The front section of this historic building was erected in 1898, and is a two-story, wood-frame structure that measures thirty feet by sixty feet. The rear section was added in 1905, and is a three-story, yellow brick structure that measures fifty feet by seventy-five feet.

During the early twentieth century, the upper floor of the wood frame section housed "the Opera House." The rear section was designed for heavy commercial use and housed a grain and lumber storage facility. In 2000, the building was purchased by Judith Pletcher and restored to working order. It currently houses shops, restaurants and live entertainment in the Opera House.
