= Black Township, Pennsylvania =

Township in Pennsylvania, US

Coordinates: 39°52′00″N 79°09′59″W

Black Township, Somerset County, Pennsylvania
- Township
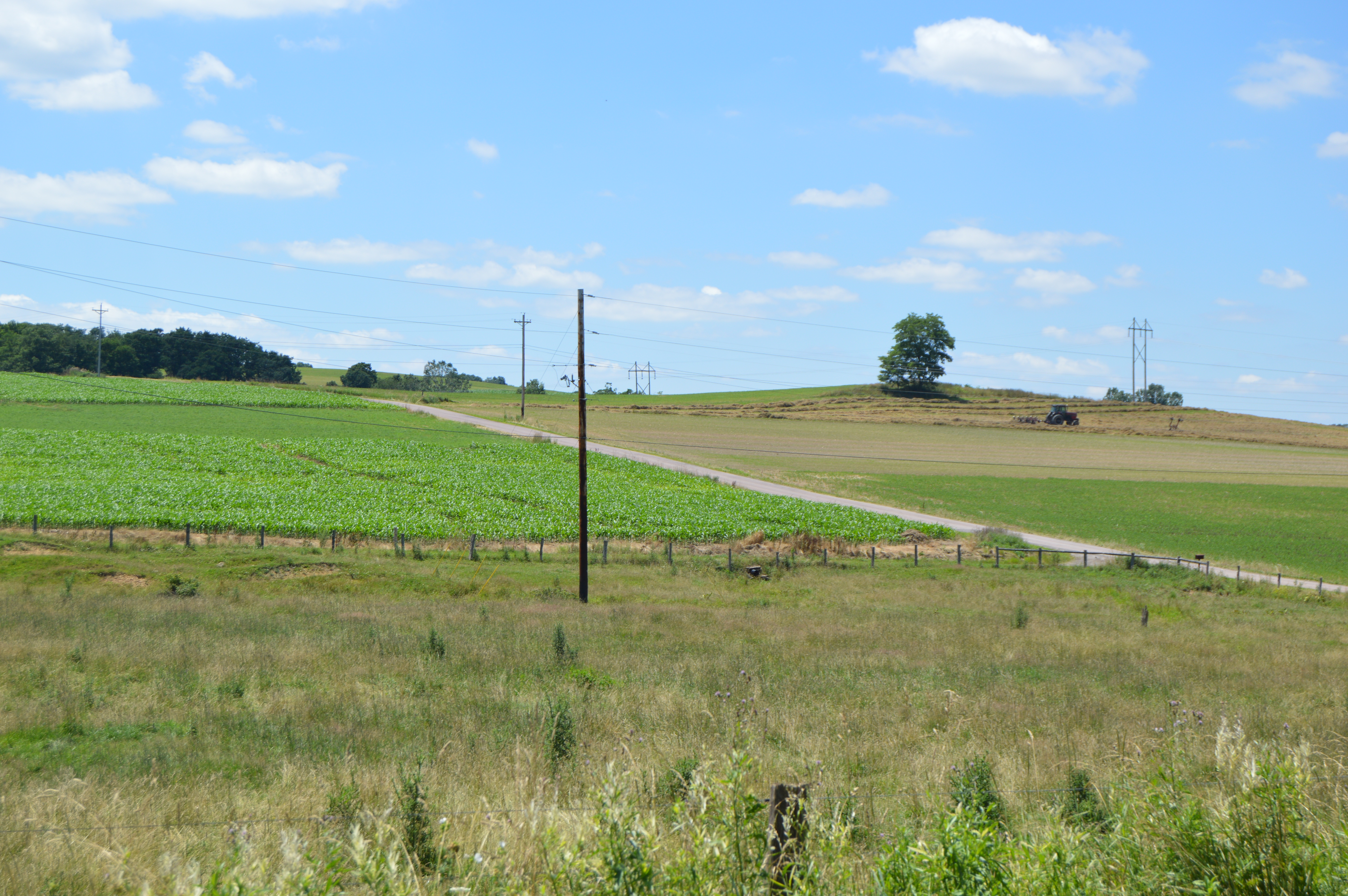
- Agricultural scene south of Rockwood

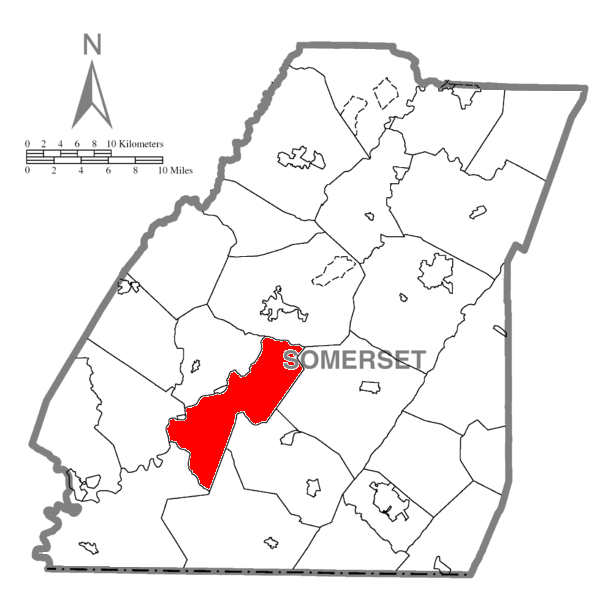
- Map of Somerset County, Pennsylvania Highlighting Black Township

- Map of Somerset County, Pennsylvania
- Country: United States
- State: Pennsylvania
- County: Somerset
- Settled: 1774
- Incorporated: 1886

Area
  - Total: 42.73 sq mi (110.66 km^{2})
  - Land: 42.71 sq mi (110.63 km^{2})
  - Water: 0.015 sq mi (0.04 km^{2})

Population (2020)
  - Total: 900 ▼
  - Estimate (2022): 895
  - Density: 20.7/sq mi (8.01/km^{2})
- Time zone: UTC-5 (Eastern (EST))
  - Summer (DST): UTC-4 (EDT)
- FIPS code: 42-111-06640

Black Township is a township in Somerset County, Pennsylvania, United States. The population was 899 at the 2020 census. It is part of the Johnstown, Pennsylvania, Metropolitan Statistical Area. The township was named for Jeremiah Sullivan Black, a native of Somerset County who became Chief Justice of the Supreme Court of Pennsylvania, U.S. Attorney General, and U.S Secretary of State.

== Geography ==
According to the United States Census Bureau, the township has a total area of 42.5 square miles (110 km^{2}), of which 42.5 square miles (110 km^{2}) is land and 0.02% is water. Black Township is bordered by Somerset Township to the north, Brothersvalley & Summit Townships to the east, Elk Lick Township to the southeast, Addison Township to the southwest, and Upper Turkeyfoot & Milford Townships to the west.

Pennsylvania Route 653 passes through Black Township, generally running southeastward from the borough of Rockwood and Milford Township, through Black Township, and into Summit Township on its way to the borough of Garrett. Rockwood sits at the confluence of Coxes Creek and the Casselman River, between Milford Township to the northwest and Black Township to the southeast. Black Township had been part of Milford Township until it was split off in 1886.

== Demographics ==
Historical population
Census	Pop.	Note	%±
2010	926		—
2020	900		−2.8%
2022 (est.)	895		−0.6%
U.S. Decennial Census

At the 2000 census there were 980 people, 364 households, and 281 families living in the township. The population density was 23.0 people per square mile (8.9/km^{2}). There were 400 housing units at an average density of 9.4/sq mi (3.6/km^{2}). The racial makeup of the township was 99.08% White, 0.61% African American, 0.10% Native American, and 0.20% from two or more races. Of the 364 households 35.4% had children under the age of 18 living with them, 67.0% were married couples living together, 6.3% had a female householder with no husband present, and 22.8% were non-families. 20.9% of households were one person and 12.9% were one person aged 65 or older. The average household size was 2.69 and the average family size was 3.12.

The age distribution was 26.3% under the age of 18, 6.9% from 18 to 24, 28.8% from 25 to 44, 23.5% from 45 to 64, and 14.5% 65 or older. The median age was 37 years. For every 100 females, there were 101.6 males. For every 100 females age 18 and over, there were 95.1 males.

The median household income was $28,958 and the median family income was $36,125. Males had a median income of $27,321 versus $21,382 for females. The per capita income for the township was $13,504. About 13.2% of families and 16.9% of the population were below the poverty line, including 24.9% of those under age 18 and 19.9% of those age 65 or over.
