= West Salisbury, Pennsylvania =

Unincorporated community in Pennsylvania, US

- Unincorporated community
- Location within Pennsylvania
- Coordinates: 39°45′15″N 79°05′42″W
- Country: United States
- State: Pennsylvania
- County: Somerset
- Elevation: 2,005 ft (611 m)
- Time zone: UTC-5 (Eastern (EST))
  - Summer (DST): UTC-4 (EDT)
- ZIP code: 15565
- Area code: 814
- GNIS feature ID: 1191106

West Salisbury is an unincorporated community in Somerset County, Pennsylvania, United States. The community is located along Pennsylvania Route 669 on the western border of Salisbury. West Salisbury had a post office from March 10, 1900, until July 23, 2011; it still has its own ZIP code, 15565.
