= Milford Township, Somerset County, Pennsylvania =

Township in Pennsylvania, US

Coordinates: 40°00′06″N 79°10′29″W

- Township
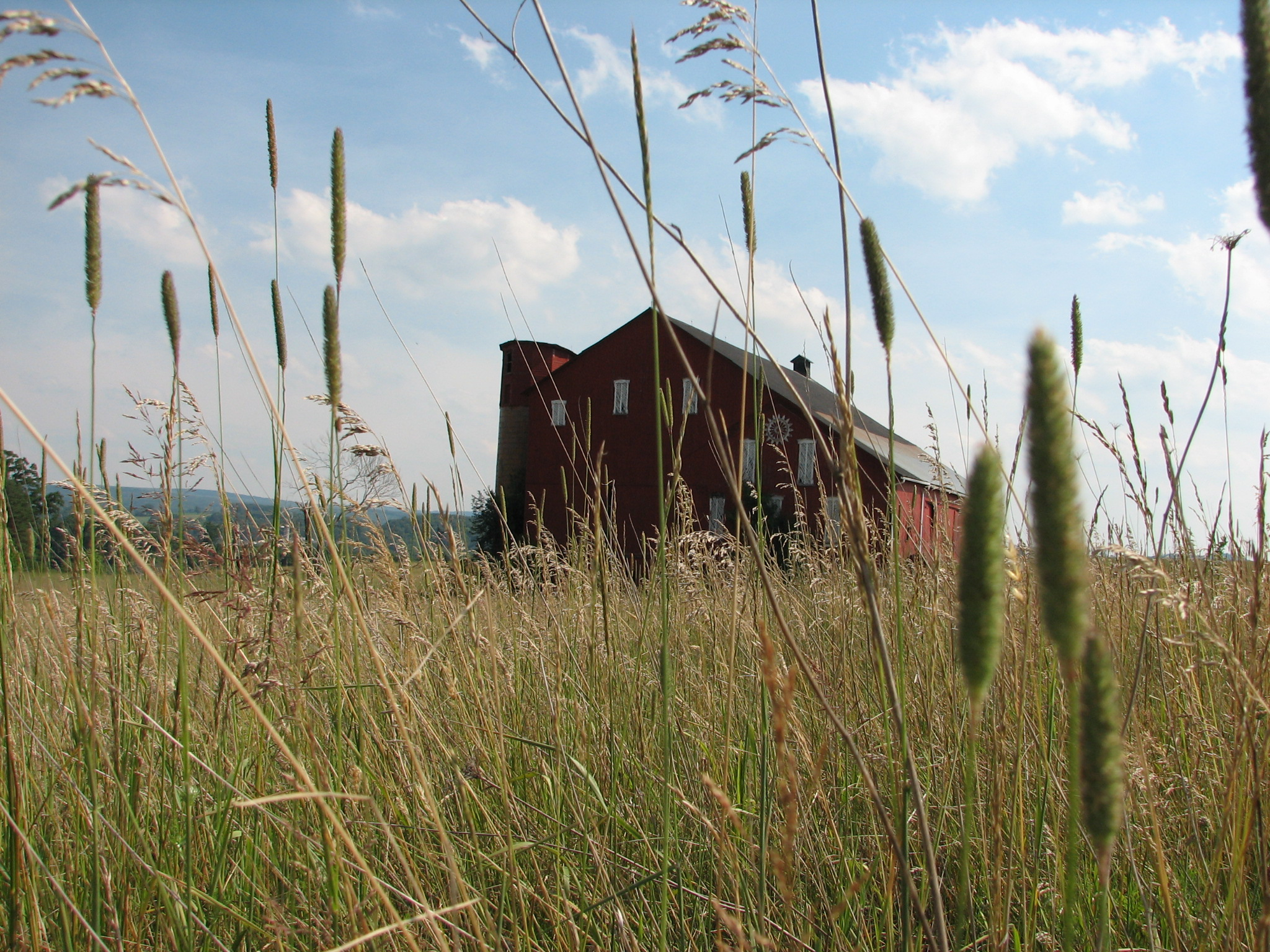
- A farm in Milford Township

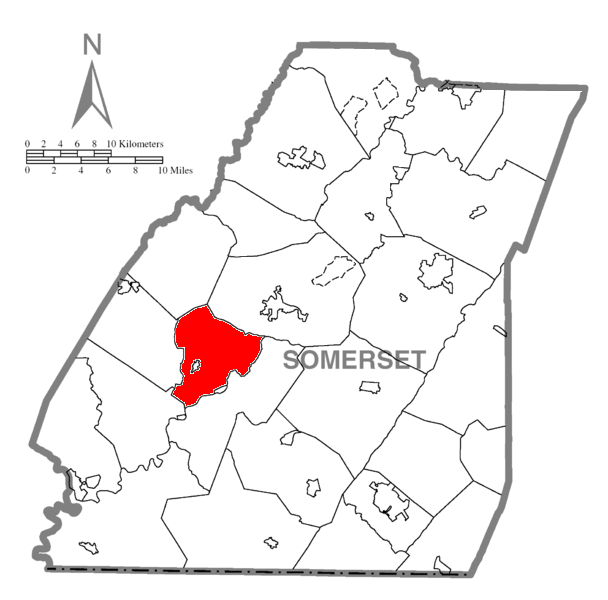
- Map of Somerset County, Pennsylvania Highlighting Milford Township

- Map of Somerset County, Pennsylvania
- Country: United States
- State: Pennsylvania
- County: Somerset
- Organized: 1780

Area
  - Total: 29.75 sq mi (77.06 km^{2})
  - Land: 29.75 sq mi (77.05 km^{2})
  - Water: 0.0039 sq mi (0.01 km^{2})

Population (2020)
  - Total: 1,488 ▼
  - Estimate (2021): 1,483
  - Density: 51.0/sq mi (19.68/km^{2})
- Time zone: UTC-5 (Eastern (EST))
  - Summer (DST): UTC-4 (EDT)
- FIPS code: 42-111-49416

Milford Township is a township in Somerset County, Pennsylvania, United States. The population was 1,488 at the 2020 census. It is part of the Johnstown, Pennsylvania, Metropolitan Statistical Area.

== History ==
Milford Township was formed from part of Turkeyfoot Township about 1780, when both were still part of a larger Bedford County; Somerset County was not formed from the western portion of Bedford County until April 17, 1795. Neither the exact time nor its original boundaries are known. The original Milford Township included those parts of Somerset and Jefferson townships that lie south of the old Glades road, or the pike, until 1796, and also Middlecreek Township which was separated in 1853 and Black Township which was separated in 1886, whence Milford Township took its current outlines.

== Geography ==
According to the United States Census Bureau, Milford Township has a total area of 29.2 square miles (75.8 km^{2}), of which 29.2 square miles (75.8 km^{2}) is land and 0.03% is water. The township surrounds the borough of New Centerville. Milford Township is bordered by Jefferson Township to the northwest, Somerset Township to the northeast, Black Township to the southeast, Upper Turkeyfoot Township to the southwest, and Middlecreek Township to the west.

Pennsylvania Route 281 passes through Milford Township, generally running northeast from New Lexington in Middlecreek Township, passing through New Centerville and bisecting Milford Township, and continuing through the southwestern part of Somerset Township on its way to the borough of Somerset. From New Lexington to New Centerville, Pennsylvania Route 281 & Pennsylvania Route 653 form a concurrency; in New Centerville, Pennsylvania Route 653 splits off and runs southeast to the borough of Rockwood. Rockwood sits at the confluence of Coxes Creek and the Casselman River, between Milford Township to the northwest and Black Township to the southeast. Black Township had been part of Milford Township until it was split off in 1886.

== Demographics ==
Historical population
Census	Pop.	Note	%±
2010	1,553		—
2020	1,488		−4.2%
2021 (est.)	1,483		−0.3%
U.S. Decennial Census

At the 2000 census there were 1,561 people, 602 households, and 473 families living in the township. The population density was 53.4 inhabitants per square mile (20.6/km^{2}). There were 658 housing units at an average density of 22.5/sq mi (8.7/km^{2}). The racial makeup of the township was 99.81% White, 0.06% African American, 0.06% Asian, and 0.06% from two or more races. Hispanic or Latino of any race were 0.19%.

Of the 602 households 30.2% had children under the age of 18 living with them, 69.6% were married couples living together, 5.1% had a female householder with no husband present, and 21.4% were non-families. 18.6% of households were one person and 8.8% were one person aged 65 or older. The average household size was 2.58 and the average family size was 2.93.

The age distribution was 22.4% under the age of 18, 6.3% from 18 to 24, 28.6% from 25 to 44, 26.8% from 45 to 64, and 15.8% 65 or older. The median age was 41 years. For every 100 females, there were 98.9 males. For every 100 females age 18 and over, there were 99.8 males.

The median household income was $34,458 and the median family income was $38,750. Males had a median income of $29,038 versus $21,000 for females. The per capita income for the township was $14,836. About 11.4% of families and 14.3% of the population were below the poverty line, including 17.5% of those under age 18 and 25.0% of those age 65 or over.
