= Upper Turkeyfoot Township, Pennsylvania =

Township in Pennsylvania, US

Coordinates: 39°52′00″N 79°16′59″W

Upper Turkeyfoot Township, Somerset County, Pennsylvania
- Township
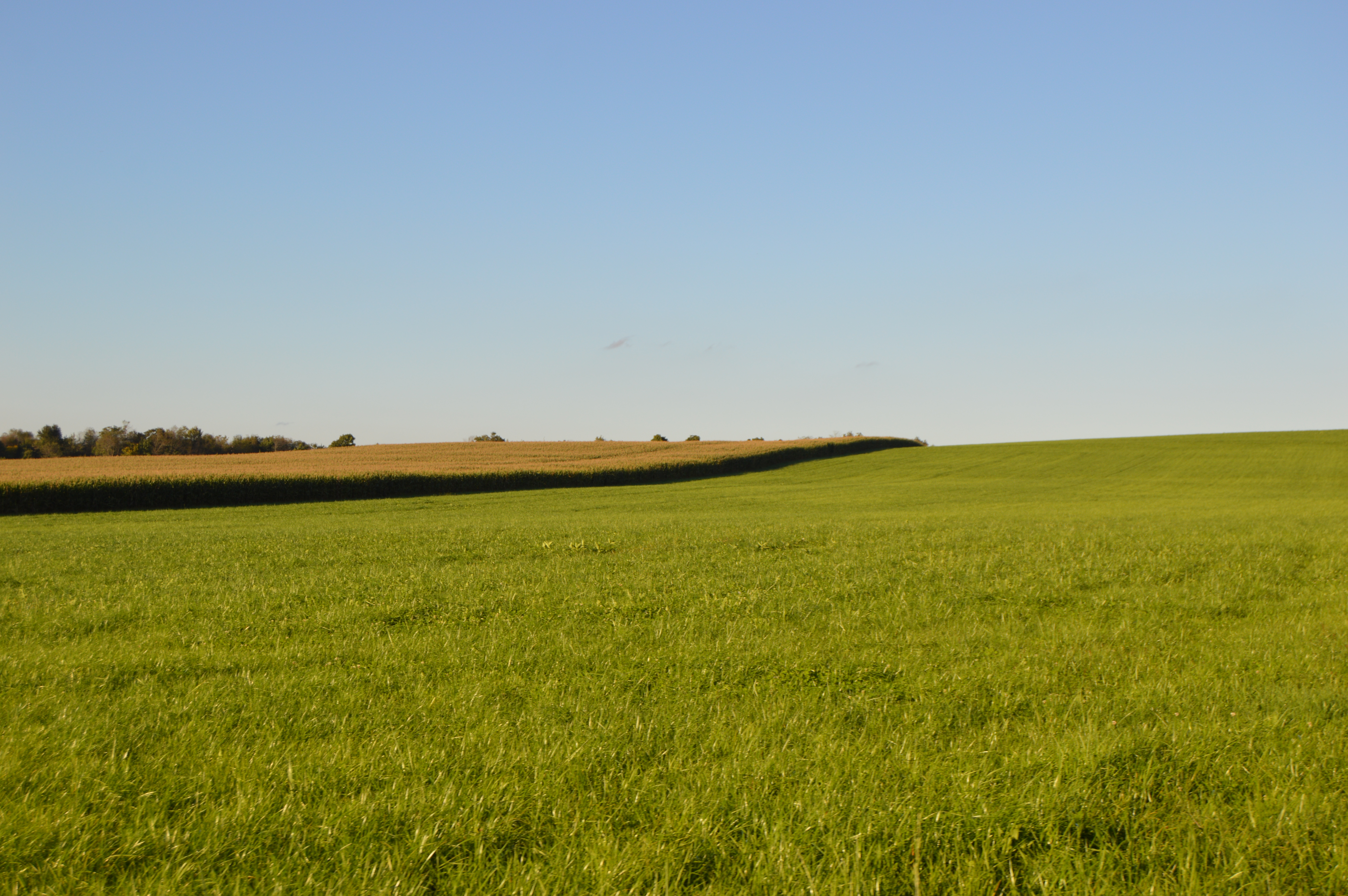
- Arable land northwest of Casselman in the township

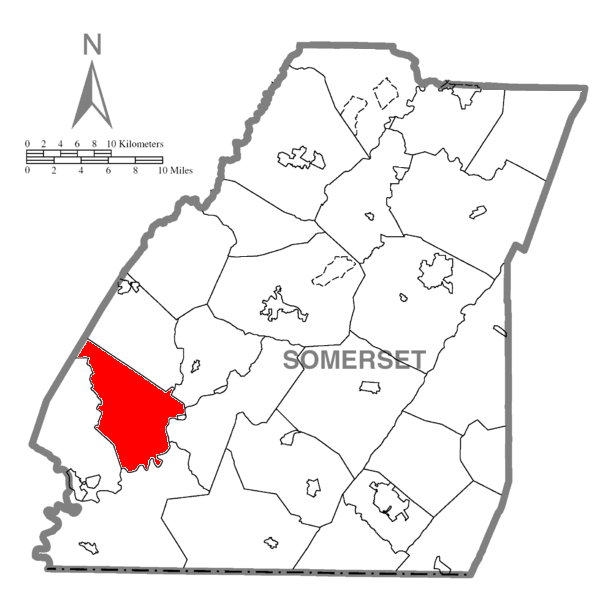
- Location of Turkeyfoot Township in Somerset County, Pennsylvania

- Map of Somerset County, Pennsylvania
- Country: United States
- State: Pennsylvania
- County: Somerset

Area
  - Total: 38.66 sq mi (100.13 km^{2})
  - Land: 38.64 sq mi (100.07 km^{2})
  - Water: 0.023 sq mi (0.06 km^{2})

Population (2020)
  - Total: 1,058
  - Estimate (2021): 1,058
  - Density: 27.7/sq mi (10.69/km^{2})
- Time zone: UTC-5 (Eastern (EST))
  - Summer (DST): UTC-4 (EDT)
- FIPS code: 42-111-79336

Upper Turkeyfoot Township is a township in Somerset County, Pennsylvania, United States. The population was 1,063 at the 2020 census. It is part of the Johnstown, Pennsylvania metropolitan statistical area.

== History ==
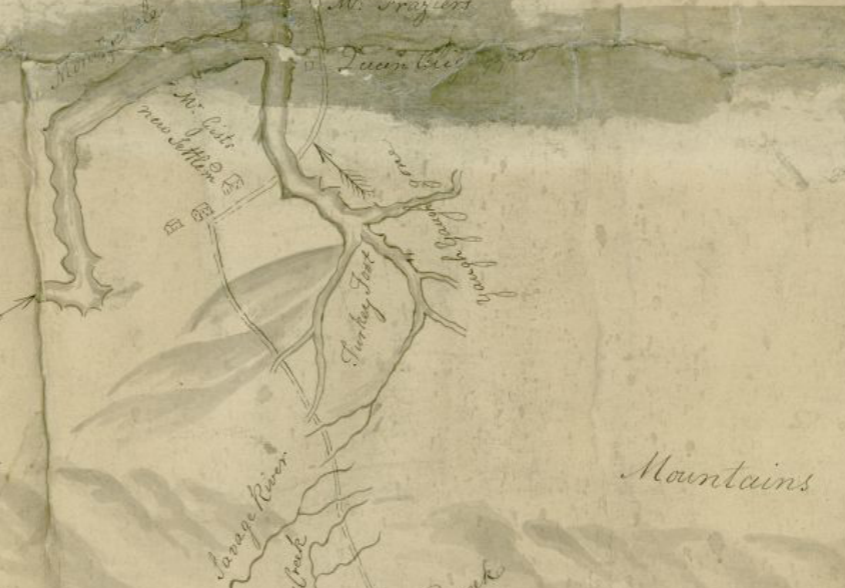
A 1754 map of the Turkeyfoot region drawn by George Washington

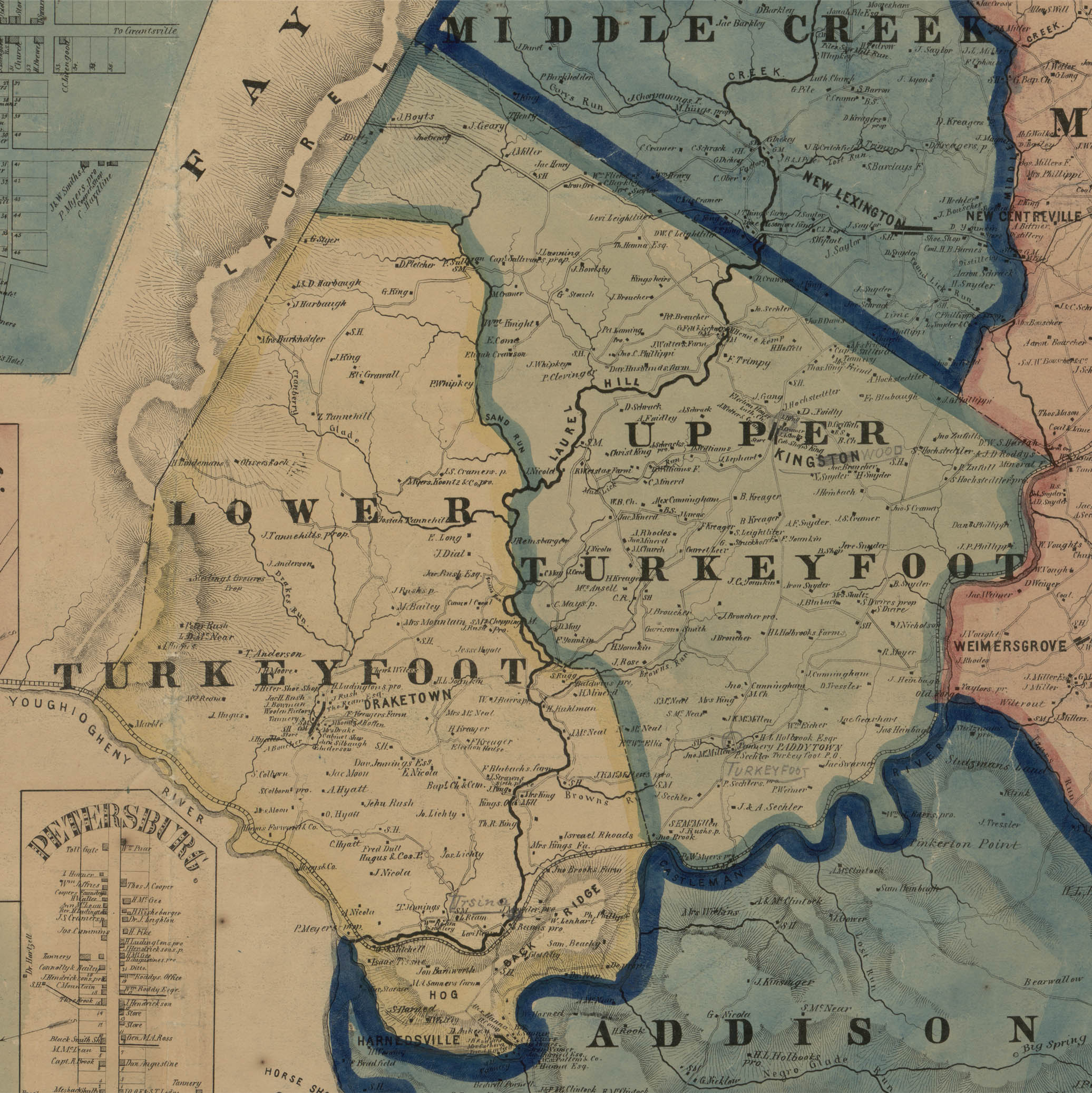
Upper and Lower Turkeyfoot Townships in Somerset County, Pennsylvania in 1860

Turkeyfoot Township was formed from part of Brothersvalley Township in 1773, when both were still part of a larger Bedford County; Somerset County was not formed from the western portion of Bedford County until 1795. Just as new counties were split off from earlier counties, new townships were split off from earlier townships, and the townships of Upper Turkeyfoot and Lower Turkeyfoot took their current shapes in 1848.

White settlers arrived in the Turkeyfoot area by the late 1760s, and a group of about 15-20 Baptist families came to the area from New Jersey circa 1774. John Drury had a school near Kingwood in 1812, and William Kilpatrick taught at a private home in Paddytown in 1815.

== Geography ==
According to the U.S. Census Bureau, the township has a total area of 38.8 square miles (100 km^{2}), 38.7 square miles (100 km^{2}) of which is land and 0.04 square miles (0.10 km^{2}) (0.08%) of which is water. Upper Turkeyfoot Township is bordered by Lower Turkeyfoot Township & Fayette County to the west, Middlecreek & Milford Townships to the northeast, and Black and Addison townships to the southeast. The borough of Casselman sits on the far eastern tip of the township, along the bank of the Casselman River.

Pennsylvania Route 281 passes diagonally through the township, generally heading northeast from Confluence and Ursina, through the southern end of Lower Turkeyfoot Township, through Upper Turkeyfoot Township, and into the southern end of Middlecreek Township on its way to New Lexington. The unincorporated community of Markleton is located east of PA Route 281, on the Casselman River which flows along the southeastern edge of Upper Turkeyfoot Township.

Laurel Hill Creek flows through Upper Turkeyfoot Township, with tributaries such as Green King Run / Whipkey Run, Mud Lick Run / Mose King Run, and Sandy Run joining its stream before it enters Lower Turkeyfoot Township.

== Demographics ==
Historical population
| Census | Pop. | Note | %± |
|---|---|---|---|
| 2010 | 1,119 | | — |
| 2020 | 1,063 | | −5.0% |
| 2021 (est.) | 1,058 | | −0.5% |
U.S. Decennial Census

As of the census of 2000, there were 1,232 people, 450 households, and 369 families residing in the township. The population density was 31.8 people per square mile (12.3 people/km^{2}). There were 663 housing units at an average density of 17.1 per square mile (6.6/km^{2}). The racial makeup of the township was 99.35% White, 0.08% African American, 0.16% Native American, 0.08% Asian, 0.08% from other races, and 0.24% from two or more races. Hispanic or Latino of any race were 0.08% of the population.

There were 450 households, out of which 37.1% had children under the age of 18 living with them, 74.4% were married couples living together, 4.0% had a female householder with no husband present, and 17.8% were non-families. 14.9% of all households were made up of individuals, and 7.8% had someone living alone who was 65 years of age or older. The average household size was 2.72 and the average family size was 3.01.

In the township the population was spread out, with 26.4% under the age of 18, 5.4% from 18 to 24, 28.7% from 25 to 44, 26.5% from 45 to 64, and 13.1% who were 65 years of age or older. The median age was 38 years. For every 100 females, there were 104.7 males. For every 100 females age 18 and over, there were 102.9 males.

The median income for a household in the township was $33,077, and the median income for a family was $35,380. Males had a median income of $26,639 versus $21,731 for females. The per capita income for the township was $14,137. About 6.3% of families and 9.7% of the population were below the poverty line, including 12.2% of those under age 18 and 12.3% of those age 65 or over.
