= Casselman, Pennsylvania =

Borough in Pennsylvania, US

- Borough
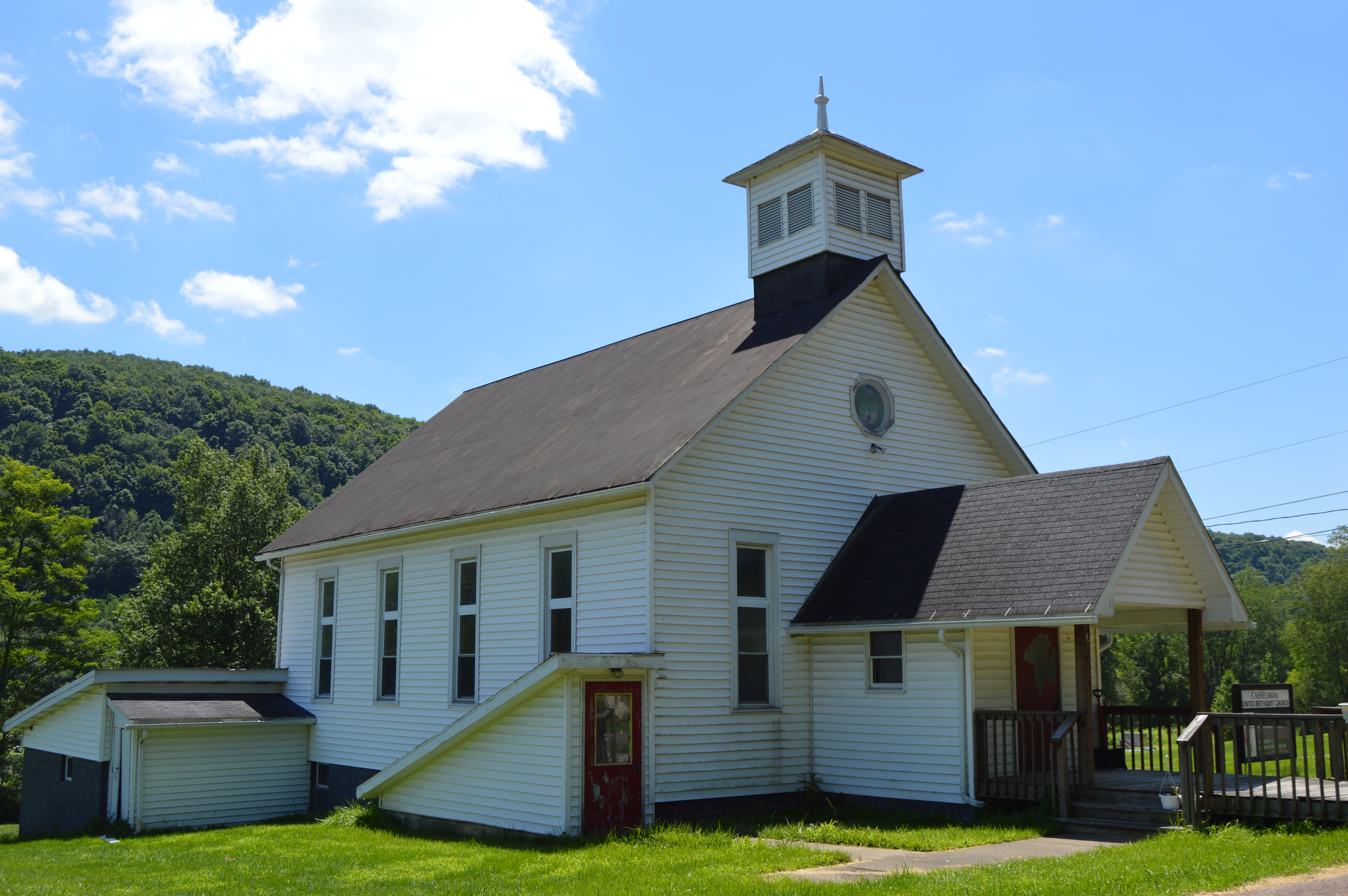
- Methodist church on St. John Street

- Location of Casselman in Somerset County, Pennsylvania.
- Coordinates: 39°53′09″N 79°12′33″W
- Country: United States
- State: Pennsylvania
- County: Somerset
- Settled: 1869
- Incorporated: 1891

Government
  - Type: Borough Council

Area
  - Total: 0.20 sq mi (0.52 km^{2})
  - Land: 0.20 sq mi (0.52 km^{2})
  - Water: 0 sq mi (0.00 km^{2})

Population (2020)
  - Total: 104
  - Density: 517.3/sq mi (199.72/km^{2})
- Time zone: UTC-5 (Eastern (EST))
  - Summer (DST): UTC-4 (EDT)
- Area code: 814
- FIPS code: 42-11624

Casselman is a borough in Somerset County, Pennsylvania, United States. As of the 2020 census, Casselman had a population of 104.

== Population ==
The population was 100 at the 2020 census. Casselman is part of the Johnstown, Pennsylvania, Metropolitan Statistical Area.

== History ==
The final section of the Baltimore & Ohio Railroad line between Pittsburgh and Cumberland was completed on the afternoon of April 10, 1871, with the final rail being laid near Forge Bridge, which became a small station just west of Casselman.

== Geography ==
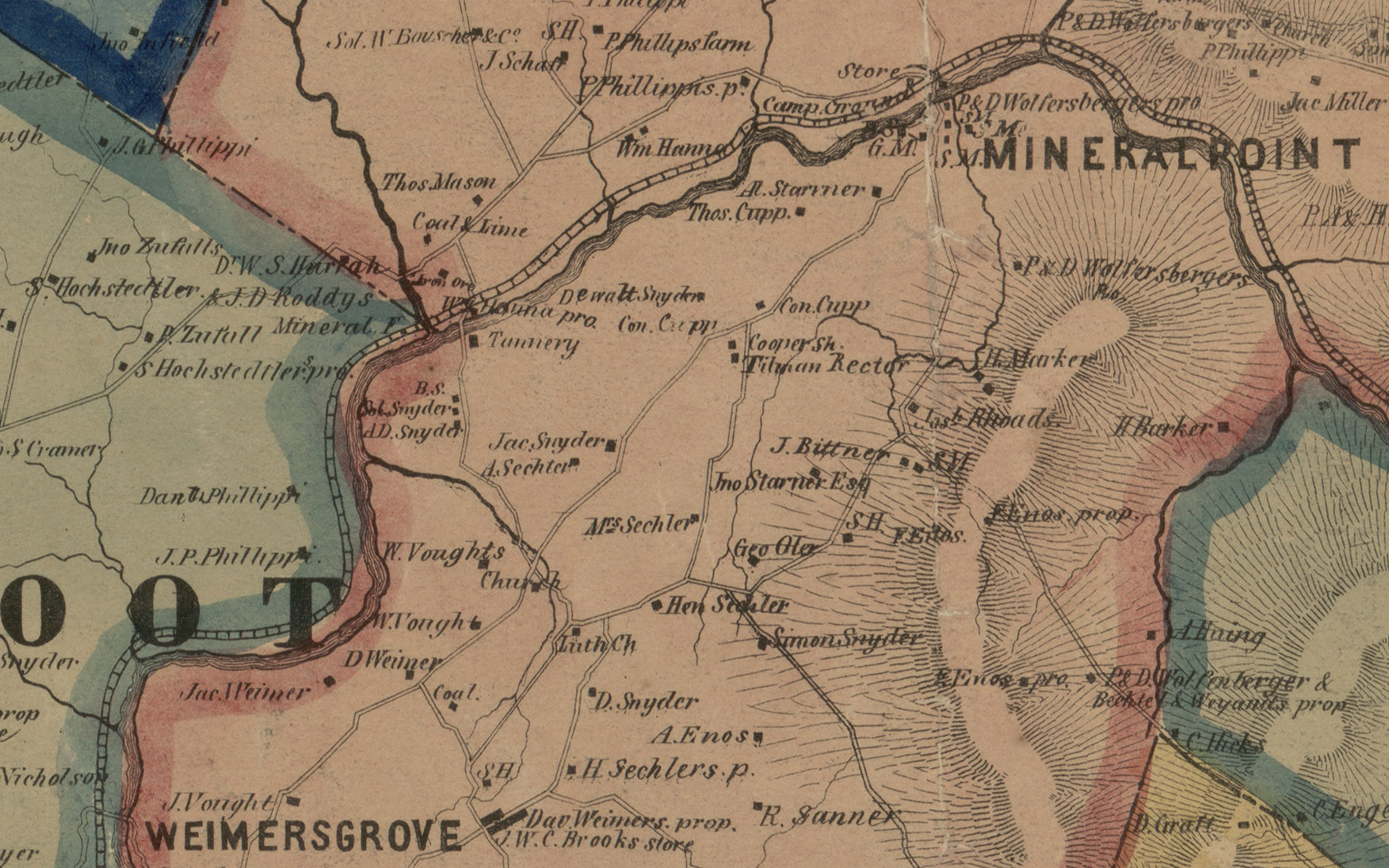
Casselman & Mineral Point Area, Somerset County, Pennsylvania, 1860

Casselman is at 39°53′9″N 79°12′33″W (39.885828, -79.209148). According to the United States Census Bureau, the borough has a total area of 0.2 square miles (0.52 km^{2}), all land.

Casselman sits on the bank of the Casselman River, along the far eastern tip of Upper Turkeyfoot Township. The accompanying map shows the area that later became the borough of Casselman, around the capital "T" in the "OOT". Mineral Point to the northeast is an earlier name for Rockwood.

== Demographics ==
Historical population
Census	Pop.	Note	%±
1880	88		—
1900	150		—
1910	166		10.7%
1920	242		45.8%
1930	132		−45.5%
1940	135		2.3%
1950	130		−3.7%
1960	103		−20.8%
1970	114		10.7%
1980	114		0.0%
1990	89		−21.9%
2000	99		11.2%
2010	94		−5.1%
2020	104		10.6%
2021 (est.)	104	Steady	0.0%
U.S. Decennial Census

At the 2000 census there were 99 people, 40 households, and 33 families living in the borough. The population density was 513.3 inhabitants per square mile (198.2/km^{2}). There were 46 housing units at an average density of 238.5 per square mile (92.1/km^{2}). The racial makeup of the borough was 100.00% White. Of the 40 households 37.5% had children under the age of 18 living with them, 70.0% were married couples living together, 7.5% had a female householder with no husband present, and 17.5% were non-families. 15.0% of households were one person and 15.0% were one person aged 65 or older. The average household size was 2.48 and the average family size was 2.67.

The age distribution was 22.2% under the age of 18, 6.1% from 18 to 24, 31.3% from 25 to 44, 24.2% from 45 to 64, and 16.2% 65 or older. The median age was 38 years. For every 100 females there were 94.1 males. For every 100 females age 18 and over, there were 97.4 males.

The median household income was $30,000 and the median family income was $38,750. Males had a median income of $26,563 versus $41,250 for females. The per capita income for the borough was $13,543. There were 14.7% of families and 15.2% of the population living below the poverty line, including 9.1% of under eighteens and 53.8% of those over 64.
