= Rockwood, Pennsylvania =

Borough in Pennsylvania, US

Rockwood, Pennsylvania previously Mineral Point (c. 1857)
- Borough
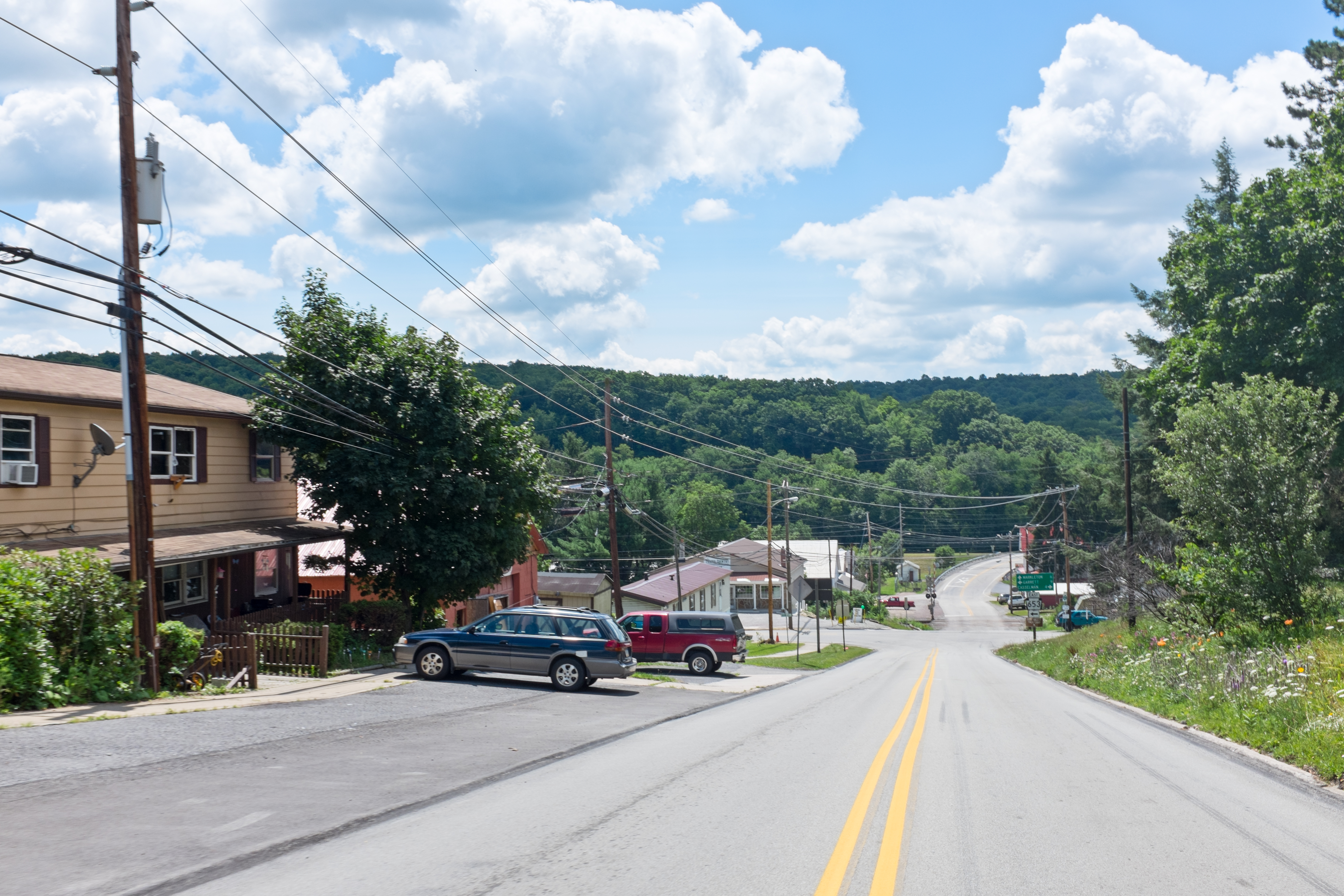
- View down Bridge St.

- Location of Rockwood in Somerset County, Pennsylvania.

- Location within Pennsylvania
- Coordinates: 39°54′58″N 79°09′21″W
- Country: United States
- State: Pennsylvania
- County: Somerset
- Settled: 1857
- Incorporated: 1885

Government
  - Type: Borough Council

Area
  - Total: 0.34 sq mi (0.87 km^{2})
  - Land: 0.34 sq mi (0.87 km^{2})
  - Water: 0 sq mi (0.00 km^{2})
- Elevation: 1,837 ft (560 m)

Population (2020)
  - Total: 843
  - Density: 2,523.3/sq mi (974.27/km^{2})
- Time zone: UTC-5 (Eastern (EST))
  - Summer (DST): UTC-4 (EDT)
- Zip code: 15557
- Area code: 814
- FIPS code: 42-65736
- Website: https://rockwoodborough.org/

Rockwood is a borough in Somerset County, Pennsylvania, United States. The population was 850 at the 2020 census. It is part of the Johnstown, Pennsylvania, Metropolitan Statistical Area, and located due north of Pennsylvania's highest peak, Mount Davis, which significantly constricts land travel routing south of the municipality.

== History ==
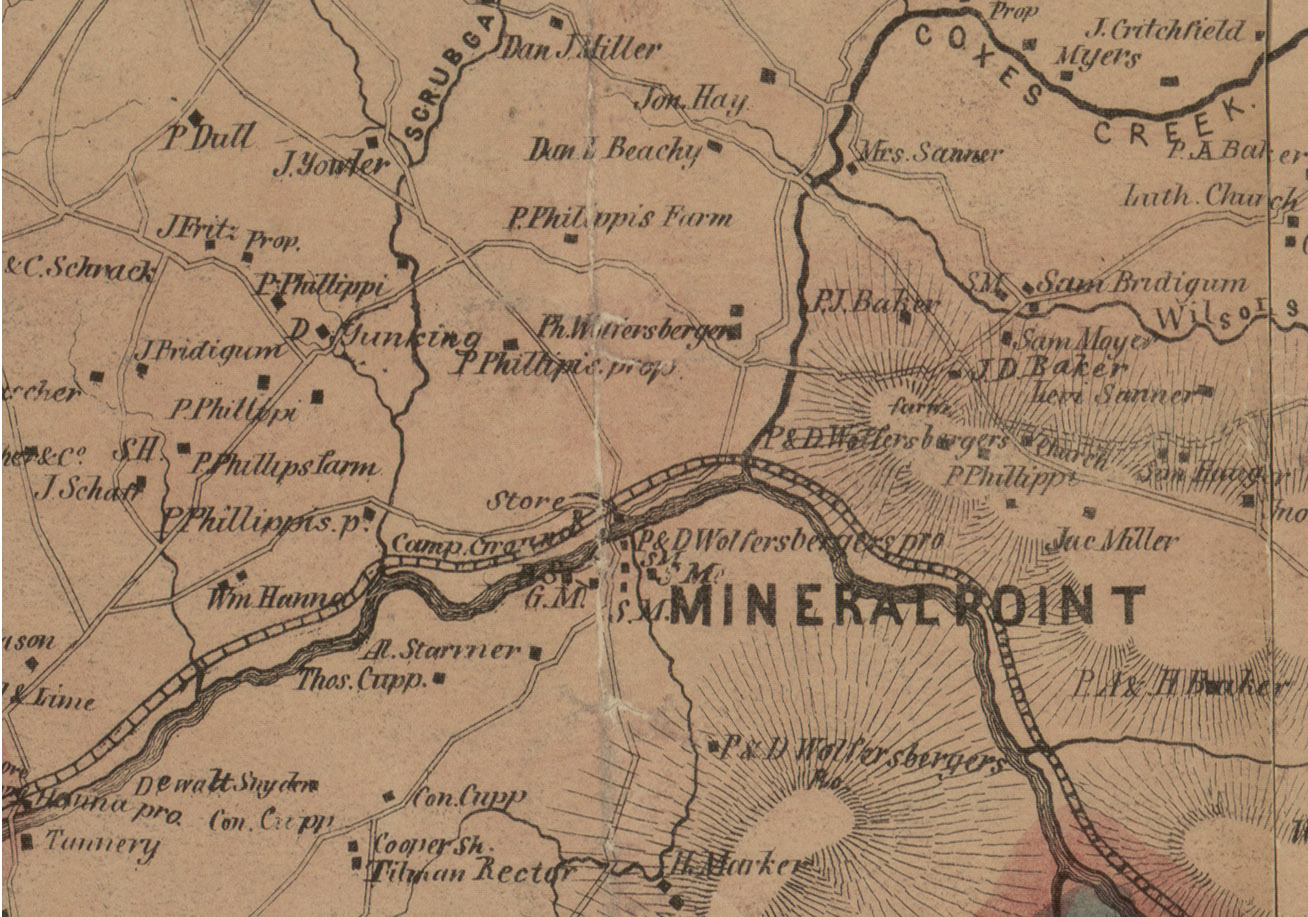
Mineral Point, Somerset County, Pennsylvania, 1860

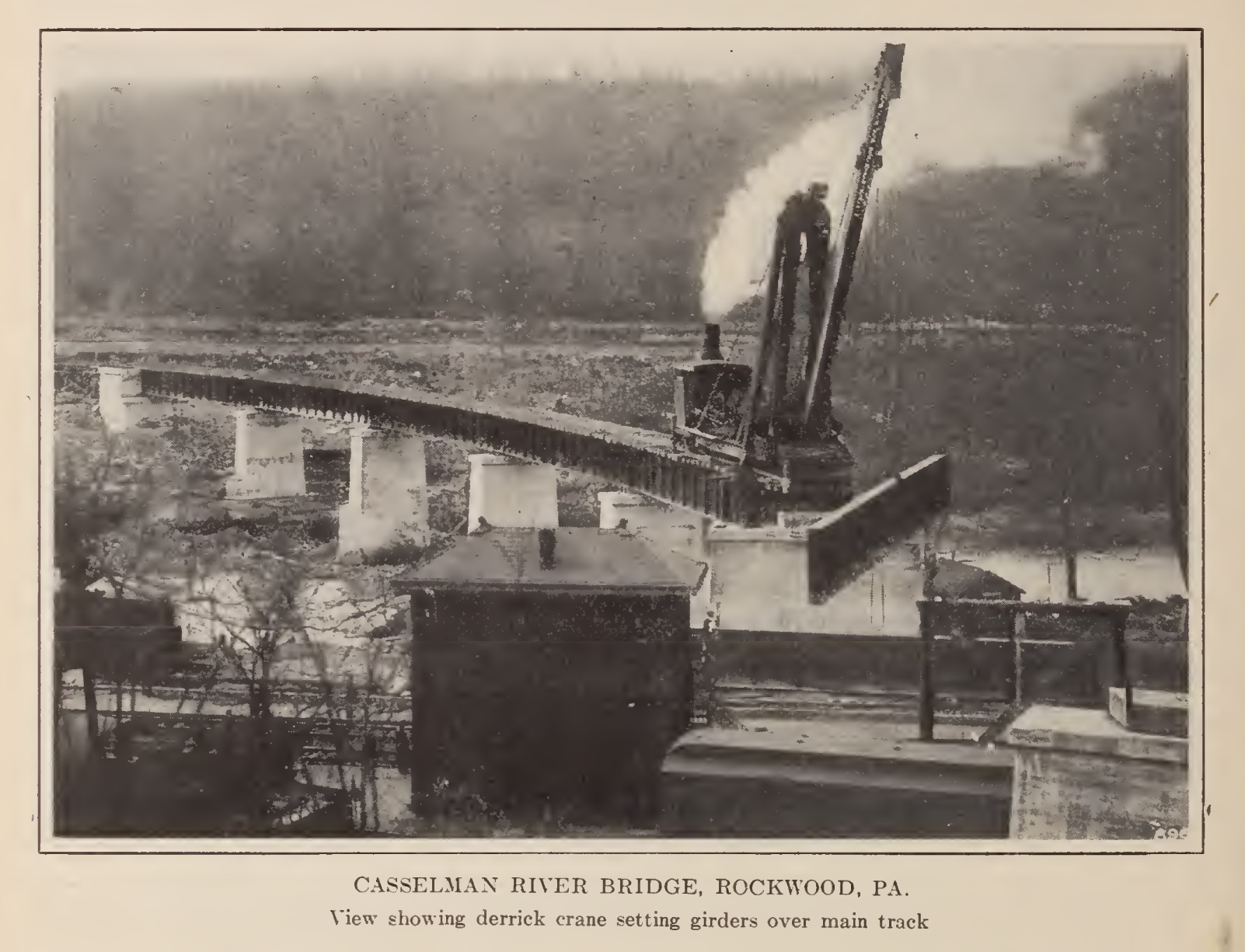
Construction of Casselman River Bridge, Rockwood, PA, circa 1914

Rockwood was initially known as Shaff's Bridge and then Mineral Point. Philip Wolfersberger built a house in what is now Rockwood in 1856, and he laid out the town in 1857 with Martin Meyers serving as the primary surveyor. John Poister built a hotel in 1860. 1868 saw the development of a post office, Henry Werner built a tannery in 1869, and a railroad depot was built in 1871. J.D. Miller and E.D. Miller opened a mercantile, Miller & Bro., and in 1874 they expanded the business to take in Samuel A. Haines as a partner, forming Miller Bros. & Haines.

Philip Stauffer Wolfersberger, a son of the above Philip Wolfersberger, was a ticket agent of the Baltimore & Ohio Railroad (B&O) and was instrumental in getting the current name of Rockwood to take hold. A view of Mineral Point / Rockwood appeared in a collection of photographs from along the B&O's lines that was published in book form in 1872 and digitized by the DeGolyer Library, Southern Methodist University.

A collision between two trains on the Pittsburgh & Connellsville Railroad, occurring about three miles east of Rockwood, claimed six lives in November 1894. Eleven individuals were injured when two trains collided on the P&C line just outside of Rockwood on Dec. 29, 1898. Another collision between two trains near Rockwood injured 24 people on February 16, 1912.

The B&O Railroad was a major east-west transportation artery in the region, with many people using it to pass over the Appalachian Mountains. One exciting event occurred in 1907, when President Theodore Roosevelt made a brief stop in Rockwood during his trip to Ohio to attend the funeral of Ida McKinley, the wife of former U.S. President William McKinley. As the Rockwood community grew and prospered, the bustling town became the home of numerous Christian congregations. St. Luke's Evangelical Lutheran Church was dedicated on Sunday, Dec. 14, 1884, with J.H. Zinn serving as the pastor. By 1914, at least five denominations had churches in Rockwood and the immediate vicinity: Lutheran, Methodist, Reformed, United Brethren, and United Evangelical. The First National Bank of Rockwood was established in 1900, with Penrose Wolfe and James McKelvey serving as some of its first officers.

The Baltimore & Ohio Railroad passes through Rockwood as it bends northerly in a long bow about the roots of Mount Davis, and it is now owned and operated by CSX, with daily Amtrak express trains between Pittsburgh and Cumberland, MD passing through the town and the nearby Cumberland Narrows. It is situated near and below the West slope-side summit-point of both the Nemacolin Trail and Braddock's Road, as well as the railway as each ascended past the crest up through the Cumberland Narrows pass from the forks of the Potomac at Harper's Ferry. The town was thus an important stop over point in the post-American Revolution westward migration into the Ohio Country and via the river boats built in Brownsville. The Penrose Wolf Building was added to the National Register of Historic Places in 2002.

=== Somerset & Mineral Point Railroad / Somerset & Cambria Branch / Rockwood & Johnstown Line ===
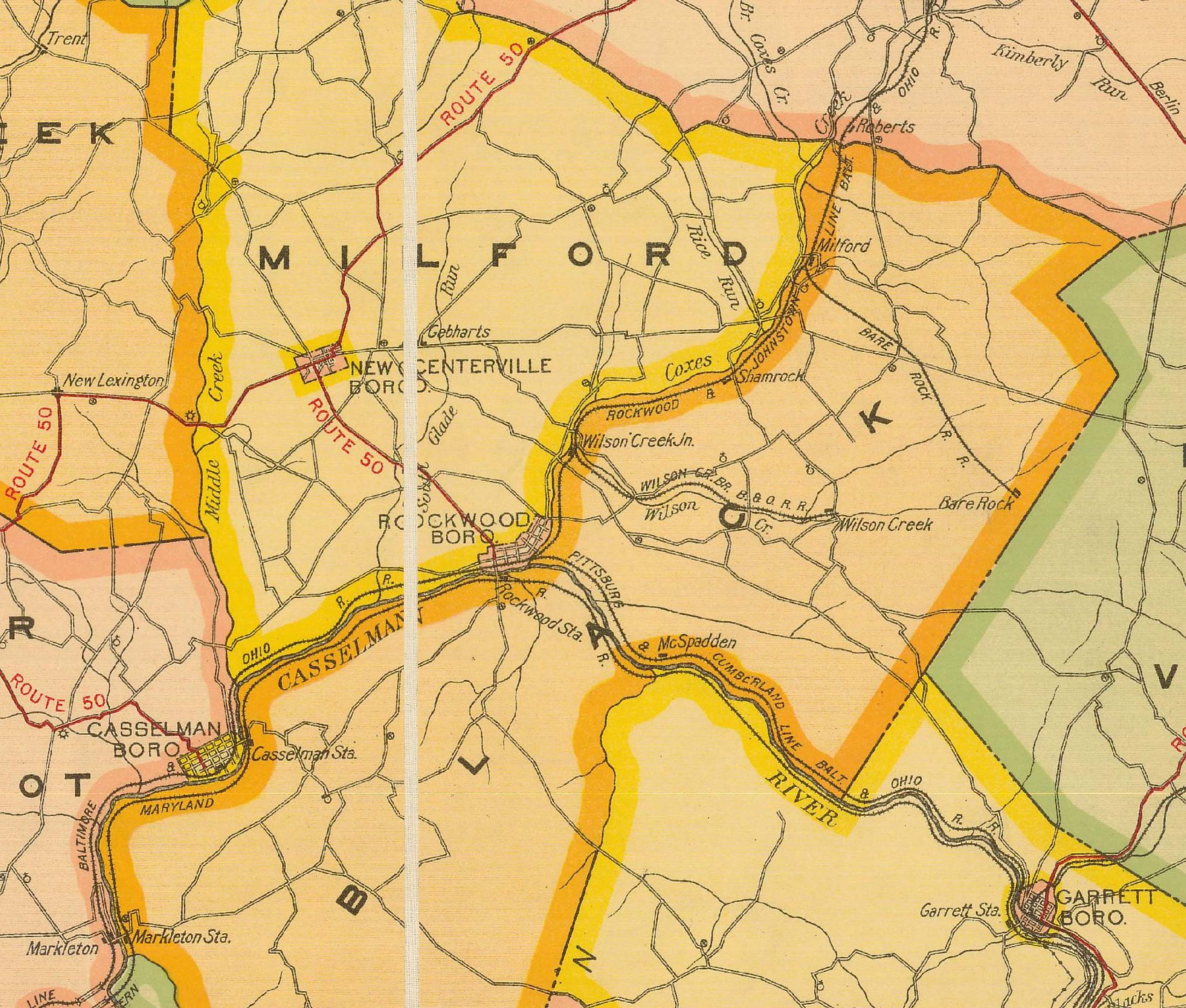
Rockwood, Somerset County, Pennsylvania, 1915

The Somerset & Mineral Point Railroad connected the town of Somerset with the Pittsburgh & Connellsville Railroad (owned by the B&O) as it passed through Mineral Point / Rockwood. (The Somerset & Mineral Point Railroad is labelled as the Rockwood & Johnstown Line on the accompanying section of Benedict & Strum's 1915 Somerset County public road map). Both the Somerset & Mineral Point Railroad and the Pittsburgh & Connellsville Railroad were completed in 1871; the final section of the line between Pittsburgh & Cumberland was completed on the afternoon of April 10, 1871, with the final rail being laid near Forge Bridge, about 3 miles to the west of Mineral Point. There were eight stations located along the Somerset & Mineral Point line as it ran northeast along Coxes Creek: Mineral Point, Sames, Baker's, Milford, Mud Pike Crossing, Roberts, Cantner, and Somerset. Two individuals who were involved in the founding of Ursina, which had its own small branch railroad further south in Somerset County, were officers of the Somerset & Mineral Point Railroad in 1873: William J. Baer was President and H.L. Baer was Secretary. The B&O bought the 10-mile Somerset & Mineral Point Railroad in 1879 for $60,000, knowing that an extension of the line to Johnstown, Pennsylvania, in Cambria County, was quite possible; this extension had already received legislative approval with session law no. 321 on Aug. 12, 1873. The Johnstown & Somerset Railroad followed the Stonycreek valley north-by-northeast from Somerset through Stoystown to Johnstown; it was built in 1881. The result was a rail line known as the Somerset & Cambria Branch Railroad stretching between the Pittsburgh & Connellsville Railroad at Rockwood and the Pennsylvania Railroad at Johnstown. The Somerset & Cambria Branch later became known as the S&C Subdivision.

=== Company Branch Railroad Lines ===
In 1891 the Somerset Stone Company built a branch line from the Somerset & Cambria railroad's station at Milford east to its operation at Bare Rocks, and the Bare Rock Rail Road Company was incorporated by John Murdock, J.M. Murdock, W.F. Murdock, J.C. Duncan, Samuel Fox, Josiah Woy, E.B. McColly, and S.F. Gill in 1892. This connecting Milford Station was also known as Woy Station, where Harry Neff was the telegraph operator and Jacob Neff was the engineer of the Bare Rock line in 1893. A tragic accident occurred along this company line on the evening of April 25, 1893, killing several people. In 1900 the Wilson Creek Coal Company constructed another branch railroad off of the Somerset & Cambria; this company line ran from about one mile north of Rockwood to its mining property about three miles to the east, following the course of Wilson Creek.

== Geography ==
Rockwood is located at 39°54′58″N 79°9′21″W (39.916222, -79.155808). It is situated near and below the west-side crest of the Eastern Continental Divide separating the Potomac-Mississippi riverine systems along the north bank of the Casselman River—whose head waters are to the south in nearby Western Maryland—and just west of its confluence with Coxes Creek.

According to the United States Census Bureau, the borough has a total area of 0.3 square miles (0.78 km^{2}), all land.

== Demographics ==
Historical population
Census	Pop.	Note	%±
1880	331		—
1890	553		67.1%
1900	685		23.9%
1910	1,300		89.8%
1920	1,362		4.8%
1930	1,176		−13.7%
1940	1,375		16.9%
1950	1,237		−10.0%
1960	1,101		−11.0%
1970	1,051		−4.5%
1980	1,058		0.7%
1990	1,014		−4.2%
2000	954		−5.9%
2010	890		−6.7%
2020	843		−5.3%
2021 (est.)	842	▼	−0.1%

As of the census of 2000, there were 954 people, 406 households, and 272 families residing in the borough. The population density was 3,053.4 inhabitants per square mile (1,178.9/km^{2}). There were 421 housing units at an average density of 1,347.4 per square mile (520.2/km^{2}). The racial makeup of the borough was 99.58% White, 0.10% Native American, 0.10% Asian, and 0.21% from two or more races.

There were 406 households, out of which 29.8% had children under the age of 18 living with them, 51.2% were married couples living together, 11.6% had a female householder with no husband present, and 33.0% were non-families. 29.1% of all households were made up of individuals, and 11.8% had someone living alone who was 65 years of age or older. The average household size was 2.28 and the average family size was 2.79.

In the borough the population was spread out, with 22.0% under the age of 18, 8.4% from 18 to 24, 27.7% from 25 to 44, 23.8% from 45 to 64, and 18.1% who were 65 years of age or older. The median age was 39 years. For every 100 females there were 92.3 males. For every 100 females age 18 and over, there were 92.7 males.

The median income for a household in the borough was $25,139, and the median income for a family was $31,023. Males had a median income of $26,500 versus $20,066 for females. The per capita income for the borough was $13,687. About 12.3% of families and 15.1% of the population were below the poverty line, including 13.7% of those under age 18 and 9.3% of those age 65 or over.

== Schools ==
The borough of Rockwood is served by the Rockwood Area School District, which includes Rockwood Area Elementary School and Rockwood Area Junior/Senior High School. Both schools are located along the borough's boundary with Milford Township. A second elementary school within the district was the Kingwood Elementary School, which was not within the borough of Rockwood. Kingwood Elementary School is now closed, and the building was sold to the Kingwood Church of God.

Typically, Rockwood Area High School graduates 65-80 students per year.

== Transportation ==
Pennsylvania Route 653 runs through Rockwood. It comes southeast from New Centerville through part of Milford Township, entering Rockwood as Bridge Street. PA 653 then turns east onto Main Street, which it follows through the borough and out of town, entering Milford Township again briefly before crossing Coxes Creek and entering Black Township. The nearest limited-access highway is the Pennsylvania Turnpike at Somerset (Exit 110), 10 miles (16 km) to the north.

Up until April 30, 1971, Rockwood was a stop on the Baltimore & Ohio's daily Washington—Akron passenger train. Since 1981 Amtrak's Capitol Limited (Chicago—Washington) has passed through Rockwood without stopping. Since 1990 local officials have lobbied for Rockwood to be added as a stop, and in October 2009 Amtrak released a feasibility study which placed the cost of a new station at $2.2 million. Proponents of the stop suggest that it might even benefit local resorts Seven Springs and Hidden Valley by increasing tourism business throughout the area.
