= Ursina, Pennsylvania =

Borough in Pennsylvania, US

- Borough
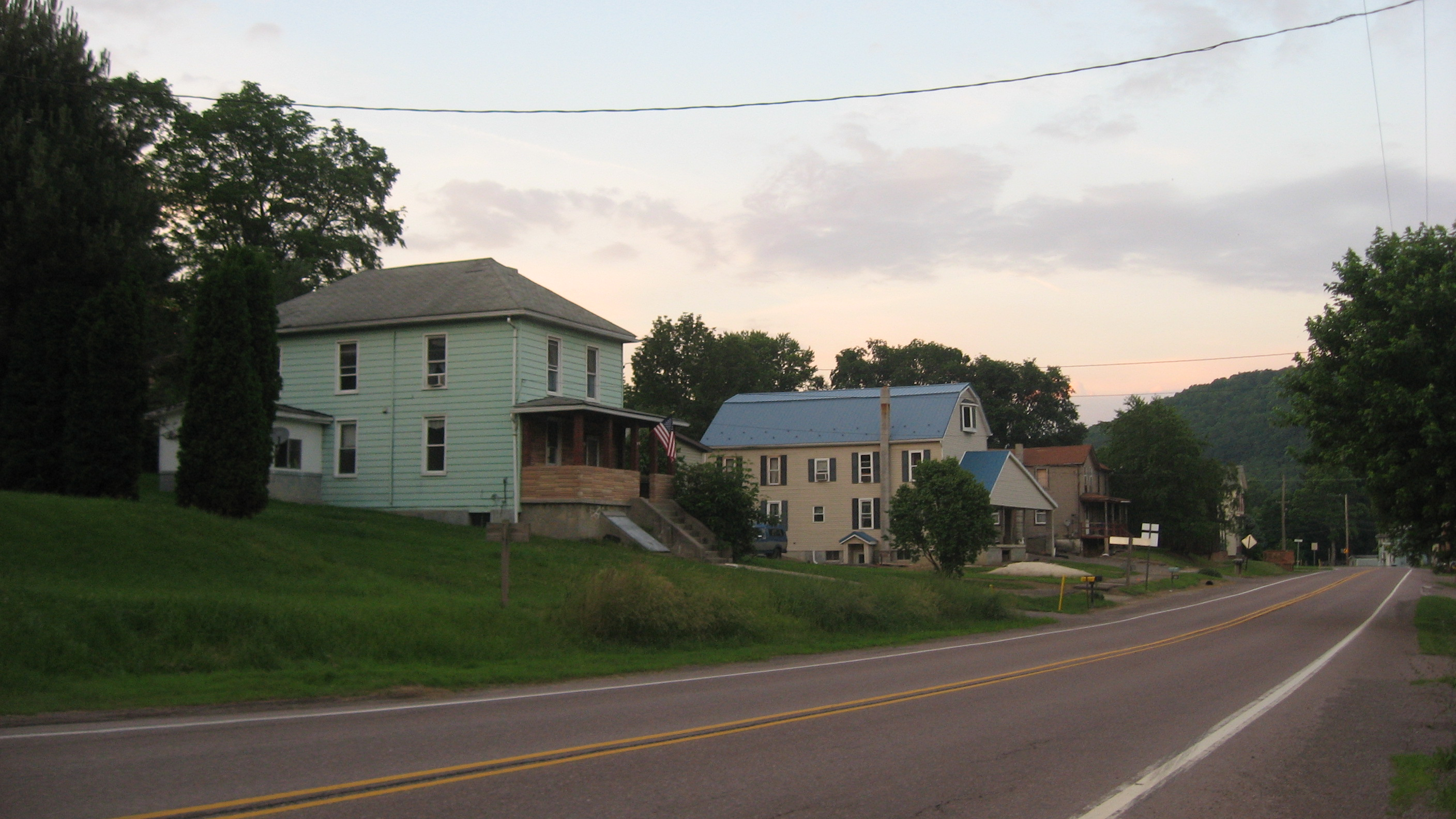
- Houses on Park Street

- Location of Ursina in Somerset County, Pennsylvania.

- Location within Pennsylvania
- Coordinates: 39°49′0″N 79°19′52″W
- Country: United States
- State: Pennsylvania
- County: Somerset
- Settled: 1868
- Incorporated: 1872

Government
  - Type: Borough Council

Area
  - Total: 0.90 sq mi (2.33 km^{2})
  - Land: 0.90 sq mi (2.33 km^{2})
  - Water: 0 sq mi (0.00 km^{2})

Population (2020)
  - Total: 247
  - Density: 274.6/sq mi (106.01/km^{2})
- Time zone: UTC-5 (Eastern (EST))
  - Summer (DST): UTC-4 (EDT)
- Zip code: 15485
- Area code: 814
- FIPS code: 42-79424

Ursina is a borough in Somerset County, Pennsylvania, United States. It is part of the Johnstown, Pennsylvania, Metropolitan Statistical Area. The population was 244 at the 2020 census.

== History ==
Ursina takes its name from Judge William J. Baer, owner of the land when the town was laid out in 1868 by surveyors H.L. Baer and R.J. Botzer; "bear" in Latin is Ursus. Judge Baer had a blacksmith shop and a sawmill built, Ephraim Kreger built the first house, and Isaac A. Jenkins built the first store, all in that same year of 1868. A school was built in 1870, with John Griffith serving as the first teacher. Ursina was organized as a borough in 1872.

The Ursina Branch Railroad was built by the Pittsburgh and Baltimore Coal, Coke, and Iron Company in 1871–1872 in order to more easily access the coal deposits in the area. This four mile line only operated for about three years before the ongoing effects of the Panic of 1873 caused it to cease.

== Geography ==
Ursina is located at 39°49′0″N 79°19′52″W (39.816562, -79.331002). According to the United States Census Bureau, the borough has a total area of 0.7 square miles (1.8 km^{2}), all land. Ursina is surrounded by Lower Turkeyfoot Township, and the borough of Confluence sits to its west.

=== Climate ===
The climate in this area has mild differences between highs and lows, and there is adequate rainfall year-round. According to the Köppen Climate Classification system, Ursina has a marine west coast climate, abbreviated "Cfb" on climate maps.

== Demographics ==
Historical population
| Census | Pop. | Note | %± |
|---|---|---|---|
| 1880 | 445 | | — |
| 1890 | 405 | | −9.0% |
| 1900 | 423 | | 4.4% |
| 1910 | 338 | | −20.1% |
| 1920 | 286 | | −15.4% |
| 1930 | 255 | | −10.8% |
| 1940 | 301 | | 18.0% |
| 1950 | 334 | | 11.0% |
| 1960 | 313 | | −6.3% |
| 1970 | 284 | | −9.3% |
| 1980 | 311 | | 9.5% |
| 1990 | 327 | | 5.1% |
| 2000 | 254 | | −22.3% |
| 2010 | 225 | | −11.4% |
| 2020 | 247 | | 9.8% |
| 2021 (est.) | 241 | ▼ | −2.4% |
U.S. Decennial Census

As of the census of 2000, there were 254 people, 112 households, and 74 families residing in the borough. The population density was 344.3 people per square mile (132.9 people/km^{2}). There were 130 housing units at an average density of 176.2 per square mile (68.0/km^{2}). The racial makeup of the borough was 98.82% White, 0.39% Asian, and 0.79% from two or more races.

There were 112 households, out of which 25.0% had children under the age of 18 living with them, 55.4% were married couples living together, 8.9% had a female householder with no husband present, and 33.9% were non-families. 28.6% of all households were made up of individuals, and 14.3% had someone living alone who was 65 years of age or older. The average household size was 2.27 and the average family size was 2.73.

In the borough the population was spread out, with 17.7% under the age of 18, 6.7% from 18 to 24, 28.0% from 25 to 44, 30.3% from 45 to 64, and 17.3% who were 65 years of age or older. The median age was 42 years. For every 100 females there were 100.0 males. For every 100 females age 18 and over, there were 97.2 males.

The median income for a household in the borough was $20,625, and the median income for a family was $31,071. Males had a median income of $21,023 versus $15,208 for females. The per capita income for the borough was $11,814. About 15.2% of families and 27.6% of the population were below the poverty line, including 50.0% of those under the age of eighteen and 13.5% of those 65 or over.
