= Henry Clay Township, Fayette County, Pennsylvania =

Township in Pennsylvania, US

Coordinates: 39°48′00″N 79°22′28″W

Henry Clay Township
- Township
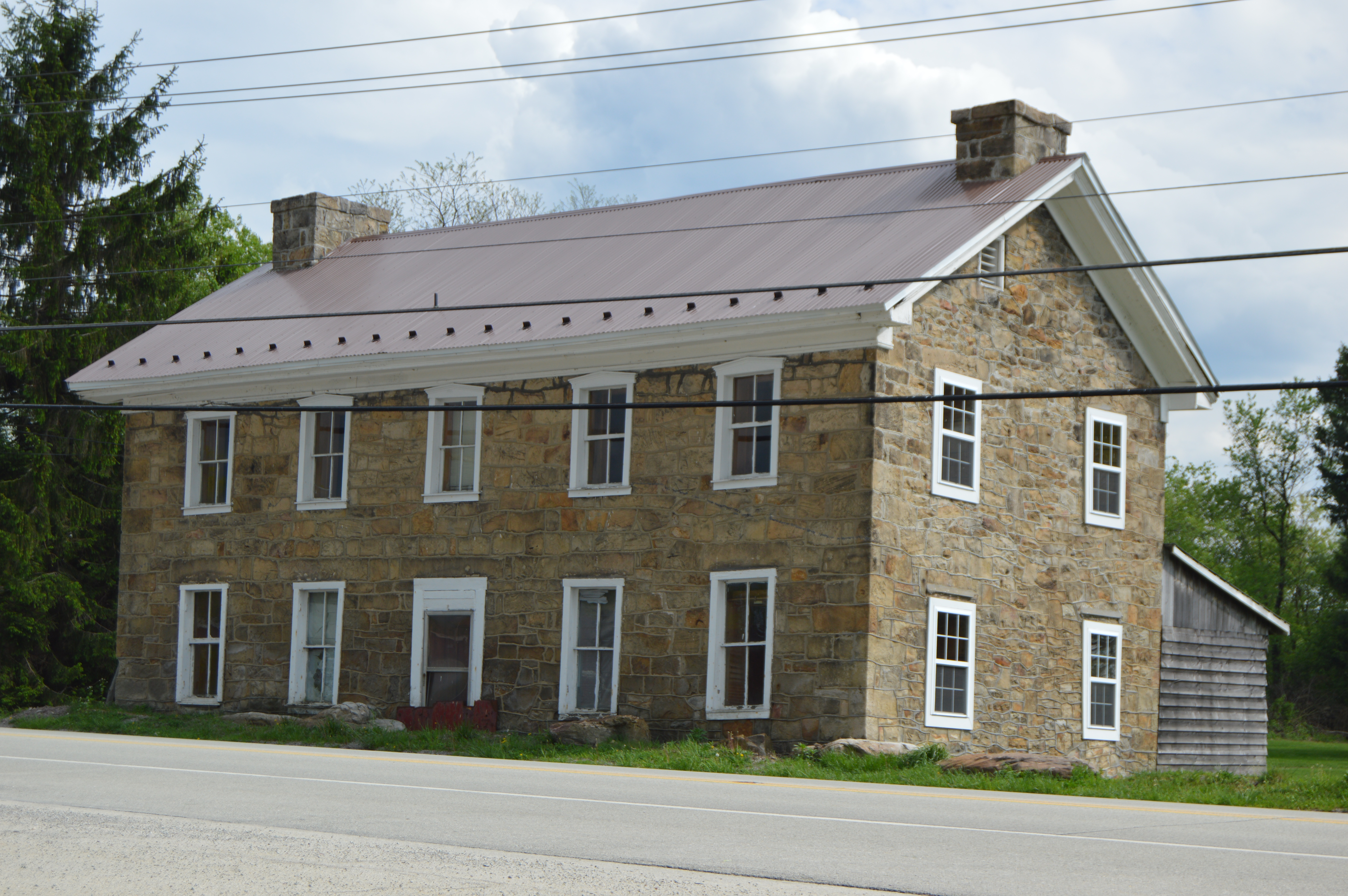
- Tavern on the National Road, northwest of Markleysburg
- Etymology: Henry Clay
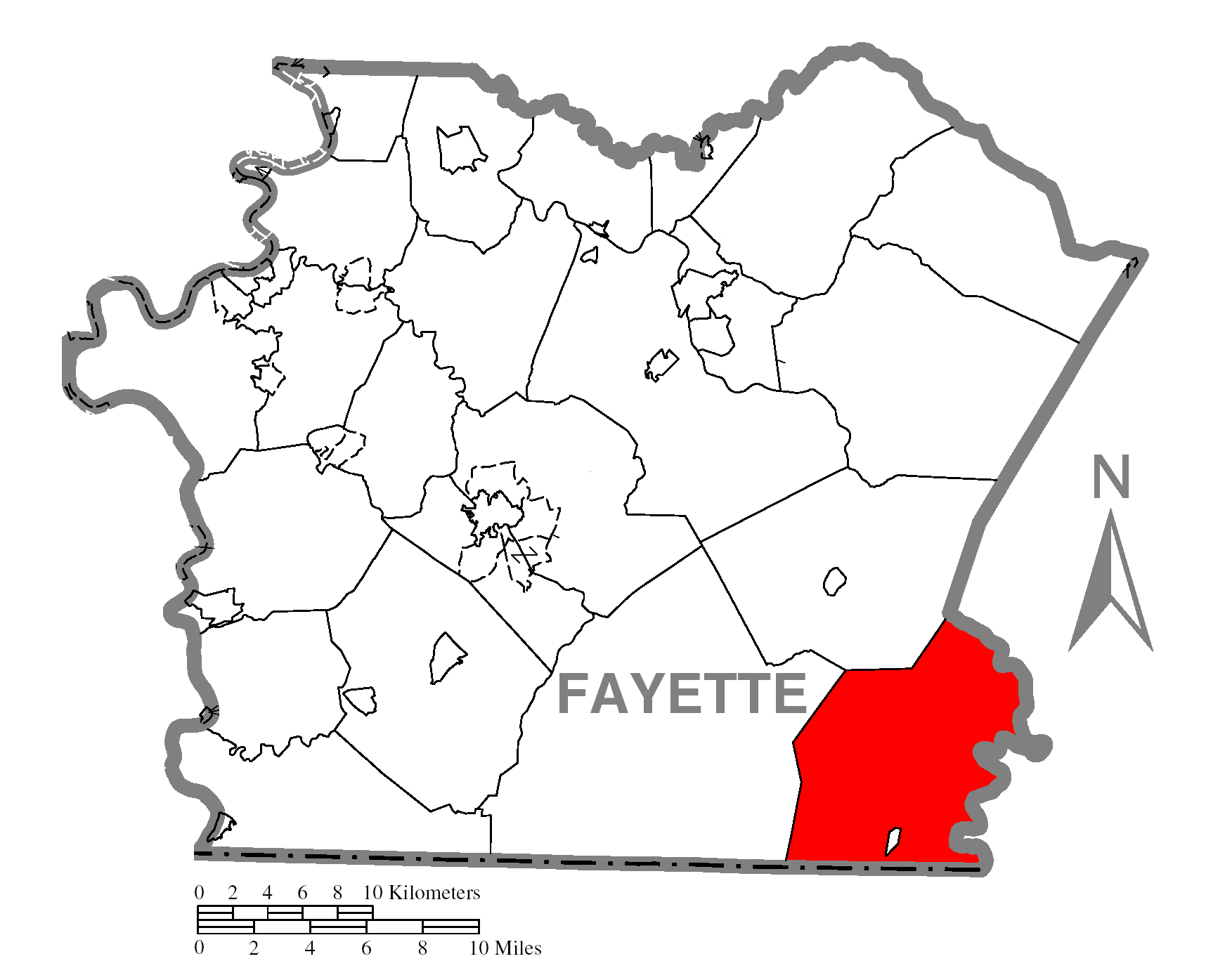
- Location of Henry Clay Township in Fayette County

- Location of Fayette County in Pennsylvania
- Country: United States
- State: Pennsylvania
- County: Fayette
- Established: 1824-06-09

Area
  - Total: 53.05 sq mi (137.41 km^{2})
  - Land: 51.24 sq mi (132.72 km^{2})
  - Water: 1.81 sq mi (4.69 km^{2})

Population (2020)
  - Total: 1,764 ▼
  - Estimate (2022): 1,714
  - Density: 39.2/sq mi (15.14/km^{2})
- Time zone: UTC-4 (EST)
  - Summer (DST): UTC-5 (EDT)
- Area code: 724
- FIPS code: 42-051-33896
- Website: https://henryclaytownship.com/

Henry Clay Township is a township in Fayette County, Pennsylvania, United States. The population was 1,764 at the 2020 census. The township was created June 9, 1824, from the eastern portion of Wharton Township. It is named for 19th-century American statesman Henry Clay. The northwestern corner of its territory was used to create Stewart Township on November 17, 1855. It is served by the Uniontown Area School District.

Unincorporated communities located within the township include Flat Rock, Fiketown, and Elk Park.

Information can be sourced at www.henryclaytownship.com

== Geography ==
Henry Clay Township is in the southeastern corner of Fayette County. It is bordered by Stewart Township to the north, Lower Turkeyfoot Township in Somerset County to the northeast, the borough of Confluence and Addison Township in Somerset County to the east, and Wharton Township to the west. To the south, it borders both West Virginia and Maryland. The borough of Markleysburg is in the southern part of the township but is a separate municipality.

According to the United States Census Bureau, the township has a total area of 53.1 square miles (137.4 km^{2}), of which 51.2 square miles (132.7 km^{2}) is land and 1.8 square miles (4.7 km^{2}), or 3.41%, is water. The Youghiogheny River forms the eastern border of the township, which is the border with Somerset County.

The southern end of Laurel Hill is in the northern part of the township, with a high point in the township of 2,930 feet (890 m) above sea level. The Youghiogheny River cuts a gorge through Laurel Hill just to the north, where the lowest point in the township is 1,270 feet (390 m) above sea level.

U.S. Route 40, the National Road, crosses Henry Clay Township, leading southeast to Cumberland, Maryland, and northwest to Uniontown. Pennsylvania Route 281 crosses US 40 near the center of the township, leading northeast to Confluence and southwest through Markleysburg to the West Virginia border.

== Demographics ==
Historical population
Census	Pop.	Note	%±
2010	2,066		—
2020	1,764		−14.6%
2022 (est.)	1,714		−2.8%
U.S. Decennial Census

As of the 2000 census, there were 1,984 people, 742 households, and 549 families residing in the township. The population density was 38.7 inhabitants per square mile (14.9/km^{2}). There were 1,306 housing units at an average density of 25.5/sq mi (9.8/km^{2}). The racial makeup of the township was 99.45% White, 0.35% Native American, 0.10% Asian, and 0.10% from two or more races. Hispanic or Latino of any race were 0.35% of the population.

There were 742 households, out of which 33.4% had children under the age of 18 living with them, 60.1% were married couples living together, 8.5% had a female householder with no husband present, and 25.9% were non-families. 20.5% of all households were made up of individuals, and 9.6% had someone living alone who was 65 years of age or older. The average household size was 2.57 and the average family size was 2.95.

In the township the population was spread out, with 22.4% under the age of 18, 8.9% from 18 to 24, 28.8% from 25 to 44, 23.6% from 45 to 64, and 16.3% who were 65 years of age or older. The median age was 38 years. For every 100 females there were 100.8 males. For every 100 females age 18 and over, there were 100.5 males.

The median income for a household in the township was $27,256, and the median income for a family was $30,417. Males had a median income of $24,602 versus $19,333 for females. The per capita income for the township was $12,491. About 15.5% of families and 18.4% of the population were below the poverty line, including 27.1% of those under age 18 and 10.0% of those age 65 or over.
