= Pennsylvania Route 523 =

State highway in Somerset County, Pennsylvania, US

Pennsylvania Route 523

Route information
- Maintained by PennDOT
- Length: 7.468 mi (12.019 km)
- Existed: 1970–present

Major junctions
- South end: US 40 in Addison
- North end: PA 281 in Confluence

Location
- Country: United States
- State: Pennsylvania
- Counties: Somerset

Highway system
- Pennsylvania State Route System; Interstate; US; State; Scenic; Legislative
← US 522	→ PA 524

Pennsylvania Route 523 (PA 523) is a 7.5-mile-long (12.1 km) state highway located in Somerset County, Pennsylvania. The southern terminus is at U.S. Route 40 (US 40) in Addison. The northern terminus is at PA 281 in Confluence.

== Route description ==
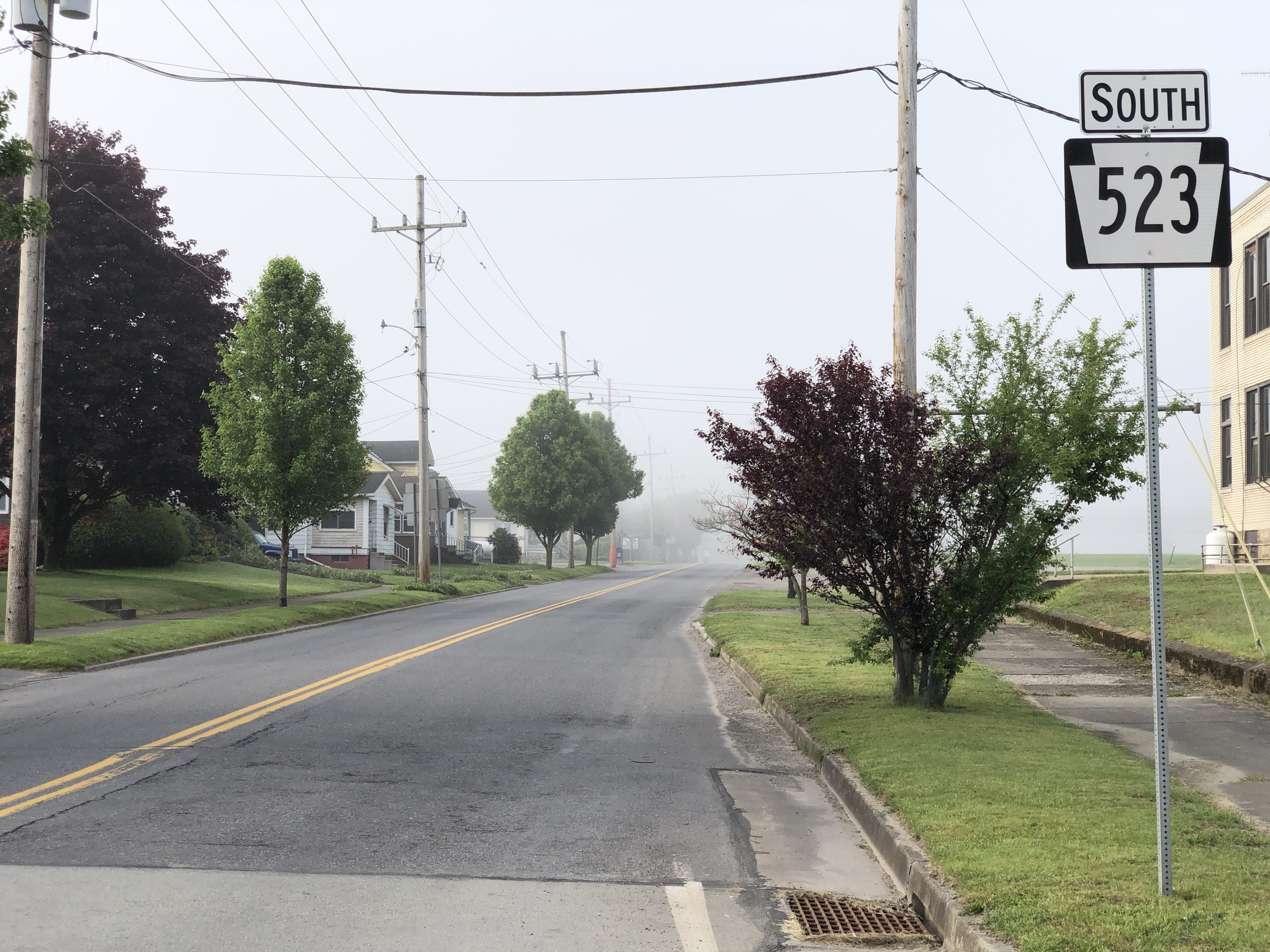
PA 523 southbound past PA 281 in Confluence

PA 523 begins at an intersection with US 40 east of the borough of Addison in Addison Township, heading northeast on two-lane undivided Listonburg Road. The road passes a mix of woods and farms, curving north into forested areas and heading through Listonburg. The route winds through more woodland with occasional farms, running through Beachly and Dumas. Farther north, PA 523 crosses the Casselman River into Lower Turkeyfoot Township and curves west at Harnedsville. The road passes more farmland and woodland, running a short distance to the south of CSX's Keystone Subdivision railroad line and north of the Casselman River. The route continues into the borough of Confluence, where the road, river, and railroad all bend to the north. The road becomes Oden Street and passes homes and business, reaching an intersection with PA 281. At this point, PA 281 turns north to form a concurrency with the route, passing more residences. PA 523 ends at the point where PA 281 turns to the east onto Logan Place.

== Major intersections ==
The entire route is in Somerset County.

Location	mi	km	Destinations	Notes
Addison Township	0.000	0.000	US 40 (National Pike) – Uniontown, Cumberland	Southern terminus
Confluence	7.155	11.515	PA 281 south – Markleysburg, Ohiopyle	South end of PA 281 overlap
Confluence	7.468	12.019	PA 281 north (Logan Place) – Somerset	Northern terminus; north end of PA 281 overlap
1.000 mi = 1.609 km; 1.000 km = 0.621 mi: Concurrency terminus
