= Stewart Township, Pennsylvania =

Township in Pennsylvania, US

Coordinates: 39°54′00″N 79°26′59″W

Stewart Township
- Township
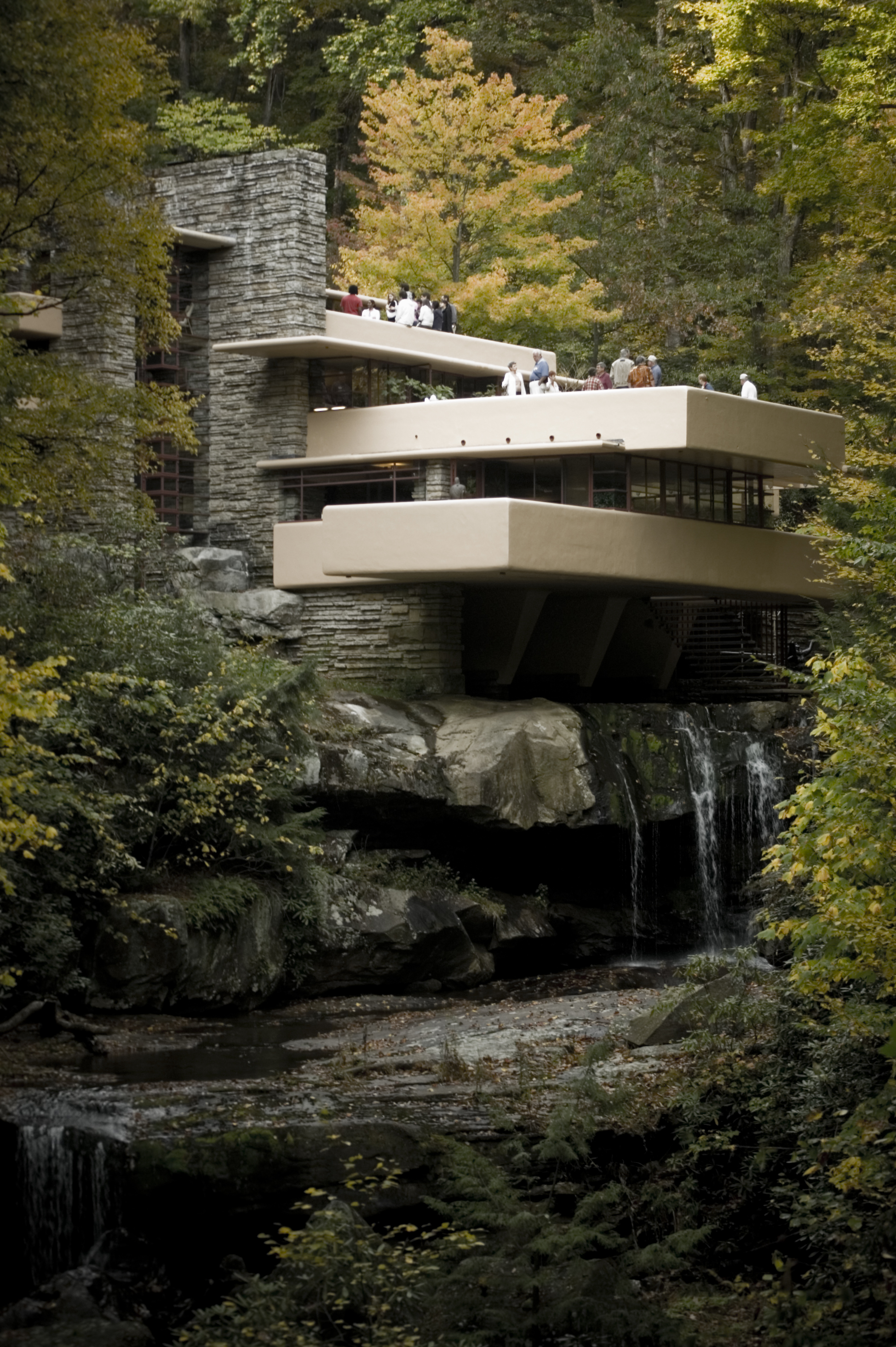
- Fallingwater is in Stewart Township.

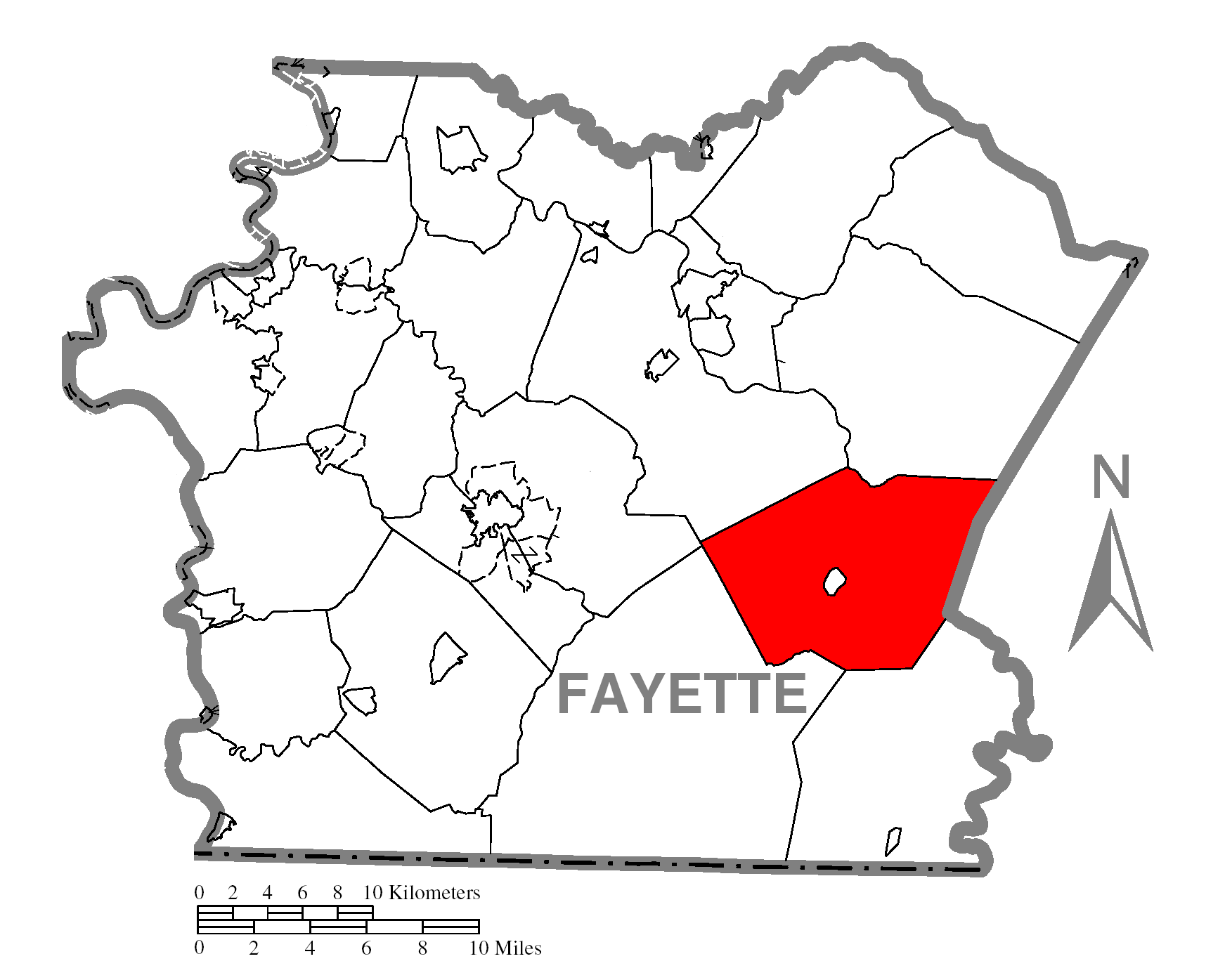
- Location of Stewart Township in Fayette County

- Location of Fayette County in Pennsylvania
- Country: United States
- State: Pennsylvania
- County: Fayette

Area
  - Total: 50.88 sq mi (131.77 km^{2})
  - Land: 50.40 sq mi (130.54 km^{2})
  - Water: 0.47 sq mi (1.23 km^{2})

Population (2020)
  - Total: 623
  - Estimate (2022): 612
  - Density: 14.1/sq mi (5.43/km^{2})
- Time zone: UTC-4 (EST)
  - Summer (DST): UTC-5 (EDT)
- Area code: 724
- FIPS code: 42-051-74080

Stewart Township is a township in Fayette County, Pennsylvania, United States. It is part of the Pittsburgh metropolitan area. The population was 623 at the 2020 census.

Stonerville and Kaufmann are the only villages in this very rural township, which is served by the Uniontown Area School District.

Two U.S. National Historic Landmarks are in Stewart Township: Kentuck Knob and Fallingwater, the latter also a UNESCO World Heritage Site. Both were designed by Frank Lloyd Wright and are open for touring.

== Geography ==
Stewart Township is on the eastern side of Fayette County, bordered to the east by Somerset County. The borough of Ohiopyle is at the center of the township but is a separate municipality. The Youghiogheny River flows through the township from southeast to north.

According to the United States Census Bureau, the township has a total area of 50.9 square miles (131.8 km^{2}), of which 50.4 square miles (130.5 km^{2}) is land and 0.46 square miles (1.2 km^{2}), or 0.93%, is water.

Pennsylvania Route 381 crosses the township, passing through Ohiopyle and leading northeast to Normalville and southwest to Farmington.

== Landmarks ==
Two homes designed by Frank Lloyd Wright are located in Stewart Township and are on the National Register of Historic Places.

The first is the internationally renowned Fallingwater house, perched over Bear Run waterfalls north of Ohiopyle. Public tours are offered, which allow enjoying Bear Run also.

The second Wright house is the Kentuck Knob residence, grounds, and sculpture park - located west of Ohiopyle and open to the public for tours and countryside walks.

== Demographics ==
Historical population
Census	Pop.	Note	%±
2000	743		—
2010	731		−1.6%
2020	623		−14.8%
2022 (est.)	612		−1.8%
U.S. Decennial Census

As of the 2000 census, there were 743 people, 275 households, and 215 families residing in the township. The population density was 14.7 people per square mile (5.7/km^{2}). There were 338 housing units at an average density of 6.7/sq mi (2.6/km^{2}). The racial makeup of the township was 99.46% White, 0.13% African American, and 0.40% from two or more races. Hispanic or Latino residents of any race were 0.40% of the population.

There were 275 households, out of which 33.5% had children under the age of 18 living with them, 68.7% were married couples living together, 4.0% had a female householder with no husband present, and 21.8% were non-families. 18.2% of all households were made up of individuals, and 8.7% had someone living alone who was 65 years of age or older. The average household size was 2.70 and the average family size was 3.07.

In the township, 25.2% of the population was under the age of 18, 7.0% from 18 to 24, 28.4% from 25 to 44, 25.2% from 45 to 64, and 14.3% was 65 years of age or older. The median age was 38 years. For every 100 females, there were 108.7 males. For every 100 females age 18 and over, there were 103.7 males.

The median income for a household in the township was $32,917, and the median income for a family was $35,060. Males had a median income of $26,786 versus $16,563 for females. The per capita income for the township was $15,754. About 5.9% of families and 11.0% of the population were below the poverty line, including 11.8% of those under age 18 and 14.5% of those age 65 or over.
