= Pennsylvania Route 653 =

State highway in Pennsylvania, US

Pennsylvania Route 653

Route information
- Maintained by PennDOT
- Length: 26.428 mi (42.532 km)

Major junctions
- West end: PA 381 in Springfield Township
- PA 281 concurrency from Middlecreek Township to New Centerville
- East end: SR 2047 in Garrett

Location
- Country: United States
- State: Pennsylvania
- Counties: Fayette; Somerset

Highway system
- Pennsylvania State Route System; Interstate; US; State; Scenic; Legislative
← PA 652	→ PA 654

Pennsylvania Route 653 (PA 653) is a 26-mile-long (42 km) state highway that is located in Fayette and Somerset counties in the Commonwealth of Pennsylvania in the United States.

The western terminus of this highway is situated at PA 381 in Springfield Township. The eastern terminus is located at the Mason Dixon Highway (former U.S. Route 219 or US 219) in Garrett.

== Route description ==
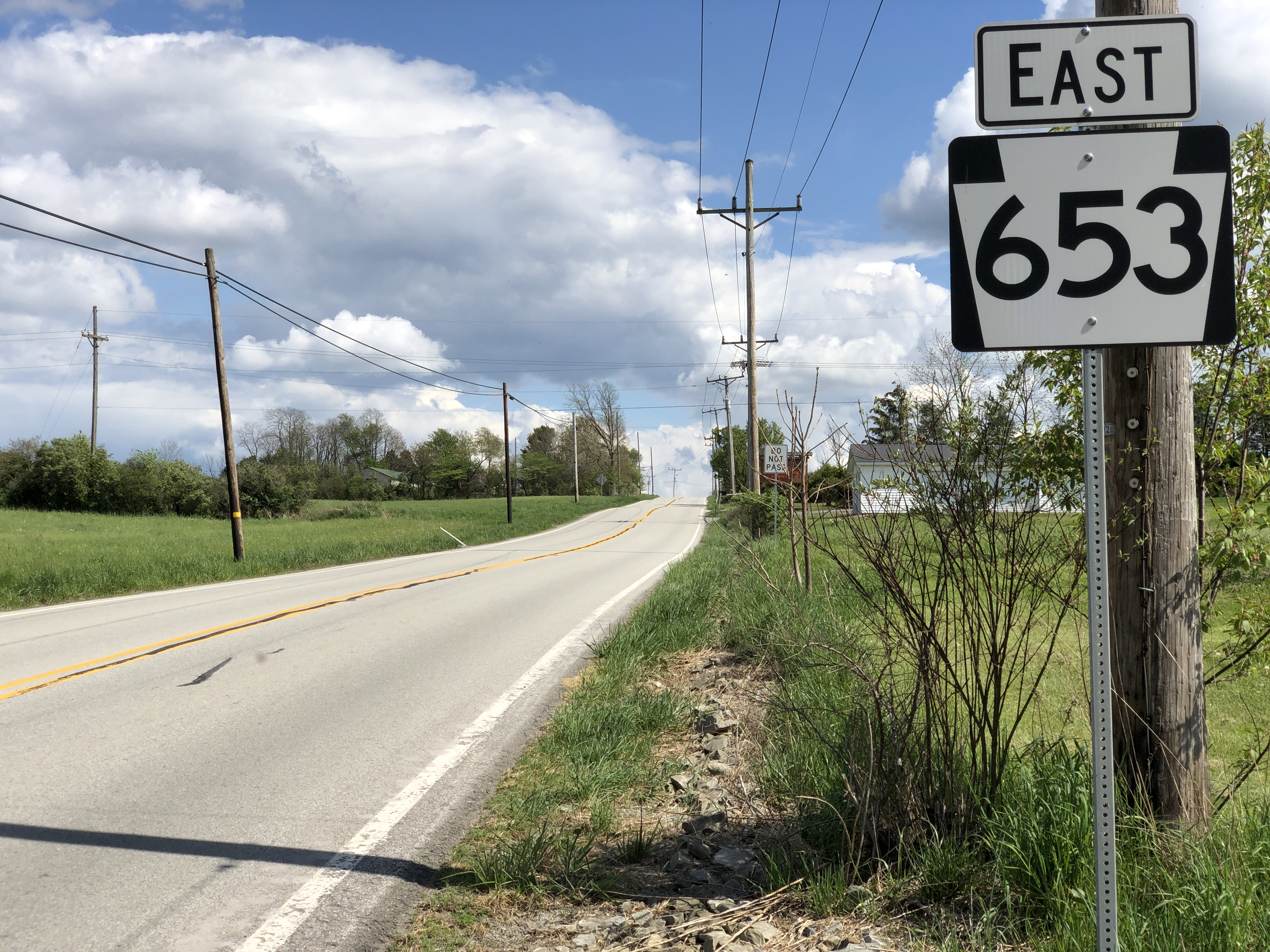
PA 653 eastbound in Black Township

PA 653 begins at an intersection with PA 381 in Springfield Township, Fayette County, heading east on two-lane undivided Jim Mount Road. The road passes through a mix of farmland and woodland before turning southeast into wooded areas, crossing Indian Creek. The route runs through more woodland with a few farm fields, turning east and heading into forested areas of Laurel Ridge State Park.

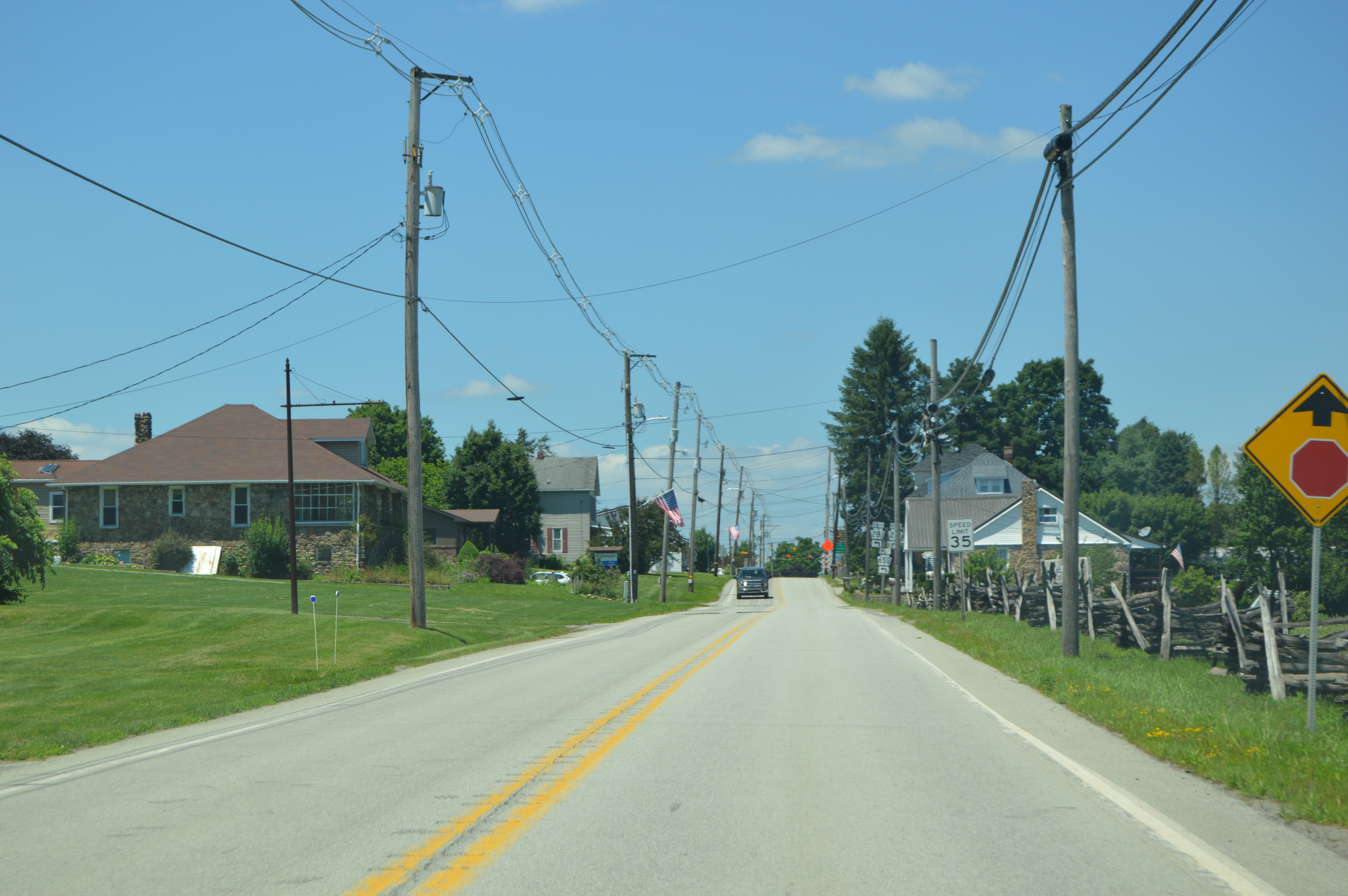
Bridge Street section of PA 653 in New Centerville

PA 653 enters Upper Turkeyfoot Township in Somerset County and becomes Scullton Road, passing through more woodland with some farmland and homes, turning to the southeast. The road heads through wooded areas of housing development before entering an area with a mix of farms and woods with some residences. Passing through Scullton, it then crosses into Middlecreek Township.

The route winds east through more rural areas, crossing the Laurel Hill Creek and heading into open agricultural areas, intersecting PA 281 in the residential community of New Lexington. At this point, PA 281 turns east to form a concurrency with PA 653, passing through more farmland on Kingwood Road. The road heads into wooded areas, crossing the Middle Creek into Milford Township and turning northeast.

The two routes head into more agricultural land and cross into the borough of New Centerville, passing homes. PA 653 splits from PA 281 by turning south onto Bridge Street and running through more residential areas. The road crosses back into Milford Township and heads southeast through open farmland with some woods and homes. The route enters the borough of Rockwood and heads into residential areas, turning south. PA 653 turns east onto Main Street and passes more homes along with a few businesses, turning northeast. The route heads back into Milford Township and turns east onto Galico Road, with Main Street continuing north.

PA 653 crosses Coxes Creek into Black Township and crosses over CSX's S&C Subdivision railroad line, heading southeast through wooded areas with some homes before turning northeast through open farmland. The route turns southeast onto Garrett Road, running through more open agricultural areas with some homes. PA 653 continues into a mix of farmland and woodland with some residences, crossing into Summit Township.

Farther southeast, the road heads through more wooded areas, curving south into the borough of Garrett and becoming Jackson Street. PA 653 curves to the southeast through areas of homes and businesses, ending at an intersection with Mason Dixon Highway / SR 2047 (former US 219).

== Major intersections ==
County	Location	mi	km	Destinations	Notes
Fayette	Springfield Township	0.000	0.000	PA 381 (Mill Run Road)	Western terminus; to PA 711
Somerset	Middlecreek Township	13.096	21.076	PA 281 south (Kingwood Road) – Addison	West end of PA 281 concurrency
Somerset	New Centerville	15.883	25.561	PA 281 north (Main Street) – Somerset, Trent	East end of PA 281 concurrency
Somerset	Garrett	26.428	42.532	SR 2047 (Mason Dixon Highway) – Somerset, Meyersdale	Eastern terminus; formerly US 219
1.000 mi = 1.609 km; 1.000 km = 0.621 mi: Concurrency terminus

== PA 653 Truck ==
Pennsylvania Route 653 Truck
- Location: Rockwood, Pennsylvania
- Length: 1.4 mi (2.3 km)

Pennsylvania Route 653 Truck was a 1.4 mi (2.3 km) truck route east of Rockwood. The highway was created to bypass a bridge over Coxes Creek. Although the structure was replaced in 1999, the route remained signed until 2011. The road deviated from its parent by heading north along Water Level Road. The route made a turn southeast and then crossed the creek before rejoining PA 653 after travelling along SR 3019.
