= Pennsylvania Route 281 =

State highway in Pennsylvania, US

Pennsylvania Route 281

Route information
- Maintained by Henry Clay Township and PennDOT
- Length: 45.8 mi (73.7 km)
- Existed: 1928–present

Major junctions
- South end: WV 26 at the West Virginia state line near Markleysburg
- US 40 near Markleysburg; PA 523 in Confluence; PA 653 from New Lexington to New Centerville; PA 31 in Somerset; PA 601 in Somerset; US 219 in Somerset Township
- North end: US 30 in Stoystown

Location
- Country: United States
- State: Pennsylvania
- Counties: Fayette, Somerset

Highway system
- Pennsylvania State Route System; Interstate; US; State; Scenic; Legislative
← PA 280	→ PA 282

Pennsylvania Route 281 (PA 281) is a 45.8-mile-long (73.7 km) state highway located in Fayette and Somerset counties in Pennsylvania. The southern terminus is the West Virginia state line near Markleysburg, where the road becomes West Virginia Route 26 (WV 26). The northern terminus is at U.S. Route 30 (US 30) in Stoystown.

== Route description ==
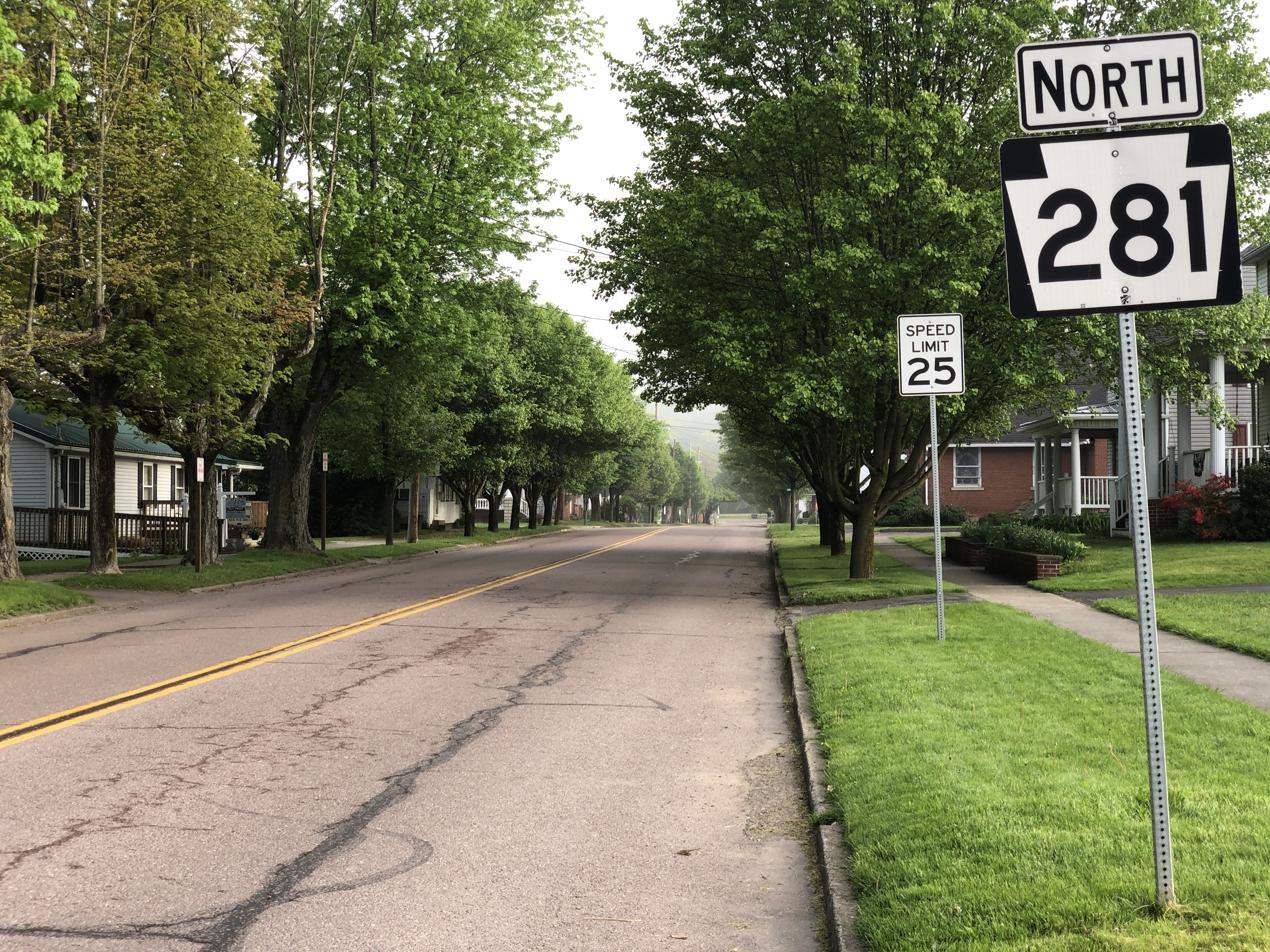
PA 281 northbound past PA 523 in Confluence

PA 281 begins at the West Virginia border in Henry Clay Township, Fayette County, where the road continues into that state as WV 26. From the state line, the route heads northeast on the township maintained, two-lane undivided Bruceton Road, heading through wooded areas with some fields and homes. PA 281 curves to the east and crosses into the borough of Markleysburg, where state maintenance begins and it heads into residential areas. PA 281 turns north-northeast onto Main Street where it passes more homes before heading back into Henry Clay Township and continues through woodland with a few small fields and residences. The route comes to an intersection with US 40 and turns east to form a short concurrency with that route on National Pike before turning north onto Mae West Road. PA 281 continues through rural areas with some homes, winding to the northeast before turning east.

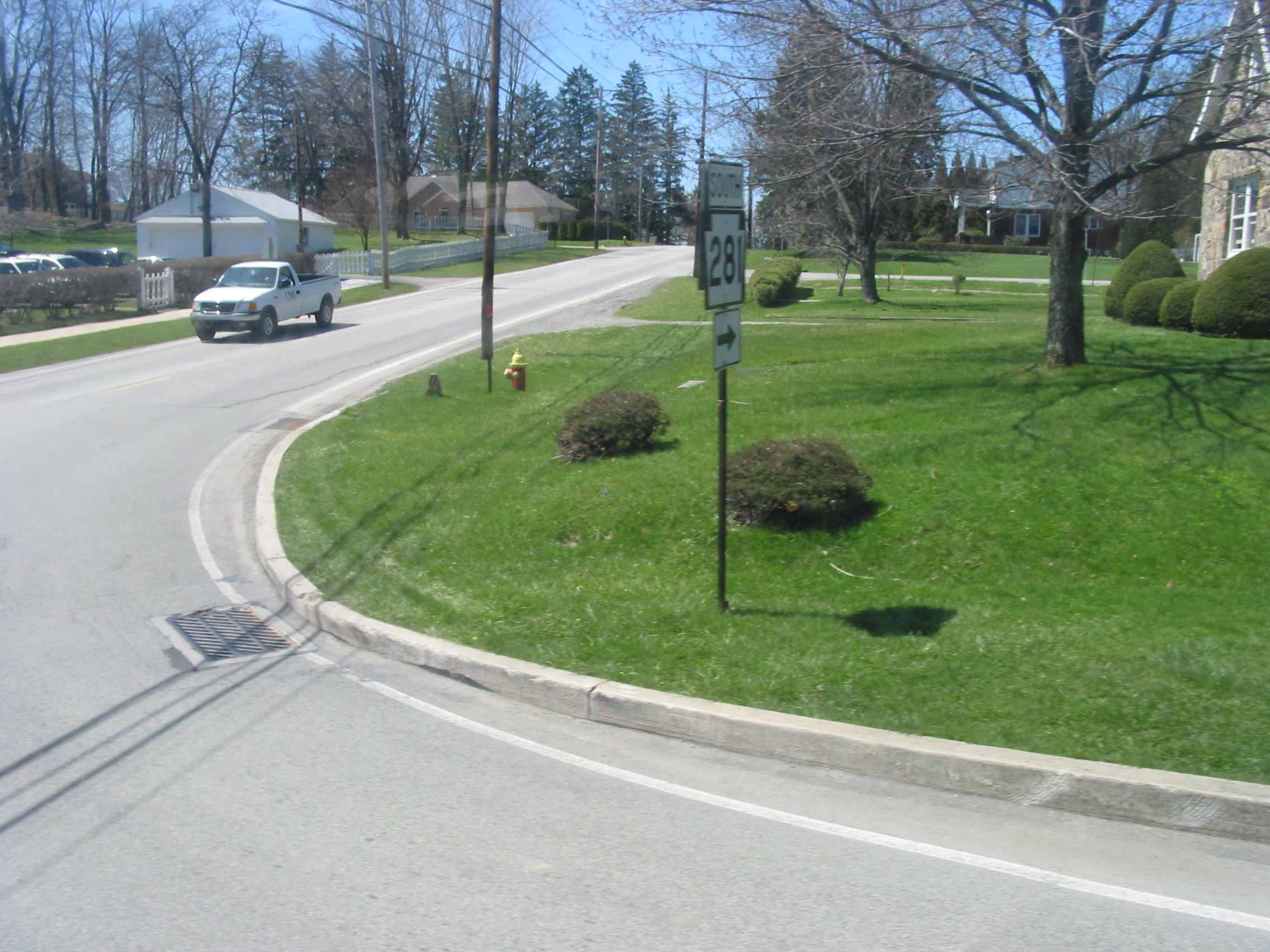
PA 281 south viewed from PA 31 east in Somerset

PA 281 crosses the Youghiogheny River into Addison Township in Somerset County and becomes an unnamed road, heading into the borough of Confluence and crossing the Casselman River. Here, the route comes to an intersection with PA 523. At this point, PA 281 turns north to form a concurrency with that route on Oden Street, passing residences. PA 523 ends at the point where PA 281 turns to the east onto Logan Place. The route heads past businesses before turning northeast onto Park Street and passing under CSX's Keystone Subdivision railroad line. The road turns east and crosses Laurel Hill Creek, passing between woods to the north and fields to the south as it enters Lower Turkeyfoot Township. A short distance later, PA 281 heads into the borough of Ursina and passes through residential areas with some fields and trees. The road curves northeast and heads back into Lower Turkeyfoot Township, becoming Kingwood Road and crossing Laurel Hill Creek again. The route winds through a mix of farmland and woodland with some homes as it runs a short distance to the north of the CSX railroad line, passing through Brook. PA 281 continues into Upper Turkeyfoot Township and heads away from the railroad tracks, running through open agricultural areas with some woods and homes as it goes through Paddytown. The road curves more to the north and heads through more rural areas, passing through the residential community of Kingwood. The route continues northeast and heads into Middlecreek Township, curving north and intersecting PA 653 in New Lexington. At this point, PA 281 turns east to form a concurrency with PA 653, passing through more farmland on Kingwood Road. The road heads into wooded areas, crossing the Middle Creek into Milford Township and turning northeast. The two routes head into more agricultural land and cross into the borough of New Centerville, passing homes. PA 653 splits from PA 281 by turning south onto Bridge Street and PA 281 runs through more residential areas on New Centerville Road. The road curves north and heads back into Milford Township, running through open farmland. The route runs northeast through more agricultural areas with some trees and homes, crossing into Somerset Township.

PA 281 continues through more rural areas, entering the borough of Somerset and becoming Tayman Avenue as it passes homes. At the Harrison Avenue intersection, PA 281 becomes a one-way pair concurrent with PA 31, heading east on Tayman Avenue northbound and west on West Main Street southbound, carrying two lanes in each direction. The one-way pairing becomes West Patriot Street northbound and West Main Street southbound as it heads into the commercial downtown of Somerset. PA 31/PA 281 intersect the southern terminus of PA 601, becoming East Patriot Street northbound and East Main Street southbound. PA 281 splits from PA 31 by turning north onto two-way, two-lane, undivided North Pleasant Avenue, passing between homes to the west and CSX's S&C Subdivision railroad line to the east. The route becomes the border between Somerset to the west and Somerset Township to the east, turning northeast onto Stoystown Road to fully enter Somerset Township and cross the railroad tracks (Pleasant Avenue continues north to provide direct access to PA 601 and the Pennsylvania Turnpike). The road passes through residential areas as it crosses under Interstate 70 (I-70)/I-76 (Pennsylvania Turnpike). PA 281 passes through farmland and woodland with some homes and businesses as it comes to an interchange with the US 219 freeway, becoming a divided highway at this point. Past this interchange, the road becomes undivided again and continues through more rural areas with residences, crossing the CSX line again. The route passes to the northwest of Somerset County Airport and runs through the residential community of Friedens. The road enters Quemahoning Township and runs through farmland with some woods and homes, turning north into more wooded areas and passing through Reading Mines. PA 281 continues north to its terminus at an interchange with US 30, where the road heads north into the borough of Stoystown as East Main Street.

== Major intersections ==
County	Location	mi	km	Destinations	Notes
Fayette	Henry Clay Township	0.000	0.000	WV 26 south – Morgantown	Continuation beyond West Virginia state line
Fayette	Henry Clay Township	3.976	6.399	US 40 west (National Pike) – Uniontown	Southern end of concurrency with US 40
Fayette	Henry Clay Township	4.208	6.772	US 40 east (National Pike) – Cumberland	Northern end of concurrency with US 40
Somerset	Confluence	11.896	19.145	PA 523 south (Oden Street) / Casselman Street – Harnedsville	Southern end of concurrency with PA 523
Somerset	Confluence	12.209	19.648	PA 523 ends / Logan Place / Hugart Street	Northern end of concurrency with PA 523; northern terminus of PA 523
Somerset	Middlecreek Township	25.044	40.304	PA 653 west (Scullton Road) – Connellsville	Southern end of concurrency with PA 653
Somerset	New Centerville	27.831	44.790	PA 653 east (Bridge Street) – Garrett, Rockwood	Northern end of concurrency with PA 653
Somerset	Somerset	35.348	56.887	PA 31 west (Harrison Avenue)	Southern end of concurrency with PA 31 on one-way pairs
Somerset	Somerset	36.073	58.054	PA 601 north (Center Avenue) to US 219	Southern terminus of PA 601
Somerset	Somerset	36.354	58.506	PA 31 east (East Main Street) to US 219 south – Berlin	Northern end of concurrency with PA 31 on one-way pairs
Somerset	Somerset	36.607	58.913	SR 4055 (Pleasant Avenue) to PA 601 / Penna Turnpike / Stoystown Road	
Somerset	Somerset	38.346– 38.504	61.712– 61.966	US 219 – Meyersdale, Johnstown	Interchange
Somerset	Stoystown	45.735– 45.802	73.603– 73.711	US 30 (Lincoln Highway) to PA 403 north / East Main Street (SR 4028) – Greensburg, Hooversville, Bedford	Interchange; northern terminus
1.000 mi = 1.609 km; 1.000 km = 0.621 mi: Concurrency terminus
