= Ohiopyle Highway Bridge =

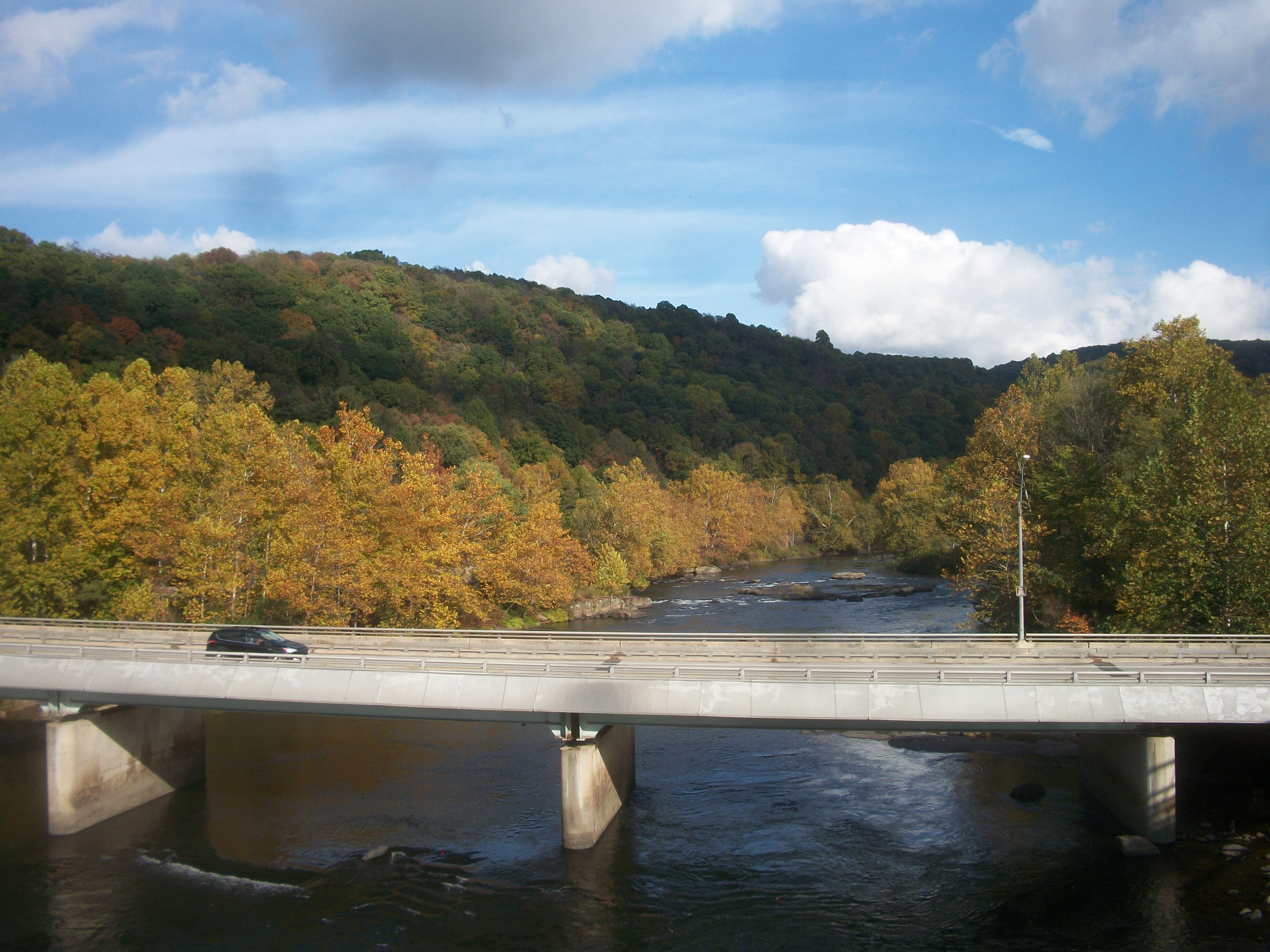
- Coordinates: 39°52′N 79°29′W
- Carries: two lanes of PA 381
- Crosses: Youghiogheny River
- Locale: Ohiopyle, Pennsylvania

Characteristics
- Design: girder bridge
- Total length: 663 feet (202 m)

History
- Opened: 1976

Location
- Interactive map of Ohiopyle Highway Bridge

The Ohiopyle Highway Bridge is a structure that carries two lanes of Pennsylvania Route 381 over the Youghiogheny River in Ohiopyle, Pennsylvania, United States.

The span, which opened in 1975, is the third to be located in the vicinity. An original 19th-century covered bridge was replaced by a Pratt truss bridge around 1900. Because of a low-clearance underpass located directly adjacent to its southern approach, this structure proved to be obsolete once the automobile replaced the train as the primary method of tourism in the years following World War II. Although already scheduled for replacement, the discovery of a major fatigue crack sealed the fate of this structure, leading the way for the present girder bridge to be erected.

== See also ==
- List of crossings of the Youghiogheny River
