= Uniontown Area School District =

School district in Pennsylvania

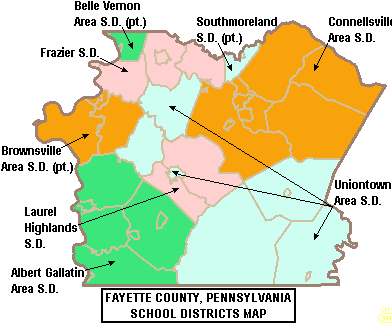

Address
- 205 Wilson Avenue (Central Administration Office) Uniontown, Pennsylvania, 15401; United States

District information
- Type: Public

Students and staff
- District mascot: Red Raiders
- Colors: Maroon and White

Other information
- Website: uasdraiders.org

Uniontown Area School District is a highly fragmented midsized, rural public school district located in Fayette County, Pennsylvania. It serves the city of Uniontown and the boroughs of Ohiopyle, and Markleysburg. It also serves Wharton, Henry Clay, Menallen, Franklin, and Stewart townships. The district encompasses approximately 250 square miles. Based on 2000 federal census data, the district serves a resident population of 26,925. In 2009, the district residents’ per capita income was $14,621, while the median family income was $33,750. In the Commonwealth, the median family income was $49,501 and the United States median family income was $49,445, in 2010.

== Schools ==
School name	Grade Level	Principal
A.J. McMullen Middle School	Grades 6–8	Tracy Holesapple
Ben Franklin School	Grades K-8	Rachel Rollings
Franklin School	Grades K-6	Joseph Galie
Lafayette School	Grades K-8	Lauren Clemmer
Marclay School	Grades K-5	Tracy Holesapple
Menallen School	Grades K-6	Joseph Galie
Wharton School	Grades K-6	Tracy Holesapple
Uniontown Area High School	Grades 9–12	Co-principals: Heather Sefcheck and Robert Manges

== Extracurriculars ==
The district offers a variety of clubs, activities and sports.

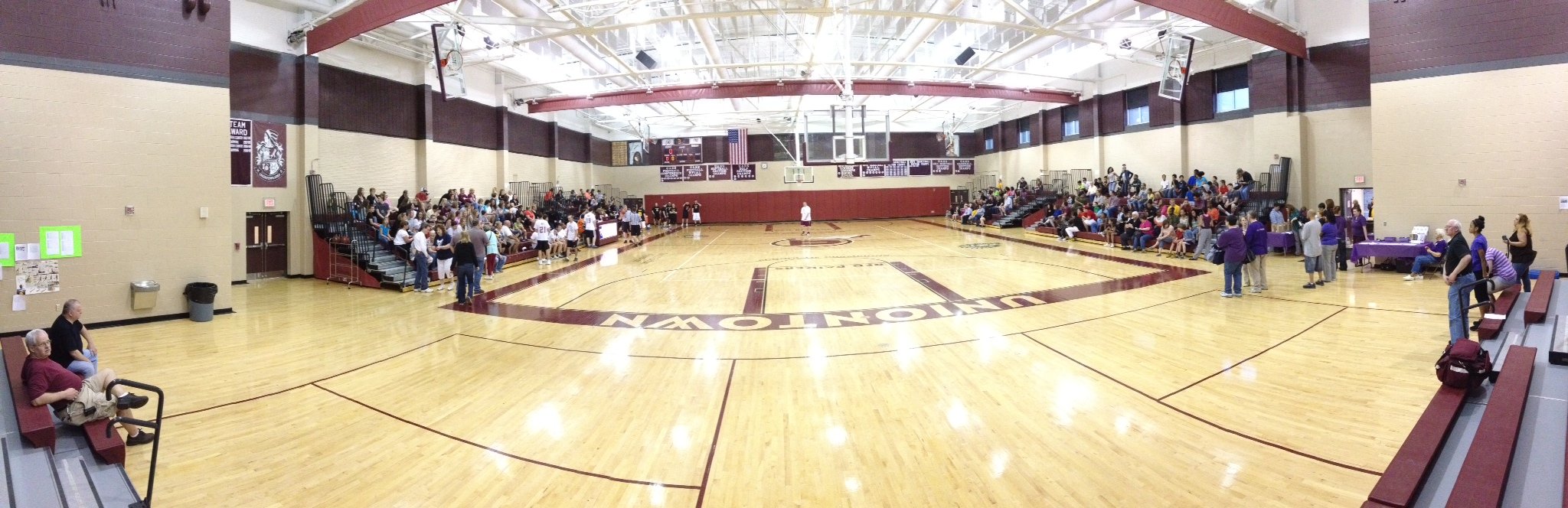
A. J. Everhart, Jr. Memorial Gymnasium - Uniontown Area Senior High School on April 11, 2013, during a fundraiser to benefit the Domestic Violence Services of Southwestern Pennsylvania. The Uniontown Faculty team (white) hosted the Brownsville faculty team (black).
