= Normalville, Pennsylvania =

Unincorporated community in Pennsylvania, US

- Unincorporated community
- Location within Pennsylvania
- Coordinates: 39°59′55″N 79°26′53″W
- Country: United States
- State: Pennsylvania
- County: Fayette
- Elevation: 1,676 ft (511 m)
- Time zone: UTC-5 (Eastern (EST))
  - Summer (DST): UTC-4 (EDT)
- ZIP code: 15469
- Area codes: 724, 878
- GNIS feature ID: 1182503

Normalville is an unincorporated community in Fayette County, Pennsylvania, United States. The community is located along state routes 381 and 711, 7.6 miles (12.2 km) east of Connellsville. Normalville has a post office with ZIP code 15469, which opened on January 18, 1853.
