= New Centerville, Pennsylvania =

Borough in Pennsylvania, US

- Borough
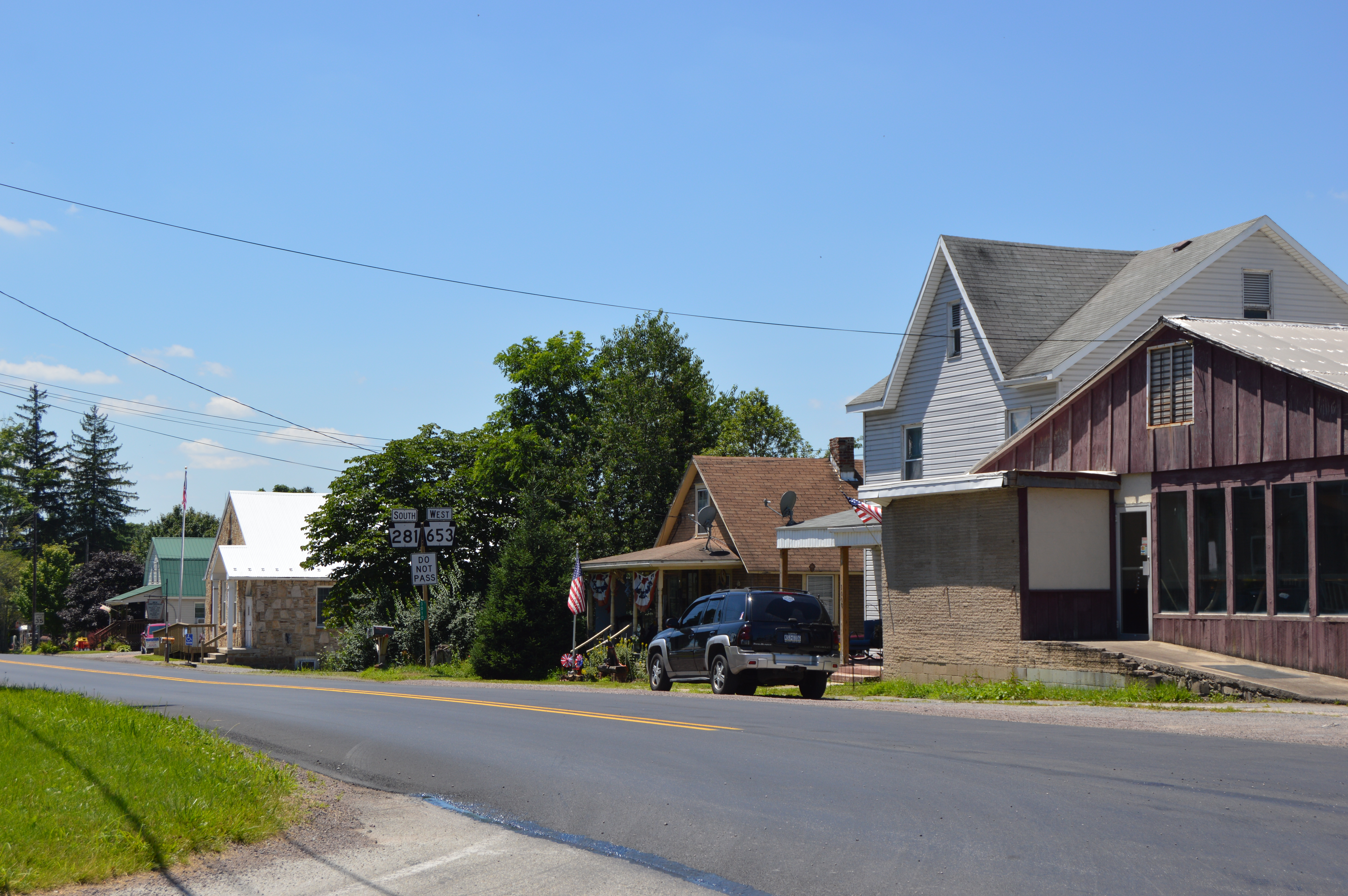
- Kingwood Road (Pennsylvania Routes 281/653)

- Location of New Centerville in Somerset County, Pennsylvania.
- Coordinates: 39°56′30″N 79°11′31″W
- Country: United States
- State: Pennsylvania
- County: Somerset
- Settled: 1834
- Incorporated: March 6, 1854

Government
  - Type: Borough Council

Area
  - Total: 0.14 sq mi (0.37 km^{2})
  - Land: 0.14 sq mi (0.37 km^{2})
  - Water: 0 sq mi (0.00 km^{2})

Population (2020)
  - Total: 128
  - Density: 900.2/sq mi (347.58/km^{2})
- Time zone: UTC-5 (Eastern (EST))
  - Summer (DST): UTC-4 (EDT)
- Area code: 814
- FIPS code: 42-53416

New Centerville is a borough in Somerset County, Pennsylvania, United States. The population was 127 at the 2020 census. It is part of the Johnstown, Pennsylvania, Metropolitan Statistical Area. It should not be confused with the unincorporated village of New Centerville in Tredyffrin Township.

== Geography ==
New Centerville is located at 39°56′30″N 79°11′31″W (39.941712, −79.192047) and is surrounded by Milford Township. According to the United States Census Bureau, the borough has a total area of 0.3 square miles (0.78 km^{2}), all land. Pennsylvania Route 281 and Pennsylvania Route 653 both pass through New Centerville. From New Lexington to New Centerville, they form a concurrency; in New Centerville, Route 653 splits off and runs southeastward to the borough of Rockwood while Route 281 continues northeast to the borough of Somerset.

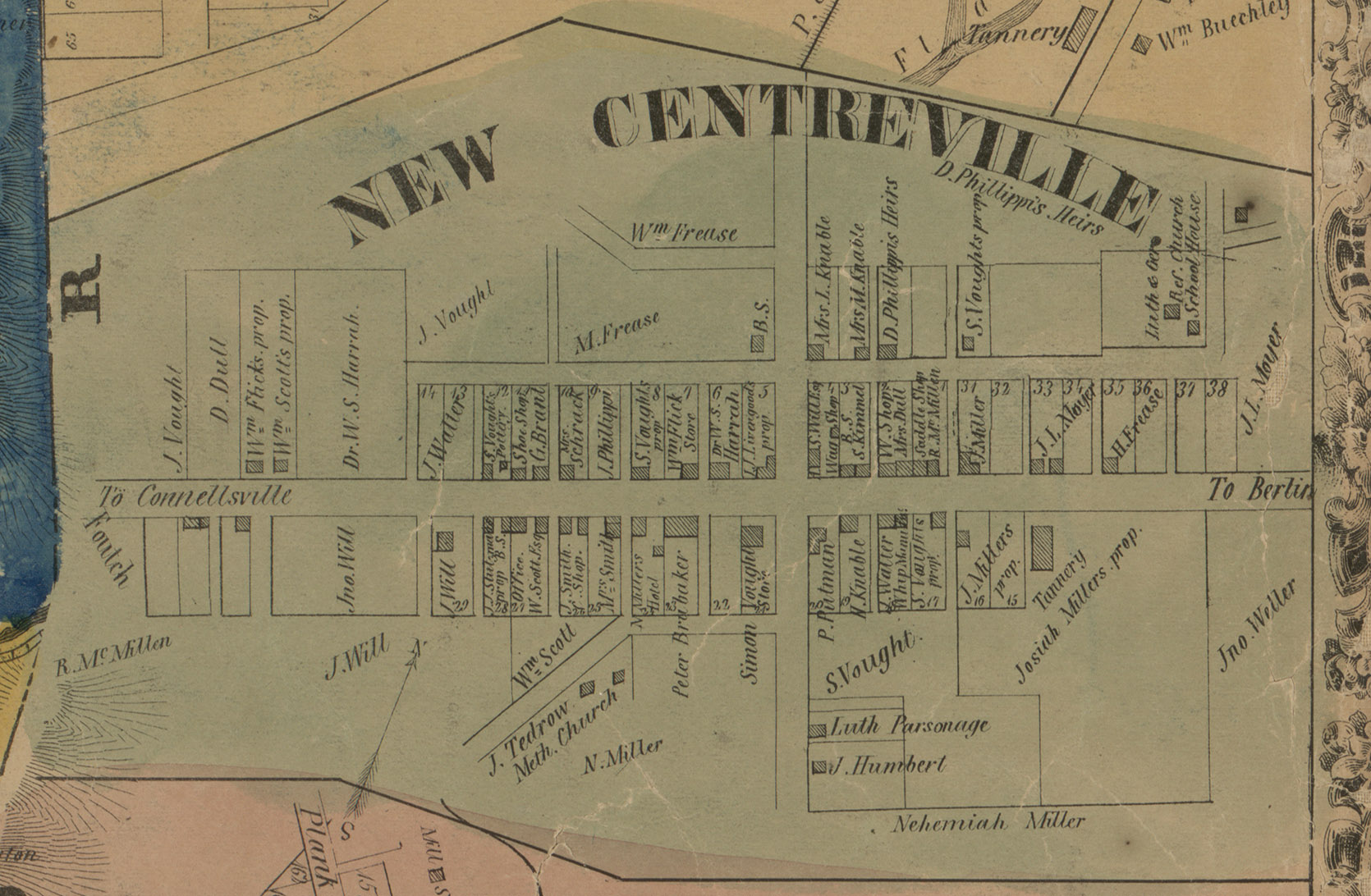
New Centreville, Somerset County, Pennsylvania, 1860

== History ==
A schoolhouse was built in what is now New Centerville about 1800, and Jacob Weimer taught there for several years. A church was built about 1813 and was shared by the Lutherans and the Presbyterians, and the Methodists built one about 1850. Michael Freeze arrived in the vicinity of New Centerville in 1830 and laid out the town in 1834. A tannery was built around 1840 by Josiah Miller. New Centerville was incorporated as a borough on March 6, 1854.

== Demographics ==
Historical population
Census	Pop.	Note	%±
1860	154		—
1870	196		27.3%
1880	140		−28.6%
1890	104		−25.7%
1900	105		1.0%
1910	106		1.0%
1920	104		−1.9%
1930	138		32.7%
1940	144		4.3%
1950	145		0.7%
1960	198		36.6%
1970	253		27.8%
1980	213		−15.8%
1990	211		−0.9%
2000	193		−8.5%
2010	133		−31.1%
2020	128		−3.8%
2021 (est.)	126	▼	−1.6%

As of the census of 2000, there were 193 people, 85 households, and 61 families residing in the borough. The population density was 686.0 inhabitants per square mile (264.9/km^{2}). There were 86 housing units at an average density of 305.7 per square mile (118.0/km^{2}). The racial makeup of the borough was 98.45% White, 1.04% African American and 0.52% Asian. Hispanic or Latino of any race were 1.04% of the population.

There were 85 households, out of which 29.4% had children under the age of 18 living with them, 67.1% were married couples living together, 4.7% had a female householder with no husband present, and 27.1% were non-families. 25.9% of all households were made up of individuals, and 15.3% had someone living alone who was 65 years of age or older. The average household size was 2.27 and the average family size was 2.71.

In the borough the population was spread out, with 20.2% under the age of 18, 2.1% from 18 to 24, 28.0% from 25 to 44, 25.9% from 45 to 64, and 23.8% who were 65 years of age or older. The median age was 45 years. For every 100 females there were 83.8 males. For every 100 females age 18 and over, there were 85.5 males.

The median income for a household in the borough was $37,750, and the median income for a family was $45,833. Males had a median income of $35,625 versus $19,167 for females. The per capita income for the borough was $21,873. None of the families and 5.5% of the population were living below the poverty line, including no under eighteens and 16.1% of those over 64.

== Culture ==
Each September, the New Centerville & Rural Volunteer Fire Company sponsors the Farmers & Threshermens Jubilee. This multi-day festival highlights the role that traction steam engines played in early 20th century agriculture and includes activities such as a parade, threshing machine demonstrations, antique tractor displays, and tractor & truck pulling. Also on the Jubilee grounds is an 800 horsepower Chicago Pneumatic diesel engine that had provided electricity for the town of Blackstone, Virginia, in the mid-20th century; it was added to the Jubilee's displays in 1983.
