= Garrett, Pennsylvania =

Borough in Pennsylvania, US

- Borough
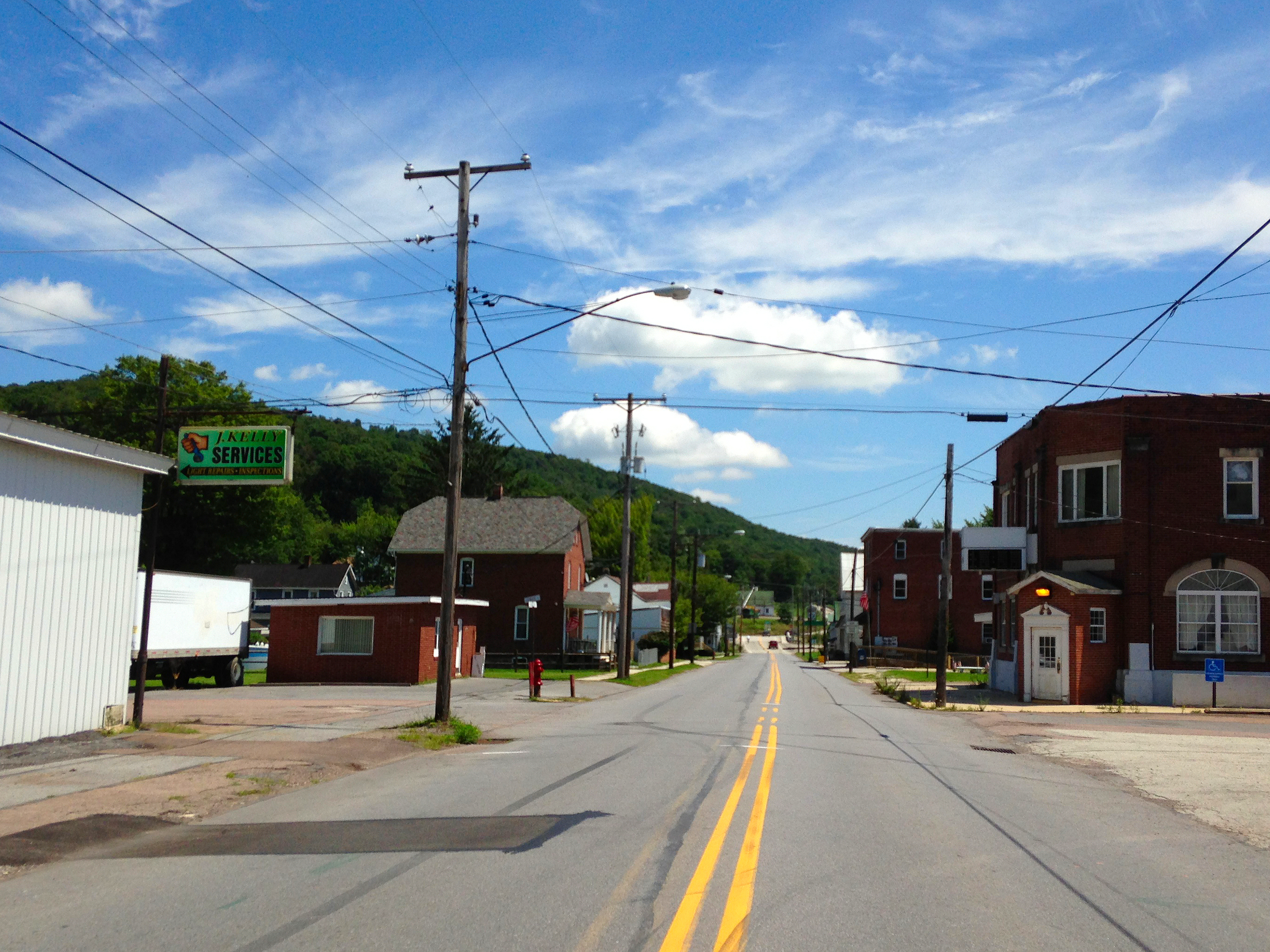
- Garrett looking east on PA 653 (Jackson Street) in 2014
- Motto(s): The Town that goes on and on
- Location of Garrett in Somerset County, Pennsylvania

- Location within Pennsylvania
- Coordinates: 39°51′49″N 79°03′40″W
- Country: United States
- State: Pennsylvania
- County: Somerset
- Settled: 1869
- Incorporated: 1900

Government
  - Type: Borough Council

Area
  - Total: 0.51 sq mi (1.31 km^{2})
  - Land: 0.51 sq mi (1.31 km^{2})
  - Water: 0 sq mi (0.00 km^{2})

Population (2020)
  - Total: 415
  - Density: 820.7/sq mi (316.88/km^{2})
- Time zone: UTC-5 (Eastern (EST))
  - Summer (DST): UTC-4 (EDT)
- Zip Code: 15542
- Area code: 814
- FIPS code: 42-28520

Garrett is a borough in Somerset County, Pennsylvania, United States. It is part of the Johnstown, Pennsylvania, Metropolitan Statistical Area. The population was 416 at the 2020 census.

== History ==
Garrett was first settled in 1869 and was incorporated in 1900. Garrett is named for the president of the Baltimore and Ohio Railroad John Work Garrett. John W. Garrett served as president of the Baltimore and Ohio Railroad from 1858 to 1884 and was born in Baltimore, Maryland, on July 31, 1820. He was the second son of Elizabeth Stouffer and Robert Garrett. He married Rachel Ann Harrison, the daughter of Thomas Harrison, a Baltimore merchant. They had one daughter, Mary and two sons, Robert and Thomas Harrison Garrett.

During the height of the Baltimore & Ohio Railroad, Garrett served as the junction of its Pittsburgh Division with its Berlin branch. The Berlin Branch Railroad was originally built by the Buffalo Valley Railroad Company in 1871. This 8.5 mile branch line connected Berlin to the main B&O line (also known as the Pittsburgh & Connellsville Railroad) as it passed through Garrett, and it was taken over by the B&O itself in 1880. There were seven stations located along the Berlin branch as it ran northeast along the Buffalo Creek valley: Garrett, Burkholder, Buchle, Bitner, Pine Hill, Hanger's, and Berlin. A view of Garrett appeared in a collection of photographs from along the B&O's lines that was published in book form in 1872 and digitized by the DeGolyer Library, Southern Methodist University.

The Western Maryland Railroad ran in an East to West direction on the Brooklyn side of Garrett. It is the current site of the Great Allegheny Passage. A 150-mile system of biking and hiking trails connecting Cumberland, Maryland and Pittsburgh that was constructed on the former Western Maryland railroad bed. The Connellsville Extension of the Western Maryland Railroad was built west from Cumberland, Maryland, to Connellsville, Pennsylvania, beginning around 1906 and was completed in 1912.

In 1964, the Chesapeake and Ohio Railway (C&O) and the Baltimore and Ohio Railroad (B&O) jointly filed for permission to acquire control of the Western Maryland Railway with the Interstate Commerce Commission (ICC). In 1973, as part of the Chessie System, the Western Maryland ownership went to C&O and it was operated by the B&O. In 1987, it was merged into the C&O which itself became part of CSX Transportation.

== Geography ==
Garrett is located at 39°51′49″N 79°3′40″W (39.863563, -79.061159). According to the United States Census Bureau, the borough has a total area of 0.7 square miles (1.8 km^{2}), all land. Garrett is located along Summit Township's border with Brothersvalley Township.

Garrett sits at the confluence of the Buffalo Creek and the Casselman River. The Casselman River is believed to be named for the Landgraviate of Hesse-Kassel or Hesse-Cassel in Germany. An imperial immediacy (German: Reichsfreiheit or Reichsunmittelbarkeit) which was a privileged feudal and political status, a form of statehood, which a city, religious entity or feudal principality of minor lordship could attain within the Holy Roman Empire.

== Transportation ==
The eastern terminus of Pennsylvania Route 653 is at the Mason Dixon Highway in Garrett; from there, Pennsylvania Route 653 runs northwest to Rockwood.

== Demographics ==
Historical population
Census	Pop.	Note	%±
1880	253		—
1900	488		—
1910	848		73.8%
1920	850		0.2%
1930	878		3.3%
1940	872		−0.7%
1950	761		−12.7%
1960	617		−18.9%
1970	616		−0.2%
1980	563		−8.6%
1990	520		−7.6%
2000	449		−13.7%
2010	456		1.6%
2020	415		−9.0%
2021 (est.)	413	▼	−0.5%

As of the census of 2000, there were 449 people, 168 households, and 128 families residing in the borough. The population density was 606.3 inhabitants per square mile (234.1/km^{2}). There were 180 housing units at an average density of 243.0 per square mile (93.8/km^{2}). The racial makeup of the borough was 99.55% White, and 0.45% from two or more races.

There were 168 households, out of which 33.3% had children under the age of 18 living with them, 61.3% were married couples living together, 10.7% had a female householder with no husband present, and 23.8% were non-families. 21.4% of all households were made up of individuals, and 12.5% had someone living alone who was 65 years of age or older. The average household size was 2.67 and the average family size was 3.07.

In the borough the population was spread out, with 26.9% under the age of 18, 10.0% from 18 to 24, 26.5% from 25 to 44, 20.0% from 45 to 64, and 16.5% who were 65 years of age or older. The median age was 34 years. For every 100 females there were 98.7 males. For every 100 females age 18 and over, there were 91.8 males.

The median income for a household in the borough was $24,609, and the median income for a family was $27,375. Males had a median income of $23,542 versus $15,625 for females. The per capita income for the borough was $10,935. About 12.1% of families and 15.8% of the population were below the poverty line, including 17.3% of those under age 18 and 15.3% of those age 65 or over.

Notable landmarks in Garrett include a 10 MW wind farm, the first large-scale wind facility constructed in the eastern U.S.

== See also ==
- List of boroughs in Pennsylvania
