= Markleysburg, Pennsylvania =

Borough in Pennsylvania, US

- Borough
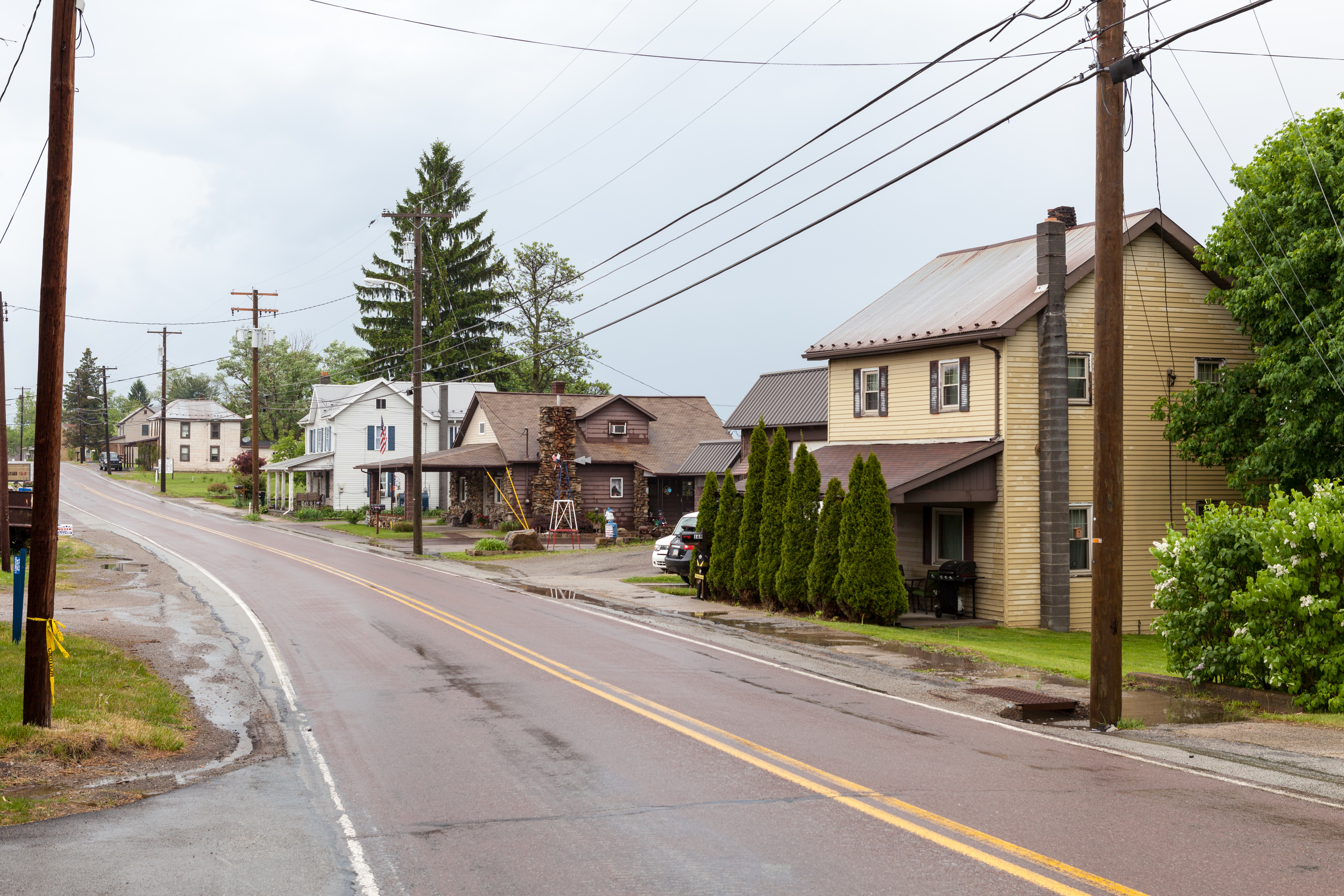
- Looking northeast on Main Street

- Location of Markleysburg in Fayette County, Pennsylvania.

- Location in Pennsylvania Markleysburg (the United States)
- Coordinates: 39°44′14″N 79°27′11″W
- Country: United States
- State: Pennsylvania
- County: Fayette
- Established: 1860

Government
  - Mayor: Elijah Holp

Area
  - Total: 0.30 sq mi (0.77 km^{2})
  - Land: 0.30 sq mi (0.77 km^{2})
  - Water: 0 sq mi (0.00 km^{2})
- Elevation: 2,032 ft (619 m)

Population (2020)
  - Total: 246
  - Density: 827.9/sq mi (319.67/km^{2})
- Time zone: UTC-4 (EST)
  - Summer (DST): UTC-5 (EDT)
- ZIP codes: 15459
- Area code: 724
- FIPS code: 42-47560
- Website: markleysburg.pa.us

Markleysburg is a borough in Fayette County, Pennsylvania, United States. The population was 246 at the 2020 census. The borough is served by the Uniontown Area School District.

== Geography ==
Markleysburg is located in southeastern Fayette County at 39°44′14″N 79°27′10″W (39.737178, −79.452646). Pennsylvania Route 281 passes through the borough as Main Street; it leads north 1.5 miles (2.4 km) to U.S. Route 40 (the National Pike) and southwest 2 miles (3 km) to the West Virginia border. The Maryland border is 1 mile (1.6 km) south of Markleysburg via Friendsville Road.

According to the United States Census Bureau, the borough has a total area of 0.30 square miles (0.78 km^{2}), all land.

== Demographics ==
Historical population
Census	Pop.	Note	%±
1880	77		—
1900	210		—
1910	227		8.1%
1920	191		−15.9%
1930	203		6.3%
1940	297		46.3%
1950	291		−2.0%
1960	345		18.6%
1970	367		6.4%
1980	356		−3.0%
1990	320		−10.1%
2000	282		−11.9%
2010	284		0.7%
2020	246		−13.4%
2021 (est.)	244	▼	−0.8%

As of the 2000 census, there were 282 people, 90 households, and 68 families residing in the borough. The population density was 989.3 inhabitants per square mile (382.0/km^{2}). There were 105 housing units at an average density of 368.3 per square mile (142.2/km^{2}). The racial makeup of the borough was 98.23% White and 1.77% African American.

There were 90 households, out of which 33.3% had children under the age of 18 living with them, 64.4% were married couples living together, 6.7% had a female householder with no husband present, and 24.4% were non-families. 23.3% of all households were made up of individuals, and 14.4% had someone living alone who was 65 years of age or older. The average household size was 2.60 and the average family size was 3.10.

In the borough the population was spread out, with 23.8% under the age of 18, 5.0% from 18 to 24, 21.6% from 25 to 44, 20.2% from 45 to 64, and 29.4% who were 65 years of age or older. The median age was 45 years. For every 100 females, there were 91.8 males. For every 100 females age 18 and over, there were 87.0 males.

The median income for a household in the borough was $22,083, and the median income for a family was $29,063. Males had a median income of $25,000 versus $15,625 for females. The per capita income for the borough was $12,312. About 21.3% of families and 21.5% of the population were below the poverty line, including 31.7% of those under the age of eighteen and 16.3% of those sixty five or over.
