= Indian Creek (Youghiogheny River tributary) =

Stream in Pennsylvania, USA

Indian Creek Tributary to Youghiogheny River
- Location of Indian Creek mouth Indian Creek (Youghiogheny River tributary) (the United States)

Location
- Country: United States
- State: Pennsylvania
- County: Fayette; Westmoreland

Physical characteristics
- Source: Shafer Run and Loyalhanna Creek divide
  - location: about 5 miles southeast of Kregar, Pennsylvania
  - coordinates: 40°06′24″N 079°13′38″W
  - elevation: 2,560 ft (780 m)
- Mouth: Youghiogheny River
  - location: Indian Creek, Pennsylvania
  - coordinates: 39°58′05″N 079°30′46″W
  - elevation: 945 ft (288 m)
- Length: 29.55 mi (47.56 km)
- Basin size: 124.88 square miles (323.4 km^{2})
- Discharge
  - location: Youghiogheny River
  - average: 228.94 cu ft/s (6.483 m^{3}/s) at mouth with Youghiogheny River

Basin features
- Progression: generally southwest
- River system: Monongahela River
- Tributaries
  - left: Little Run; Camp Run; Roaring Run; Back Creek; Laurel Run; Mill Run
  - right: Champion Creek; Wash Run; Poplar Run; Rasler Run; Richter Run; Tates Run
- Waterbodies: Mill Run Reservoir

Indian Creek is a 31.0-mile-long (49.9 km) tributary of the Youghiogheny River in Fayette County, Pennsylvania in the United States.

Indian Creek drains the west slope of Laurel Hill in the Laurel Highlands and cuts a steep side canyon into the Youghiogheny Gorge to join the Youghiogheny River between Ohiopyle and Connellsville.

== See also ==
- List of rivers of Pennsylvania
