= Ohiopyle, Pennsylvania =

Borough in Pennsylvania, United States

- Borough
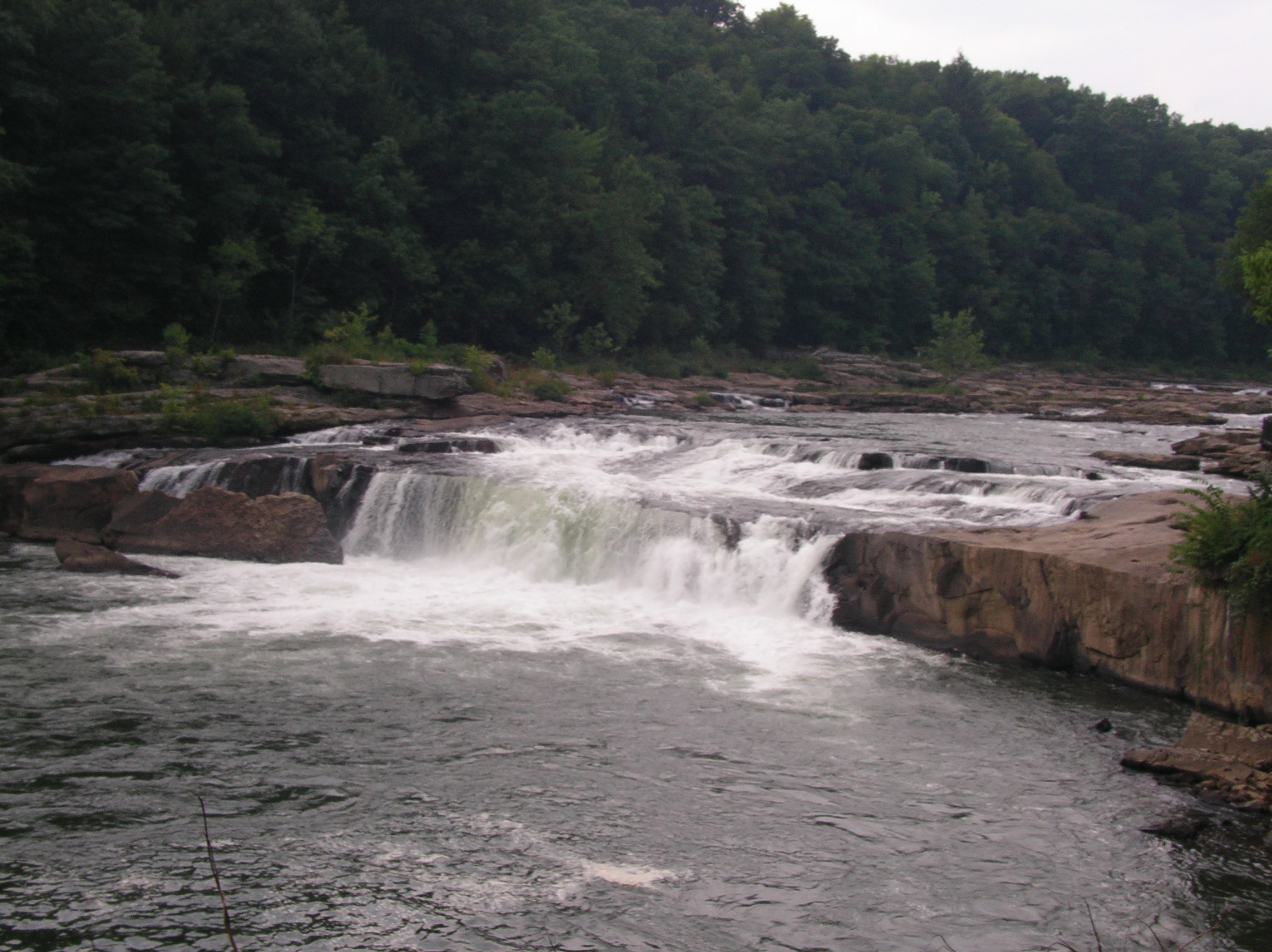
- Ohiopyle Falls on the Youghiogheny River

- Seal
- Etymology: Lenape ahi opihəle, "it turns very white"
- Location in Fayette County, Pennsylvania

- Location in Pennsylvania Location in the United States
- Coordinates: 39°52′5″N 79°29′35″W
- Country: United States
- State: Pennsylvania
- County: Fayette
- Established: 1868

Government
  - Mayor: Mark McCarty

Area
  - Total: 0.50 sq mi (1.29 km^{2})
  - Land: 0.42 sq mi (1.08 km^{2})
  - Water: 0.081 sq mi (0.21 km^{2})

Population (2020)
  - Total: 37
  - Density: 88.5/sq mi (34.18/km^{2})
- Time zone: UTC-5 (EST)
  - Summer (DST): UTC-4 (EDT)
- Area code: 724
- FIPS code: 42-56408
- Website: https://www.ohiopyleborough.org/

Ohiopyle is a borough in Fayette County, Pennsylvania, United States. The population was 38 at the 2020 census. While Ohiopyle has a tiny year-round population, it is often filled with tourists on the weekend, who come for the outdoor recreation opportunities at the surrounding Ohiopyle State Park, as well as the Great Allegheny Passage bicycle trail, which connects with the Chesapeake and Ohio Canal towpath trail to form a continuous 335-mile off-road trail from Pittsburgh, Pennsylvania, to Washington, D.C. The borough of Ohiopyle is served by the Uniontown Area School District.

== History ==
=== Native Americans ===
The first known group of people to inhabit the Ohiopyle area were the Monongahela, a clan of the Mound Builders. These Native Americans disappeared from the scene just as European colonists were beginning to arrive in North America. As the east coast was settled, the Native Americans who lived closer to the Atlantic Ocean were exterminated or forced to flee to the west. Various tribes inhabited the Ohiopyle area at this time, preceding their ultimate removal following the French and Indian War. One of the few remnants of American Indian culture that can be found in the area is in the name. "Ohiopyle" is derived from the Lenape phrase ahi opihəle which means 'it turns very white', referring to the frothy waterfalls.

=== French and Indian War ===
The colonial powers of New France and the British Thirteen Colonies fought for control of the trading routes in the Ohio River Valley in what was at the time the northwestern frontier of America. The French were the first to explore the upper reaches of the Ohio and Mississippi River valleys. They built several forts in what is now western Pennsylvania, including Fort Duquesne in what is now Pittsburgh. Fort Duquesne was built on the remains of Fort Prince George, which the French had seized from the British. George Washington was sent by the colonial governor of Virginia to try to retake the all-important fort at the confluence of the Allegheny and Monongahela Rivers. He was on two expeditions that passed through the Ohiopyle area. Washington tried to use the Youghiogheny River as a means to reach Fort Duquesne quickly but was forced to abandon the river passage by the waterfalls in the Ohiopyle area. Still Washington pressed on to the Pittsburgh area. His troops encountered and routed a small party of French soldiers in the Battle of Jumonville Glen. One of these soldiers escaped to Fort Duquesne. Washington was forced to quickly build a fort to prepare for the oncoming French attack. Fort Necessity is just to the southwest of Ohiopyle State Park. The colonial forces of Washington were overwhelmed by the French and their Indian allies in the Battle of the Great Meadows at Fort Necessity. These battles are considered the opening shots of the French and Indian War which would spread to the Old World and become the Seven Years' War. The loss at Fort Necessity marked Washington's only military surrender. The British ultimately won the French and Indian war and the French were forced to leave western Pennsylvania.

=== Dispute between Virginia and Pennsylvania ===
In 1763 King George III declared the area an Indian reserve and required all European settlers to leave. The settlers refused to leave, and King George bought the land from the Iroquois in 1768. The land was claimed by both Pennsylvania and Virginia. The dispute of the territory lasted through the American Revolution and was not resolved until 1784.

=== Whiskey Rebellion ===
The Whiskey Rebellion was a major test for the new government of the United States following the Revolution. The citizens of western Pennsylvania, mostly near Washington, Pennsylvania, were not pleased with the excise tax on liquor and distilled drinks. This tax had been proposed by United States Secretary of the Treasury Alexander Hamilton, passed by Congress, and signed into law by President Washington in 1791. The tensions of the whiskey tax intensified over the next three years and in 1794 there was a state of insurrection in the area. Thirteen thousand militiamen under the direct command of George Washington were sent to put down the insurrection. They passed through the Ohiopyle area on their way to arrest the rebels. The rebels "could never be found," according to Thomas Jefferson, but the militia rounded up twenty prisoners, clearly demonstrating Federal authority in the national government. The men were imprisoned, where one died, while two were convicted of treason and sentenced to death by hanging. Washington, however, pardoned them on the grounds that one was a "simpleton" and the other "insane." The military suppression of the Whiskey Rebellion set a precedent that U.S. citizens who wished to change the law had to do so peacefully through constitutional means; otherwise, the government would meet any threats to disturb the peace with force.

=== Lumbering and tourism ===
The earliest settlers to the Ohiopyle area were farmers, trappers and hunters. The population of the area expanded after the building of the National Road in 1811. This road that passed near Ohiopyle increased the accessibility of the area and connected it to eastern markets. Lumbering became the dominant industry. Cooperages, tanneries, salt mining and coal mining were some of the smaller industries in the area.

The construction of the Baltimore and Ohio Railroad and the Western Maryland Railroad greatly accelerated the progress of the lumbering operations in Ohiopyle. Both railroads had stations in the borough. Several narrow gauge railroads were built up into the surrounding mountains. These smaller railways were able to efficiently transport lumber to the sawmills and rail stations of Ohiopyle.

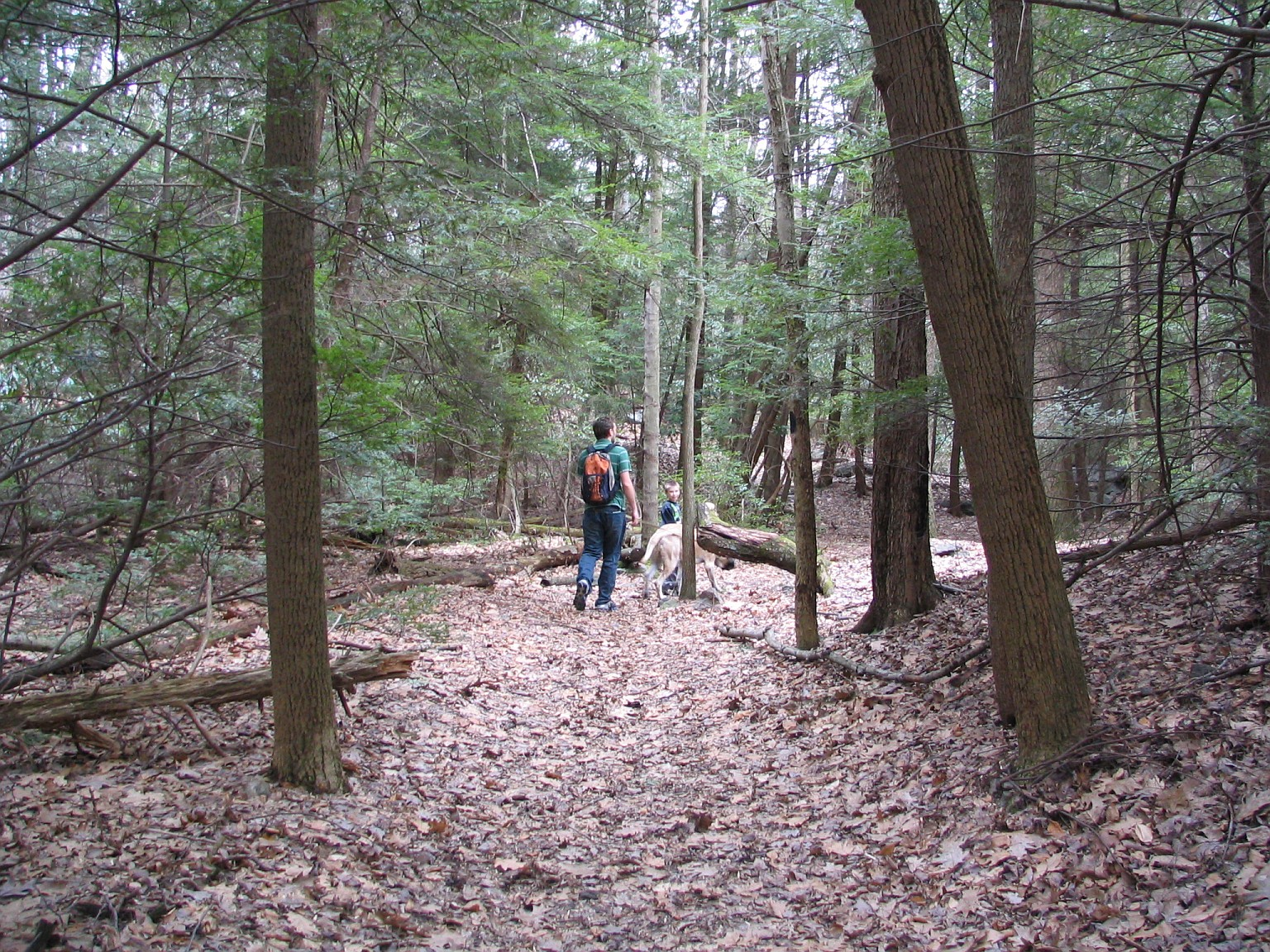
One of many walking trails.

The railroads also brought tourists to Ohiopyle. The round trip ride from Pittsburgh to Ohiopyle was one dollar. Tourists flocked to the area to see the waterfalls and stay at the resorts that quickly sprouted up along the Youghiogheny River. The resorts had boardwalks, dancing pavilions, bowling alleys, fountains, tennis courts, and hiking trails. The rise of the automobile brought about the end of the resorts at Ohiopyle. The buildings were torn down and the forests were allowed to regrow.

In 1963, Ohiopyle entered the current chapter of tourism. Wilderness Voyageurs, under the ownership of Lance Martin, began commercial whitewater rafting on the Youghiogheny River. This was the first commercial whitewater rafting company east of the Mississippi River. In 1963, 400 people experienced the rapids of the Lower Youghiogheny, in 2007 over 100,000 people came to "shoot the rapids" in rafts, kayaks, and canoes. Ohiopyle is also near Frank Lloyd Wright's masterpiece, Fallingwater, built in 1936, and this nearby attraction brings tourists through the town.

== Geography ==
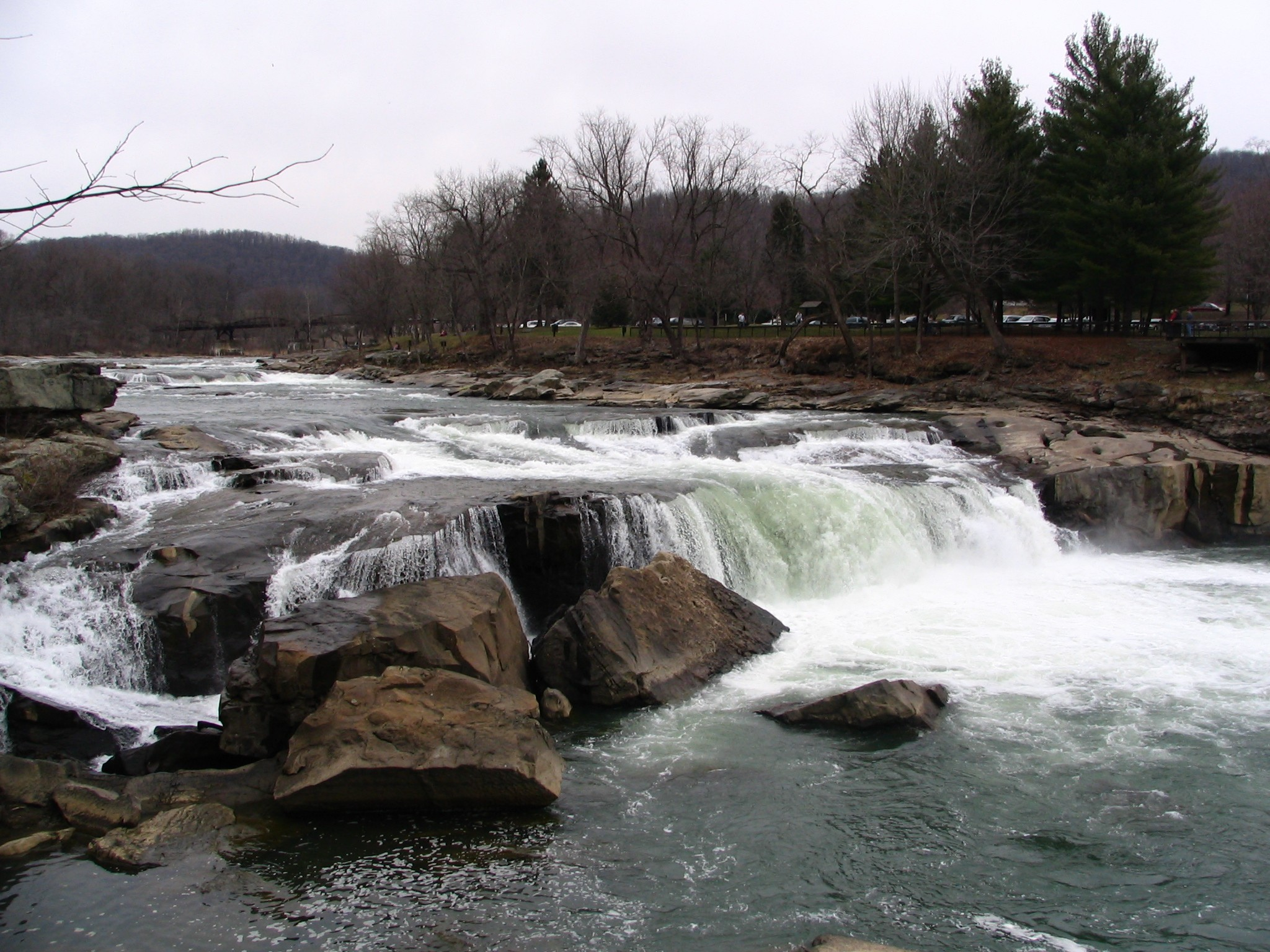
Ohiopyle Falls - Opposite View

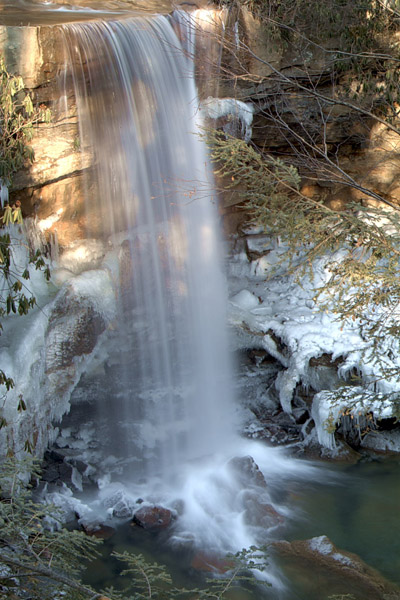
Cucumber Falls in the winter. 40 ft tall. Located in a gorge just off the Youghiogheny River. Located next to parking and sits on park trails.

Ohiopyle is located at 39°52′5″N 79°29′35″W (39.868130, −79.492929).

According to the United States Census Bureau, the borough has a total area of 0.5 square miles (1.3 km^{2}), of which 0.4 square mile (1.1 km^{2}) is land and 0.1 square miles (0.26 km^{2}) (14.29%) is water. The borough is surrounded by Ohiopyle State Park.

The Youghiogheny River runs through the town.

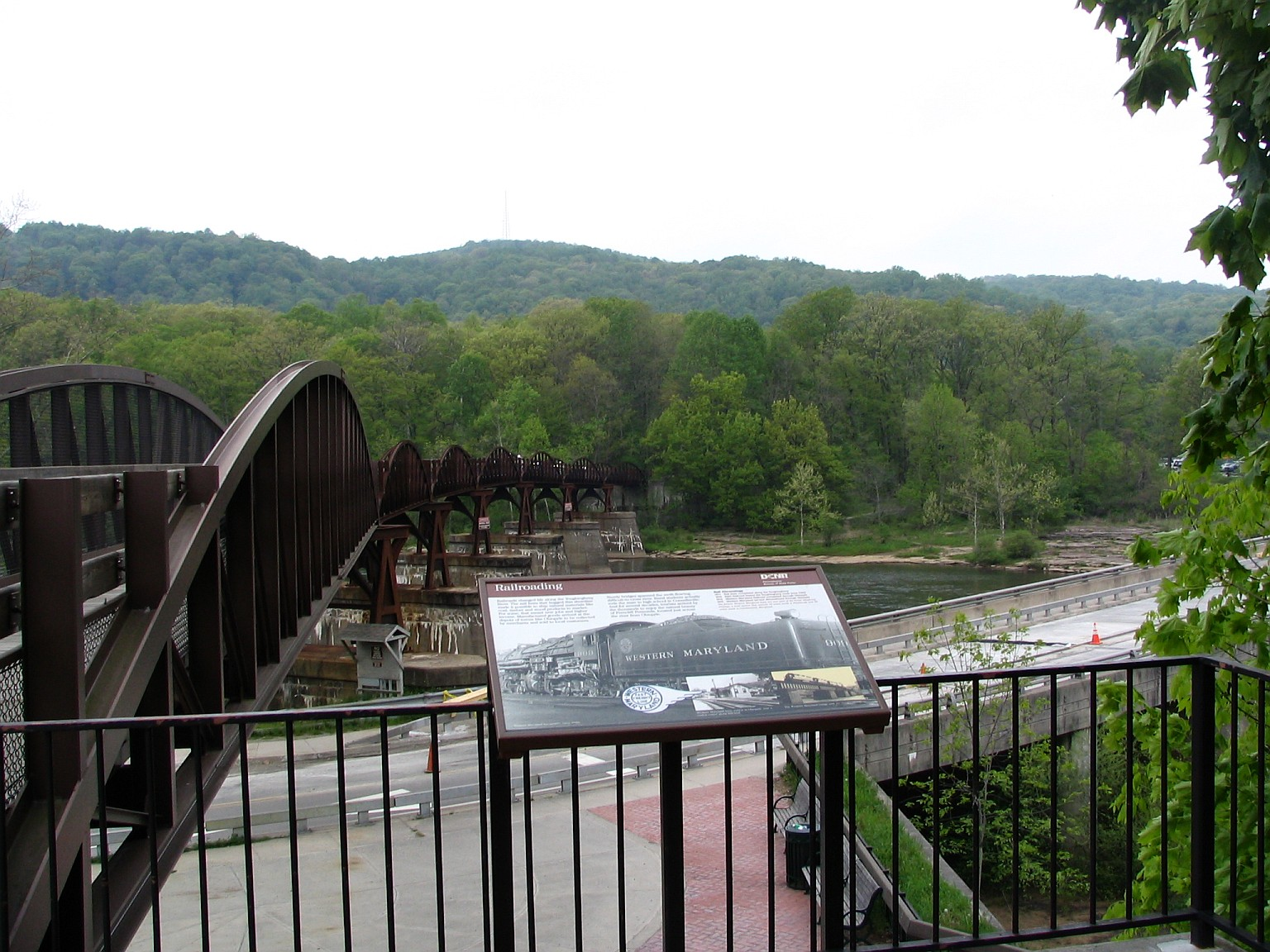
Walking Bridge across the Youghiogheny River.

=== Climate ===
The climate in this area has relatively small differences between highs and lows, and there is adequate rainfall year-round. According to the Köppen Climate Classification system, Ohiopyle has a marine west coast climate, abbreviated "Cfb" on climate maps.

Climate data for Ohiopyle, Pennsylvania
Month	Jan	Feb	Mar	Apr	May	Jun	Jul	Aug	Sep	Oct	Nov	Dec	Year
Mean daily maximum °C (°F)	1 (34)	3 (38)	9 (48)	16 (61)	21 (69)	24 (75)	26 (78)	25 (77)	21 (70)	16 (60)	10 (50)	3 (38)	14 (58)
Mean daily minimum °C (°F)	−7 (19)	−7 (20)	−3 (27)	3 (37)	8 (46)	13 (55)	15 (59)	14 (58)	11 (51)	4 (40)	0 (32)	−5 (23)	4 (39)
Average precipitation mm (inches)	110 (4.4)	97 (3.8)	120 (4.6)	120 (4.9)	140 (5.4)	130 (5)	140 (5.5)	110 (4.3)	110 (4.4)	94 (3.7)	110 (4.3)	110 (4.2)	1,380 (54.3)
Source: Weatherbase

== Demographics ==
Historical population
Census	Pop.	Note	%±
1900	423		—
1910	535		26.5%
1920	499		−6.7%
1930	425		−14.8%
1940	420		−1.2%
1950	345		−17.9%
1960	287		−16.8%
1970	140		−51.2%
1980	124		−11.4%
1990	81		−34.7%
2000	77		−4.9%
2010	59		−23.4%
2020	37		−37.3%
2021 (est.)	37	Steady	0.0%

As of the 2000 census, there were 77 people, 34 households, and 21 families residing in the borough. The population density was 185.9 inhabitants per square mile (71.8/km^{2}). There were 44 housing units at an average density of 106.2 per square mile (41.0/km^{2}). The racial makeup of the borough was 100.00% White. Hispanic or Latino of any race were 1.30% of the population.

There were 34 households, out of which 26.5% had children under the age of 18 living with them, 38.2% were married couples living together, 26.5% had a female householder with no husband present, and 35.3% were non-families. 32.4% of all households were made up of individuals, and 14.7% had someone living alone who was 65 years of age or older. The average household size was 2.26 and the average family size was 2.82.

In the borough the population was spread out, with 24.7% under the age of 18, 2.6% from 18 to 24, 27.3% from 25 to 44, 29.9% from 45 to 64, and 15.6% who were 65 years of age or older. The median age was 38 years. For every 100 females, there were 75.0 males. For every 100 females age 18 and over, there were 81.3 males.

The median income for a household in the borough was $22,083, and the median income for a family was $25,833. Males had a median income of $43,125 versus $20,625 for females. The per capita income for the borough was $10,247. There were 18.2% of families and 20.8% of the population living below the poverty line, including no under eighteens and 55.6% of those over 64.
