= Pennsylvania Route 601 =

State highway in Somerset County, Pennsylvania, US

Pennsylvania Route 601

Route information
- Maintained by PennDOT
- Length: 26.669 mi (42.920 km)

Major junctions
- South end: PA 31 / PA 281 in Somerset
- I-70 / I-76 / Penna Turnpike in Somerset; US 219 in Somerset Township; PA 985 in Lincoln Township; US 30 in Jenner Township; US 219 in Conemaugh Township; PA 403 in Benson
- North end: PA 56 in Paint

Location
- Country: United States
- State: Pennsylvania
- Counties: Somerset

Highway system
- Pennsylvania State Route System; Interstate; US; State; Scenic; Legislative
← PA 592	→ PA 602

Pennsylvania Route 601 (PA 601) is a 26.6-mile-long (42.8 km) state highway located in Somerset County, Pennsylvania. The southern terminus is at PA 31/PA 281 in Somerset. The northern terminus is at PA 56 in Paint.

== Route description ==
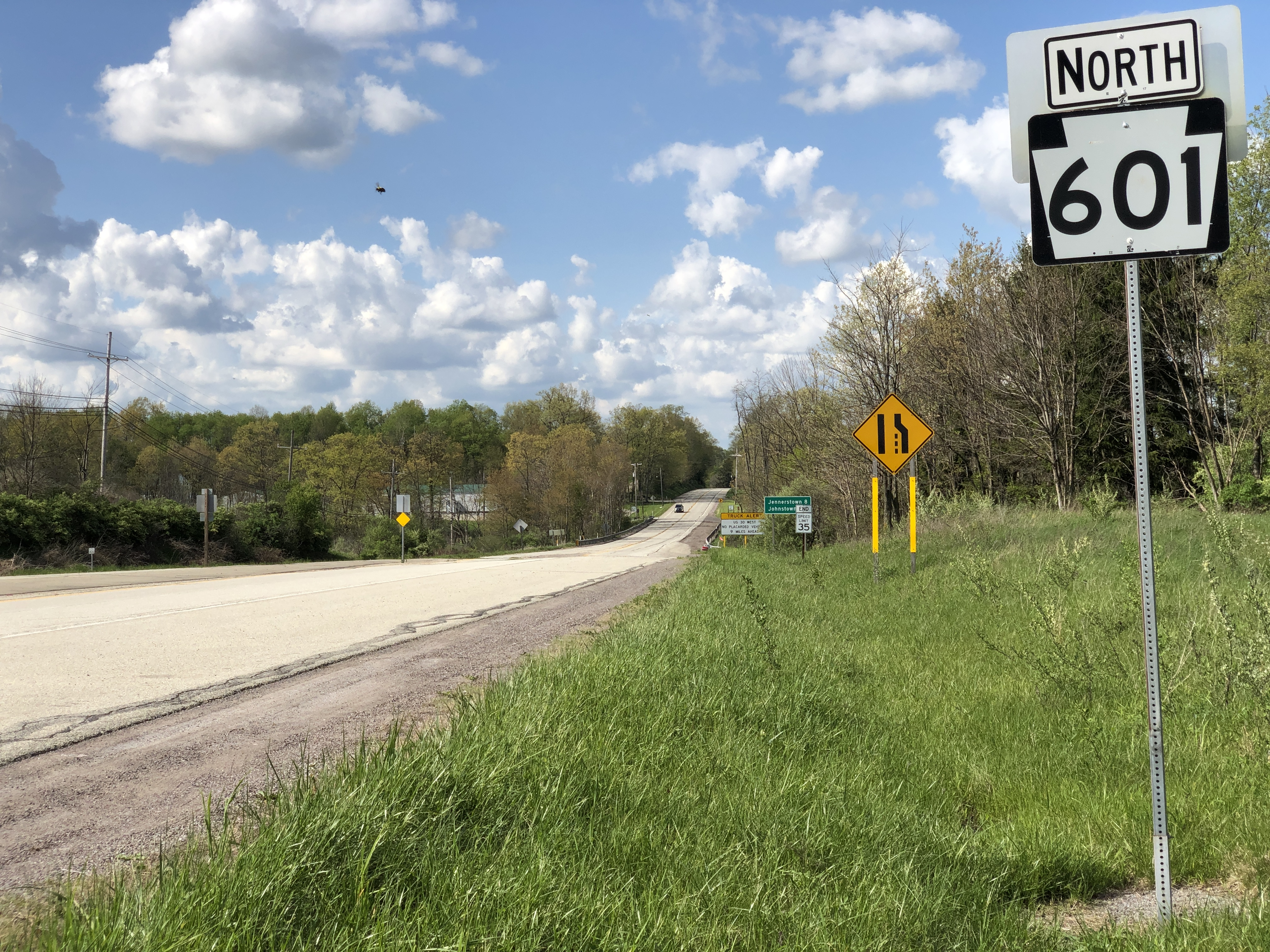
PA 601 northbound past ramp to US 219 in Somerset Township

PA 601 begins at an intersection with Main Street and Center Avenue; Main Street is part of a one-way pair carrying westbound PA 31 and southbound PA 281 in the commercial downtown of the borough of Somerset, heading north on two-lane undivided North Center Avenue. The road heads through the downtown before entering residential areas. The route gains a center left-turn lane and continues into business areas on the outskirts of town, coming to a ramp that provides access to I-70/I-76 (Pennsylvania Turnpike). After this, PA 601 briefly becomes a divided highway before regaining the center left-turn lane and coming to a bridge over the Pennsylvania Turnpike. At this point, the road crosses into Somerset Township and runs through more commercial areas, briefly forming the border between Somerset to the west and Somerset Township to the east prior to fully entering Somerset Township again. Farther north, the route passes homes and businesses with some farmland, becoming a two-lane divided highway. The center left-turn lane returns to PA 601 as it comes to a ramp that provides access to the US 219 freeway. Past this, the route becomes a two-lane undivided road and heads into a mix of farmland and woodland with some residences. PA 601 heads into Lincoln Township and becomes Somerset Pike before splitting to the north onto Penn Avenue near the Somerset Historical Center, with PA 985 continuing along Somerset Pike.

The route makes a turn to the east-northeast and passes through more agricultural areas with some woods and homes. The road curves to the north-northeast and runs through more rural areas. PA 601 continues into Jenner Township, where the route curves northeast prior to a turn to the north. The route becomes Front Street and runs through the residential community of Jenners prior to coming to an intersection with US 30 in Ferrellton. After this, the road becomes Penn Avenue again as it runs through wooded areas with some homes and businesses. PA 601 continues into the borough of Boswell and passes more residences along with a few businesses on Atkinson Way, heading northeast. The route makes a left turn to continue north on Penn Avenue where it passes through woodland and crosses Quemahoning Creek before turning northeast. The road crosses back into Jenner Township and continues through a mix of farm fields and woods with some homes. PA 601 curves to the north before making a bend to the east to enter Conemaugh Township. Here, the route runs through the residential community of Jerome prior to turning southeast and interchanging with the US 219 freeway.

Past this, the road curves east through a mix of farms, woods, and homes before heading into woodland and turning to the north. The route runs along the west bank of the Stonycreek River as it turns east and crosses PA 403 in rural residential areas. At this point, PA 601 becomes Seanor Road and continues east through forested areas with a few homes, with CSX's S&C Subdivision railroad line and the Stonycreek River running to the south of the road, passing through Maple Ridge. The route crosses the railroad line and the river into Paint Township and makes a turn to the south before turning northeast and crossing the Shade Creek and Norfolk Southern's South Fork Secondary railroad line. PA 601 turns north and winds northeast through more forests, soon heading into a mix of farmland and woodland with some homes. The road becomes more straight before it makes a turn to the north and continues into the borough of Paint. Here, PA 601 heads into residential areas, turning east onto Main Street and ending at an interchange with PA 56.

== Major intersections ==
The entire route is in Somerset County.

Location	mi	km	Destinations	Notes
Somerset	0.000	0.000	PA 31 west / PA 281 south (Main Street) / Center Avenue	Southern terminus
Somerset	0.532	0.856	I-70 / I-76 / Penna Turnpike – Pittsburgh, Harrisburg North Pleasant Avenue to US 219 / PA 31 east / PA 281 north	Access to I-70/I-76/Penna Tpk. via Turnpike Road
Somerset Township	3.111– 3.169	5.007– 5.100	US 219 – Johnstown, Meyersdale	Interchange
Lincoln Township	4.145	6.671	PA 985 north (Somerset Pike) – Jennerstown	Southern terminus of PA 985
Jenner Township	10.897	17.537	US 30 (Lincoln Highway) – Greensburg, Bedford	
Conemaugh Township	17.080– 17.240	27.488– 27.745	US 219 – Somerset, Johnstown	Interchange
Benson	18.312	29.470	PA 403 (Border Street) – Johnstown, Somerset	
Paint	26.634– 26.669	42.863– 42.920	PA 56 / Main Street – Bedford, Johnstown	Interchange; northern terminus
1.000 mi = 1.609 km; 1.000 km = 0.621 mi

== PA 601 Truck ==
Pennsylvania Route 601 Truck
- Location: Somerset County
- Length: 0.9 mi (1,400 m)

Pennsylvania Route 601 Truck is a truck route bypassing downtown Somerset. Mainline PA 601 experiences heavy truck volume due to its access to the Pennsylvania Turnpike at Exit 110. PA 601 Truck follows PA 281 and North Pleasant Avenue around the east side of Somerset to redirect truck traffic.

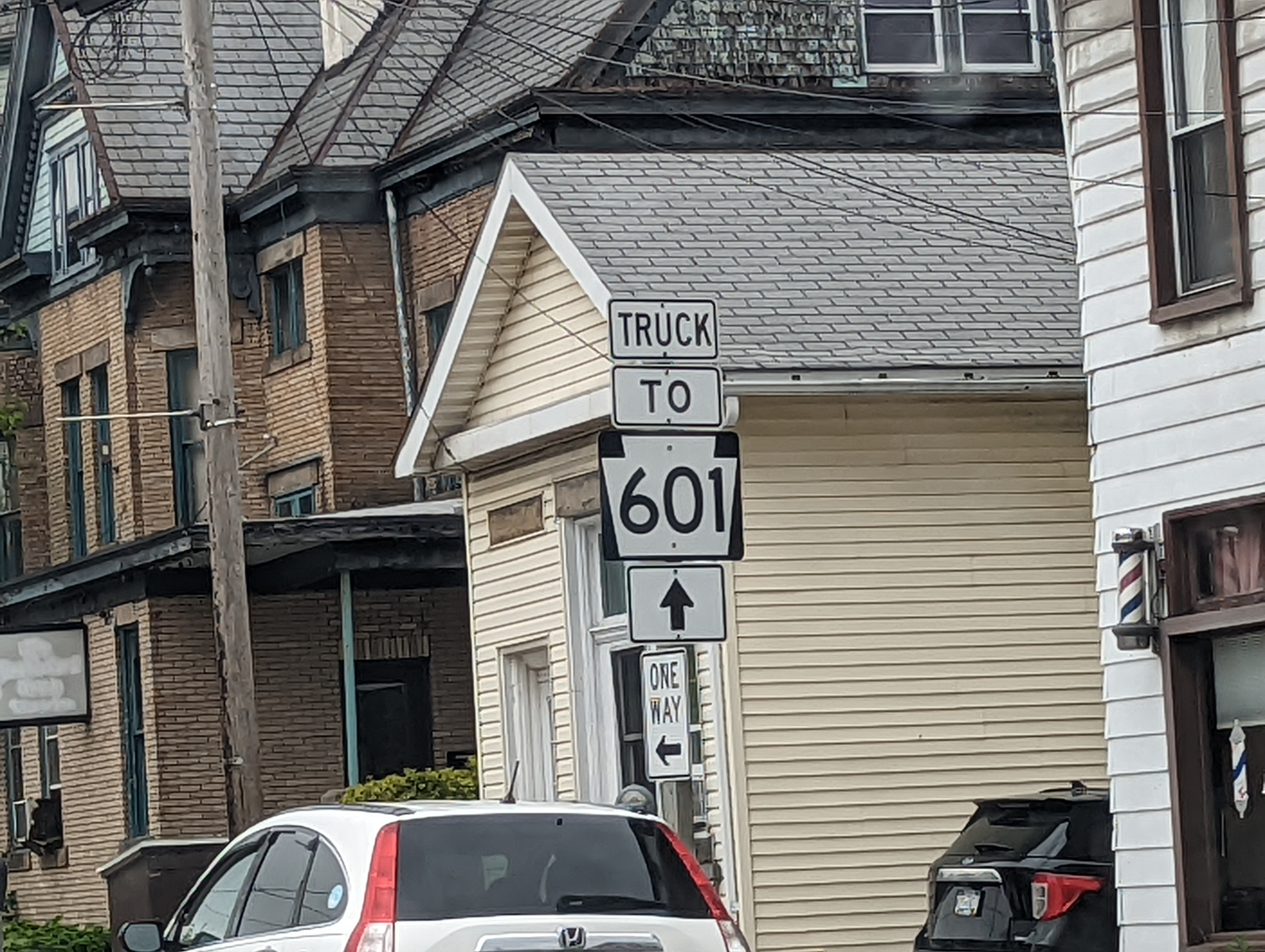
PA 601 Truck following PA 281 in Somerset.
