= Pennsylvania Route 985 =

State highway in Pennsylvania, US

Pennsylvania Route 985

Route information
- Maintained by PennDOT
- Length: 20.95 mi (33.72 km)
- Existed: 1928–present

Major junctions
- South end: PA 601 in Lincoln Township
- US 30 in Jennerstown
- North end: PA 403 near Ferndale

Location
- Country: United States
- State: Pennsylvania
- Counties: Somerset, Cambria

Highway system
- Pennsylvania State Route System; Interstate; US; State; Scenic; Legislative
← PA 984	→ PA 986

Pennsylvania Route 985 (PA 985) is a north–south road located in Somerset and Cambria counties in Pennsylvania. The road is 20.95 miles (33.72 km) long in southwestern Pennsylvania. The highway begins at PA 601 in Lincoln Township and ends at PA 403 in Johnstown. PA 985 goes through the towns of Acosta, Jennerstown, Forwardstown, and Johnstown.

== Route description ==
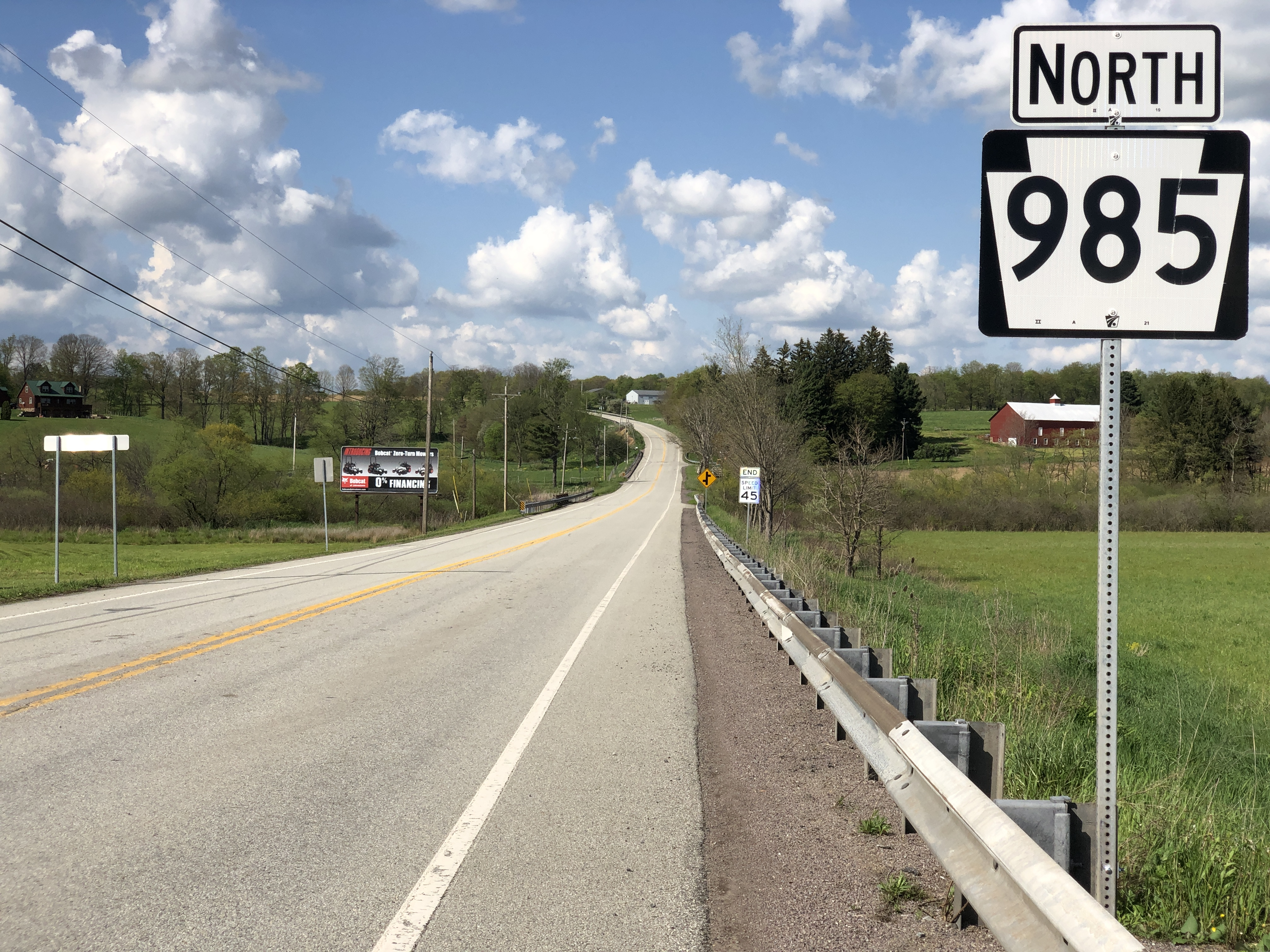
PA 985 northbound in Jenner Township

PA 985 begins at PA 601 in Lincoln Township, Somerset County, heading northwest on two-lane undivided Somerset Pike. The road heads through areas of farms and woods with some commercial development, passing to the east of the Somerset Historical Center. The route turns northwest into wooded areas before curving north into open agricultural areas with a few homes. PA 985 runs through more farmland and woodland with some residences as it continues into Jenner Township. The road curves northeast and becomes the border between the borough of Jennerstown to the northwest and Jenner Township to the southeast as it passes southeast of Jennerstown Speedway. The route fully enters Jennerstown as it passes homes before heading into business areas and crossing US 30. Past this, PA 985 passes through wooded areas of homes before becoming the border between Jenner Township to the northwest and Jennerstown to the southeast as it passes west of Stoughton Lake. The road heads entirely into Jennerstown again as it runs through farmland with some homes. The route continues back into Jenner Township, running through open agricultural areas with some patches of woods and residences. PA 985 curves to the north and passes through Glessner, continuing past more farms before heading into more wooded areas with some homes. The road turns to the northeast and passes through Forwardstown, curving east through more woodland with some fields and residences. The route crosses into Conemaugh Township, heading into more forested areas with a few homes and turning northeast at Thomas Mills. PA 985 continues north through more rural areas, winding to the northwest before heading northeast at an intersection with SR 4018 as it begins to run along the northwestern bank of Bens Creek. The road runs east through more wooded areas with some fields and residences, turning east-northeast as it passes through Bens Creek. PA 985 enters Upper Yoder Township in Cambria County and becomes Franklin Street as it passes homes, turning east briefly onto Ferndale Avenue to end at PA 403.

== Major intersections ==
County	Location	mi	km	Destinations	Notes
Somerset	Lincoln Township	0.00	0.00	PA 601 (Somerset Pike / Penn Avenue) – Somerset, Boswell	Southern terminus
Somerset	Jennerstown	7.20	11.59	US 30 (Pitt Street / Lincoln Highway) – Greensburg, Bedford	
Cambria	Upper Yoder Township	20.95	33.72	PA 403 (Tire Hill Road / Ferndale Avenue)	Northern terminus
1.000 mi = 1.609 km; 1.000 km = 0.621 mi
