= Directorate General of Mines Safety =

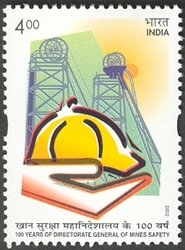
Stamp of India - 2002 on 100 years of Directorate General of Mines Safety.

The Directorate General of Mines Safety is an agency of the India which administers the provisions of the government of India Mines Act, 1952 and, the Rules and Regulations framed there under. As per Constitution of India, occupational safety, welfare and health of workers employed in mines (coal, metalliferous and oil-mines) are the concern of the Central Government, under the Union Ministry of Labour & Employment.

The directorate carries out the mandates of the Mine Act at all mining and mineral processing operations in the India, regardless of size, number of employees, commodity mined, or method of extraction.

The organization has its headquarters at Dhanbad (Jharkhand) and is headed by Director-General of Mines Safety.

== Mission ==
Their mission is of continuous improvement of ‘safety and health standards, practices and performances’ in mines and oil-fields of India.

They implement ‘pro-active safety and health strategies’, and continuously improve their processes. They ensure ‘effective use of resources’ and behavioral change in its personnel.

== Safety, health, and welfare legislation ==
The directorate administers the following acts and regulations:

- The Mines Act, 1952
1. Coal Mines Regulations, 1957
2. The Metalliferous Mines Regulations, 1961
3. Oil Mines Regulations-1984
4. Mines Rules, 1955
5. Mines Vocational Training Rules, 1966
6. The Mines Rescue Rules, 1985
7. Mines Creche Rules, 1966
- Electricity Act, 2003
1. Central Electricity Authority( Measures Relating to Safety and Electric Supply) Regulations, 2010
- Allied Legislations
1. Factories Act, 1948, India- Chapter III & IV
2. Manufacture, storage & import of Hazardous Chemicals Rules, 1989
- Under Environmental (Protection) Act, 1986
1. Land Acquisition (Mines) Act, 1895
2. The Coal Mines (Conservation & Development ) Act, 1974

== See also ==
- Gas testing examination
- Mine Safety and Health Administration
