= Somerset Township, Pennsylvania =

Somerset Township is the name of two places in the U.S. state of Pennsylvania:

- Somerset Township, Somerset County, Pennsylvania
- Somerset Township, Washington County, Pennsylvania

== See also ==
- Somerset, Pennsylvania (disambiguation)
