= Walter's Mill Bridge =

Covered bridge in Pennsylvania, US

- U.S. National Register of Historic Places
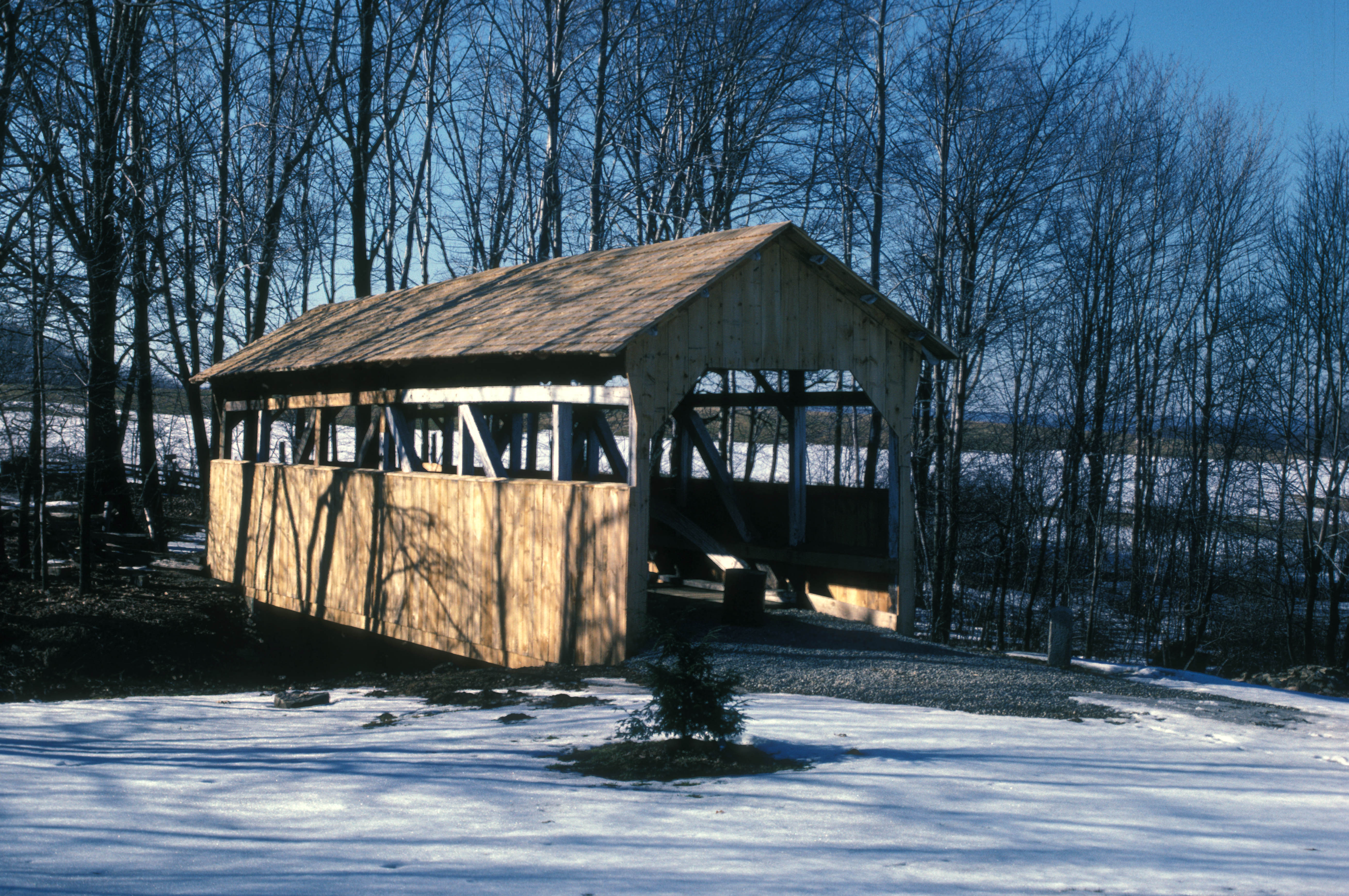

- Location within Pennsylvania Location within the United States
- Location: North of Somerset off Pennsylvania Route 985, Somerset Township, Pennsylvania
- Coordinates: 40°3′56″N 79°4′40″W
- Area: 0.1 acres (0.040 ha)
- Built: 1830
- Architect: Christian Ankeny
- Architectural style: Burr arch
- MPS: Covered Bridges of Somerset County TR
- NRHP reference No.: 80003635
- Added to NRHP: December 10, 1980

The Walter's Mill Bridge is a historic covered bridge in Somerset Township, Somerset County, Pennsylvania. It was built in 1830, and is a 60-foot-long (18 m) Burr truss bridge, with vertical plank siding and a tin covered gable roof. The bridge crosses Haupt's Run. It is one of 10 covered bridges in Somerset County.

It was added to the National Register of Historic Places in 1980.

== See also ==
- Somerset Historical Center
