= Somerset, Pennsylvania (disambiguation) =

Somerset, Pennsylvania may refer to:

- the borough of Somerset, Pennsylvania
- Somerset County, Pennsylvania
- Somerset Historical Center
- Somerset Township, Pennsylvania (disambiguation)
