= Trostletown Bridge =

Covered bridge in Pennsylvania, US

- U.S. National Register of Historic Places
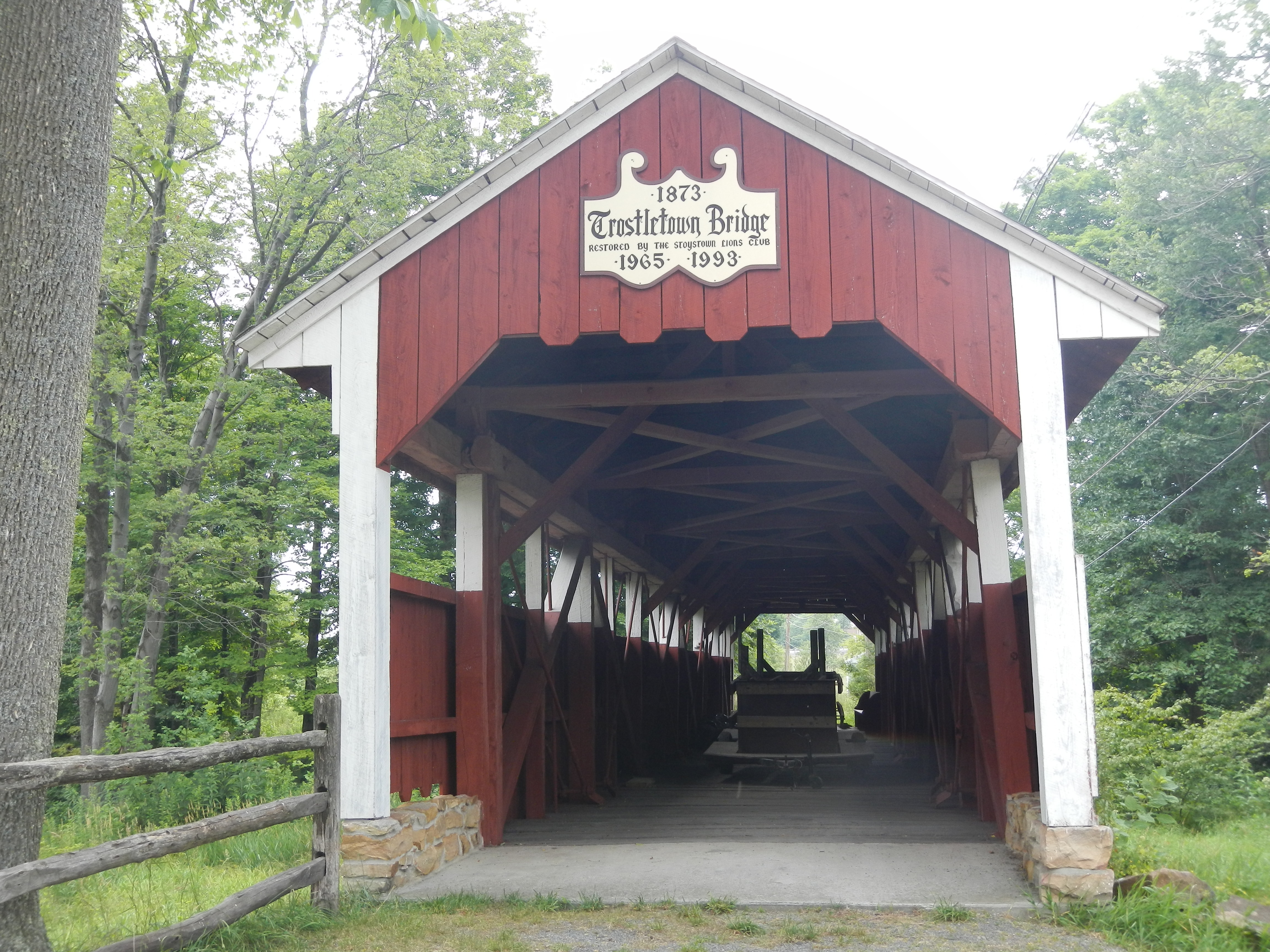
- Trostletown Bridge, July 2012

- Location within Pennsylvania Location within the United States
- Location: Southeast of Stoystown off U.S. Route 30, Quemahoning Township, Pennsylvania
- Coordinates: 40°5′45″N 78°56′44″W
- Area: 0.1 acres (0.040 ha)
- Built: 1845
- Architectural style: Kingpost truss
- MPS: Covered Bridges of Somerset County TR
- NRHP reference No.: 80003636
- Added to NRHP: December 11, 1980

The Trostletown Bridge is a historic covered bridge in Quemahoning Township, Somerset County, Pennsylvania. It was built in 1845, and is a 104-foot-long (32 m) Kingpost truss bridge, with half-height plank siding and an asbestos shingled gable roof. The bridge crosses Stony Creek. It is one of 10 covered bridges in Somerset County.

It was added to the National Register of Historic Places in 1980.
