= Oil Mines Regulations, 1984 =

Oil Mines Regulations, 1984 (OMR 1984) replaces the Oil Mines Regulations, 1933, with effect from October 1984 to deal with matters for the prevention of possible dangers in oil mines in India.

OMR 1984 was published in 1986 by Directorate General of Mines Safety, Ministry of Labour in Dhanbad, Jharkhand.

== Salient Features ==
Short Title; Extent; Application and; Definitions. (Reg 1–2)

- Chapter-II

Returns, Notices and Plans. (Reg 3–9)

- Chapter-III : Inspectors, Management and Duties

Qualifications; Appointment; General Management and; Duties of Pe ns Employed in Mines for various functions. (Reg 10–23)

- Chapter-IV : Drilling and Workover

Reg 24- Derricks; 25- Derrick platforms and floors; 26- Ladders; 27- Safety belts and life lines; 28- Emergency escape device; 29- Weight indicator; 30- Escape exits; 31- Guardrails, handrails and covers; 32- Draw-works; 33- Cathead and cat line; 34- Tongs; 35- Safety chains or wire lines; 36- Casing lines; 37- Rigging equipment for material handling; 38- Storage of materials; 39- Construction and loading of pipe-racks; 40- Rigging-up and rig dismantling; 41- Mud tanks and mud pumps; 42- Blowout preventer assembly; 43- Control system for blowout preventers; 44- Testing of blowout preventer assembly; 45- Precautions against blowout; 46- Precautions after a blowout has occurred; 47- Drilling workover and other operations; 48- Precautions during drill stem test.

- Chapter-V: Production

Well completion, Testing and Activation (Reg 49–50)

Group Gathering Station and Emergency Plan (Reg 51-51A)

Precautions during acidizing operations; fracture operations and; loading and unloading of petroleum tankers. (Reg 52–54)

Storage Tank; Well servicing operations; Artificial lifting of oil; Temporary closure of producing well and; Plugging requirements of abandoned wells (Reg 55–59)

- Chapter-V: Production

Application (Reg-60)

- Chapter-VI : Transport and pipelines

Approval and design of the route and design of pipeline, their laying and, Emergency procedure. (Reg 61–64)

- Chapter - VII : Protection against Gases and Fires

Storage and use of flammable material; Precaution against noxious, flammable gases and, fire; Fire Fighting Equipment and; Contingency plan. (Reg 65–72)

- Chapter-VIII : Machinery, Plant and Equipment

Use of certain machinery and equipment; Classification of Hazardous Area; Use of electrical equipment in hazardous area; General Provisions about construction and maintenance of machinery; Internal combustion Engines; Apparatus under pressure; Precautions regarding moving parts of machinery; Engine rooms and their exits and; Working and examination of machinery. (Reg 73–81)

- Chapter-IX : General Safety Provision

Housekeeping; General/Emergency lighting; Supply and use of protective equipments; Protection against noise, toxic dusts, gases and ionising radiation; Communication; Protection against pollution of environment; Fencings and; General Safety. (Reg 82–98)

- Chapter-X : Miscellaneous

Safety and health education, instructions and, inspections; Returns, notices, correspondence and Appeals. (Reg 99-106)

== See also ==
- Energy law#India
- Oil spill
