= Bridge in Jenner Township =

- U.S. National Register of Historic Places
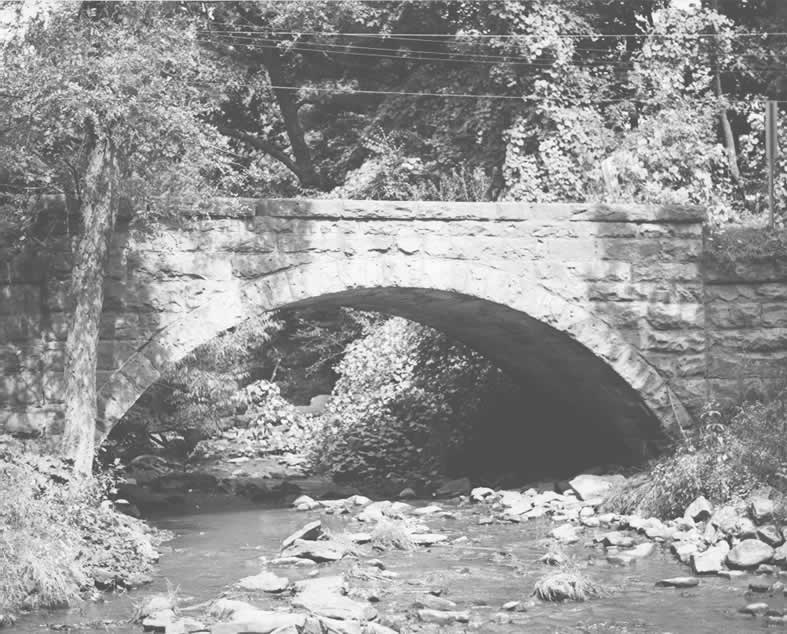
- Bridge in Jenner Township, 1982

- Location within Pennsylvania Location within the United States
- Location: Legislative Route 55125 over Roaring Run, Jenner Township, Pennsylvania
- Coordinates: 40°10′18″N 79°0′49″W
- Area: less than one acre
- Built: 1908
- Architectural style: Single span stone arch
- MPS: Highway Bridges Owned by the Commonwealth of Pennsylvania, Department of Transportation TR
- NRHP reference No.: 88000853
- Added to NRHP: June 22, 1988

Bridge in Jenner Township is a historic stone arch bridge in Jenner Township, Somerset County, Pennsylvania. It was built in 1908, and is a 31-foot-6-inch-long (9.60 m) bridge, constructed of rocked faced ashlar. The bridge crosses Roaring Run.

It was added to the National Register of Historic Places in 1980.
