= Matthew Hair Farm =

Historic house in Pennsylvania, United States

- U.S. National Register of Historic Places
- U.S. Historic district
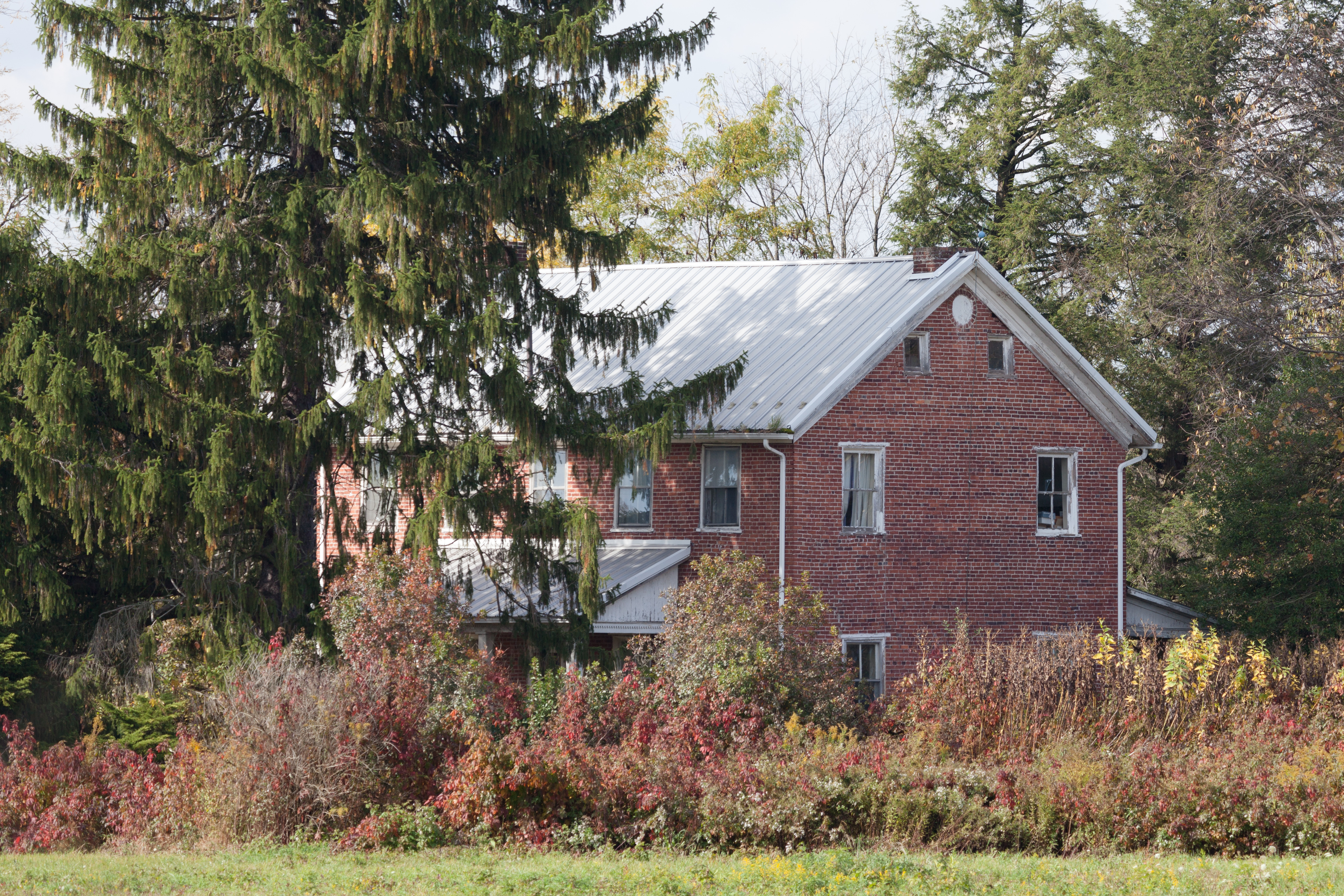
- Farmhouse in October 2014

- Location within Pennsylvania Location within the United States
- Location: Off PA 601, 1 mi. N of Boswell, Jenner Township, Pennsylvania
- Coordinates: 40°11′13″N 78°59′56″W
- Area: 110 acres (45 ha)
- Built: 1817, c. 1850, 1870
- Architectural style: Georgian
- NRHP reference No.: 96001207
- Added to NRHP: October 24, 1996

The Matthew Hair Farm, also known as the Calvin Shaulis Farm and Fruit Crest, is an historic farm and national historic district located in Jenner Township in Somerset County, Pennsylvania, United States.

It was listed on the National Register of Historic Places in 1996.

== History and architectural features ==
This district includes three contributing buildings and three contributing structures. The buildings are a Georgian-inspired, vernacular, brick house (1817), a Germanic-influenced bank barn (c. 1870), and a kitchen/spring house (c. 1850). The house is a 2 1/2-story, double-pile, modified, central-passage dwelling with a gable roof. It features a shed-roof front porch. The structures are a twentieth-century man-made pond, a cistern, and a windmill to pump water to the cistern.
