= Daniel B. Zimmerman Mansion =

Historic house in Pennsylvania, United States

- U.S. National Register of Historic Places
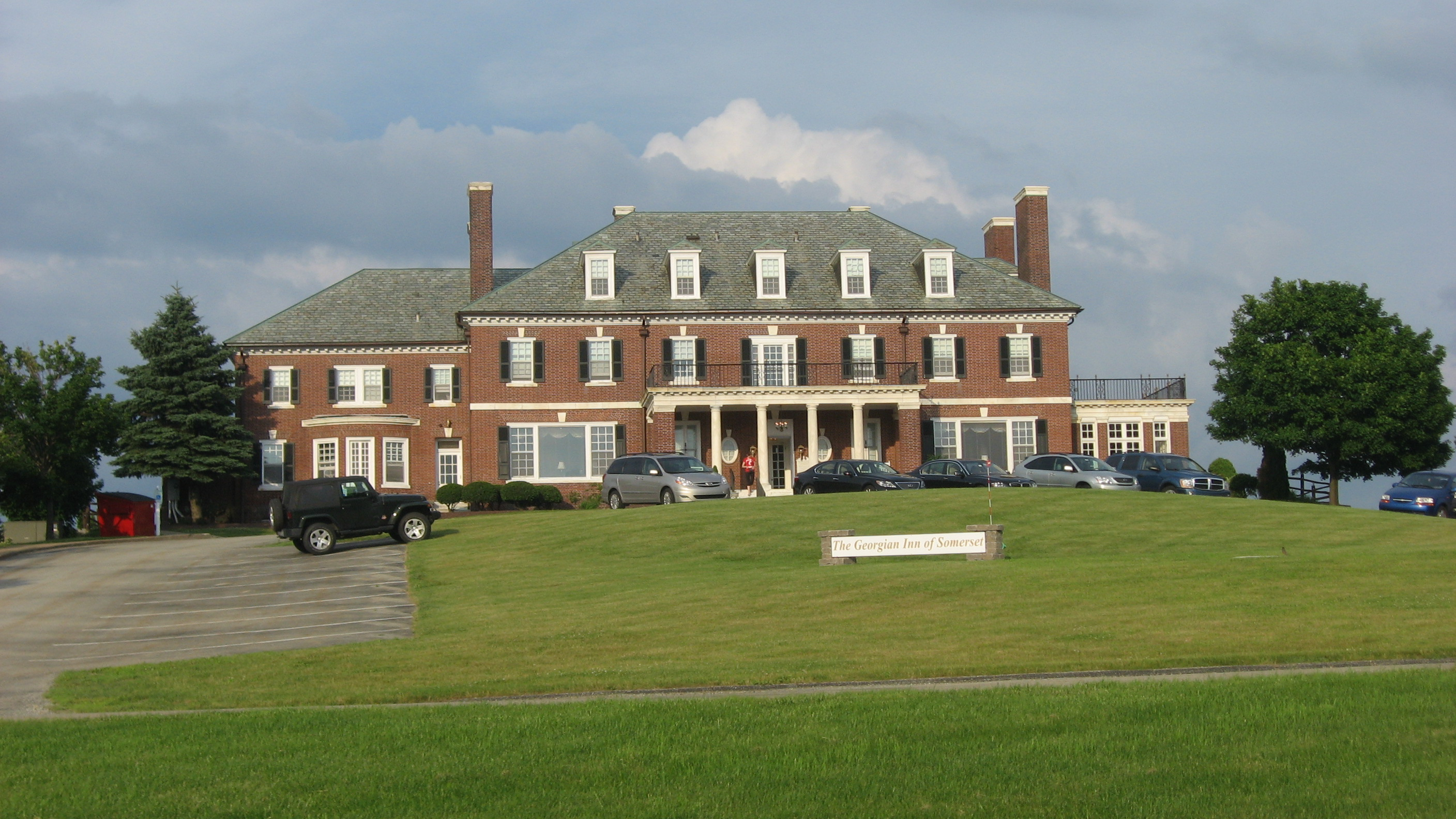
- Front of the mansion

- Location within Pennsylvania Location within the United States
- Location: 800 Georgian Inn Dr., Somerset Township, Pennsylvania
- Coordinates: 40°1′17″N 79°4′29″W
- Area: less than one acre
- Built: 1915
- Architect: Horace Trumbauer, et al.
- Architectural style: Georgian Revival
- NRHP reference No.: 95000129
- Added to NRHP: February 24, 1995

Daniel B. Zimmerman Mansion, also known as Manor Hill, now the Georgian Inn of Somerset, is a historic mansion located at Somerset Township, Somerset County, Pennsylvania. It was designed by noted Philadelphia architect Horace Trumbauer and built in 1915. It is a 3-story, brick Georgian Revival style mansion, with a five bay central section with a hipped roof, flanked by asymmetrical wings. It has housed a hotel since 2010.

It was added to the National Register of Historic Places in 1995.

It has actually operated as a hotel since 1990. It was purchased by lighthouse partners, who developed lighthouse place outlet mall in Michigan city, Indiana, in 1989. The Georgian Inn first opened in 1990.
