= Lincoln Township, Somerset County, Pennsylvania =

Township in Pennsylvania, US

Coordinates: 40°07′31″N 79°07′35″W

- Township
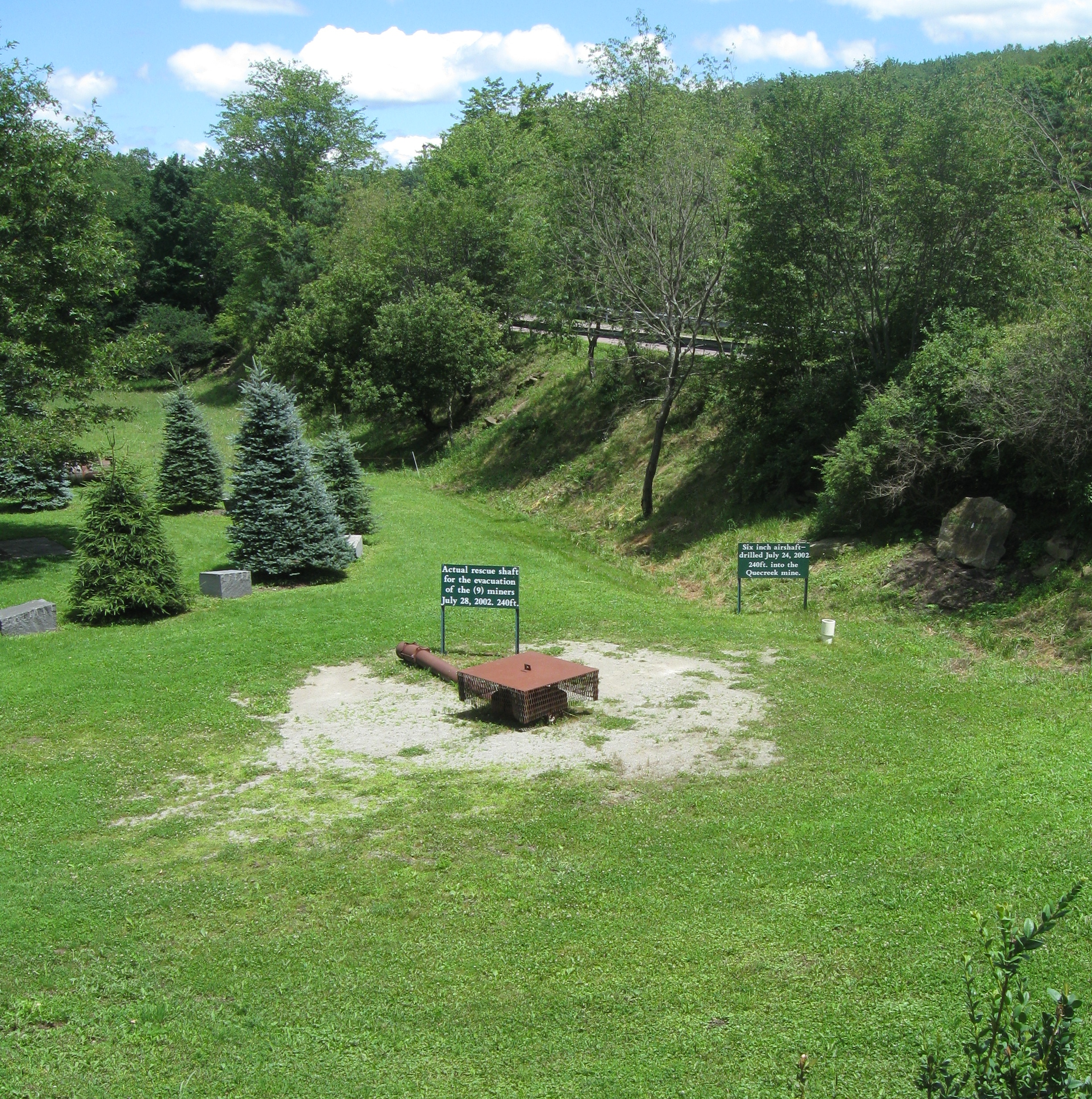
- Site of the Quecreek Mine rescue

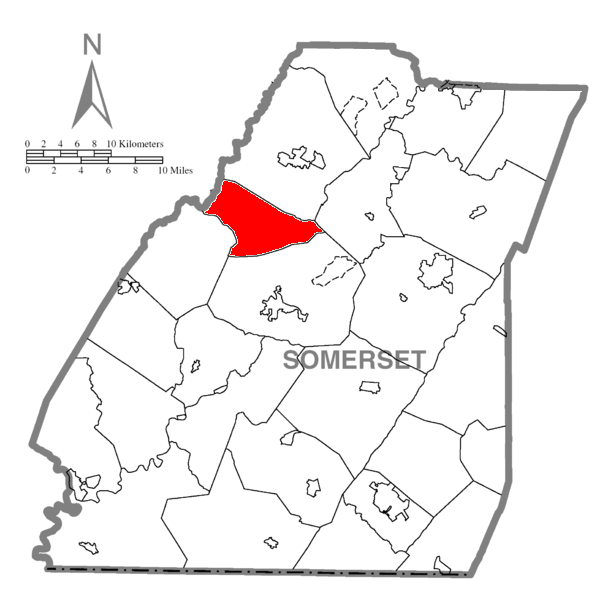
- Map of Somerset County, Pennsylvania Highlighting Lincoln Township

- Map of Somerset County, Pennsylvania
- Country: United States
- State: Pennsylvania
- County: Somerset

Area
  - Total: 25.73 sq mi (66.65 km^{2})
  - Land: 25.73 sq mi (66.65 km^{2})
  - Water: 0 sq mi (0.00 km^{2})

Population (2020)
  - Total: 1,456 ▼
  - Estimate (2021): 1,443
  - Density: 57.0/sq mi (21.99/km^{2})
- Time zone: UTC-5 (Eastern (EST))
  - Summer (DST): UTC-4 (EDT)
- FIPS code: 42-111-43440

Lincoln Township is a township in Somerset County, Pennsylvania, United States. The population was 1,456 at the 2020 census. It is part of the Johnstown, Pennsylvania, Metropolitan Statistical Area.

== Geography ==
According to the United States Census Bureau, the township has a total area of 25.7 square miles (66.7 km^{2}), all land. Lincoln Township is bordered by Jenner Township to the northeast, Quemahoning Township to the east, Somerset Township to the southeast, Jefferson Township to the southwest, and Westmoreland County to the northwest. It contains the census-designated place of Edie.

== Demographics ==
Historical population
Census	Pop.	Note	%±
2010	1,519		—
2020	1,456		−4.1%
2021 (est.)	1,443		−0.9%
U.S. Decennial Census

At the 2000 census there were 1,669 people, 642 households, and 489 families living in the township. The population density was 64.8 inhabitants per square mile (25.0/km^{2}). There were 676 housing units at an average density of 26.3 per square mile (10.2/km^{2}). The racial makeup of the township was 99.40% White, 0.12% African American, 0.12% Asian, 0.24% from other races, and 0.12% from two or more races. Hispanic or Latino of any race were 0.30%.

Of the 642 households 33.8% had children under the age of 18 living with them, 64.2% were married couples living together, 7.5% had a female householder with no husband present, and 23.8% were non-families. 20.2% of households were one person and 11.5% were one person aged 65 or older. The average household size was 2.60 and the average family size was 2.99.

The age distribution was 24.8% under the age of 18, 6.7% from 18 to 24, 29.2% from 25 to 44, 25.7% from 45 to 64, and 13.7% 65 or older. The median age was 39 years. For every 100 females there were 100.8 males. For every 100 females age 18 and over, there were 99.8 males.

The median household income was $37,902 and the median family income was $42,895. Males had a median income of $30,769 versus $20,761 for females. The per capita income for the township was $16,400. About 11.1% of families and 14.1% of the population were below the poverty line, including 16.6% of those under age 18 and 23.0% of those age 65 or over.
