= Metalliferous Mines Regulations, 1961 =

The Metalliferous Mines Regulations, 1961 replaces both the Metalliferous Mines Regulations, 1926 and the Mysore Gold Mines Regulations, 1953 to prevent possible dangers, accidents and deaths from mining in India.

== Important regulations ==
9: Notice of Accident.

10: Notice of disease

60, 61, 63, & 64: Mine plans and Sections

106 to 118: Method of working in mines

119 to 130: Danger from fire, dust gas and water

146, 148: Standards of lighting in the mines

153 to 170: Use of explosive in mines

== See also ==
- Coal Mines Regulation Act 1908
