= Jenner Township, Pennsylvania =

Township in Pennsylvania, US

Jenner Township, Somerset County, Pennsylvania
- Township
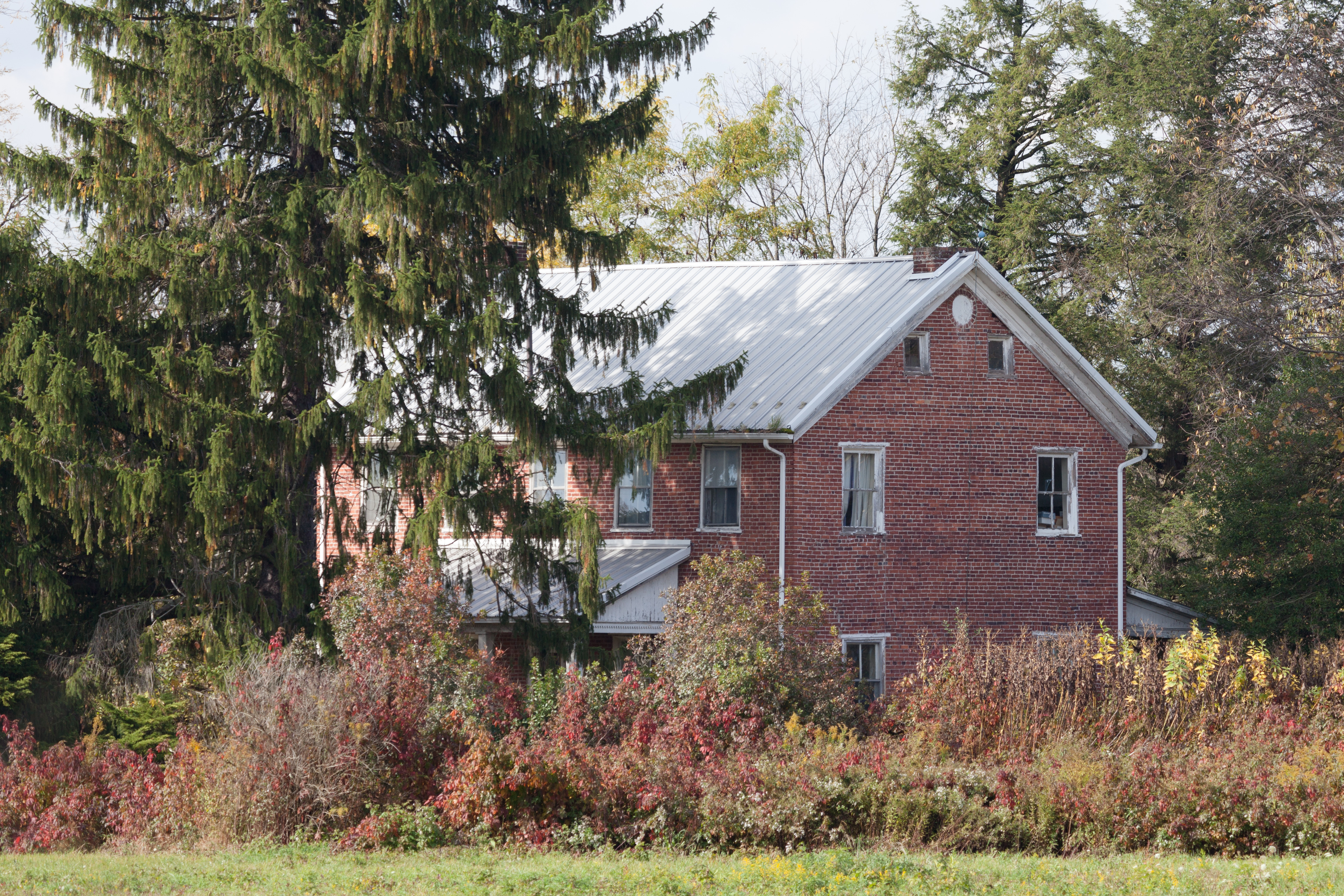
- The Matthew Hair Farmhouse, a historic site in the township

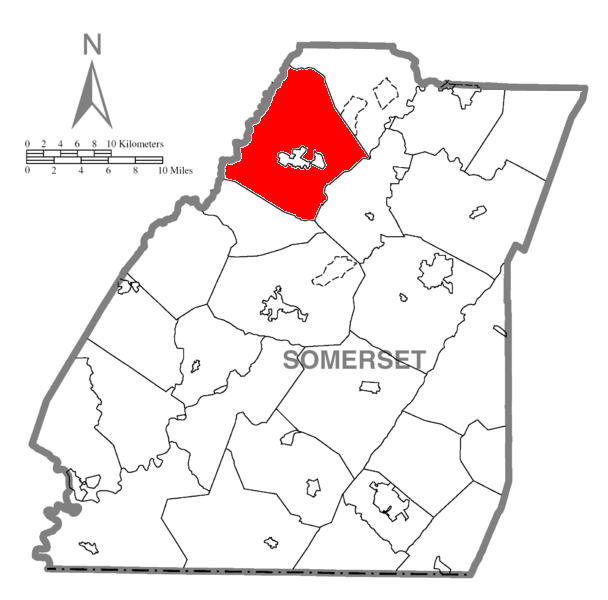
- Map of Somerset County, Pennsylvania Highlighting Jenner Township

- Map of Somerset County, Pennsylvania
- Country: United States
- State: Pennsylvania
- County: Somerset

Area
  - Total: 65.12 sq mi (168.65 km^{2})
  - Land: 64.62 sq mi (167.37 km^{2})
  - Water: 0.50 sq mi (1.29 km^{2})

Population (2020)
  - Total: 3,703 ▼
  - Estimate (2021): 3,666
  - Density: 60.6/sq mi (23.39/km^{2})
- Time zone: UTC-5 (Eastern (EST))
  - Summer (DST): UTC-4 (EDT)
- FIPS code: 42-111-38032

Jenner Township is a township in Somerset County, Pennsylvania, United States. The population was 3,703 at the 2020 census. It is part of the Johnstown, Pennsylvania, Metropolitan Statistical Area.

Jenner Township includes the unincorporated communities of Jenners, Jenner Crossroads, Ralphton, Pilltown, Ferrellton, Acosta, and Gray. Jenner Township completely surrounds the nearby boroughs of Boswell and Jennerstown, each of which has its own government and is not part of the Township.

== Geography ==
It is located approximately at 40.175°N by 79.06°W. According to the U.S. Census Bureau, the township has a total area of 65.1 square miles (169 km^{2}), of which 64.6 square miles (167 km^{2}) is land and 0.5 square miles (1.3 km^{2}) (0.77%) is water. Jenner Township is bordered by Conemaugh Township to the northeast, Quemahoning Township to the southeast, Lincoln Township to the southwest, and Westmoreland County to the northwest.

== Demographics ==
Historical population
Census	Pop.	Note	%±
2010	4,122		—
2020	3,703		−10.2%
2021 (est.)	3,666		−1.0%
U.S. Decennial Census

As of the census of 2000, there were 4,054 people, 1,598 households, and 1,192 families residing in the township. The population density was 62.8 inhabitants per square mile (24.2/km^{2}). There were 1,773 housing units at an average density of 27.4 per square mile (10.6/km^{2}). The racial makeup of the township was 99.33% White, 0.05% Native American, 0.10% Asian, 0.12% from other races, and 0.39% from two or more races. Hispanic or Latino of any race were 0.25% of the population.

There were 1,598 households, out of which 28.8% had children under the age of 18 living with them, 59.6% were married couples living together, 9.9% had a female householder with no husband present, and 25.4% were non-families. 22.3% of all households were made up of individuals, and 11.4% had someone living alone who was 65 years of age or older. The average household size was 2.54 and the average family size was 2.96.

In the township the population was spread out, with 22.1% under the age of 18, 8.0% from 18 to 24, 27.0% from 25 to 44, 26.7% from 45 to 64, and 16.2% who were 65 years of age or older. The median age was 41 years. For every 100 females there were 98.0 males. For every 100 females age 18 and over, there were 97.6 males.

The median income for a household in the township was $32,141, and the median income for a family was $39,341. Males had a median income of $26,163 versus $22,688 for females. The per capita income for the township was $15,066. About 8.8% of families and 10.2% of the population were below the poverty line, including 14.6% of those under age 18 and 11.7% of those age 65 or over.

== History ==
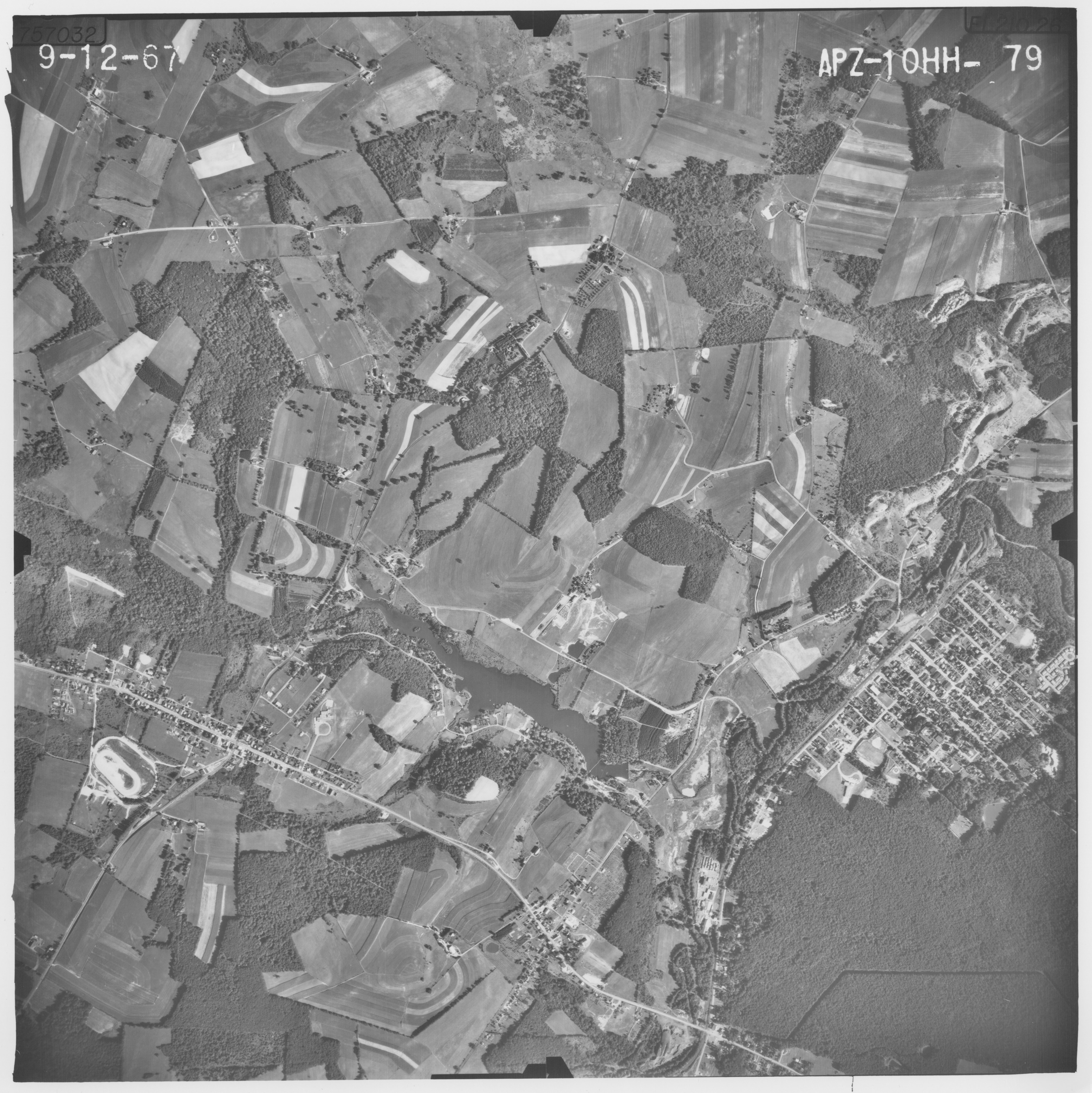
Jenner Township in 1967

Initial hunters and settlers in the territory that includes present-day Jenner Township were Mingo, also known as the Seneca, one of the Six Nations of the Iroquois. The land was ceded by the Iroquois Six Nations officially by the Treaty of Fort Stanwix of 1768 to Penn family as proprietors of Pennsylvania province. Early European traders crossed Jenner Township as early as 1750, when Christopher Gist documented his brief time there in his travel diary. Gist is said to have named Quemahoning Creek, which drains much of Jenner Township. The Northern Trail, an established Indian trail, crossed the territory from east to west, intersecting Quemahoning Creek at Kickenapaulin's Town, a rather substantial Indian settlement, the site of which now lies under the waters of the Quemahoning Reservoir, just outside the township. In August 1758, the Northern Trail was improved, initially for the British military use, and renamed the Forbes Trail, later known as the Pennsylvania Road, the Lincoln Highway, and now U.S. Route 30.

With the building of the Forbes Road to Fort Ligonier and, later, onward to Fort Pitt, present-day Pittsburgh, European settlement began in earnest. Jenner Township was formed out of the western part of Quemahoning Township in 1811. The township was named in honor of Dr. Edward Jenner, discoverer of the smallpox vaccine. Early Jenner Township settlers were primarily German and English speakers engaged in agriculture. Pennsylvania Dutch was still spoken in rural parts of the township until the 1960s.

Some of the first settlers were Robert & Rhoda Smiley in the 1780s. Jenner Crossroads, the township's first substantial European settlement, grew near a grist mill and tavern stop established about 1800 along the Pennsylvania Road. Samuel Steel built a sawmill at Jenner Crossroads in 1817; John Shoupwood opened a hotel in 1825, and Samuel Elder opened the first store in 1836. Other early industry in the township included a sawmill on Quemahoning Creek built about 1813 by Moses Fream and a small woolen mill, built in 1817 by William Dalley, enlarged by Owen and William Morgan later into a small settlement known as Morgantown. A Lutheran church was built in the township in 1814, a Methodist Episcopal church in 1827, a Reformed church in 1841, and a United Brethren church in 1849.

Jenners, Ralphton, Acosta and Gray were each built shortly after 1900 as company towns by Consolidation Coal, a Rockefeller interest, for its newly opened deep coal mines. Immigrants from Poland, Italy, Russia, Ruthenia, Wales, and Ireland filled the coal towns. The Somerset Coal Strike of 1922–1923 centered in these towns, and nearby Boswell, Jerome and Windber. The strike, which ultimately failed in its goal to unionize miners, drew significant nationwide attention for the hardships suffered by local miners. By the 1960s, the deep mines had closed. The town of Randolph was also a very small coal mining community in Jenner Township, any trace of which is now virtually gone, having been destroyed by highway construction in 1970.

Surface mining and some deep mining of coal continues in the immediate area. Farming, timber harvest and tourism are also mainstays of the local economy. Jenner Township also serves as a bedroom community for the nearby Somerset and Johnstown areas.

The Bridge in Jenner Township and Matthew Hair Farm are listed on the National Register of Historic Places.

== Notable person ==
- Joseph Darby, who in 2004 exposed the Abu Ghraib torture and prisoner abuse in Iraq
