= Mines Rescue Rules, 1985 =

Indian law

The Mines Rescue Rules, 1985 came into force with effect from 2 April 1985 in India, replacing the previous Coal Mines Rescue Rules, 1959, to provide for rescue of work persons in the event of explosion, fire etc. in the Mines.

These rules apply to coal and metalliferous underground mines to provide for the establishment of rescue stations and conduct of rescue work. In case of explosion or fire, an inrush of water or influx of gases, services of specially trained men with special rescue apparatuses are required.

== Salient features ==
Chapter I - Preliminary

Chapter II - Rescue Stations and Rescue Rooms

Chapter III - Duties and Responsibilities of Superintendents etc.

Chapter IV - Organisation and Equipment in Mines

Chapter V - Conduct of Rescue Work

Chapter VI – Miscellaneous

== See also ==
- Coal Mines Regulation Act 1908
- Quecreek Mine rescue
