= Gas testing examination =

Indian examination for mining safety jobs

- Abbreviation: GT
- Type: Government of India, भारत सरकार
- Purpose: Obtaining Statutory Certificates from DGMS
- Headquarters: D.G.M.S Dhanbad, India
- Location: D.G.M.S Office
- Region served: India
- Website: dgms.gov.in

The Directorate General of Mines Safety (DGMS) (हिंदी: खान सुरक्षा महानिदेशालय) is India's Ministry for Mining Safety related with Ministry of Labour and Employment. DGMS held statutory examinations for First Class Mines Manager Competency Certificates, Second Class Mines Manager Competency Certificates, Overman, Foreman, Mines mate, Sardar, and Gas Testing Examination. Gas Testing Certificate is necessary for applying for all statutory posts related to mining.

== Need of Gas Testing Examination ==
A person working below ground must have knowledge of mine gases and dealing with them. DGMS made this mandatory for passing this exam. All mine managers, over man, foreman, sardar who are applying for competency certificate they also have to submit Gas Testing Exam Passing Certificate with application form. to secure their life for future.

== Procedure for Gas Testing Examination ==
There are two examiners in this exam. The whole exam is divided in two parts. One examiner will be a manager of mine and the other will be a mine inspector (DGMS).

=== First Examiner (Manager of mine) ===
1. Method of gas testing in an underground mine
2. Right method of checking methane by safety lamp.

=== Second Examiner (Mining Inspector) ===
1. Flame safety lamp components and their functions
2. Change in flame on different percentage of gas
3. Rules and regulation related to Safety Lamp, Gases, etc.

== Qualification for appearing in Gas Testing Examination ==
1. Age must be more than 20 years
2. He must have lamp handling certificate issued from VTC or any Underground Mine.
3. He must have paid exam fee Rs. 300/- to DGMS by bharat kosh online tranjection
4. Certificate of Age: he must have to submit age certificate i.e. SSC School Certificate
5. Medical certificate form of fitness: Fitness certificate from doctor.
6. Character certificate from colliery manager or principal or any government sector .
