= Quemahoning Township, Pennsylvania =

Township in Pennsylvania, US

Coordinates: 40°06′00″N 79°00′29″W

Quemahoning Township, Somerset County, Pennsylvania
- Township
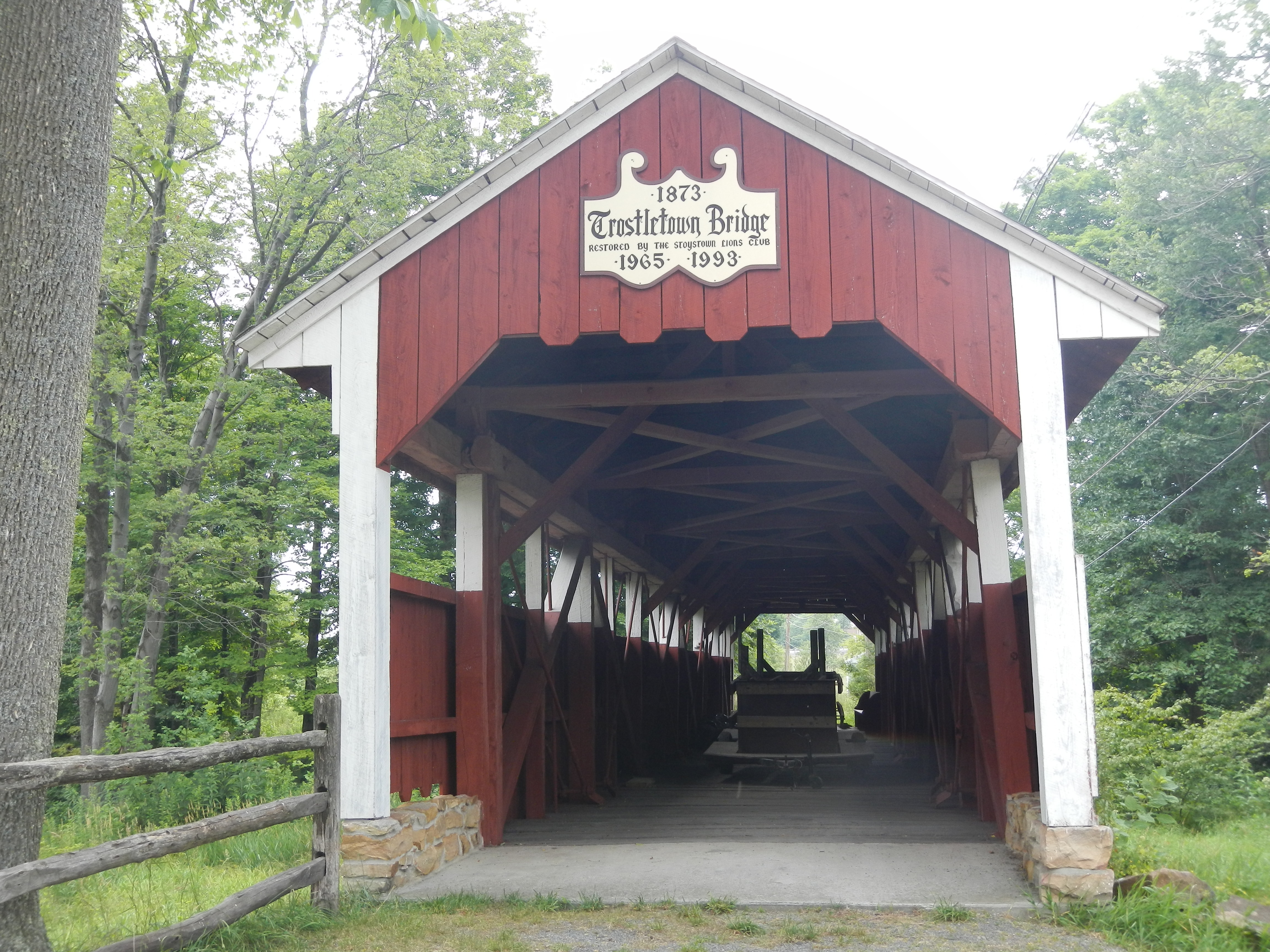
- Trostletown Covered Bridge

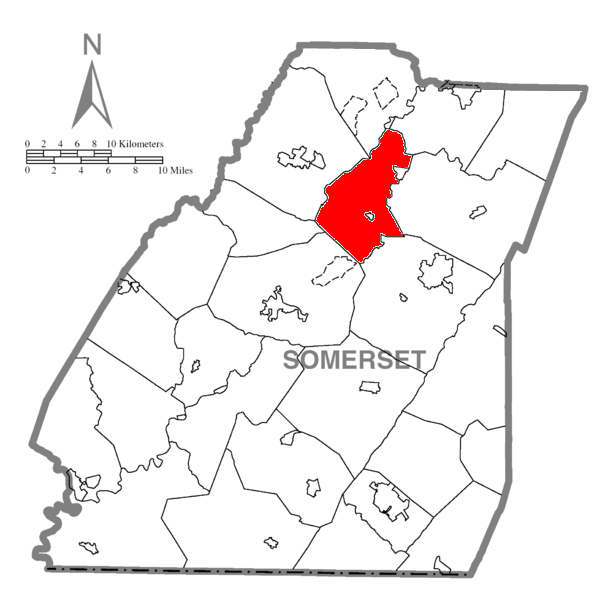
- Map of Somerset County, Pennsylvania Highlighting Quemahoning Township

- Map of Somerset County, Pennsylvania
- Country: United States
- State: Pennsylvania
- County: Somerset

Area
  - Total: 35.75 sq mi (92.59 km^{2})
  - Land: 35.10 sq mi (90.90 km^{2})
  - Water: 0.65 sq mi (1.69 km^{2})

Population (2020)
  - Total: 1,838 ▼
  - Estimate (2021): 1,826
  - Density: 55.5/sq mi (21.44/km^{2})
- Time zone: UTC-5 (Eastern (EST))
  - Summer (DST): UTC-4 (EDT)
- FIPS code: 42-111-63144

Quemahoning Township is a township in Somerset County, Pennsylvania, United States. The population was 1,838 at the 2020 census. It is part of the Johnstown, Pennsylvania, Metropolitan Statistical Area.

== History ==
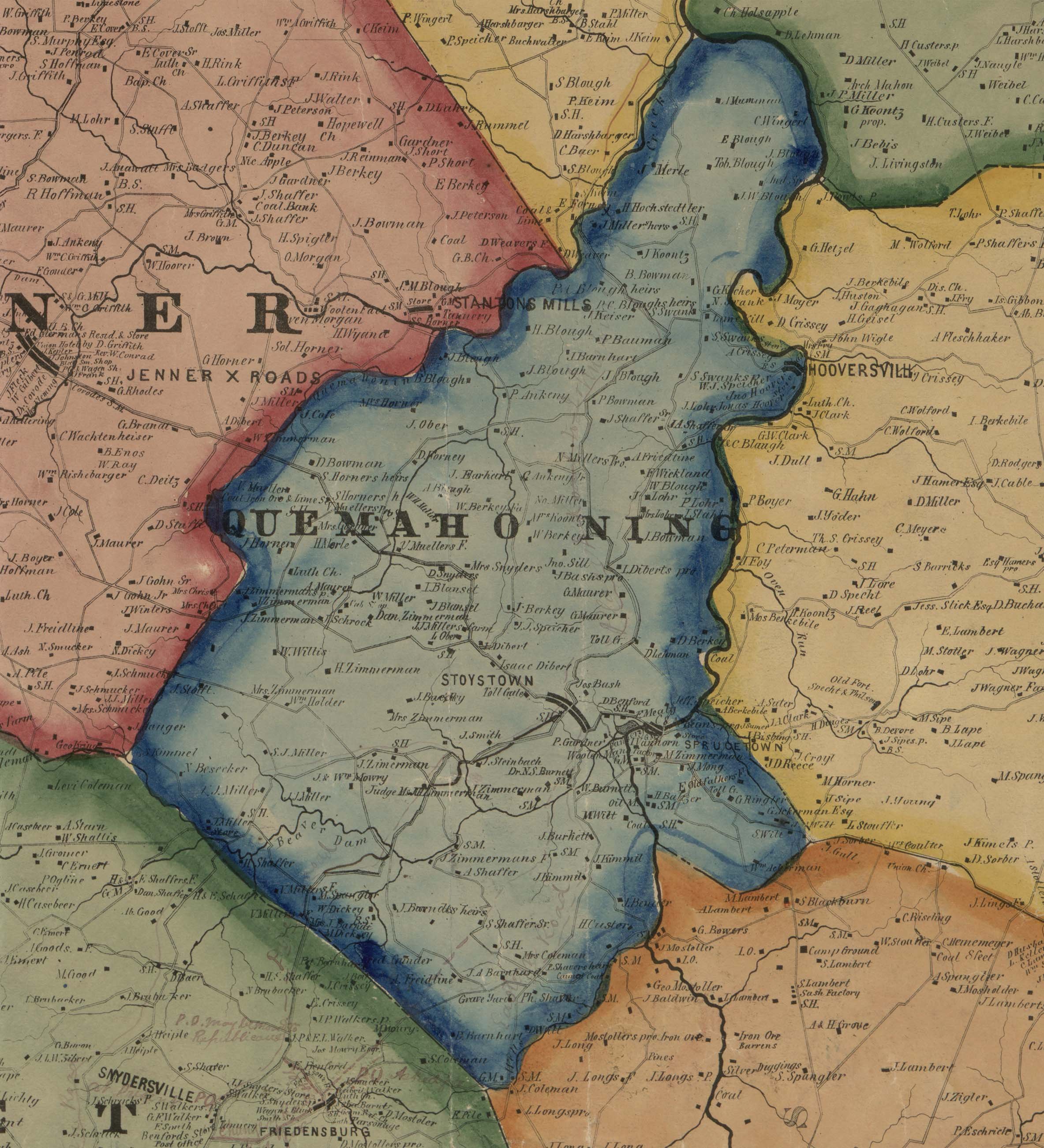
Quemahoning Township, Somerset County, Pennsylvania, 1860

In 1775, Quemahoning Township was organized, by the Bedford County Court, out of part of Brothersvalley and Turkeyfoot townships. At that time, it included the northern portion of present-day Somerset County and part of what is now Cambria County. Its size was later reduced through the formation of new townships. When Somerset County was established in 1795 Quemahoning was one of the six original townships. The name is a Native American name meaning "pine tree lick," with "cuuni" indicating a pine grove and "mahoni" meaning water from a lick.

The Trostletown Bridge was added to the National Register of Historic Places in 1980.

== Geography ==
According to the United States Census Bureau, the township has a total area of 36.2 square miles (93.7 km^{2}), of which 35.6 square miles (92.1 km^{2}) is land and 0.6 square miles (1.6 km^{2}) (1.74%) is water.

It is bordered on the west by Jenner Township, on the north by Conemaugh Township and Paint Township, on the east by Shade Township, and on the south by Stonycreek Township and Somerset Township. Quemahoning Township's eastern border is formed by the Stonycreek River and the north-western border by Quemahoning Creek, from which the township got its name; "Quemahoning" is an Indian word meaning "water issuing from a lick." Quemahoning Township surrounds the borough of Stoystown, and the borough of Hooversville sits on the eastern edge of Quemahoning Township, along its border with Shade Township.

== Demographics ==
Historical population
Census	Pop.	Note	%±
2010	2,025		—
2020	1,838		−9.2%
2021 (est.)	1,826		−0.7%
U.S. Decennial Census

As of the census of 2000, there were 2,180 people, 827 households, and 627 families residing in the township. The population density was 61.3 inhabitants per square mile (23.7/km^{2}). There were 897 housing units at an average density of 25.2/sq mi (9.7/km^{2}). The racial makeup of the township was 99.54% White, 0.05% African American, 0.09% Native American, 0.05% Asian, 0.05% from other races, and 0.23% from two or more races. Hispanic or Latino of any race were 0.37% of the population.

There were 827 households, out of which 31.8% had children under the age of 18 living with them, 63.4% were married couples living together, 8.1% had a female householder with no husband present, and 24.1% were non-families. 21.5% of all households were made up of individuals, and 10.2% had someone living alone who was 65 years of age or older. The average household size was 2.64 and the average family size was 3.06.

In the township the population was spread out, with 25.5% under the age of 18, 7.9% from 18 to 24, 27.3% from 25 to 44, 26.0% from 45 to 64, and 13.3% who were 65 years of age or older. The median age was 38 years. For every 100 females there were 99.6 males. For every 100 females age 18 and over, there were 96.8 males.

The median income for a household in the township was $32,134, and the median income for a family was $37,500. Males had a median income of $27,000 versus $20,096 for females. The per capita income for the township was $14,002. About 9.1% of families and 12.5% of the population were below the poverty line, including 16.3% of those under age 18 and 10.1% of those age 65 or over.

== See also ==
- Quemahoning Reservoir
