= Acosta, Pennsylvania =

Unincorporated community in Pennsylvania, US

- Unincorporated community
- Location within Pennsylvania
- Coordinates: 40°06′37″N 79°04′08″W
- Country: United States
- State: Pennsylvania
- County: Somerset
- Elevation: 1,860 ft (570 m)
- Time zone: UTC-5 (Eastern (EST))
  - Summer (DST): UTC-4 (EDT)
- ZIP code: 15520
- Area code: 814
- GNIS feature ID: 1168053

Acosta is an unincorporated community in Somerset County, Pennsylvania, United States. The community is 7 miles (11 km) north of Somerset. Acosta has a post office, with ZIP code 15520, which opened on January 28, 1909.

== Demographics ==
Historical population
Census	Pop.	Note	%±

The United States Census Bureau defined Acosta as a census designated place (CDP) in 2023.
