= Somerset Township, Somerset County, Pennsylvania =

Township in Pennsylvania, US

Coordinates: 40°02′00″N 79°07′59″W

- Township
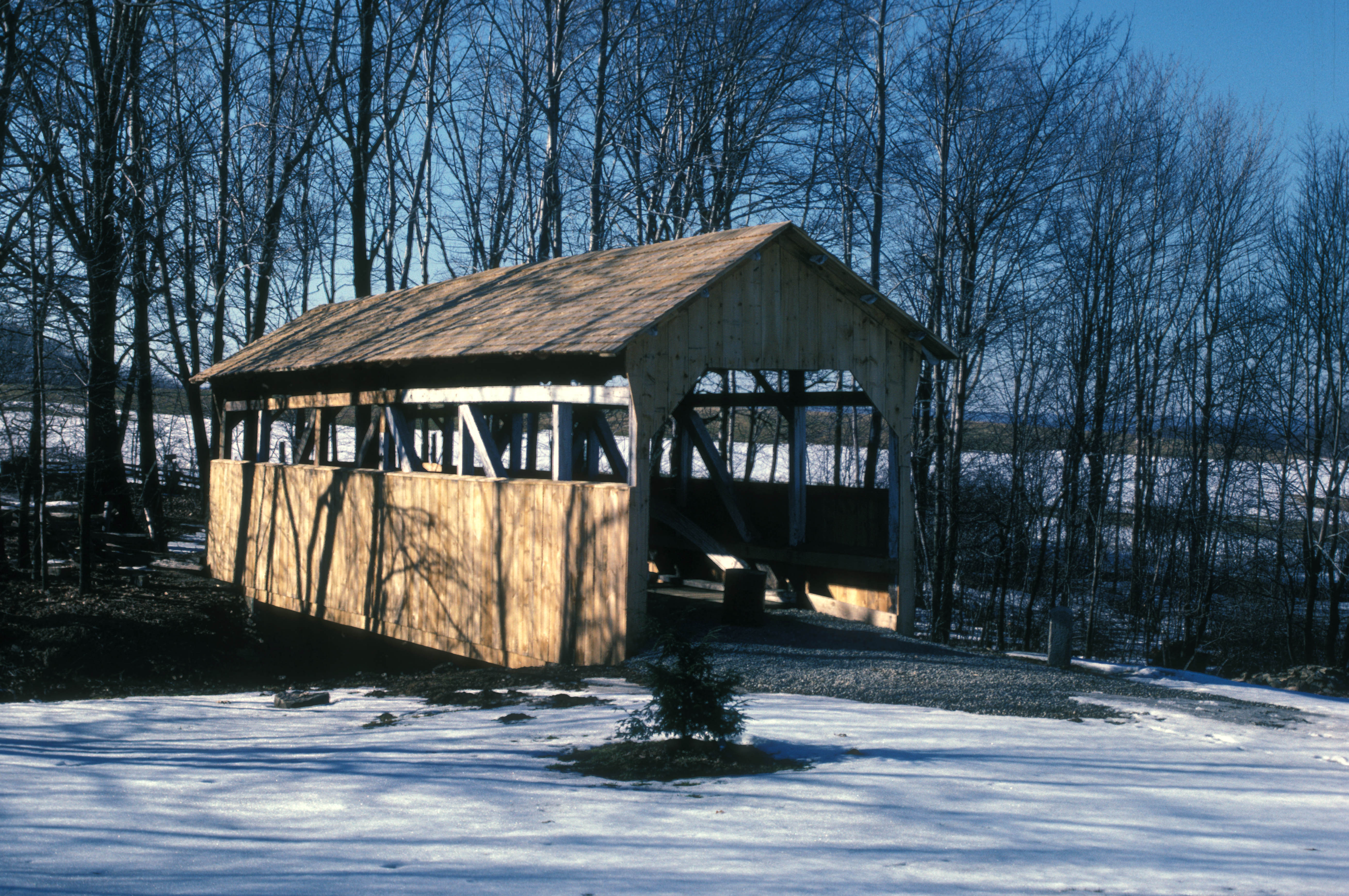
- Walter's Mill Covered Bridge

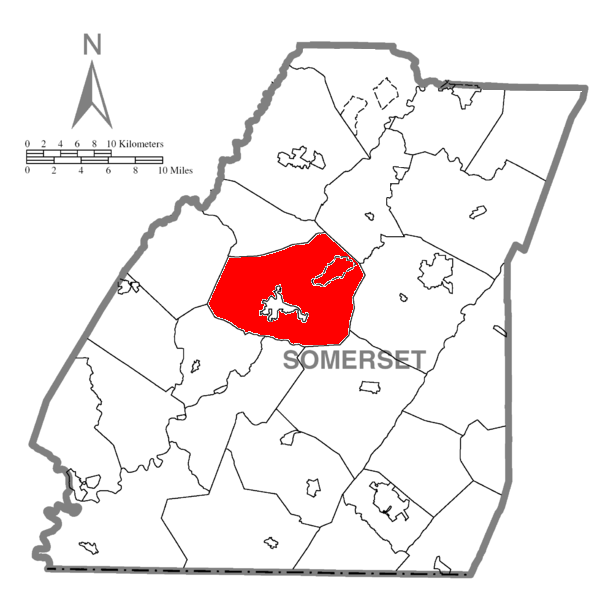
- Map of Somerset County, Pennsylvania Highlighting Somerset Township

- Map of Somerset County, Pennsylvania
- Country: United States
- State: Pennsylvania
- County: Somerset

Area
  - Total: 64.63 sq mi (167.39 km^{2})
  - Land: 64.20 sq mi (166.29 km^{2})
  - Water: 0.42 sq mi (1.10 km^{2})

Population (2020)
  - Total: 12,165 ▲
  - Estimate (2021): 12,093
  - Density: 190.5/sq mi (73.55/km^{2})
- Time zone: UTC-5 (Eastern (EST))
  - Summer (DST): UTC-4 (EDT)
- FIPS code: 42-111-71784
- Website: https://www.somersettownshippa.com/

Somerset Township is a township in Somerset County, Pennsylvania, United States. The population was 12,165 at the 2020 census. It is part of the Johnstown, Pennsylvania, Metropolitan Statistical Area and encompasses the census-designated place (CDP) of Friedens.

== History ==
Somerset Township was formed from the northern portion of Milford Township and a southern portion of Quemahoning Township in 1796. Jefferson Township was separated from Somerset Township in 1847. Other townships and boroughs were also separated, reducing the township to its current boundaries.

The Walter's Mill Bridge and Daniel B. Zimmerman Mansion are listed on the National Register of Historic Places.

== Geography ==
According to the United States Census Bureau, the township has a total area of 64.3 square miles (166.6 km^{2}), of which 63.9 square miles (165.5 km^{2}) is land and 0.4 square miles (1.1 km^{2}) (0.67%) is water. Somerset Township is bordered by Quemahoning Township to the northeast, Stonycreek Township to the east, Brothersvalley Township to the southeast, Black Township to the south, Milford Township to the southwest, Jefferson Township to the west, and Lincoln Township to the northwest.

== Demographics ==
Historical population
Census	Pop.	Note	%±
2000	9,319		—
2010	12,122		30.1%
2020	12,165		0.4%
2021 (est.)	12,093		−0.6%
U.S. Decennial Census

At the 2000 census there were 9,319 people, 3,484 households, and 2,574 families in the township. The population density was 145.8 inhabitants per square mile (56.3/km^{2}). There were 3,699 housing units at an average density of 57.9 per square mile (22.4/km^{2}). The racial makeup of the township was 97.20% White, 1.48% African American, 0.06% Native American, 0.54% Asian, 0.34% from other races, and 0.38% from two or more races. Hispanic or Latino of any race were 0.49%.

Of the 3,484 households 32.0% had children under the age of 18 living with them, 63.3% were married couples living together, 7.2% had a female householder with no husband present, and 26.1% were non-families. 22.5% of households were one person and 10.5% were one person aged 65 or older. The average household size was 2.52 and the average family size was 2.95.

The age distribution was 23.1% under the age of 18, 7.3% from 18 to 24, 28.9% from 25 to 44, 24.4% from 45 to 64, and 16.3% 65 or older. The median age was 40 years. For every 100 females there were 104.4 males. For every 100 females age 18 and over, there were 103.0 males.

The median household income was $33,391 and the median family income was $37,006. Males had a median income of $28,007 versus $21,707 for females. The per capita income for the township was $16,510. About 7.5% of families and 9.2% of the population were below the poverty line, including 11.6% of those under age 18 and 6.3% of those age 65 or over.

== Government and infrastructure ==
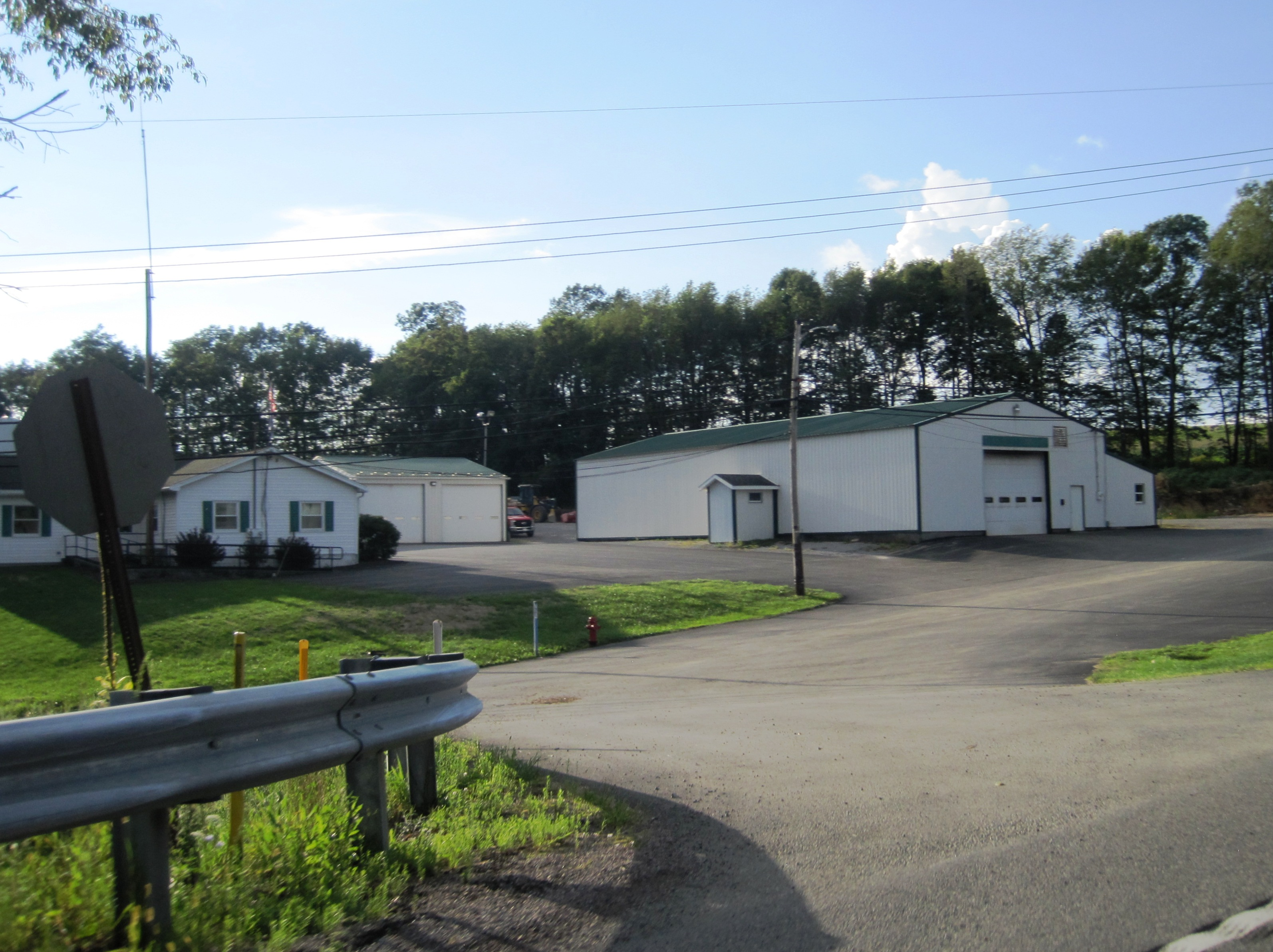
Somerset Town Hall

Almost all of State Correctional Institution – Somerset is in the township.

== Education ==
The township is in Somerset Area School District.

== Notable person ==
- Marshall I. Ludington, Quartermaster General of the United States Army
