= Somerset Historical Center =

Rural history museum in Somerset, Pennsylvania

Coordinates: 40.0706°N 79.0816°W

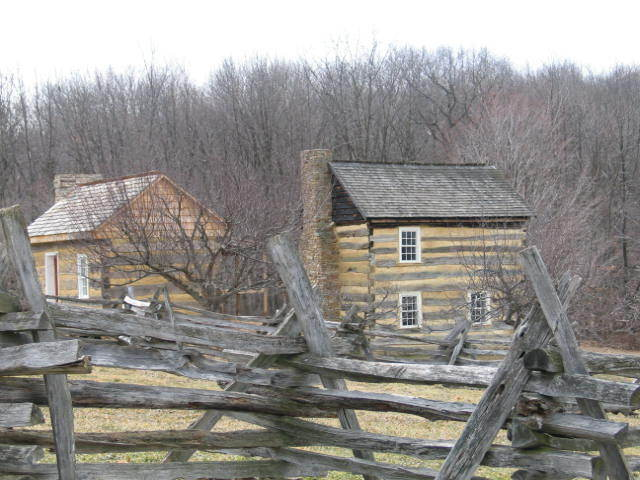
The 1830s Farmstead at the Somerset Historical Center

The Somerset Historical Center is a rural history museum for the southwestern part of the U.S. State of Pennsylvania and is 4 miles (6 km) north of Somerset. The museum is part of the Pennsylvania Historical and Museum Commission.
