= National Register of Historic Places listings in Somerset County, Pennsylvania =

Location of Somerset County in Pennsylvania

This is a list of the National Register of Historic Places listings in Somerset County, Pennsylvania.

This is intended to be a complete list of the properties and districts on National Register of Historic Places in Somerset County, Pennsylvania. The locations of National Register properties and districts for which the latitude and longitude coordinates are included below, may be seen in a map.

There are 32 properties and districts listed on the National Register in the county. One site is designated as a National Historic Site.

This National Park Service list is complete through NPS recent listings posted May 1, 2026.

== Current listings ==
	Name on the Register	Image	Date listed	Location	Municipality	Description
1	Barronvale Bridge	Barronvale Bridge	December 11, 1980 (#80003633)	West of Somerset off Legislative Route 55118; 39°57′10″N 79°16′14″W	Middlecreek Township	
2	Beechdale Bridge	Beechdale Bridge	December 10, 1980 (#80003628)	Southwest of Berlin off U.S. Route 219; 39°52′54″N 79°02′05″W	Brothersvalley Township	
3	W. Bollman and Company Bridge	W. Bollman and Company Bridge	November 8, 1978 (#78002471)	Great Allegheny Passage trail over Scratch Hill Road; 39°49′06″N 78°59′41″W	Summit Township	Relocated in 2007.
4	Boswell Historic District	Boswell Historic District	June 3, 1994 (#94000519)	Roughly bounded by Hower Avenue, Atkinson Way, Quemahoning Creek, Main Street, and Juniata Street; 40°09′47″N 79°01′40″W	Boswell	
5	Bridge in Jenner Township	Bridge in Jenner Township	June 22, 1988 (#88000853)	Legislative Route 55125 over Roaring Run; 40°10′18″N 79°00′49″W	Jenner Township	
6	Cairnbrook Historic District	Cairnbrook Historic District	June 3, 1994 (#94000523)	Roughly bounded by the Penn Central railroad tracks, McGregor Avenue, Windber Avenue and John Street; 40°07′20″N 78°48′59″W	Shade Township	
7	Flight 93 National Memorial	Flight 93 National Memorial	November 8, 2002 (#04000272)	West of Sky Line Road, Shanksville vicinity 40°03′03″N 78°54′13″W	Stonycreek Township	
8	Fort Dewart		January 7, 2021 (#100005989)	Address Restricted	Allegheny Township	see https://pahistoricpreservation.com/defending-fort-dewart-legacy-stewardship/
9	Glessner Bridge	Glessner Bridge	December 10, 1980 (#80003631)	Northwest of Shanksville off Legislative Route 55068; 40°01′33″N 78°55′16″W	Stonycreek Township	
10	Matthew Hair Farm	Matthew Hair Farm	October 24, 1996 (#96001207)	Off Pennsylvania Route 601, 1 mile (1.6 km) north of Boswell; 40°11′13″N 78°59′56″W	Jenner Township	
11	Hite House	Hite House	November 23, 1998 (#98001428)	121 West Main Street; 40°06′13″N 78°57′17″W	Stoystown	
12	King's Bridge	King's Bridge	December 11, 1980 (#80003632)	West of Somerset off Pennsylvania Route 653; 39°56′15″N 79°16′17″W	Middlecreek Township	
13	Kooser State Park Family Cabin District	Kooser State Park Family Cabin District	February 12, 1987 (#87000111)	10 miles (16 km) north of Pennsylvania Turnpike Exit 10 on Pennsylvania Route 31; 40°03′39″N 79°13′49″W	Jefferson Township	
14	Laurel Hill RDA	Laurel Hill RDA	May 18, 1987 (#87000738)	4 miles (6.4 km) west of New Centerville and Pennsylvania Route 281; 39°59′55″N 79°14′12″W	Middlecreek Township	
15	Lower Humbert Bridge	Lower Humbert Bridge	December 10, 1980 (#80003638)	North of Ursina off Legislative Route 55030; 39°50′24″N 79°19′23″W	Lower Turkeyfoot Township	
16	Miller's Store	Miller's Store	July 24, 1992 (#92000948)	Junction of Pennsylvania Routes 3029 and 3033; 39°59′11″N 79°14′28″W	Middlecreek Township	
17	New Baltimore Bridge	New Baltimore Bridge	December 10, 1980 (#80003630)	Off Juniata Street over the Raystown Branch Juniata River; 39°59′13″N 78°46′21″W	Allegheny Township and New Baltimore	
18	New Colonial Hotel	New Colonial Hotel	May 10, 2005 (#05000411)	319 Main Street; 39°48′55″N 79°01′30″W	Meyersdale	
19	Packsaddle Bridge	Packsaddle Bridge	December 10, 1980 (#80003629)	Pack Saddle Road over Brush Creek; 39°52′04″N 78°49′03″W	Fairhope Township	
20	Petersburg Tollhouse	Petersburg Tollhouse	March 20, 1979 (#79002346)	Off U.S. Route 40; 39°44′47″N 79°20′06″W	Addison	
21	Second National Bank of Meyersdale	Second National Bank of Meyersdale	February 20, 2002 (#02000068)	151 Center Street; 39°48′53″N 79°01′33″W	Meyersdale	
22	Shade Furnace Archaeological District	Shade Furnace Archaeological District	January 10, 2008 (#07001380)	North of Rockingham above Dark Shade Creek; 40°09′11″N 78°49′42″W	Shade Township	
23	Shaffer's Bridge	Shaffer's Bridge	December 10, 1980 (#80003637)	West of Tire Hill on Township 634; 40°16′52″N 78°57′52″W	Conemaugh Township	
24	Somerset County Courthouse	Somerset County Courthouse	June 27, 1980 (#80003634)	East Union Street and North Center Avenue; 40°00′35″N 79°04′41″W	Somerset	
25	Stoystown Historic District	Stoystown Historic District	September 7, 2001 (#01000605)	Roughly bounded by West and East Forbes Roads, East Main Street, Meadow Street, East Penn Avenue, South Sommerset Street, West Penn Avenue and West Main Street; 40°06′09″N 78°57′16″W	Stoystown	
26	Trostletown Bridge	Trostletown Bridge	December 11, 1980 (#80003636)	Southeast of Stoystown off U.S. Route 30; 40°05′45″N 78°56′44″W	Quemahoning Township	
27	Uptown Somerset Historic District	Uptown Somerset Historic District	November 7, 1995 (#95001254)	Roughly bounded by North Kimbery, Main, Columbia, and West Catherine Streets; 40°00′37″N 79°04′48″W	Somerset	
28	Wable-Augustine Tavern	Wable-Augustine Tavern	November 27, 1995 (#95001353)	U.S. Route 40, approximately 1 mile (1.6 km) east of Addison; 39°44′04″N 79°19′08″W	Addison Township	
29	Walter's Mill Bridge	Walter's Mill Bridge	December 10, 1980 (#80003635)	North of Somerset off Pennsylvania Route 985; 40°03′56″N 79°04′40″W	Somerset Township	
30	Windber Historic District	Windber Historic District	November 14, 1991 (#91001705)	Roughly bounded by the borough line, Cambria Avenue, 28th Street, and the Big Paint Creek; 40°14′10″N 78°49′55″W	Paint and Windber	Extends into Cambria County
31	Penrose Wolf Building	Penrose Wolf Building	September 13, 2002 (#02000967)	450 Main Street; 39°54′50″N 79°09′28″W	Rockwood	
32	Daniel B. Zimmerman Mansion	Daniel B. Zimmerman Mansion	February 24, 1995 (#95000129)	800 Georgian Place Drive; 40°01′17″N 79°04′28″W	Somerset Township	

== See also ==
- List of Pennsylvania state historical markers in Somerset County
