= List of Pennsylvania state historical markers in Somerset County =

Location of Somerset County in Pennsylvania

This is a list of the Pennsylvania state historical markers in Somerset County.

This is intended to be a complete list of the official state historical markers placed in Somerset County, Pennsylvania by the Pennsylvania Historical and Museum Commission (PHMC). The locations of the historical markers, as well as the latitude and longitude coordinates as provided by the PHMC's database, are included below when available. There are 31 historical markers located in Somerset County.

== Historical markers ==
Marker title	Image	Date dedicated	Location	Marker type	Topics
Adam Schneider		June 28, 1954	NW corner of Square, Somerset; 40.00854°N 79.07869°W	City	Early Settlement, Professions & Vocations
Alan Freed (1921-1965)		September 6, 2003	Miner’s Park, near corner of Graham Ave. and 13th Street, Windber; 40.2365°N 78.8323°W	Roadside	African American, Motion Pictures & Television, Music & Theater, Performers, Professions & Vocations
Ankeny Square		June 28, 1954	Patriot Square at cemetery, Somerset; 40.00747°N 79.082°W	City	Religion
Berlin		September 29, 1994	600 Main St., at Trinity U.C.C., Somerset. 39.9205°N 78.9566°W	Roadside	Government & Politics, Government & Politics 18th Century, Military, Whiskey Rebellion
Early Bible		May 13, 1954	151 W Main St., Somerset; 40.0084°N 79.0802°W	Roadside	Religion
Flora Black		October 18, 1989	U.S. 219, 3 miles NW of Meyersdale; 39.85002°N 79.05305°W	Roadside	Government & Politics, Women
Forbes Road - Fort Dewart		January 30, 1952	U.S. 30 near Bedford County line, Somerset; 40.0387°N 78.7674°W	Roadside	Forts, French & Indian War, Military, Roads
Forbes Road (Edmunds Swamp)		January 30, 1952	U.S. 30 at Buckstown	Roadside	French & Indian War, Military, Roads, Transportation
Forbes Road (Stony Creek Encampment)		February 27, 1951	U.S. 30 E of Stoyerstown	Roadside	Forts, French & Indian War, Military, Roads, Transportation
Forbes Road (The Clear Fields)		January 30, 1952	U.S. 30 W of Jennerstown; 40.16653°N 79.0923°W	Roadside	Forts, French & Indian War, Military, Roads, Transportation
Forbes Road, 1758, Fort Bedford to Fort Duquesne - Edmond's Swamp (PLAQUE)		1930	old Central City-Buckstown Rd., ~ 2 mi. W of Central City; 40.1024°N 78.8462°W	Plaque	Forts, French & Indian War, Military, Roads
Forbes Road, 1758, Fort Bedford to Fort Duquesne - Tomahawk Encampment (PLAQUE)		1930	LR 55092, west of Jennerstown; 40.16912°N 79.0914°W	Plaque	French & Indian War, Military, Roads
Forbes Road, 1758, Fort Bedford to Fort Duquesne- Stony Creek Encampment (PLAQUE)		1930	grounds of Forbes High School, Kantner, just E of Stoystown	Plaque	French & Indian War, Military, Roads
Fort Hill		October 24, 1947	Pa. 53, 2 miles NE of Ursina (Missing)	Roadside	Early Settlement, Forts, Native American
Fort Hill		October 24, 1947	Pa. 281, 3 miles NE of Ursina; 39.83068°N 79.29455°W	Roadside	Forts, Native American
Great Crossings		October 24, 1947	U.S. 40 at Youghiogheny River	Roadside	French & Indian War, George Washington, Roads, Transportation
Harmon Husband		October 24, 1947	555 E Main St. (PA 31), Somerset; 40.0073°N 79.06807°W	Roadside	American Revolution, Early Settlement, Military, Whiskey Rebellion
Jeremiah S. Black		October 24, 1947	Pa. 31 (Glades Rd.), 6.5 miles E of Somerset near Brotherton; 39.9687°N 78.95362°W	Roadside	Government & Politics, Professions & Vocations
Jeremiah Sullivan Black - PLAQUE		n/a	PA 31, 7 miles from Somerset; 39.96887°N 78.95367°W	Plaque	Government & Politics 19th Century, Houses & Homesteads
John Christian Frederick Heyer (1793-1873)		Aug 28, 2016	Friedens Lutheran Church, 131 S Main St., Friedens 40.05036°N 78.99764°W	Roadside	Education; Religion
Johnny Weissmuller		September 13, 1999	Jefferson Avenue. Extension & Graham Ave. Windber (Pa. N. 160); 40.2341°N 78.8294°W	Roadside	Motion Pictures & Television, Sports
Laurel Hill State Park		Jul 2, 2021	At entrance of Laurel Hill State Park 40.009169°N 79.218554°W	Roadside	Environment, Government & Politics 20th Century, Sports & Recreation
Log Grist Mill		October 24, 1947	Pa. 985 (old U.S. 219), .5 mile N of Jennerstown; 40.1661°N 79.0605°W	Roadside	Buildings, Business & Industry, Mills
McKinley House		May 13, 1954	129 E. Main St., Somerset (Missing)	Roadside	Government & Politics, Government & Politics 19th Century, Houses & Homesteads
National Road		August 10, 1947	U.S. 40 SE of Addison near State line 39.7222°N 79.3053°W	Roadside	Government & Politics, Roads, Transportation
Pennsylvania		January 28, 1949	PA 219 at state line 39.7237°N 79.0873°W	Roadside	Government & Politics, Government & Politics 17th Century, William Penn
Pennsylvania		January 28, 1949	US 40 at state line 39.7222°N 79.3053°W	Roadside	Government & Politics, Government & Politics 17th Century, William Penn
Quecreek Mine Accident and Rescue		July 29, 2006	151 Haupt Rd., just off Somerset Pike (PA 985), Somerset; 40.0782°N 79.0858°W	Roadside	Coal, Government & Politics, Labor
Rural Electrification		June 10, 1989	134 Mud Pike (SR 3010), near Water Level Rd. (SR 3015), between Somerset & Rockwood (Missing); 39.9819°N 79.11°W	Roadside	Agriculture, Business & Industry, Electricity
Somerset County		October 22, 1982	County Courthouse, 111 E Union St., Somerset	City	Agriculture, Government & Politics, Government & Politics 18th Century, Roads
Toll House		October 24, 1947	US 40 at Addison; 39.7452°N 79.3313°W	Roadside	Government & Politics, Roads, Transportation
Windber		September 13, 1999	501 15th St., Windber; 40.2354°N 78.831°W	Roadside	Buildings, Business & Industry, Cities & Towns, Coal, Ethnic & Immigration, Labor
Windber Strike of 1922-23		April 1, 2003	Near Graham Ave. and 13th Street in Miner's Park, Windber; 40.2357°N 78.8313°W	Roadside	Business & Industry, Civil Rights, Coal, Government & Politics 20th Century, Labor

== See also ==
- List of Pennsylvania state historical markers
- National Register of Historic Places listings in Somerset County, Pennsylvania
