= Lower Turkeyfoot Township, Pennsylvania =

Township in Pennsylvania, US

Coordinates: 39°51′00″N 79°20′59″W

Lower Turkeyfoot Township, Somerset County, Pennsylvania
- Township
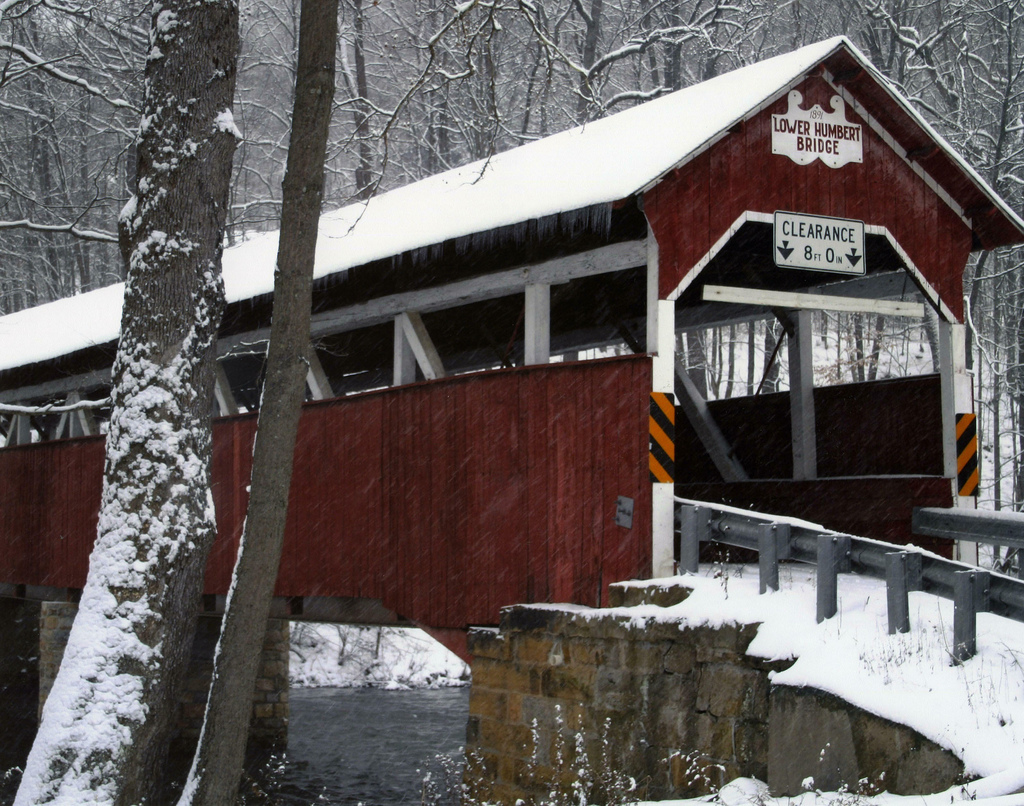
- The Lower Humbert Covered Bridge in Lower Turkeyfoot Township

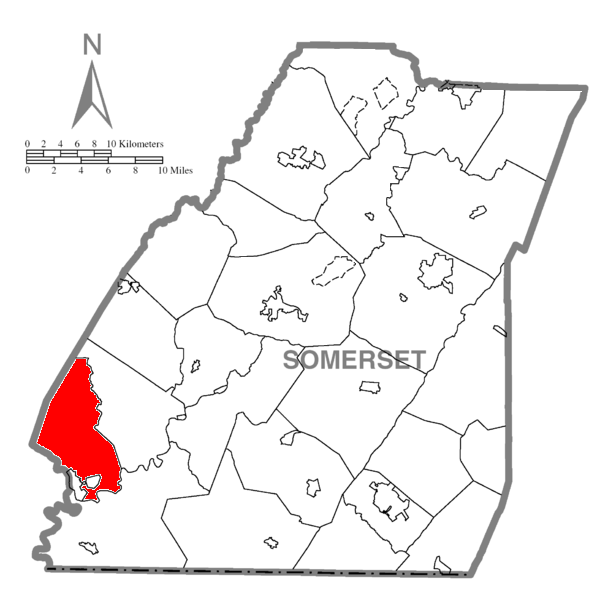
- Map of Somerset County, Pennsylvania Highlighting Lower Turkeyfoot Township

- Map of Somerset County, Pennsylvania
- Country: United States
- State: Pennsylvania
- County: Somerset

Area
  - Total: 36.26 sq mi (93.91 km^{2})
  - Land: 35.97 sq mi (93.15 km^{2})
  - Water: 0.29 sq mi (0.75 km^{2})

Population (2020)
  - Total: 543 ▼
  - Estimate (2021): 538
  - Density: 16.2/sq mi (6.24/km^{2})
- Time zone: UTC-5 (Eastern (EST))
  - Summer (DST): UTC-4 (EDT)
- FIPS code: 42-111-45136

Lower Turkeyfoot Township is a township in Somerset County, Pennsylvania, United States. The population was 543 at the 2020 census. It is part of the Johnstown, Pennsylvania, Metropolitan Statistical Area.

== History ==
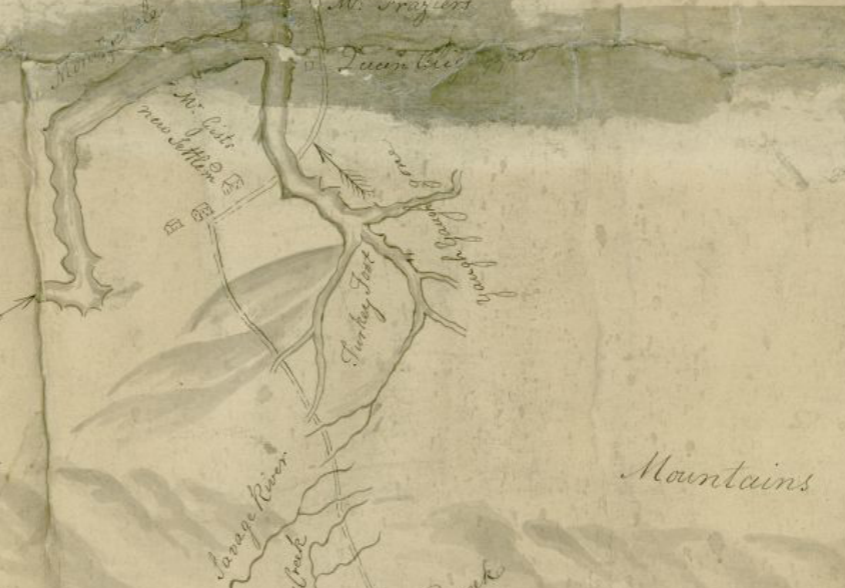
1754 map of the Confluence & Turkeyfoot region drawn by George Washington

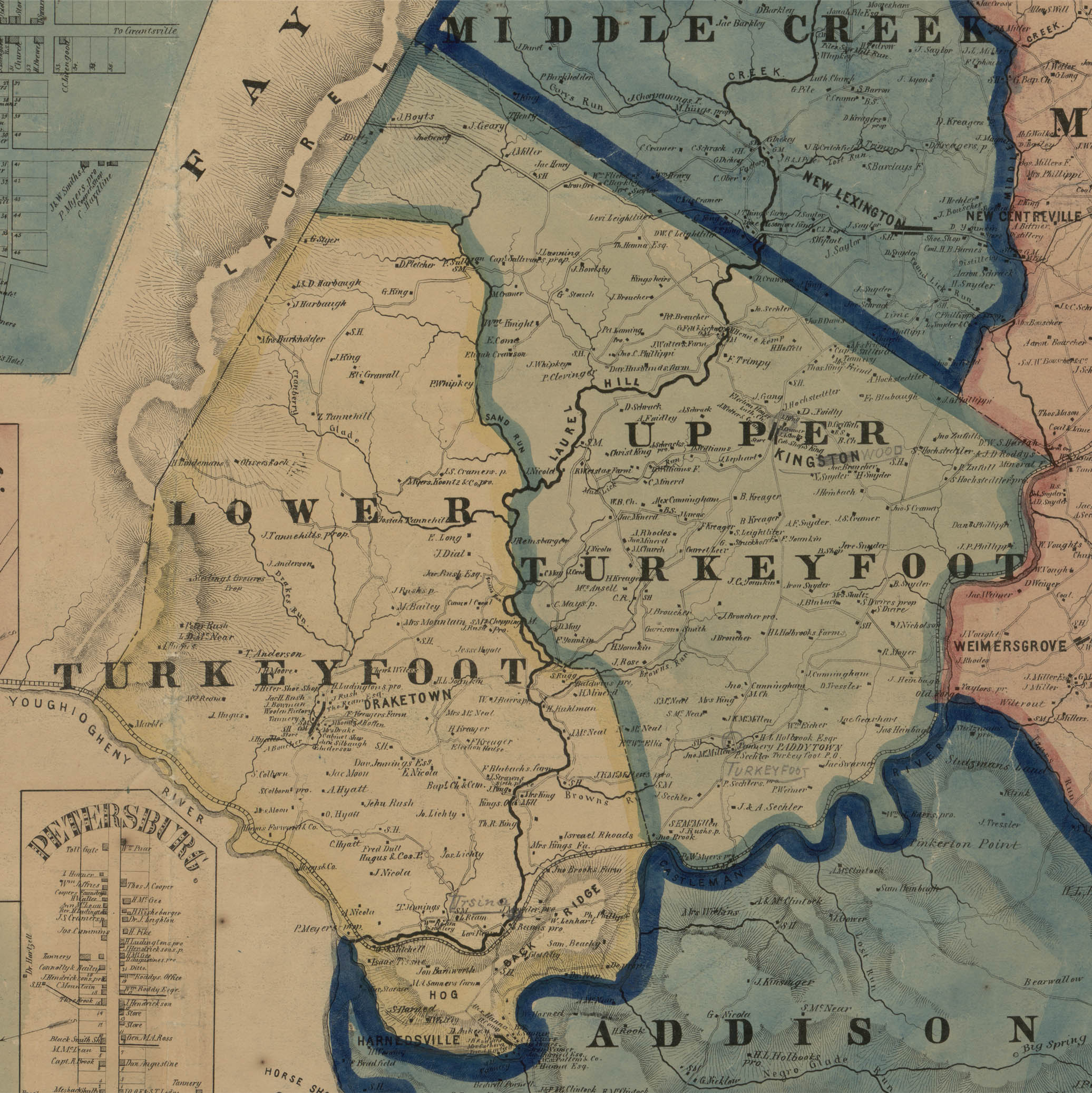
Upper & Lower Turkeyfoot Townships, Somerset County, Pennsylvania, 1860

Turkeyfoot Township was formed from part of Brothersvalley Township in 1773, when both were still part of a larger Bedford County; Somerset County was not formed from the western portion of Bedford County until 1795. Just as new counties were split off from earlier counties, new townships were split off from earlier townships, and the townships of Upper Turkeyfoot & Lower Turkeyfoot took their current shapes in 1848. White settlers arrived in the Turkeyfoot area by the late 1760s, and a group of about 15-20 Baptist families came to the area from New Jersey around 1774.

The Lower Humbert Bridge was added to the National Register of Historic Places in 1980.

== Geography ==
According to the United States Census Bureau, Lower Turkeyfoot Township has a total area of 36.3 square miles (93.9 km^{2}), of which 36.0 square miles (93.2 km^{2}) is land and 0.3 square miles (0.8 km^{2}) (0.80%) is water. The boroughs of Confluence and Ursina are located at the southern end of the township. Lower Turkeyfoot Township is bordered by Upper Turkeyfoot Township to the east, Addison Township to the southeast, and Fayette County to the west. Laurel Hill Creek flows through Lower Turkeyfoot Township, with tributaries such as Cranberry Glade Run, May Run, and Licking Run joining its stream before it enters the Casselman River in Confluence, just before the Casselman River flows into the Youghiogheny River. State Game Lands No. 111 and Cranberry Glade Lake are also located in the township.

Pennsylvania Route 281 passes through Lower Turkeyfoot Township, generally heading northeast from Confluence, passing through Ursina and the southern end of Lower Turkeyfoot Township, and then continuing into Upper Turkeyfoot Township on its way to New Lexington in Middlecreek Township.

== Demographics ==
Historical population
Census	Pop.	Note	%±
2010	603		—
2020	543		−10.0%
2021 (est.)	538		−0.9%
U.S. Decennial Census

As of the census of 2000, there were 672 people, 259 households, and 183 families residing in the township. The population density was 18.7 people per square mile (7.2/km^{2}). There were 444 housing units at an average density of 12.3/sq mi (4.8/km^{2}). The racial makeup of the township was 98.96% White, 0.74% Native American, and 0.30% from two or more races. Hispanic or Latino of any race were 0.89% of the population.

There were 259 households, out of which 25.9% had children under the age of 18 living with them, 59.8% were married couples living together, 6.9% had a female householder with no husband present, and 29.0% were non-families. 27.0% of all households were made up of individuals, and 13.9% had someone living alone who was 65 years of age or older. The average household size was 2.42 and the average family size was 2.91.

In the township the population was spread out, with 20.2% under the age of 18, 8.9% from 18 to 24, 24.9% from 25 to 44, 25.6% from 45 to 64, and 20.4% who were 65 years of age or older. The median age was 42 years. For every 100 females, there were 105.5 males. For every 100 females age 18 and over, there were 102.3 males.

The median income for a household in the township was $27,891, and the median income for a family was $30,789. Males had a median income of $29,643 versus $15,833 for females. The per capita income for the township was $12,812. About 14.6% of families and 18.0% of the population were below the poverty line, including 22.4% of those under age 18 and 14.5% of those age 65 or over.
