= Lower Humbert Covered Bridge =

Covered bridge in Pennsylvania, US

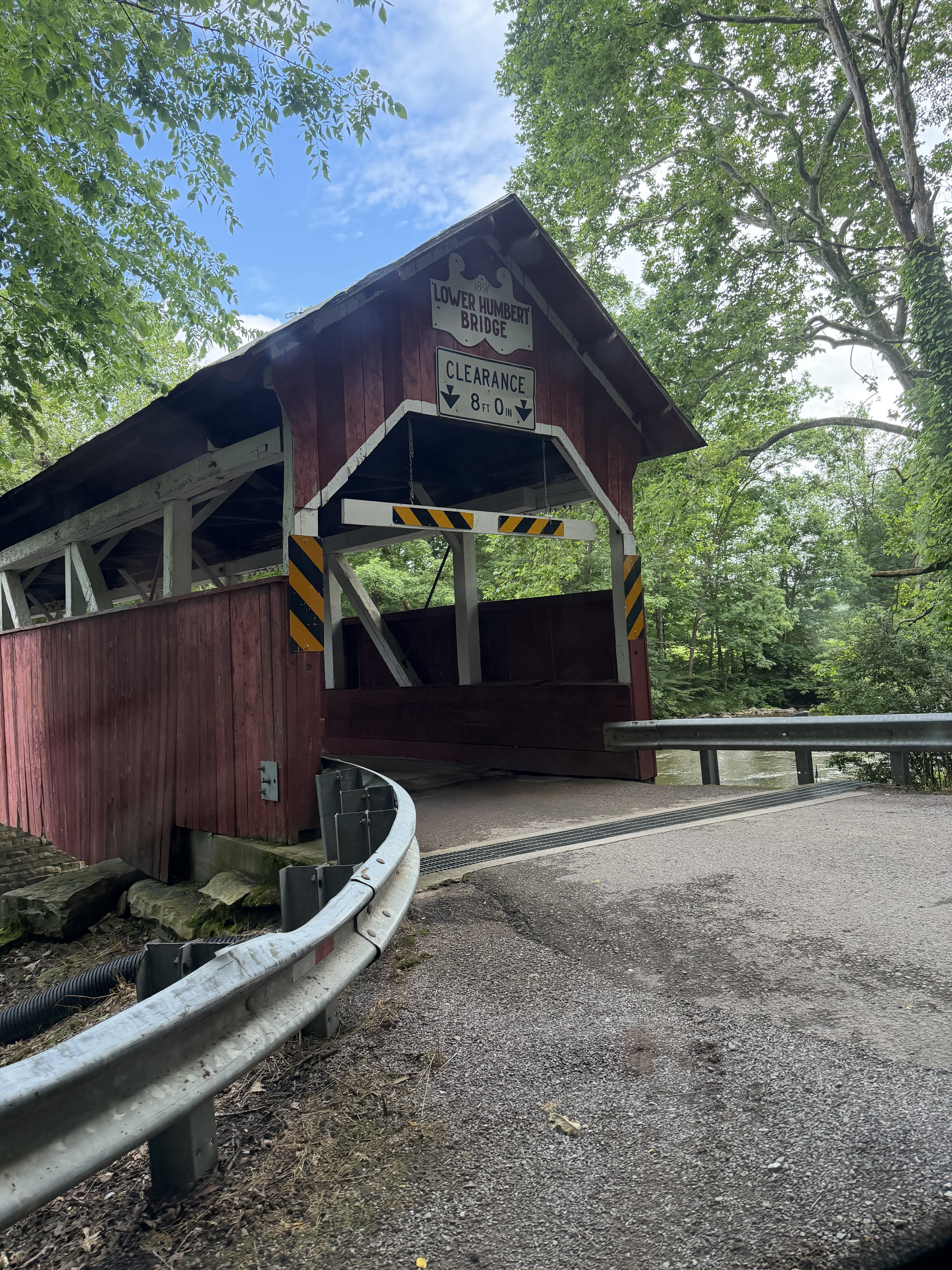
- Front view of bridge, June 2026.
- Coordinates: 39°50′24.5″N 79°19′23″W
- Carries: Township 312
- Crosses: Laurel Hill Creek
- Locale: Somerset, Pennsylvania, United States
- Other name: Faidley Covered Bridge
- Maintained by: Somerset County
- NBI Number: 557213031230350

Characteristics
- Total length: 126.5 ft (38.6 m)
- Width: 12.3 ft (3.7 m)
- Height: 8 ft (2.4 m)
- Load limit: 3 short tons (2.7 t)

History
- Built: 1891
- Lower Humbert Covered Bridge
- U.S. National Register of Historic Places
- MPS: Covered Bridges of Somerset County TR
- NRHP reference No.: 80003638
- Added to NRHP: December 10, 1980

Location
- Interactive map of Lower Humbert Covered Bridge

The Lower Humbert Covered Bridge, or the Faidley Covered Bridge, is an 126-foot-6-inch (38.56 m) Burr Arch truss covered bridge that crosses Laurel Hill Creek, in Lower Turkeyfoot Township, Somerset County in the U.S. state of Pennsylvania. It was built in 1891 and was listed on the National Register of Historic Places on December 10, 1980. It is one of the ten remaining covered bridges in Somerset County.

== History ==
The covered bridge was built in 1891. It was rebuilt in 1991, with extensive reinforcement work done on the abutments. A homemade explosive device caused minor damage to bridge deck in January 2006.

== Gallery ==
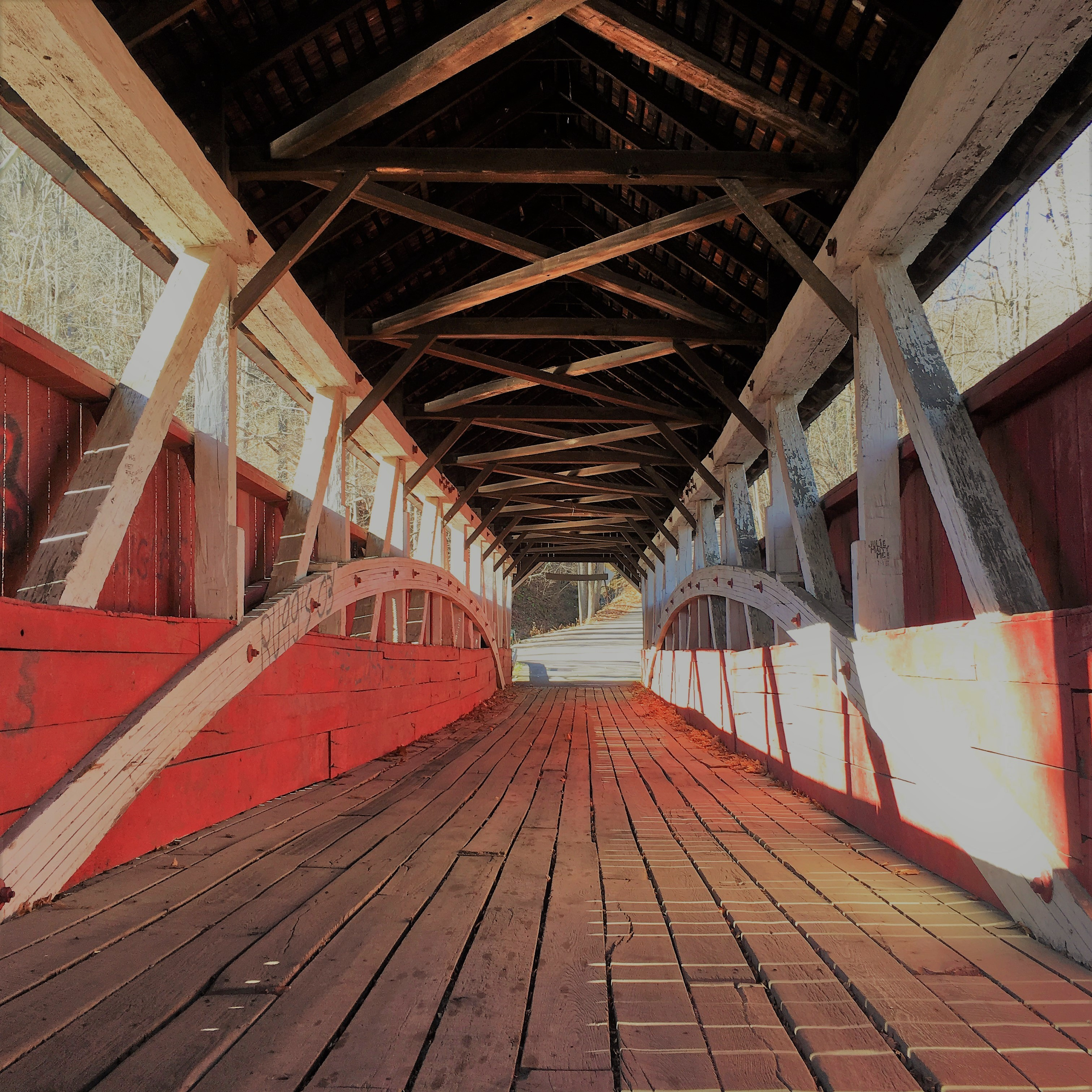
Interior view, November 2015

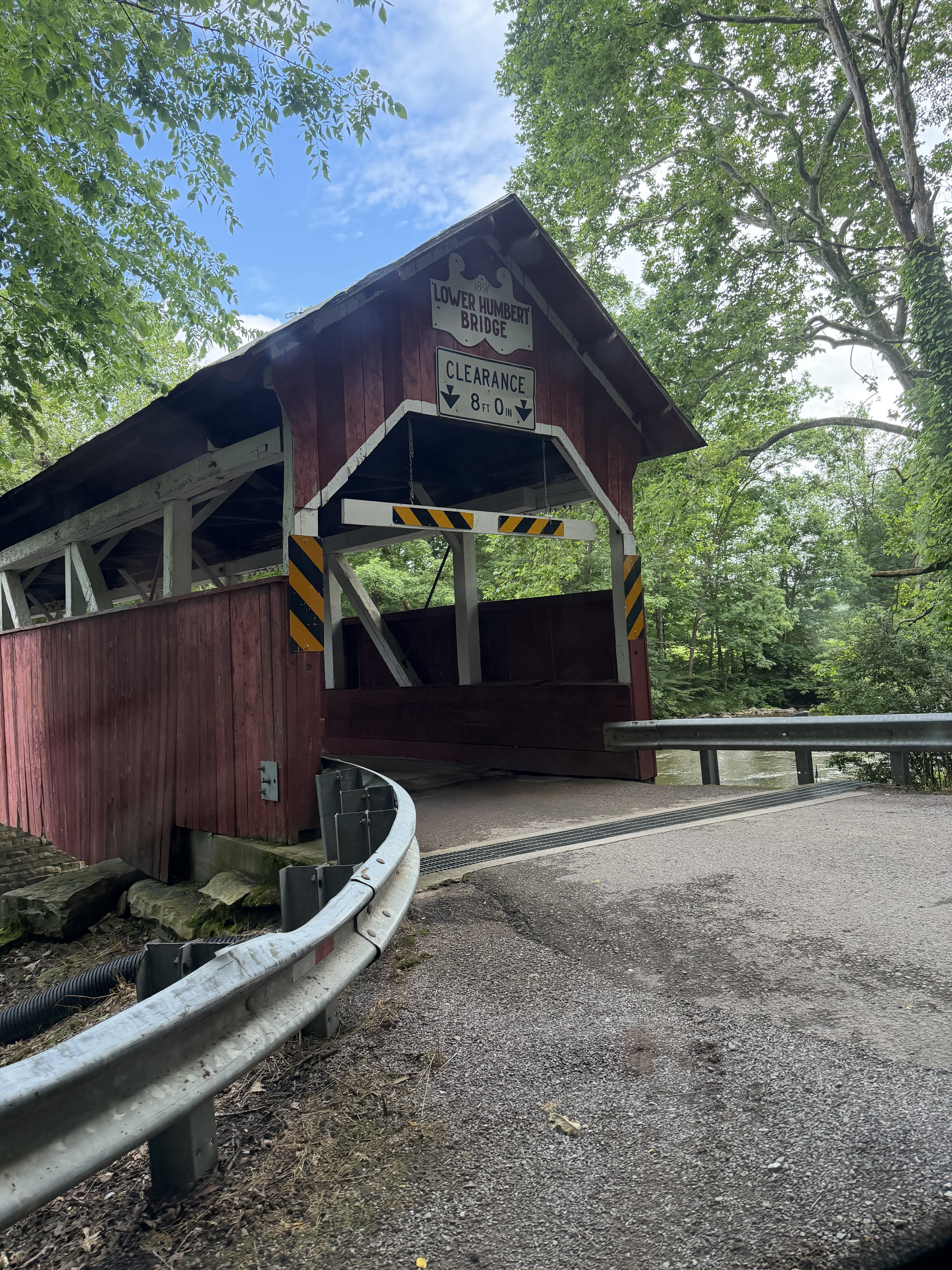
Front view, June 2026

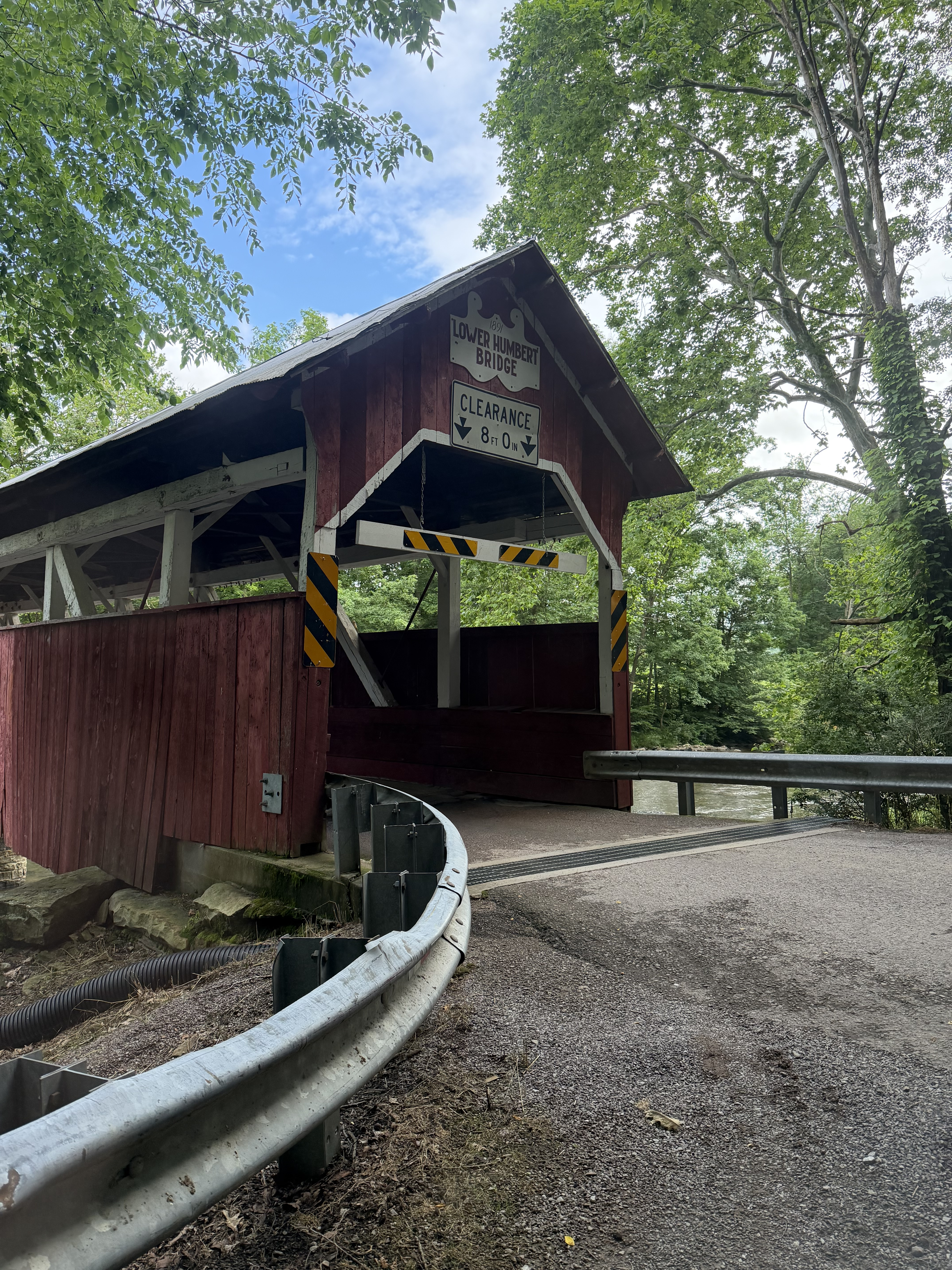
Back view, June 2026

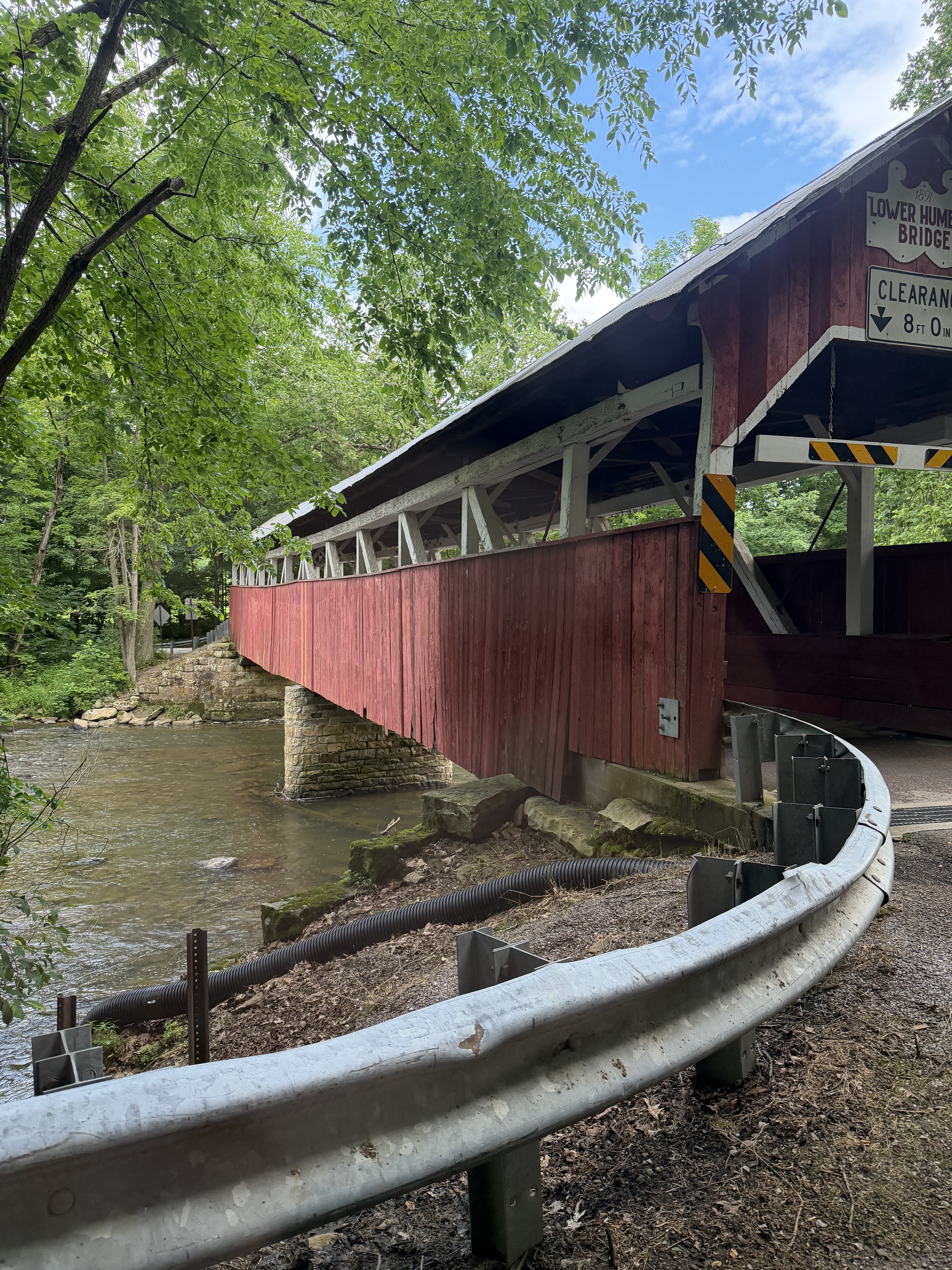
Side view of bridge and river below, June 2026

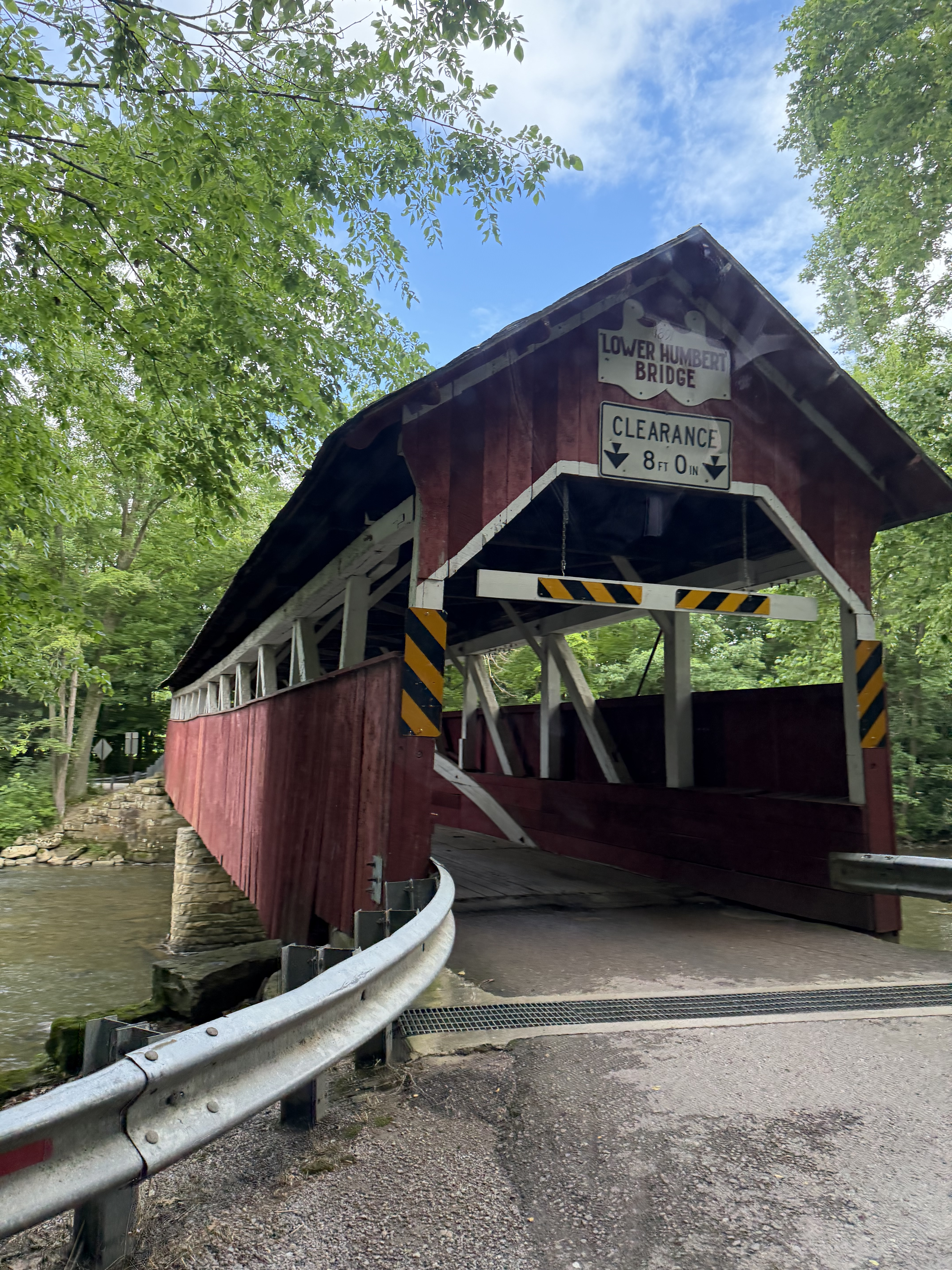
Back view of bridge and signs in front, June 2026

== See also ==
- List of covered bridges on the National Register of Historic Places in Pennsylvania
- National Register of Historic Places listings in Somerset County, Pennsylvania
