= King's Bridge (Pennsylvania) =

- U.S. National Register of Historic Places
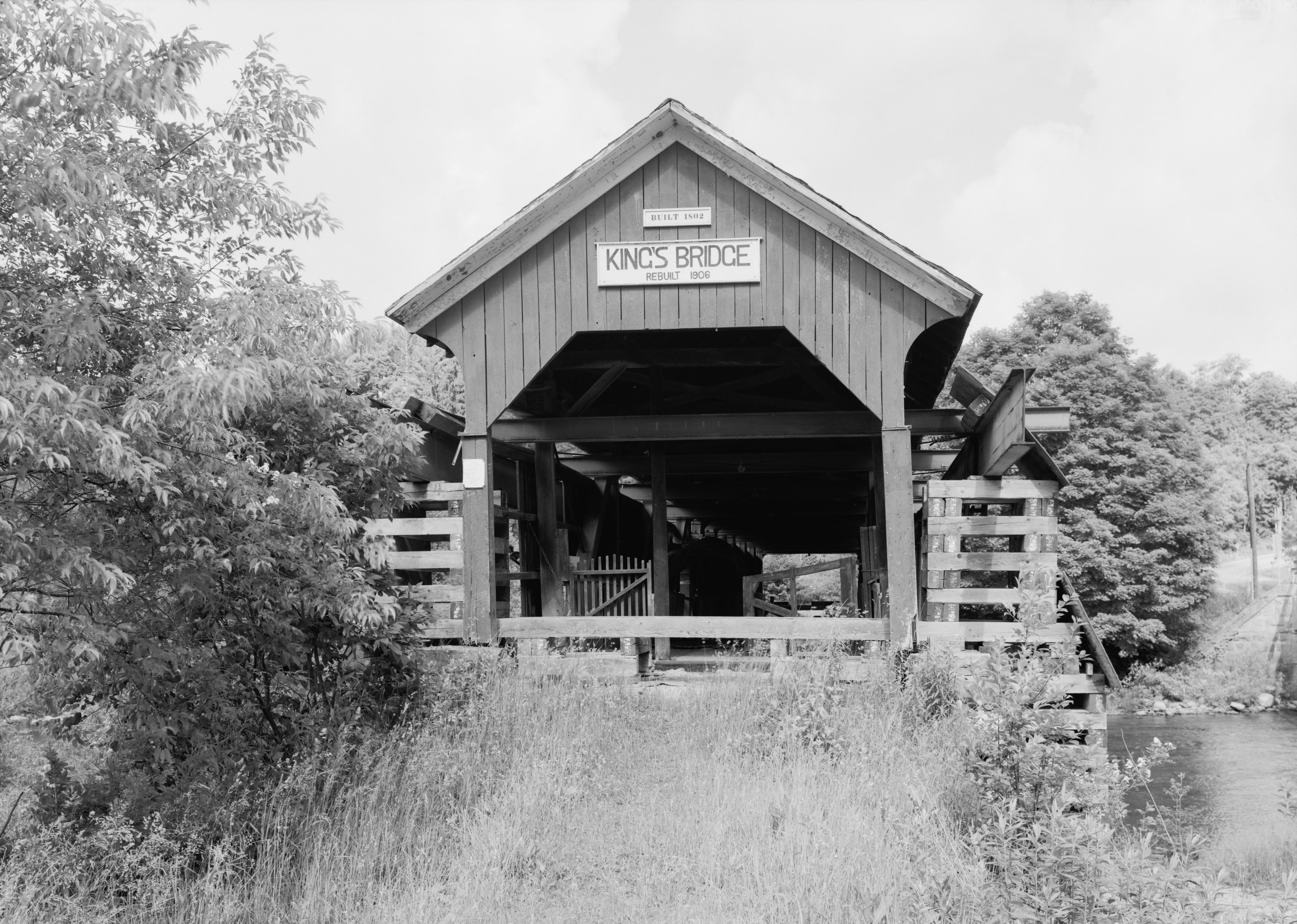
- King's Bridge, June 2005

- Location within Pennsylvania Location within the United States
- Location: West of Somerset off Pennsylvania Route 653, Middlecreek Township, Pennsylvania
- Coordinates: 39°56′15″N 79°16′17″W
- Area: 0.1 acres (0.040 ha)
- Built: 1806
- Architectural style: Kingpost truss
- MPS: Covered Bridges of Somerset County TR
- NRHP reference No.: 80003632
- Added to NRHP: December 11, 1980

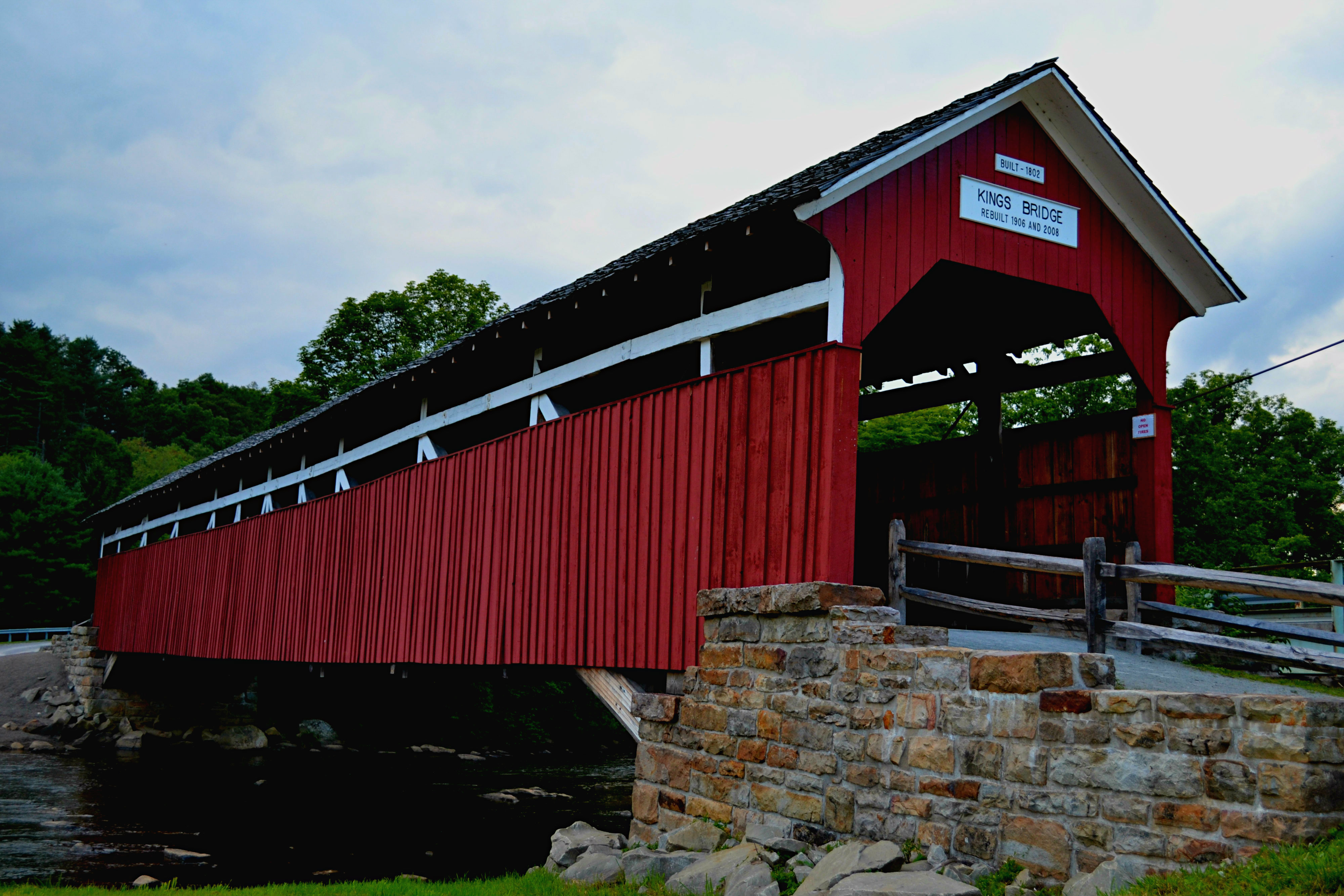
Bridge off Pennsylvania Route 653

The King's Bridge is a historic covered bridge in Middlecreek Township, Somerset County, Pennsylvania. It was built in 1802, and is a 127-foot-4-inch-long (38.81 m) Burr truss bridge, with an asbestos covered gable roof. The bridge crosses Laurel Hill Creek. It is one of 10 covered bridges in Somerset County.

It was added to the National Register of Historic Places in 1980.

== See also ==
- List of bridges documented by the Historic American Engineering Record in Pennsylvania
