= Jefferson Township, Somerset County, Pennsylvania =

Township in Pennsylvania, US

Coordinates: 40°03′00″N 79°15′59″W

- Township
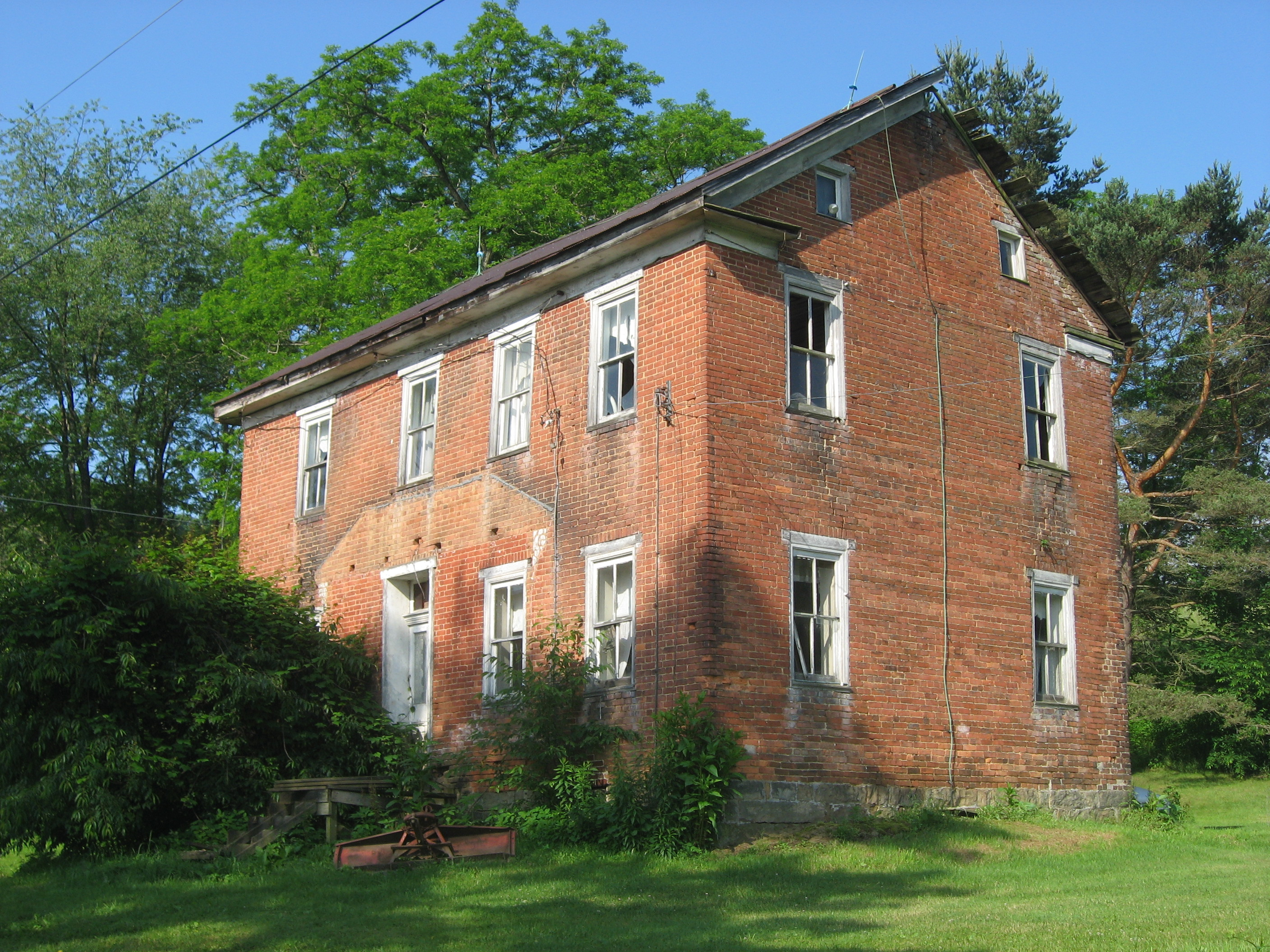
- The abandoned William P. Hay House on Jimtown Road

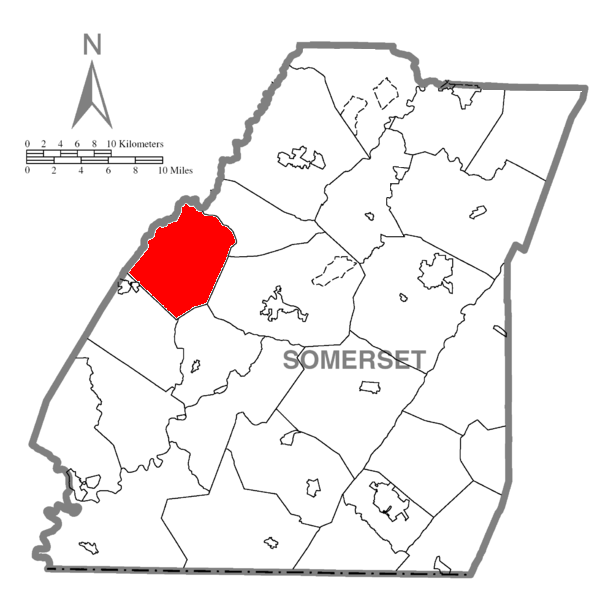
- Map of Somerset County, Pennsylvania Highlighting Jefferson Township

- Map of Somerset County, Pennsylvania
- Country: United States
- State: Pennsylvania
- County: Somerset
- Settled: about 1777
- Organized: 1847

Area
  - Total: 41.37 sq mi (107.14 km^{2})
  - Land: 41.22 sq mi (106.75 km^{2})
  - Water: 0.15 sq mi (0.39 km^{2})

Population (2020)
  - Total: 1,428 ▲
  - Estimate (2021): 1,417
  - Density: 33.2/sq mi (12.81/km^{2})
- Time zone: UTC-5 (Eastern (EST))
  - Summer (DST): UTC-4 (EDT)
- FIPS code: 42-111-37920

Jefferson Township is a township in Somerset County, Pennsylvania, United States. The population was 1,428 at the 2020 census. It is part of the Johnstown, Pennsylvania, Metropolitan Statistical Area.

== History ==
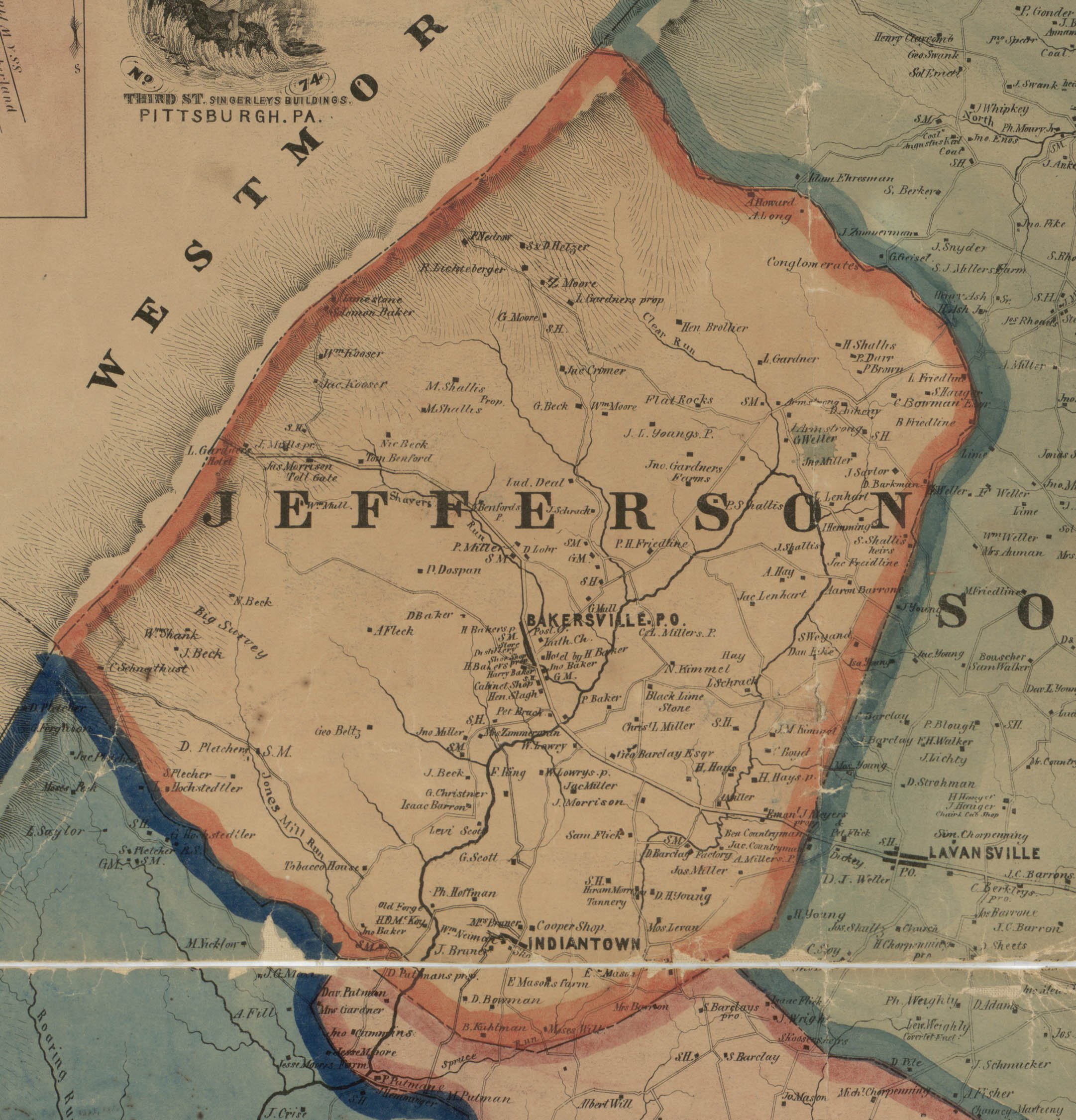
Jefferson Township, Somerset County, Pennsylvania, 1860

Jefferson Township was organized in 1847 from a portion of Somerset Township and named for Thomas Jefferson.

Conrad Shaulis, one of the early settlers, served in the American Revolution. By 1783, 24 families farmed in the area; the earliest had arrived about six years earlier. Other early settlers included James Allen, Adam Flick, John Mason, and Nicholas Barron. A Lutheran church was built in 1849, and a German Baptist church in 1873.

The Kooser State Park Family Cabin District was added to the National Register of Historic Places in 1987.

== Geography ==
According to the United States Census Bureau, the township has a total area of 41.5 square miles (107 km^{2}), of which 41.3 square miles (107 km^{2}) is land and 0.2 square miles (0.52 km^{2}) (0.41%) is water. Jefferson Township is bordered by Lincoln Township to the northeast, Somerset Township to the east, Milford Township to the southeast, Middlecreek Township to the southwest, and Westmoreland County to the northwest.

Laurel Hill Creek begins in Jefferson Township, with additional tributaries such as Crab Run, Clear Run, Shanks Run, Shafer Run, Moore Run, Kooser Run, Gross Run, Crise Run, Buck Run, and Jones Mill Run joining its stream before it enters Middlecreek Township. Forbes State Forest, Laurel Hill State Park, and Kooser State Park are located in Jefferson Township. Camp Conestoga & Camp Buck Run of the Westmoreland-Fayette Council of the Boy Scouts of America are also located in the township.

== Demographics ==
Historical population
Census	Pop.	Note	%±
2010	1,423		—
2020	1,428		0.4%
2021 (est.)	1,417		−0.8%
U.S. Decennial Census

As of the census of 2000, there were 1,375 people, 532 households, and 394 families living in the township. The population density was 33.3 inhabitants per square mile (12.9/km^{2}). There were 1,223 housing units at an average density of 29.6 per square mile (11.4/km^{2}). The racial makeup of the township was 99.27% White, 0.36% African American, 0.07% Native American, 0.07% Asian, and 0.22% from two or more races. Hispanic or Latino of any race were 0.36% of the population.

There were 532 households, out of which 32.7% had children under the age of 18 living with them, 64.8% were married couples living together, 5.3% had a female householder with no husband present, and 25.8% were non-families. 22.4% of all households were made up of individuals, and 8.1% had someone living alone who was 65 years of age or older. The average household size was 2.55 and the average family size was 2.97.

In the township the population was spread out, with 23.8% under the age of 18, 5.8% from 18 to 24, 28.3% from 25 to 44, 28.1% from 45 to 64, and 14.0% who were 65 years of age or older. The median age was 41 years. For every 100 females, there were 113.8 males. For every 100 females age 18 and over, there were 109.2 males.

The median income for a household in the township was $37,917, and the median income for a family was $40,388. Males had a median income of $30,395 versus $19,167 for females. The per capita income for the township was $16,880. About 8.6% of families and 10.6% of the population were below the poverty line, including 8.5% of those under age 18 and 13.0% of those age 65 or over.
