= Laurel Hill Creek =

Stream in Pennsylvania, USA

Laurel Hill Creek Tributary to Casselman River
- Location of Laurel Hill Creek mouth

Location
- Country: United States
- State: Pennsylvania
- County: Somerset

Physical characteristics
- Source: divide between Laurel Hill Creek and Casselman River
  - location: about 0.5 miles east of Indiantown, Pennsylvania
  - coordinates: 40°00′13″N 079°12′16″W
  - elevation: 2,200 ft (670 m)
- Mouth: Casselman River
  - location: Confluence, Pennsylvania
  - coordinates: 39°48′53″N 079°21′42″W
  - elevation: 1,330 ft (410 m)
- Length: 39.9 mi (64.2 km)
- Basin size: 125.09 square miles (324.0 km^{2})
- Discharge
  - location: Casselman River
  - average: 283.58 cu ft/s (8.030 m^{3}/s) at mouth with Casselman River

Basin features
- Progression: southwest
- River system: Youghiogheny River
- Tributaries
  - left: Lost Creek; Mose King Run; May Run; Smith Hollow; Paddytown Hollow
  - right: Crab Run; Clear Run; Shanks Run; Shafer Run; Gross Run; Crise Run; Jones Mill Run; Crab Run; Allen Creek; Fall Creek; Whipkey Run; Glade Run
- Waterbodies: Laurel Hill Lake

Laurel Hill Creek is a 39.9-mile-long (64.2 km) tributary of the Casselman River that is located in Somerset County, Pennsylvania, in the United States. It is part of the Youghiogheny River watershed, flowing to the Monongahela River, the Ohio River, and ultimately the Mississippi River.

It is responsible for draining 126 square miles of the 576 square miles drained by the Casselman River.

== Geography ==
Laurel Hill Creek drains the east slope of Laurel Hill in the Laurel Highlands and flows to the appropriately named community of Confluence, where it joins the Casselman River a few yards above the Youghiogheny. It begins in Jefferson Township, with tributaries such as Crab Run, Clear Run, Shanks Run, Shafer Run, Moore Run, Kooser Run, Gross Run, Crise Run, Buck Run, and Jones Mill Run joining its stream, and then flows through Middlecreek Township, with tributaries such as Allen Creek, Garys Run, Blue Hole Creek, Cole Run, Showman Run, Fall Creek, and Lost Creek joining it.

The creek continues through Upper Turkeyfoot Township, with tributaries such as Green King Run / Whipkey Run, Mud Lick Run / Mose King Run, and Sandy Run adding to its flow. Laurel Hill Creek finally passes through Lower Turkeyfoot Township, with tributaries such as Cranberry Glade Run, May Run, and Licking Run joining it before it enters the Casselman River in Confluence, just before the Casselman River flows into the Youghiogheny River.

Laurel Hill Creek was listed at #7 on American Rivers' "Most Endangered Rivers" list for 2009.

== Bridges ==
Barronvale Bridge, King's Bridge and Lower Humbert Covered Bridge cross Laurel Hill Creek.

== See also ==
- List of rivers of Pennsylvania
