= Miller's Store =

- U.S. National Register of Historic Places
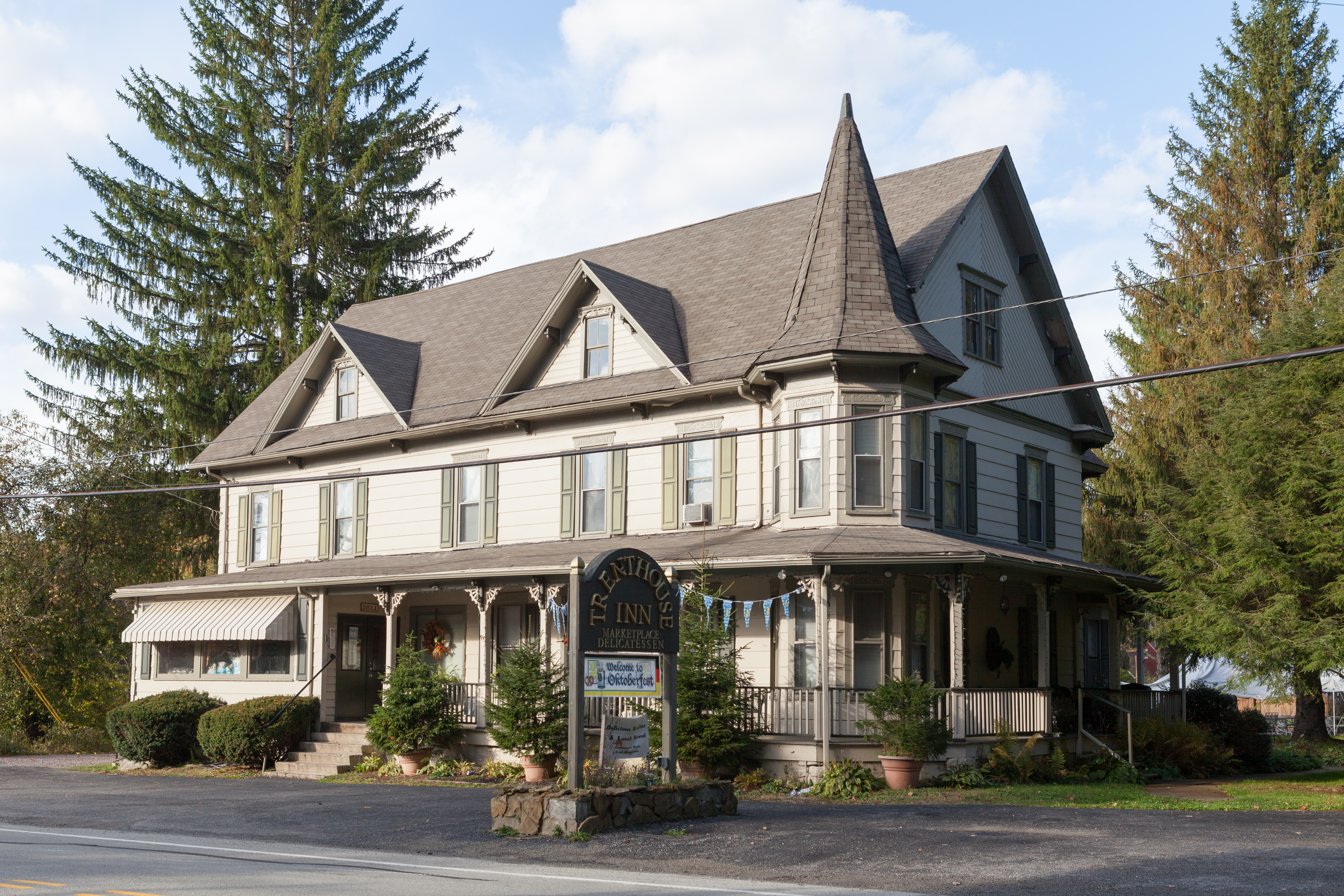
- October 2014

- Location within Pennsylvania Location within the United States
- Location: Jct. of PA 3029 and PA 3033, Middlecreek Township, Pennsylvania
- Coordinates: 39°59′11″N 79°14′28″W
- Area: 1.8 acres (0.73 ha)
- Built: 1884, 1895
- Built by: Newton Mognet, W.H. Mognet, C.N. Mognet
- Architectural style: Queen Anne
- NRHP reference No.: 92000948
- Added to NRHP: July 24, 1992

Miller's Store, also known as the Trent House and General Store and the Trenthouse Inn and Country Store, is an historic commercial building that is located in Trent in Middlecreek Township, Somerset County, Pennsylvania, United States.

It was added to the National Register of Historic Places in 1992.

== History and architectural features ==
Built in 1885, this historic structure was expanded circa 1895. It is a large, two-and-one-half-story, U-shaped, Queen Anne-style building that was designed to house a general store, post office, and hotel. The corner of the front facade features a two-story, hexagonal tower with a faceted conical roof and copper finial. This structure also has a wraparound porch.
