= Barronvale Bridge =

Covered bridge in Pennsylvania

- U.S. National Register of Historic Places
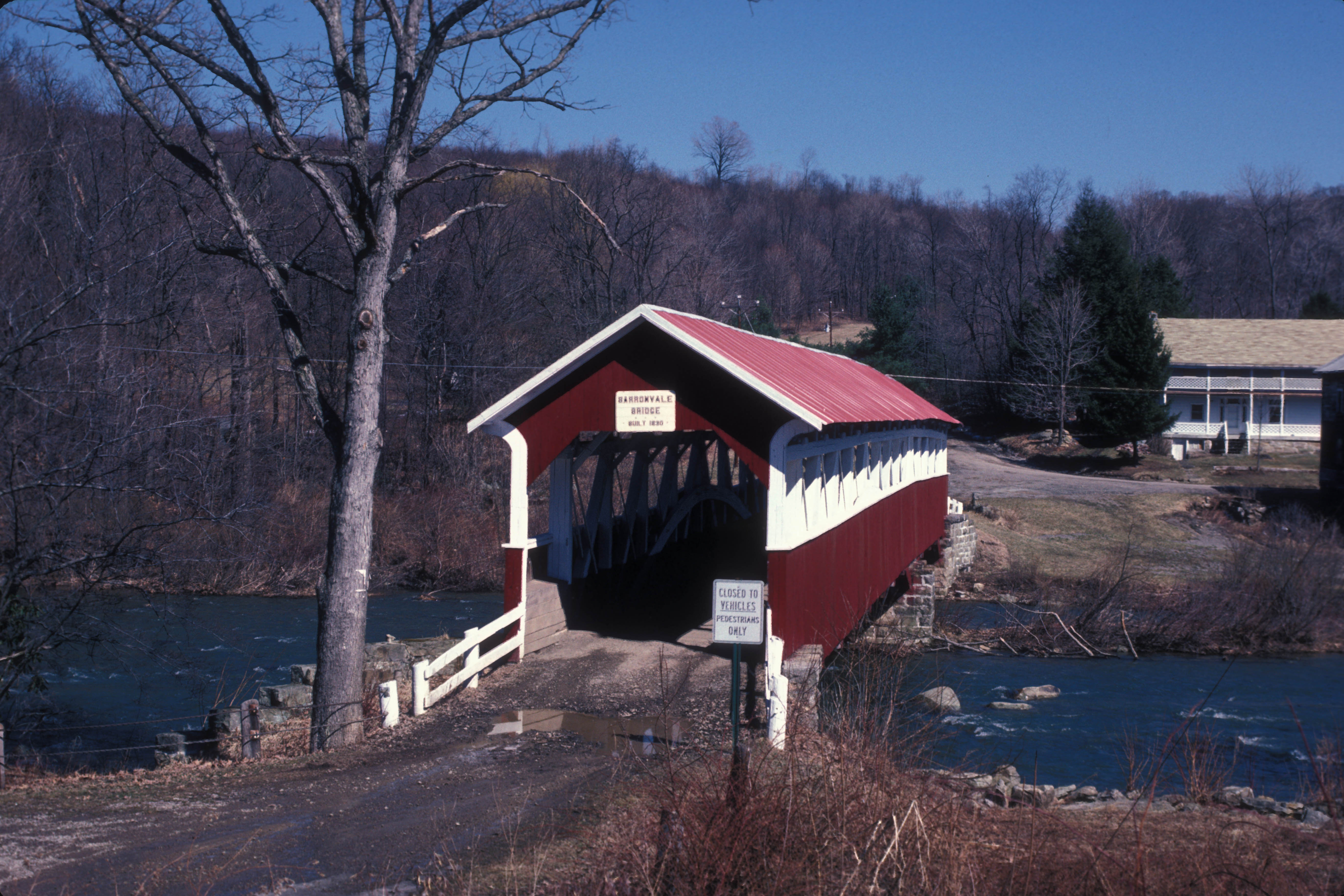

- Location within Pennsylvania Location within the United States
- Location: West of Somerset off Legislative Route 55118, Middlecreek Township, Pennsylvania
- Coordinates: 39°57′10″N 79°16′14″W
- Area: 0.1 acres (0.040 ha)
- Built: 1902
- Built by: Cassimer Cramer
- Architectural style: Burr arch
- MPS: Covered Bridges of Somerset County TR
- NRHP reference No.: 80003633
- Added to NRHP: December 11, 1980

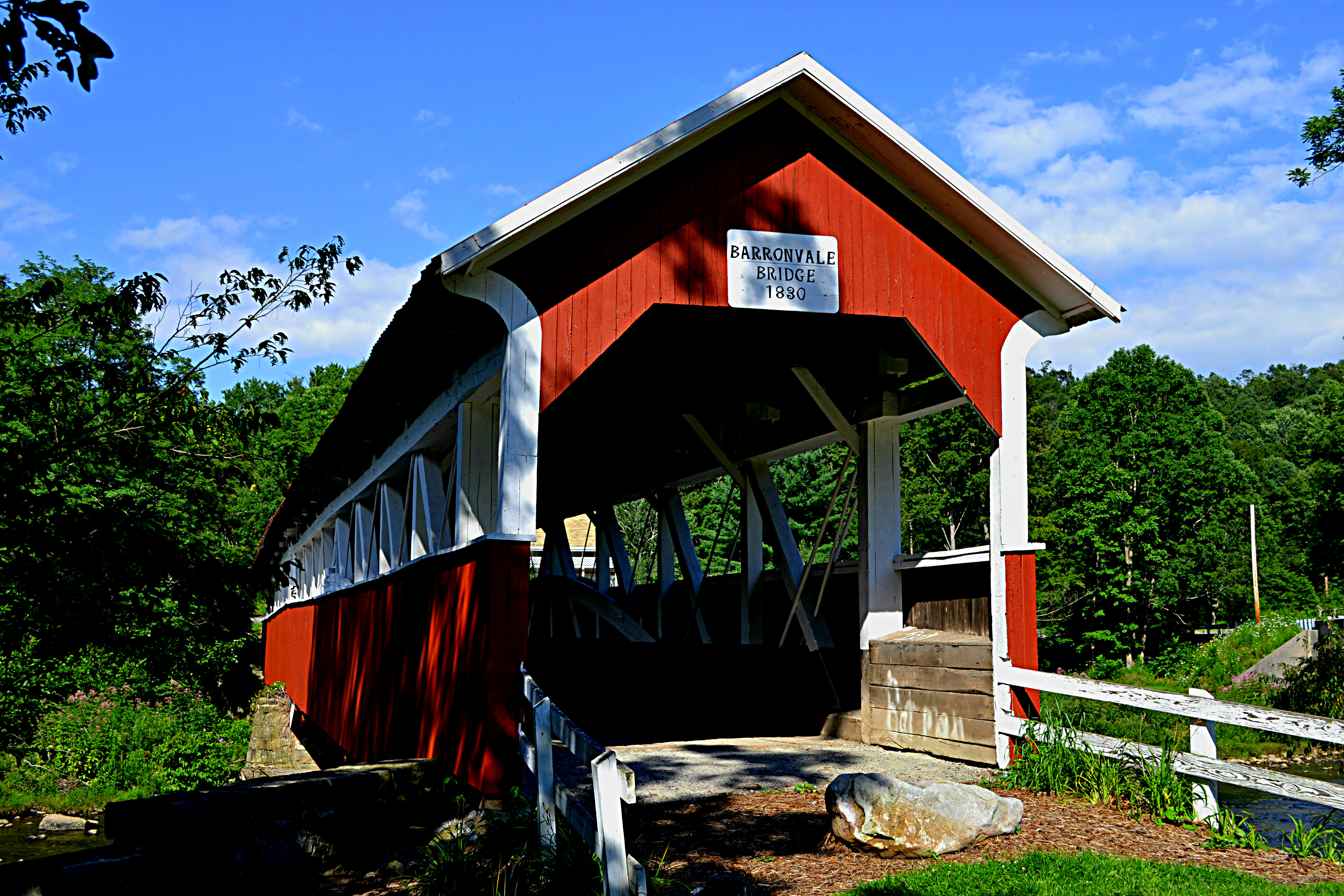
Barronvale Bridge

The Barronvale Bridge, also known as Barron's Mill Bridge, is a historic covered bridge at Middlecreek Township, in Somerset County, Pennsylvania crossing Laurel Hill Creek. At 162 feet 3 inches (49.45 m) it is the longest remaining covered bridge in Somerset County. It is 13 feet 10 inches (4.22 m) wide. The Burr truss bridge was built in 1902, and is one of 10 covered bridges in Somerset County.
