= Laurel Hill State Park =

State park in Pennsylvania, United States

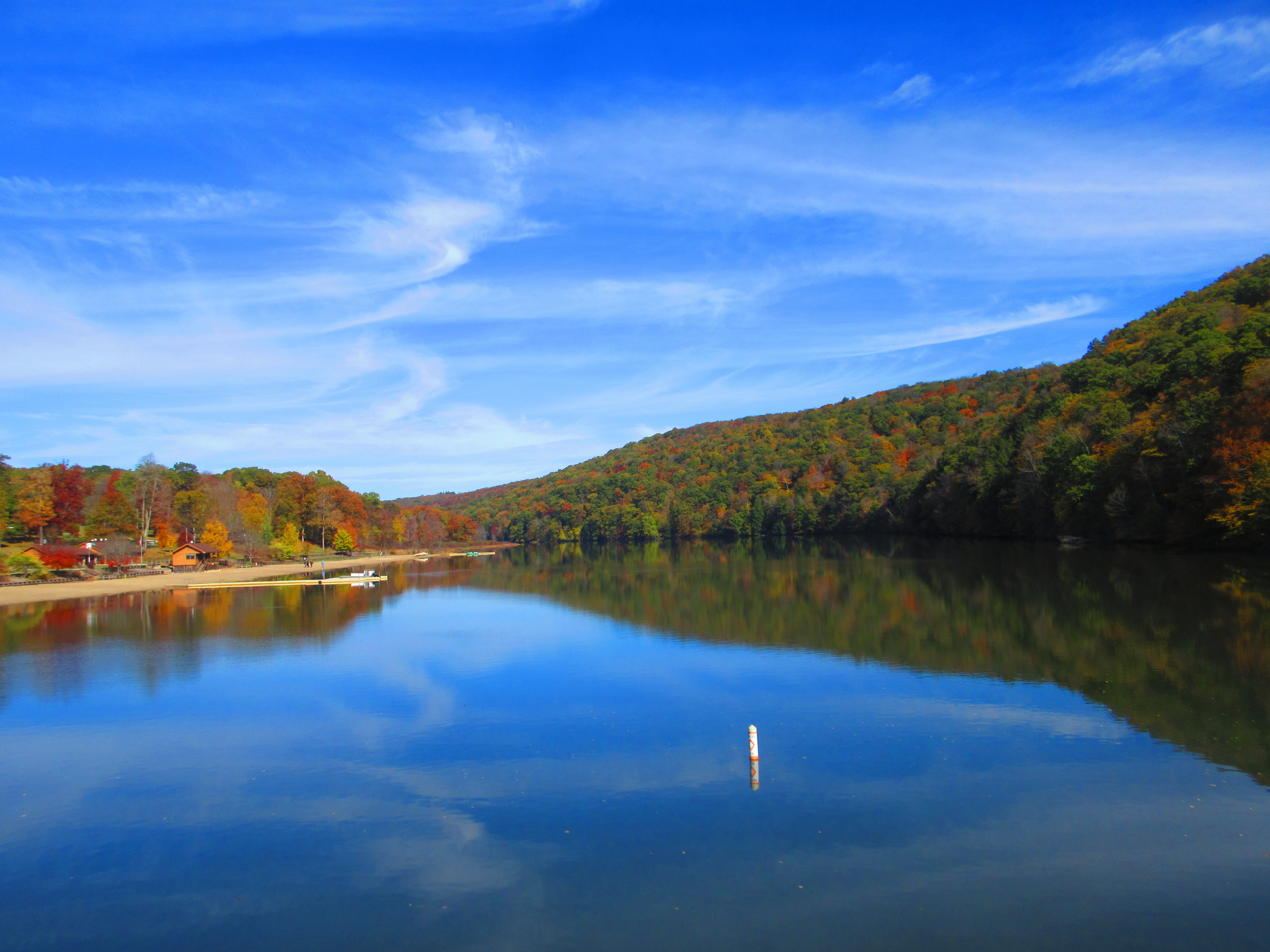

- Location within Pennsylvania Location within the United States
- Interactive map of Laurel Hill State Park
- Location: Somerset County, Pennsylvania, United States
- Coordinates: 40°00′37″N 79°13′28″W
- Area: 4,062 acres (1,644 ha)
- Elevation: 2,316 feet (706 m)
- Established: 1945
- Administrator: Pennsylvania Department of Conservation and Natural Resources
- Website: Official website
- Pennsylvania State Parks
- Laurel Hill RDA
- U.S. National Register of Historic Places
- U.S. Historic district
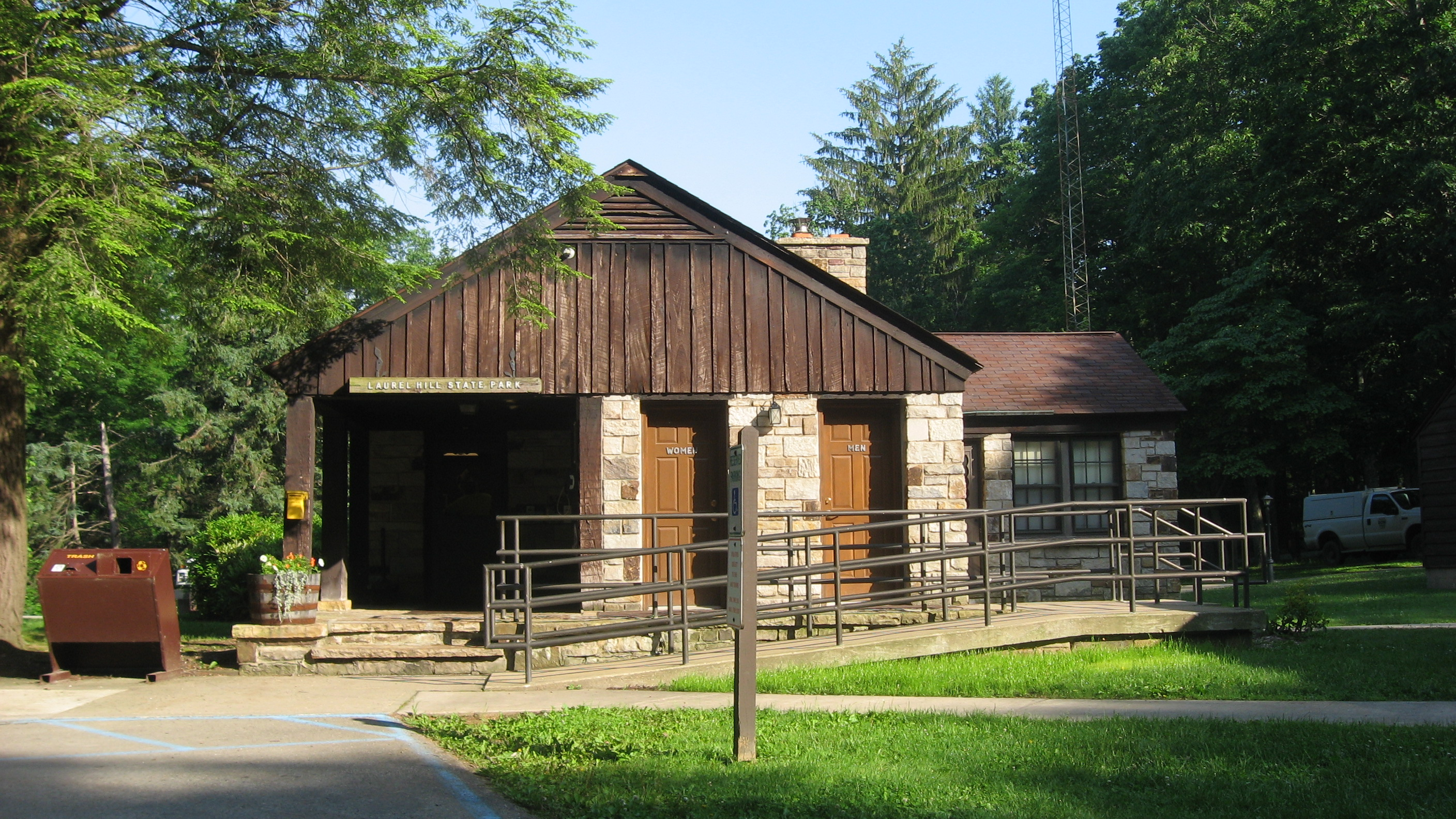
- Park offices
- Location: 4 mi. W of New Centerville and PA 281, Somerset, Pennsylvania
- Area: 1,352 acres (547 ha)
- Built: 1935-1942
- Built by: Civilian Conservation Corps, Camps NP-5-PA and SP-15-PA
- Architectural style: Rustic style
- MPS: Emergency Conservation Work (ECW) Architecture in Pennsylvania State Parks: 1933-1942, TR
- NRHP reference No.: 87000738
- Added to NRHP: May 18, 1987

Laurel Hill State Park is a 4,062-acre (1,644 ha) Pennsylvania state park in Jefferson and Middlecreek townships, Somerset County, Pennsylvania in the United States. Laurel Hill Lake is a 63-acre (25 ha) man-made lake with a dam that was constructed during the Great Depression by the young men of CCC camps NP-5-PA (first called SP-8-PA) and SP-15-PA. Laurel Hill State Park is 8 miles (13 km) from the Pennsylvania Turnpike (I-70/I-76) just off PA 31 near Bakersville and on PA 653 near Trent.

== History ==
=== The lumber era ===
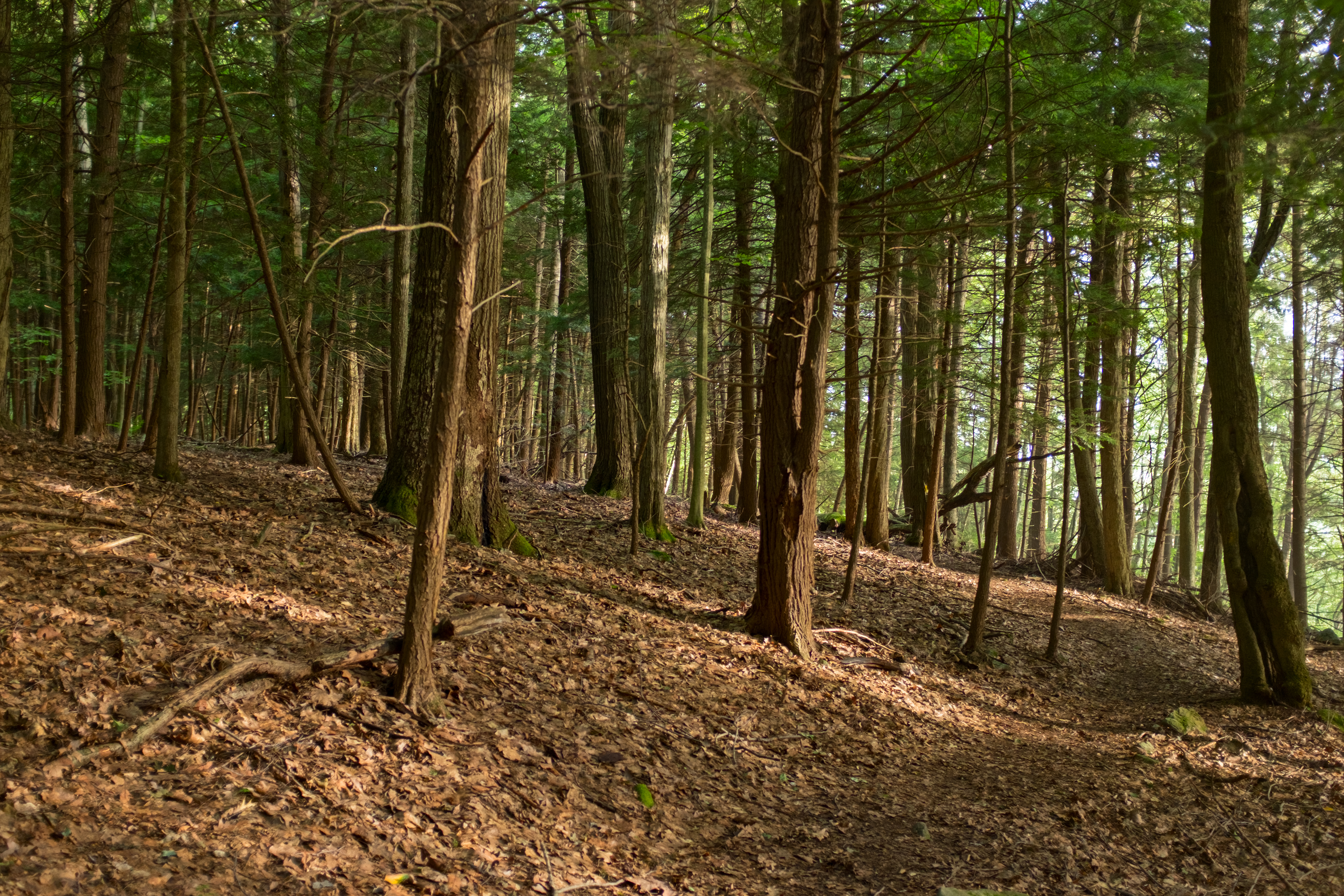
Second growth trees on the Hemlock trail

The lumber boom that swept through the forests of Pennsylvania did not reach the Laurel Hill Valley until 1886. Due to its steep stream valleys and terrain, the area was among the last in Pennsylvania to be clearcut. Logs were hauled by steam locomotives to sawmills where they were cut into lumber. Smaller logs were used to reinforce the mine shafts of the many coal mines throughout southwestern Pennsylvania and West Virginia. The bark of the hemlock tree was used as a source of tannin at the tanneries of the area. Logging companies left behind a wasteland of dried treetops and brambles, which would ignite from passing locomotives and cause forest fires. From 1886 to 1940, most of Laurel Hill was stripped of its old-growth forests. One stand of old growth trees, now called the Hemlock Trail Natural Area, remains at Laurel Hill State Park.

=== Restoration and conservation ===
Beginning in 1935, the Federal Emergency Relief Administration began purchasing poor quality land with recreational potential as part of the Recreational Demonstration Area (RDA) program. The RDA program was transferred to the National Park Service in 1936. Laurel Hill was one of five RDAs in Pennsylvania targeted for restoration, reforestation, and recreational use. Laurel Hill was designated a "vacation area" designed to provide low cost outdoor experiences for families and groups.

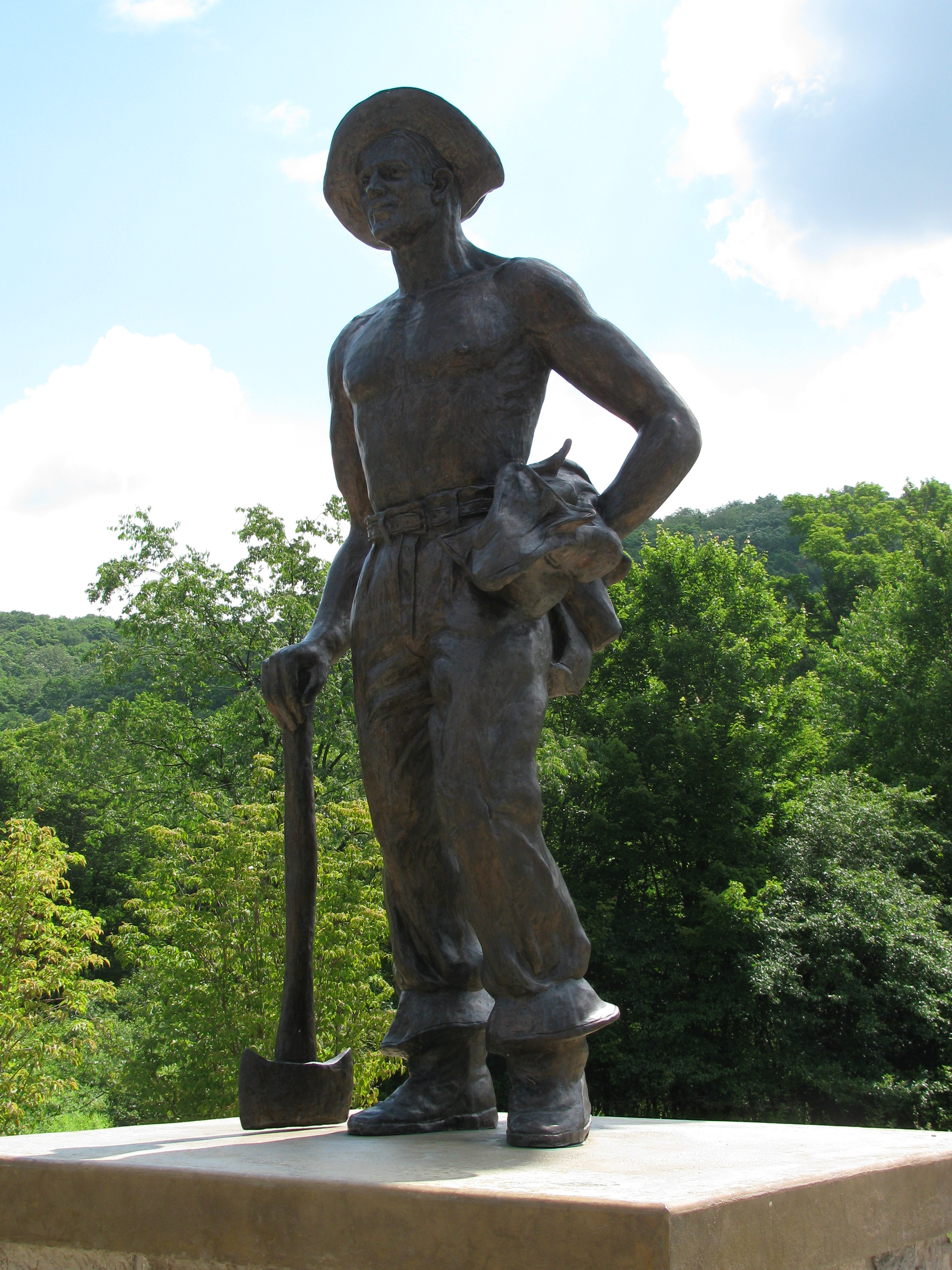
Monument to Civilian Conservation Corps worker at Laurel Hill State Park

The National Park Service, in cooperation with the Pennsylvania Department of Forests and Waters (today the Pennsylvania Department of Conservation and Natural Resources), employed men of the Works Progress Administration and Civilian Conservation Corps (CCC) to work at Laurel Hill. Men from the first CCC camps arrived on July 1, 1935, and began building their own housing. These camps were NP-5-PA (first called SP-8-PA) and SP-15-PA. Each camp consisted of 200 men who worked year round. They cleared brush from streams, planted trees, and built roads, trails, bridges, and recreational facilities including large group camping facilities, cabins, and picnic areas. They constructed the dam to create Laurel Hill Lake.

In October 1945, the United States Department of the Interior transferred ownership of the area to the Commonwealth of Pennsylvania and Laurel Hill State Park officially opened. The park now has a thriving second growth forest that is home to a variety of wildlife.

The Laurel Hill RDA was listed on the National Register of Historic Places in 1987, as a national historic district. The district includes 198 contributing buildings and 4 contributing structures. It is the largest collection of CCC architecture in Pennsylvania's state parks. The park received a Pennsylvania State Historical Marker in 2021.

== Recreation ==
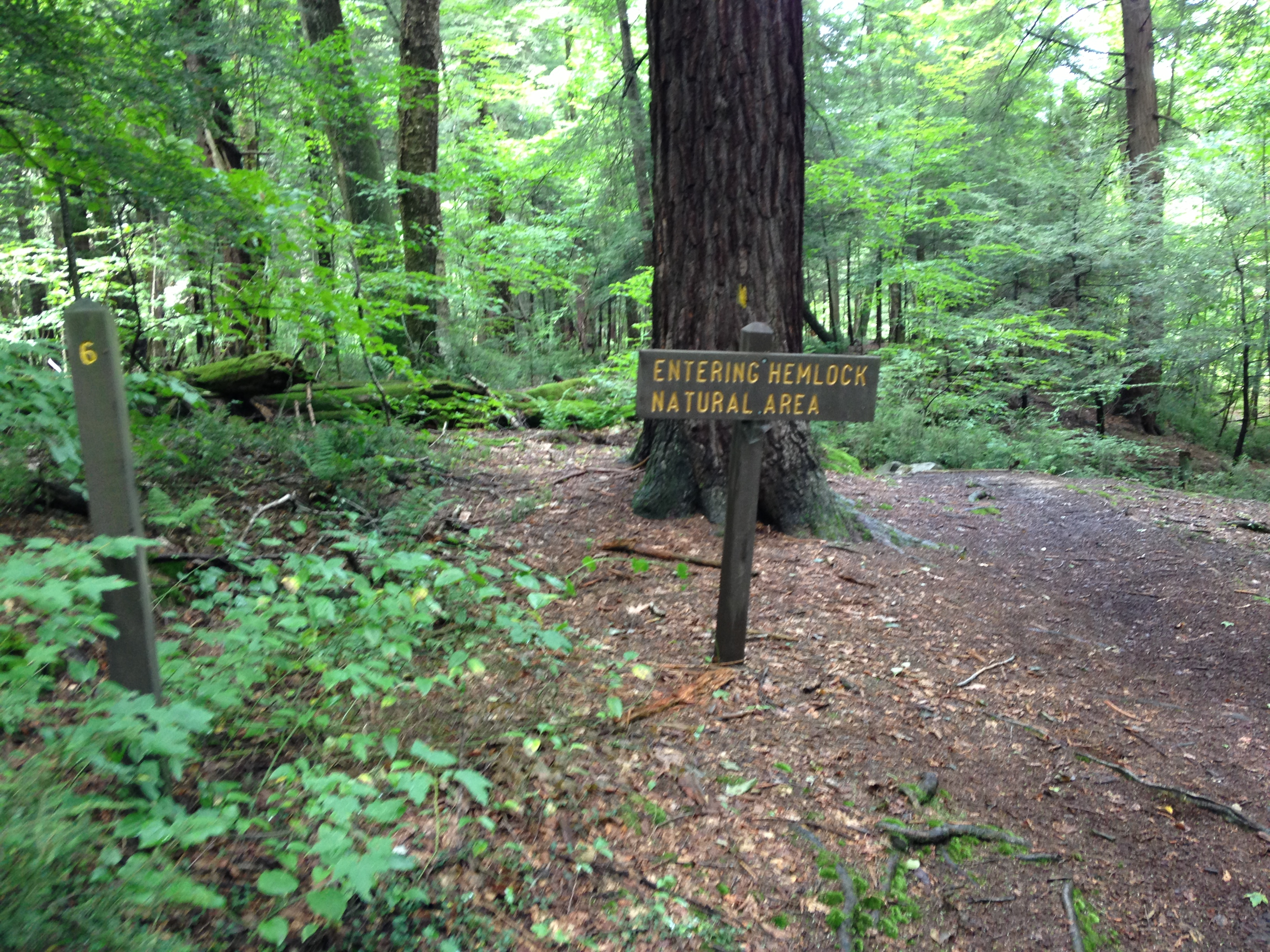
Entry to the virgin forest at Laurel Hill

=== Trails ===
Laurel Hill State Park maintains 15 miles of trails with varying levels of hiking difficulty.

- Hemlock Trail is a 1.2 mile (1.9 km) trail that loops through the six-acre Hemlock Trail Natural Area, which contains a stand of old growth eastern hemlock trees. When Laurel Hill was logged, the only virgin trees left untouched were on steep ground above the Laurel Hill Creek that was apparently too difficult for the loggers to reach. The Hemlock Trail is accessible from one end at the sharp bend on Buck Run Road, and from the other at the head of the lake.
- Beltz Trail is a 2.75 mile (4.4 km) trail that follows an old road grade and provides access to trails throughout the park and Forbes State Forest.
- Bobcat Trail is a 1-mile (1.6 km) rugged hiking trail with opportunities to view wildlife and mountain laurel.
- Copper Kettle Trail is a 1.25 mile (2 km), ADA accessible bike path along the western shoreline of Laurel Hill Lake that provides access to the beach and areas for picnicking and fishing.
- Lake Trail is a 1.75 mile (2.8 km) trail that follows steep terrain along Laurel Hill Creek and the eastern shore of Laurel Hill Lake.
- Martz Trail is a 1-mile (1.6 km) trail that passes through different forest ecosystems containing a variety of tree species.
- Pumphouse Trail is a 1.6 mile trail to the Jones Mill Run Dam, built by the CCC.
- Ridge Trail is a 1.5 mile (2.4 km) trail often used as a wildlife corridor, providing the best opportunity to spot wildlife.
- Shay Trail is a 0.5 mile (0.8 km) trail named for the Shay locomotives that were used when the land was logged in the early 1900s. It connects Ridge, Tram Road, and Pumphouse trails.
- Tram Road Trail is a 1.7 mile (2.7 km) that follows the general course of the logging railroad of the early 1900s.
- Waterline Trail is a 0.6 mile (0.96 km) uphill grade that passes by geological features including fossils.

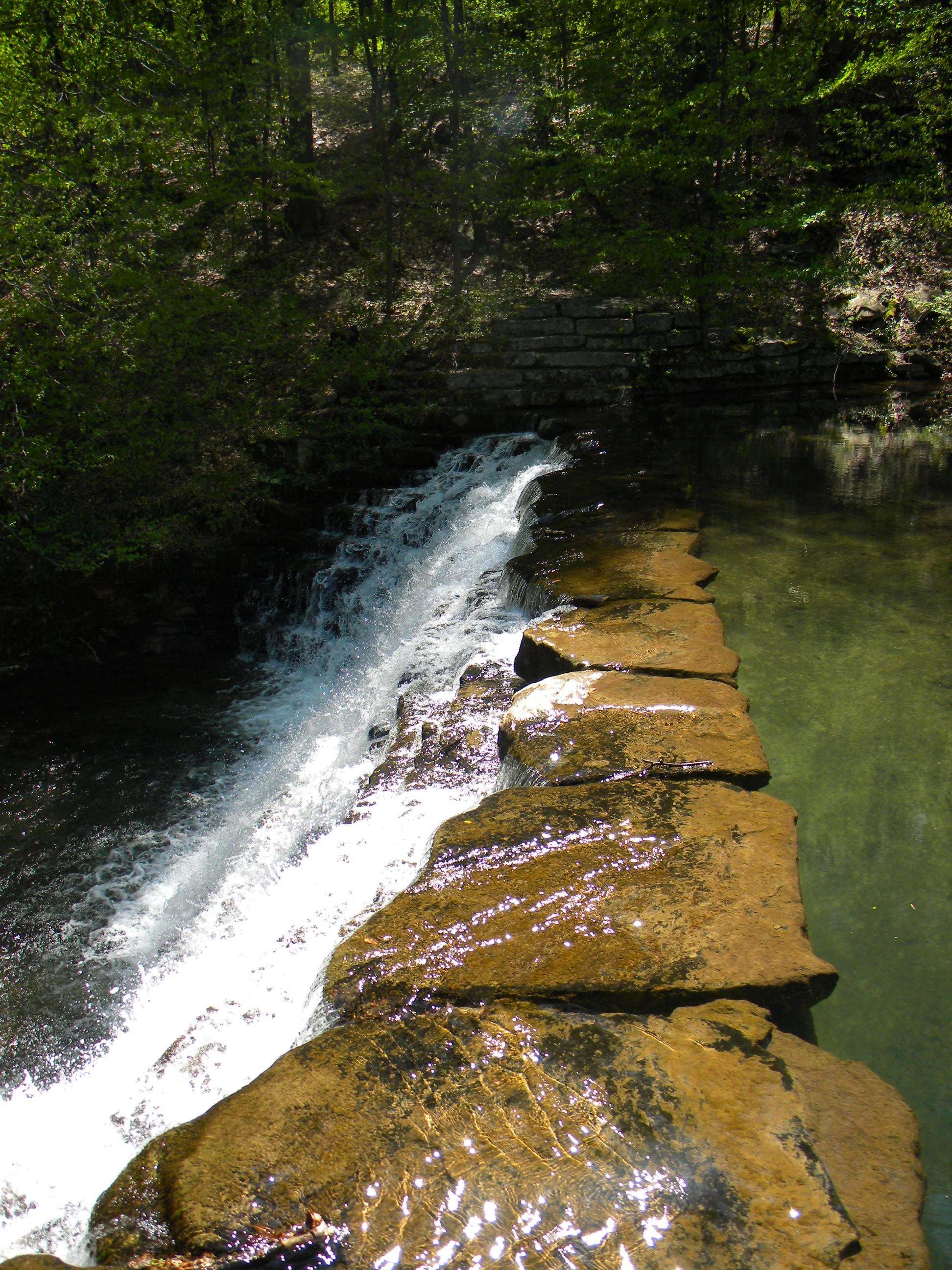
Jones Mill Run Dam. Located just off of the Pumphouse Trail

=== Hunting ===
Hunting is permitted on about 2,100 acres (850 ha) of Laurel Hill State Park. The most common game species are rabbits, pheasant, raccoon, squirrels, turkey and white-tailed deer. The hunting of groundhogs is prohibited. Hunters are expected to follow the rules and regulations of the Pennsylvania Game Commission. Each September Laurel Hill State Park is open for Canada goose hunting. The goose hunt is part of a statewide effort to limit the "resident goose" population. Biologists have attributed high fecal coliform counts at some parks to geese droppings. The fecal matter pollutes the water and beaches of the parks.

=== Fishing and boating ===
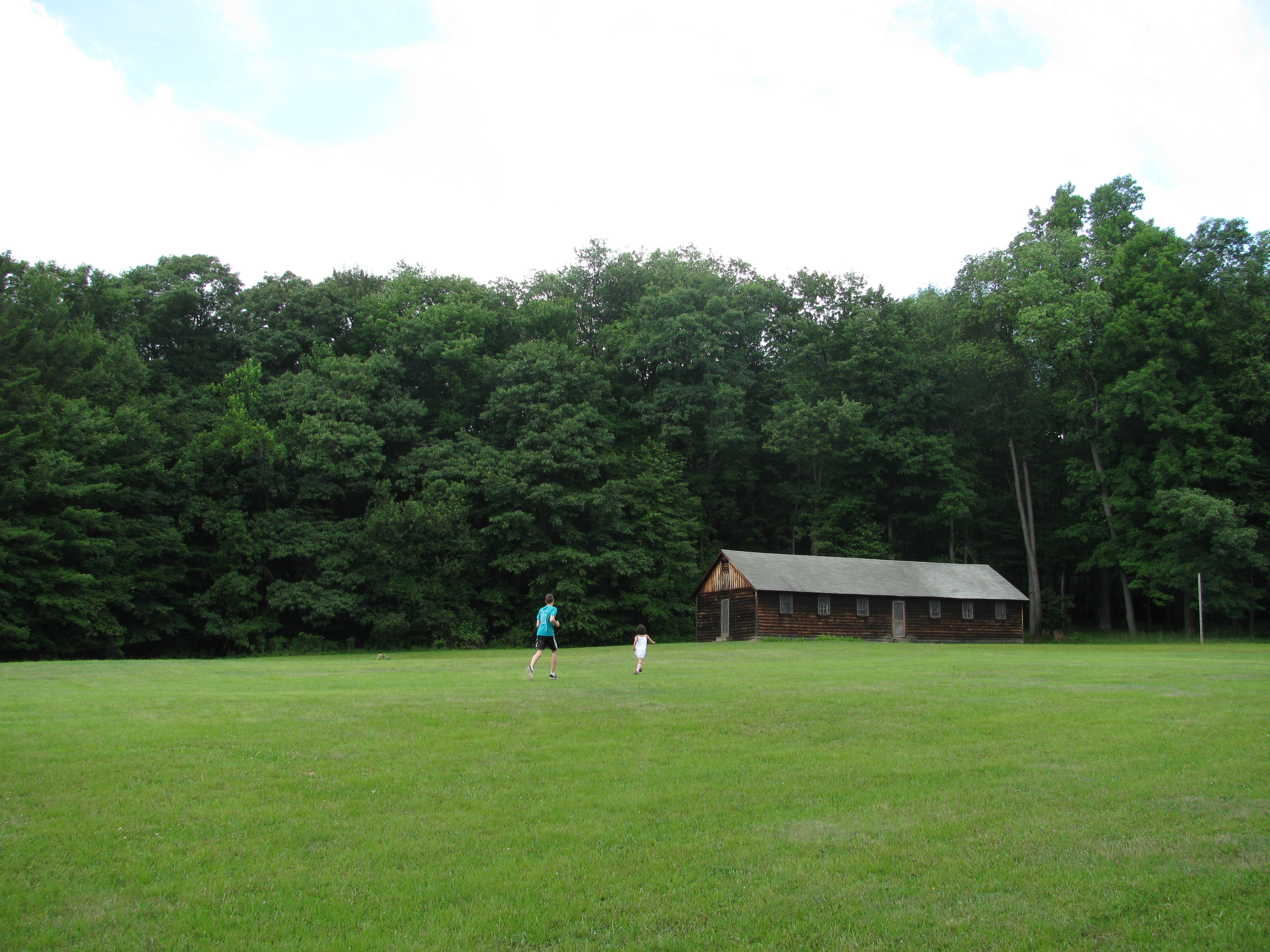
CCC-era cabins at the park

Laurel Hill Creek and Jones Mill Run are stocked with trout and also have a good population of native brook trout. Laurel Hill Lake is a fishery for trout, catfish, sunfish, perch, crappie, bluegill, and bass.

Gasoline powered boats are prohibited on Laurel Hill Lake. Non powered and electric powered boats must have current registration with any state.

=== Swimming ===
The beach at Laurel Hill State Park is open daily from late May until the middle of September. The beach opens at 8:00 am and closes at sunset.

=== Picnics ===
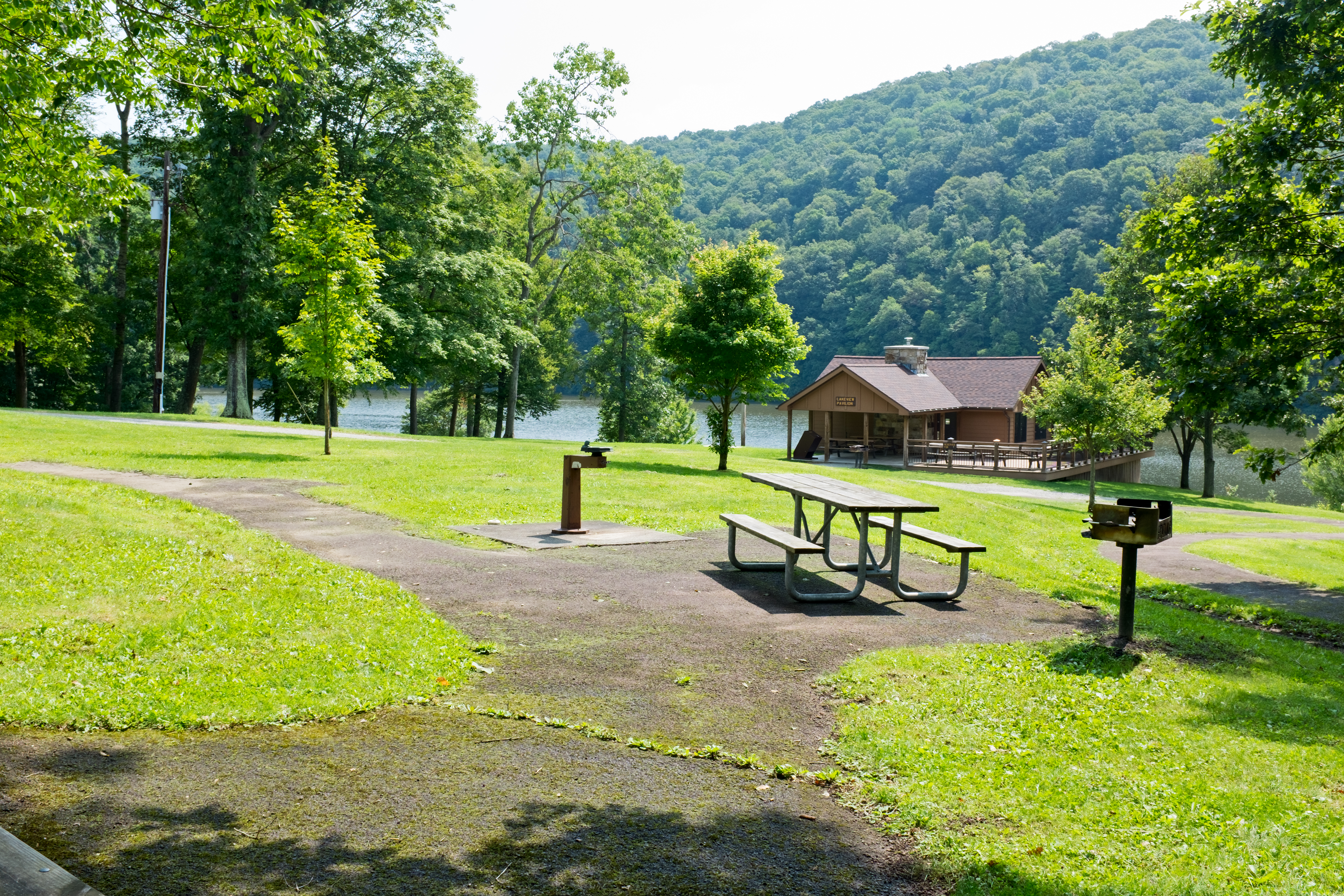
Lake, Pavilion, and Picnic area.

Laurel Hill State Park has three picnic areas. Picnic area #1 has a playground, a ballfield and horseshoe pits. Picnic area #3 is near the beach and also has a playground. Picnic area #4 is near the boat launch and mooring area. There is no picnic area #2.

=== Winter recreation ===
There is a 10 miles (16 km) snowmobile trail system in the park that leads to 60 miles (97 km) of trails in Forbes State Forest. Laurel Hill Lake is open for ice fishing and ice boating. Laurel Hill State Park has 20 miles (32 km) of trails open to cross-country skiing.

== Staying overnight ==
Laurel Hill State Park has several options for visitors that are interested in spending the night or several nights at the park.

=== Campground ===
The campground has 262 sites for tent or trailer camping. 149 of these sites have an electrical connections. The campground has modern washhouses with flush toilets, showers, drinking water, and two sanitary dump stations. There is one walled tent that is available for rent, which sleeps up to six people and has a refrigerator and bunk beds.

=== Cottages ===
There are eight cottages available to rent at Laurel Hill State Park. Each cottage has electric lights, outlets, and electric heater. They sleep up to five people and have wooden floors, glass windows and a screened-in porch. The yard areas have a picnic table and a fire ring.

=== Group tenting ===
There is a large area for organized group tenting that is open year-round. Groups are expected to follow the following rules and regulations.

1. All groups must submit a roster to the park office.
2. Fires are to be built in the designated fire areas only.
3. Standing timber must not be cut.
4. Trailers are not permitted in the group tenting area.

=== Cabins (Group camping) ===
The cabins built and used by the CCC are still used today by large, non-profit groups. The six group cabin areas are open from mid-April until mid-October. These camping facilities each have a centrally located shower house with flush toilets and large dining hall with kitchen.

=== Laurel Hill Lodge ===
Laurel Hill Lodge is a modern two-story lodge with a large fireplace and cathedral ceilings. It has a private deck that overlooks the park and Laurel Mountain. The lodge is equipped for winter recreation. It has racks for skis and snowboards and for drying gloves and boots. There are five bedrooms that can sleep up to 14 people. There are 3 bathrooms, 1.5 kitchens, a recreation room and laundry facilities.

== Boy Scout camps ==
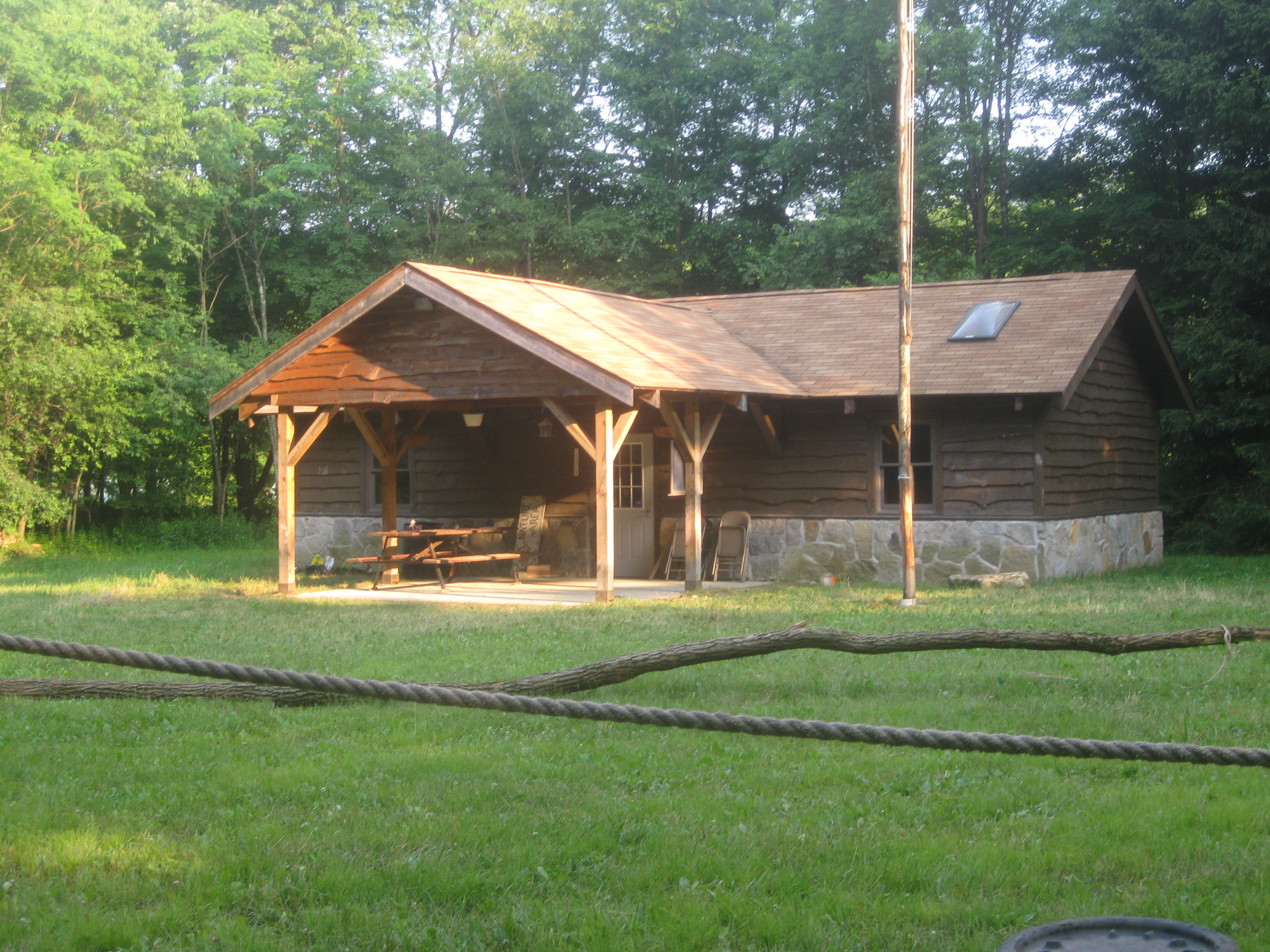
One of the buildings inside of Camp Conestoga

There are two Boy Scout camps run by Westmoreland-Fayette Council within the state park: Camp Conestoga and Camp Buck Run.
