= Middlecreek Township, Somerset County, Pennsylvania =

Township in Pennsylvania, US

Coordinates: 40°00′06″N 79°15′59″W

- Township
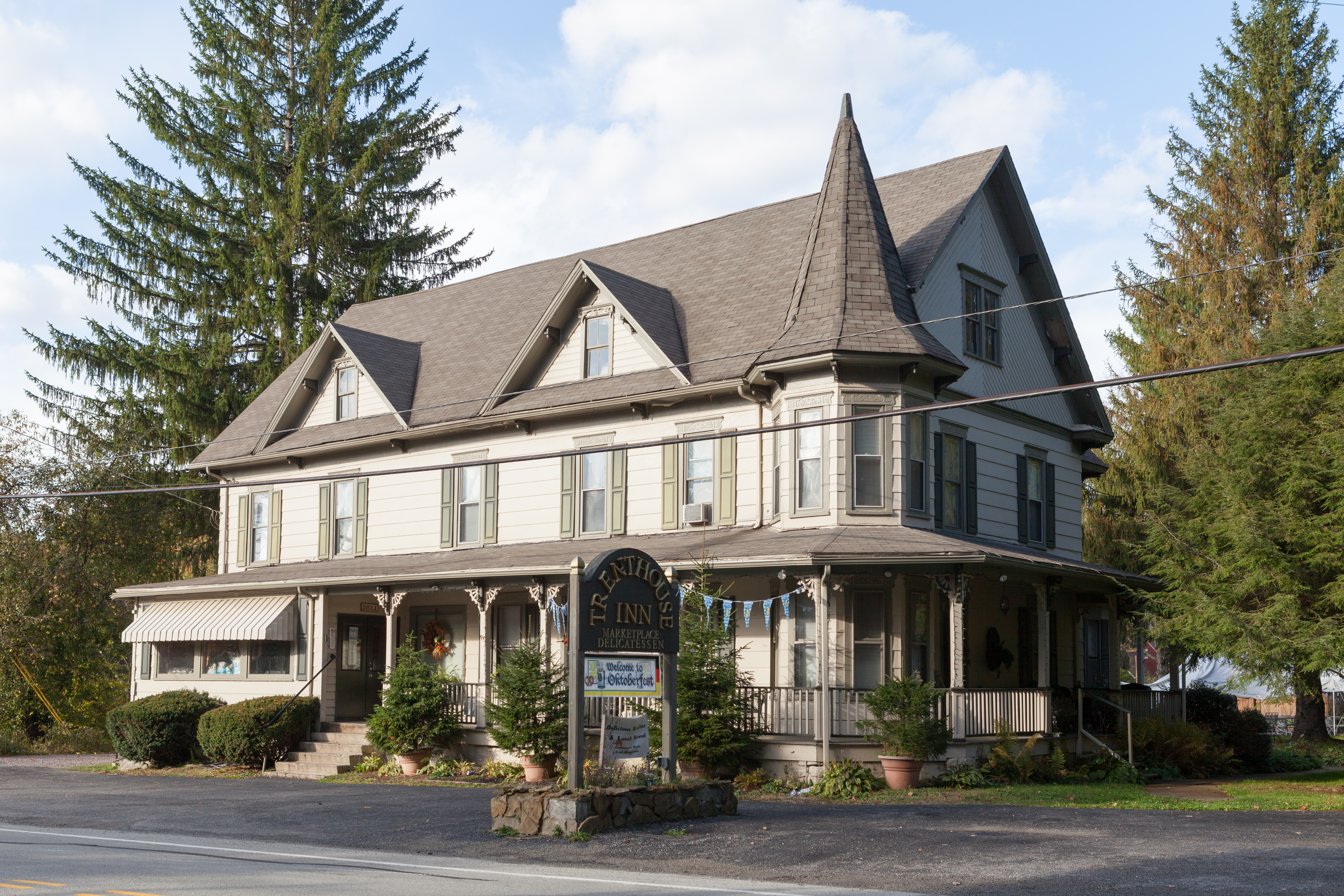
- Miller's Store at Trent

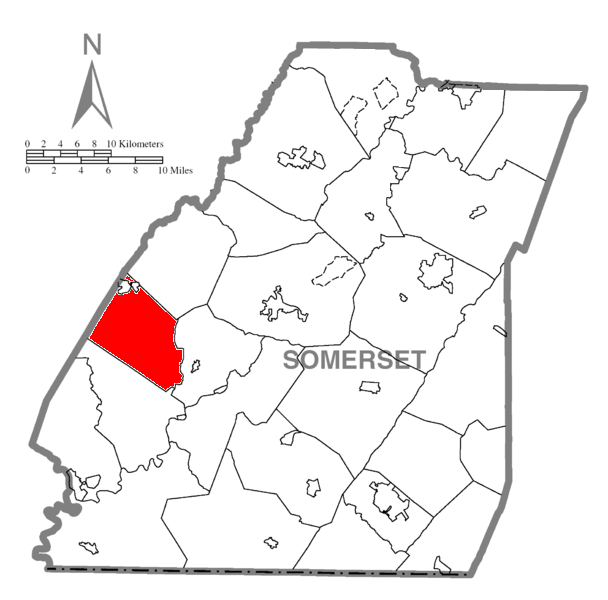
- Map of Somerset County, Pennsylvania Highlighting Middlecreek Township

- Map of Somerset County, Pennsylvania
- Country: United States
- State: Pennsylvania
- County: Somerset

Area
  - Total: 33.36 sq mi (86.39 km^{2})
  - Land: 33.27 sq mi (86.17 km^{2})
  - Water: 0.085 sq mi (0.22 km^{2})

Population (2020)
  - Total: 831 ▼
  - Estimate (2021): 823
  - Density: 25.2/sq mi (9.72/km^{2})
- Time zone: UTC-5 (Eastern (EST))
  - Summer (DST): UTC-4 (EDT)
- FIPS code: 42-111-49024

Middlecreek Township is a township in Somerset County, Pennsylvania, United States. The population was 831 at the 2020 census. It is part of the Johnstown, Pennsylvania, Metropolitan Statistical Area.

== History ==
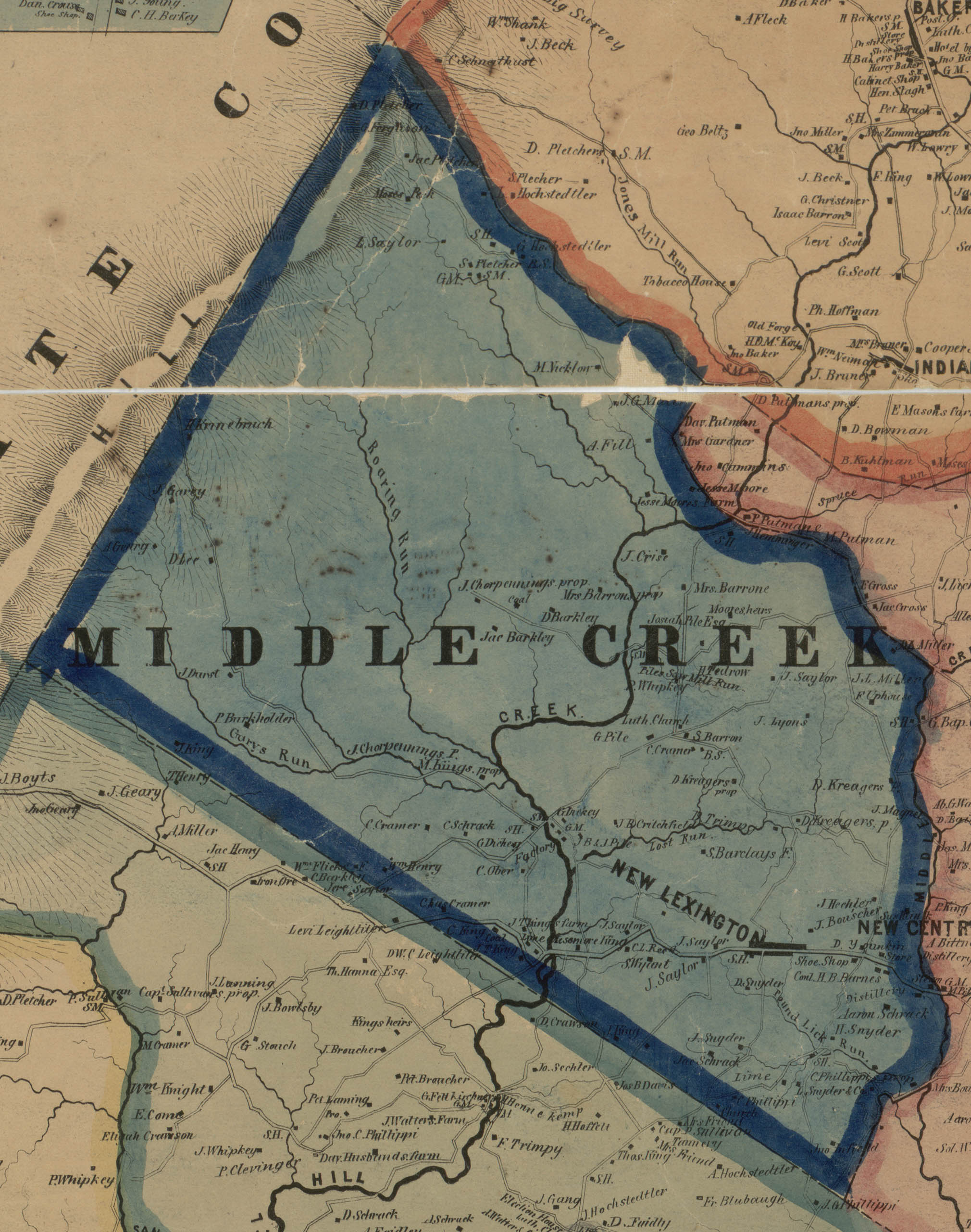
Middlecreek Township, Somerset County, Pennsylvania, 1860

Elias Stahl began a store in the area that became Middlecreek Township about 1840. The township was organized in 1853. Philip King built the first gristmill and first sawmill about 1880. The Miller's Store, Laurel Hill RDA, King's Bridge, and Barronvale Bridge are listed on the National Register of Historic Places.

== Geography ==
According to the United States Census Bureau, the township has a total area of 33.6 square miles (87.0 km^{2}), of which 33.5 square miles (86.8 km^{2}) is land and 0.1 square miles (0.2 km^{2}) (0.24%) is water. Middlecreek Township is bordered by Jefferson Township to the northeast, Milford Township to the east, Upper Turkeyfoot Township to the south, and Fayette County to the west. Both Pennsylvania Route 281 and Pennsylvania Route 653 pass through Middlecreek Township, forming a concurrency for the section between New Lexington and New Centerville. The borough of Seven Springs is located at the northern tip of Middlecreek Township, spilling over into Fayette County.

Laurel Hill Creek flows through Middlecreek Township, with tributaries such as Allen Creek, Garys Run, Blue Hole Creek, Cole Run, Showman Run, Fall Creek, and Lost Creek joining its stream before it enters Upper Turkeyfoot Township. Forbes State Forest and Laurel Hill State Park are located in Middlecreek Township. Camp T. Frank Soles of the YMCA of Greater Pittsburgh is also located in the township, at Lake Tris.

== Demographics ==
Historical population
Census	Pop.	Note	%±
2010	875		—
2020	831		−5.0%
2021 (est.)	823		−1.0%
U.S. Decennial Census

At the 2000 census there were 797 people, 345 households, and 230 families living in the township. The population density was 23.8 people per square mile (9.2/km^{2}). There were 688 housing units at an average density of 20.5/sq mi (7.9/km^{2}). The racial makeup of the township was 99.25% White, 0.13% Native American, and 0.63% from two or more races. Hispanic or Latino of any race were 0.63%.

Of the 345 households 23.5% had children under the age of 18 living with them, 57.4% were married couples living together, 6.7% had a female householder with no husband present, and 33.3% were non-families. 28.1% of households were one person and 12.2% were one person aged 65 or older. The average household size was 2.30 and the average family size was 2.82.

The age distribution was 19.9% under the age of 18, 6.1% from 18 to 24, 27.7% from 25 to 44, 30.4% from 45 to 64, and 15.8% 65 or older. The median age was 43 years. For every 100 females there were 94.4 males. For every 100 females age 18 and over, there were 97.5 males.

The median household income was $35,000 and the median family income was $36,250. Males had a median income of $29,327 versus $20,156 for females. The per capita income for the township was $19,066. About 9.5% of families and 12.1% of the population were below the poverty line, including 24.0% of those under age 18 and 13.5% of those age 65 or over.
