= Pennsylvania Route 669 =

State highway in Somerset County, Pennsylvania, US

Pennsylvania Route 669

Route information
- Maintained by PennDOT
- Length: 5.824 mi (9.373 km)
- Existed: 1963–present

Major junctions
- South end: MD 669 at the Maryland state line in Elk Lick Township
- North end: US 219 in Salisbury

Location
- Country: United States
- State: Pennsylvania
- Counties: Somerset

Highway system
- Pennsylvania State Route System; Interstate; US; State; Scenic; Legislative
← PA 666	→ PA 670

Pennsylvania Route 669 (PA 669) is a 5.82-mile-long (9.37 km) state highway located in Somerset County in Pennsylvania. The southern terminus is at the Maryland state line in Elk Lick Township, where Maryland Route 669 (MD 669) and Springs Road cross the state line from U.S. Route 40 Alternate (US 40 Alt.). The route heads along Springs Road and Ord Street through its rural and residential alignment. The northern terminus is at the intersection with US 219 (Grant Street) in the borough of Salisbury. The route was designated in 1963, and a renumbered MD 417 was soon matched up over the state line in Maryland.

== Route description ==
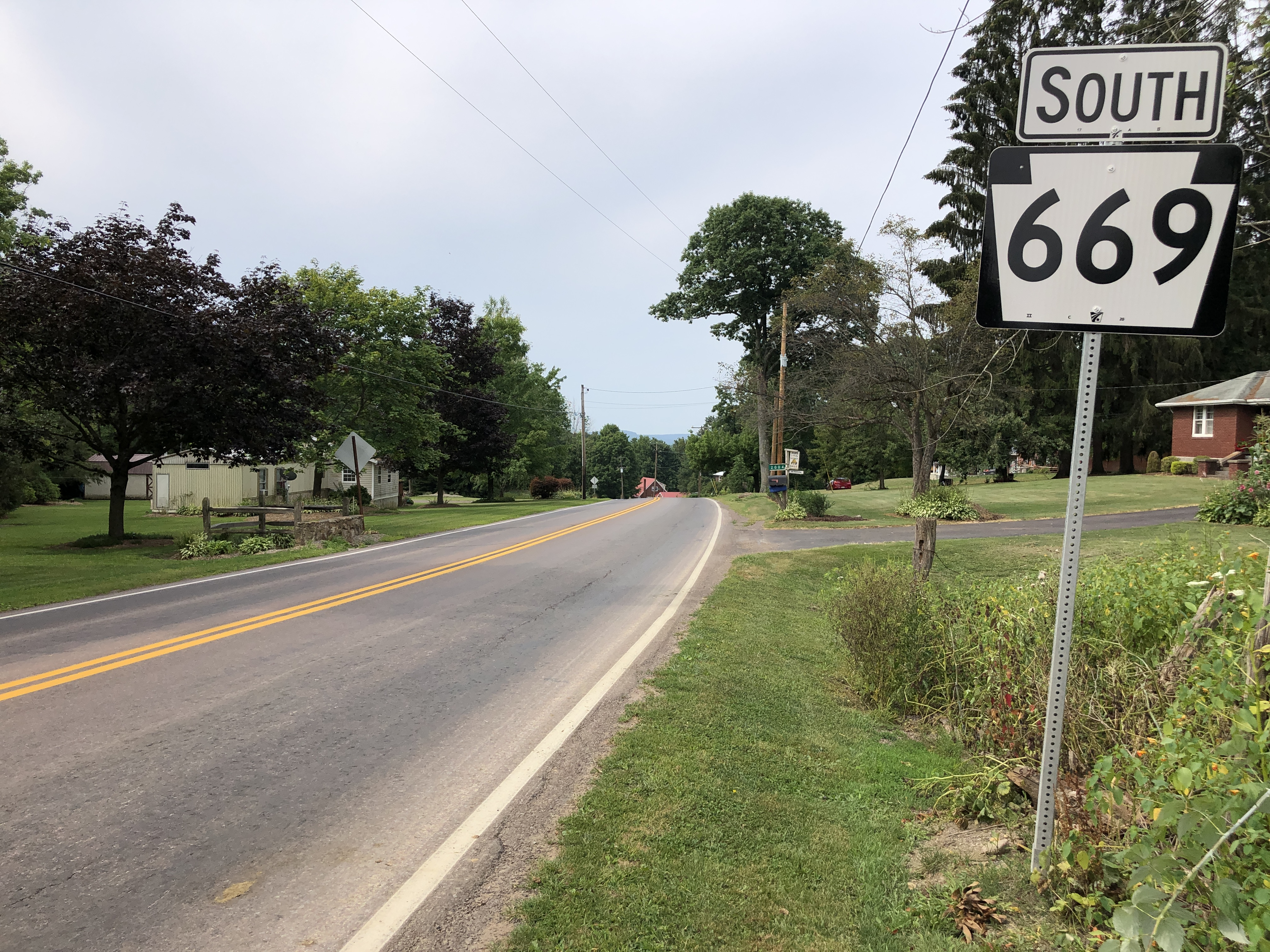
PA 669 southbound approaching the Maryland state line in Elk Lick Township

PA 669 begins at the state line as a continuation of MD 669 in the community of Elk Lick Township. The route progresses northward as Springs Road, passing through the rural regions of southern central Pennsylvania. This section of Somerset County is home to the Somerset Amish Settlement. Around the intersection with Ash Hill Road, the highway passes a light demographic of homes, but as PA 669 turns to the northwest at Upper Springs Road, begins to grow. The highway enters the community of Springs, a portion of Elk Lick Township. Through Springs, PA 669 becomes surrounded by light forestry and residences, turning to the north once again at an intersection with Shoemaker Hill Road. For a short stretch after Shoemaker Hill Road, PA 669 becomes a rural highway, crossing through fields. However, this changes as the highway enters the community of Niverton. In Niverton, PA 669 passes some residences and a large lumber yard, but after curving eastward at Fisher Road and Savage Road, Springs Road and PA 669 return to their rural nature.

PA 669 westward does continue eastward through Niverton, but soon turns southeastward into a short residential portion surrounded by fields. At the intersection with Oak Dale Road, the highway begins a curve back to the northeast, entering the small community of Sylvan Lane soon after. In Sylvan Lane, PA 669 continues its small community nature, and continues northeastward through rural Somerset County before entering the borough of Salisbury. After making a large curve to the north, the highway continues through rural Salisbury, paralleling the Casselman River. PA 669 enters West Salisbury and intersects with Saint Paul Road, where the highway turns eastward on a bridge across the river. After crossing the river, PA 669 becomes known as Ord Street and enters downtown Salisbury. There, the highway passes several residences before intersecting and terminating at an intersection with US 219 (Grant Street). Ord Street continues eastward until changing names to Engles Mills Road soon after.

== History ==
During the 1930s, the Maryland Department of Highways began the modernization of Springs Road on their side of the border to basic state highway standards. PA 669 was first designated along its current alignment in 1963 from the Maryland state line to the borough of Salisbury and the intersection with US 219; the connecting road in Maryland was renumbered from MD 417 to MD 669. The two bridges PA 669 uses to cross waterways in Salisbury and West Salisbury have both been deemed structurally deficient by the United States Department of Transportation. The one over the Casselman River in Salisbury was constructed in 1922 and handles an average of 1,469 vehicles per day. The second bridge, the one over Tub Mill Run in West Salisbury is in similar shape, but constructed three years later.

== Major intersections ==
The entire route is in Somerset County.

Location	mi	km	Destinations	Notes
Elk Lick Township	0.000	0.000	MD 669 south (Springs Road)	Maryland state line; southern terminus of PA 669
Salisbury	5.824	9.373	US 219 (Grant Street) – Meyersdale, Grantsville	Northern terminus of PA 669; Ord Street continues eastward from US 219
1.000 mi = 1.609 km; 1.000 km = 0.621 mi
