= Negro Mountain =

Mountain ridge in Pennsylvania, United States

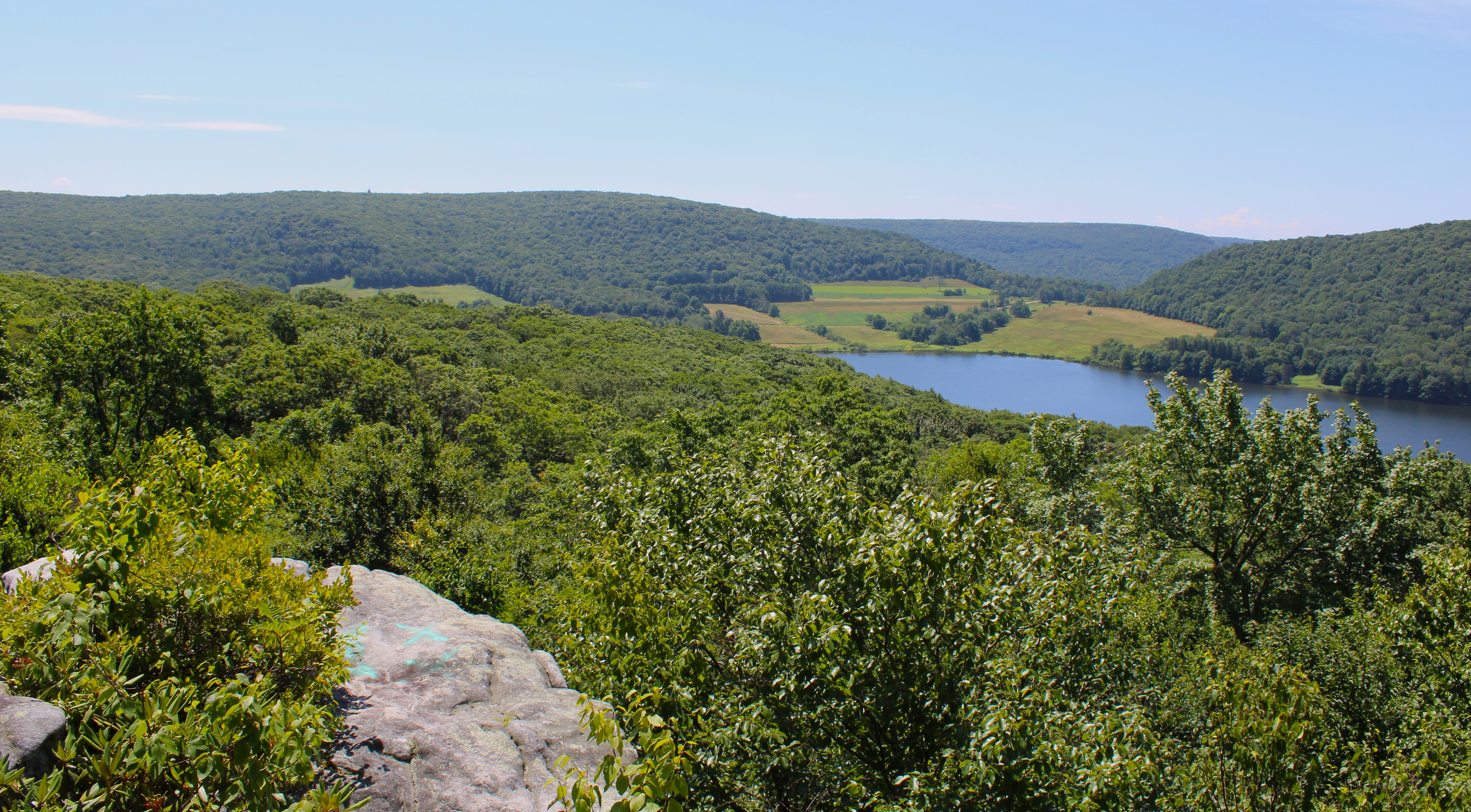
- Negro Mountain and Deer Valley Lake

Highest point
- Elevation: 3,213 ft (979 m)
- Coordinates: 39°47′10″N 79°10′30″W

Geography
- Location within Pennsylvania
- Location: Somerset County, Pennsylvania / Garrett County, Maryland, U.S.
- Parent range: Allegheny Mountains
- Topo map(s): USGS Markelton, Meyersdale (PA) Quadrangle

Climbing
- First ascent: Unknown
- Easiest route: Drive up

Negro Mountain is a long ridge of the Allegheny Mountains in the eastern United States, stretching 30-mile (48 km) from Deep Creek Lake in Maryland north to the Casselman River in Pennsylvania. The summit, Mount Davis, is the highest point (3,213 feet) in Pennsylvania. Negro Mountain is flanked by Laurel Hill to the west and Allegheny Mountain to the east.

== Geography and climate ==
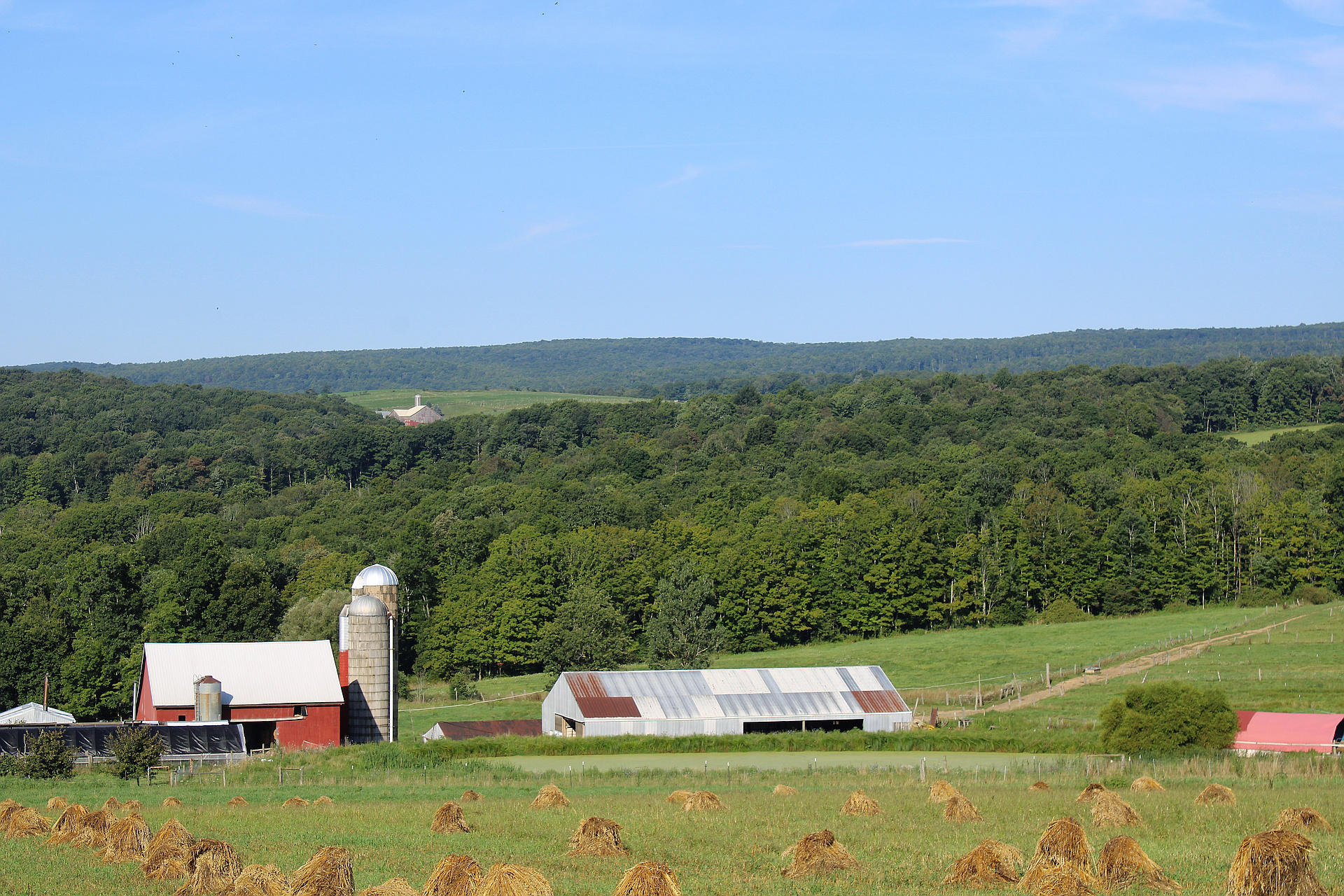
Negro Mountain from Salisbury, Pennsylvania

The mountain is flattish in appearance due to its location on the Allegheny Plateau, so its prominence is of low relief. The mountain retains its elevation above 3,000 feet (910 m) for much of its length, especially in Pennsylvania. The Negro Mountain Tunnel, built for the South Pennsylvania Railroad, is abandoned and was never used. The Mount Davis Natural Area on the Mountain is located within the Forbes State Forest and many trails take hikers throughout this alpine landscape.

Weather on the mountain is fierce, frost can occur at any time of the winter and winds and snowstorms are common. Near the summit in Pennsylvania, the trees are stunted and circular rock formations from frost heave can be readily seen.

== History ==
=== Colonial era ===
Details behind the naming of Negro Mountain are not precisely known and a number of local stories have circulated in the past. Most of these are first noted in print in publications of the mid-19th to early 20th century. The various stories seem to share a couple of elements: that of a band of white soldiers or hunters skirmishing with Native Americans on the mountain during colonial times; and the presence with the whites of an African-American companion – variously named "Nemisis" [sic] or "Goliath" indicating his great strength or size – who accompanied the whites and died valiantly during the fight.

The best documented version of the story takes place during the French and Indian War, in the year 1756, when frontiersman Colonel Thomas Cresap is known to have led a force against French and Indian forces on the mountain. A member of his force, a free Black man, was killed in the battle in a manner described by Cresap's published account in the Pennsylvania Gazette of June 17, 1756. The mountain became known as "Negro Mountain" in his honor. While many of the later, 19th century, histories contain embellishments that contemporary accounts cannot confirm, it is known that Cresap set forth on his incursion in May, 1756 accompanied by a band of frontiersman and woodsmen he had gathered, plus elements of the 1st Virginia Regiment, 17th company 'Rangers', under the command of Lt. Gist.

A letter from Adam Stephen to George Washington dated May 29, 1756 describes this battle:

You have no doubt heard of the Party of Volunters who went out under command of Colo. Cressop;1 He returned about noon with about 60 of them & Six of the Nottawaies—About bare Camp,2 his men mutinied, Some were for one thing and some for another—Lt Gist went from this place with him, with Eighteen men of the Regimt and Seven Indians—In Compliance with the mutinous tempers of the men rather than with any reasonable view they divided their men—Mr Cressop with the men under his Command Set off to fall in upon Y—Youghgane above the G. Crossing, whilst Lt Gist marchd with the Soldiers, Indian Capt. Tom,3 & Sixteen Volunteers Straight to it, and about a Quarter of a mile above the Spring on the Top of the mountains fell in with a party of the Enemy. The Skirmish lasted near an hour, The Enemy behaved with great Resolution and constantly aim’d at Surrounding our men, who on their part behavd extreamly well, prevented the Enemies designs and, According to our Acct, killed Six of them, with the loss of two of themselves—There are only two of the men who were in that engagemt come in yet. They overtook Mr Cressop on his Return, with the numr abov[e] mentd, instead of marching for the River, which I am afraid will lead Mr Gist into a mistaske—In their Return they fell in with three or four Indians,4 one of Whom they Scalpd, & wounded two more mortally, but his Men were in such a pannick that he could not prevail on them to Stay and look for them.

Another version of the story has a Captain Andrew Friend on a hunting trip on the mountain with a few companions. The party was attacked by Native Americans and during the ensuing skirmish, an African-American servant of Friend was gravely wounded and died the following morning on the mountain. Again, the mountain where he died defending the life of his master was named in his honor.

Yet another version, this time from local family lore, tells of:

John Hyatt, one of the early settlers, [who] was a native of Maryland. He came with several others, accompanied by a number of slaves, to Turkey-Foot [Township] soon after the settlement began. While crossing the Negro mountain, a party of Indians fired upon them and mortally wounded one of the negroes, the strongest man in the company. A piece of a hollow log was found and placed over the negro to shelter him. Throwing it off, he said, "Save yourselves and never mind me; I shall die soon." It is said that Negro Mountain took its name from this circumstance.

The Cresap version is supported by the fact that Cresap is known to have written an account of such an expedition for Benjamin Franklin's Pennsylvania Gazette of June 17, 1756 mentioning that "an old Negro presented his gun at [the Indians]". The Maryland Gazette had already described the same expedition on June 10, 1756, mentioning that a "free Negro" had been killed in action during the fighting. It may be additionally noted that Andrew Friend and Thomas Cresap each drew pay, in 1766, from Captain Chapline's company of the Maryland Militia for frontier services. There is no record that he or Andrew Friend ever owned slaves, and as Pennsylvania residents, were unlikely to have been importing them. After the published accounts of Cresap's military action in 1756, the first recorded reference to the geographical landmark as Negro Mountain was in 1775.

There are yet other sources that claim the mountain was named because of the black shadow it casts at certain times of the day, as observed from adjacent ridges. "Negro" is the Spanish word for "Black", so if this were the case, the name would have nothing to do with the African American race, but instead was likely chosen by Spanish explorers who were known to have traversed the area during the 15th and early 16th centuries, and observed a similar phenomenon that earned the Blue Ridge Mountains their name.

=== As part of the National Road ===
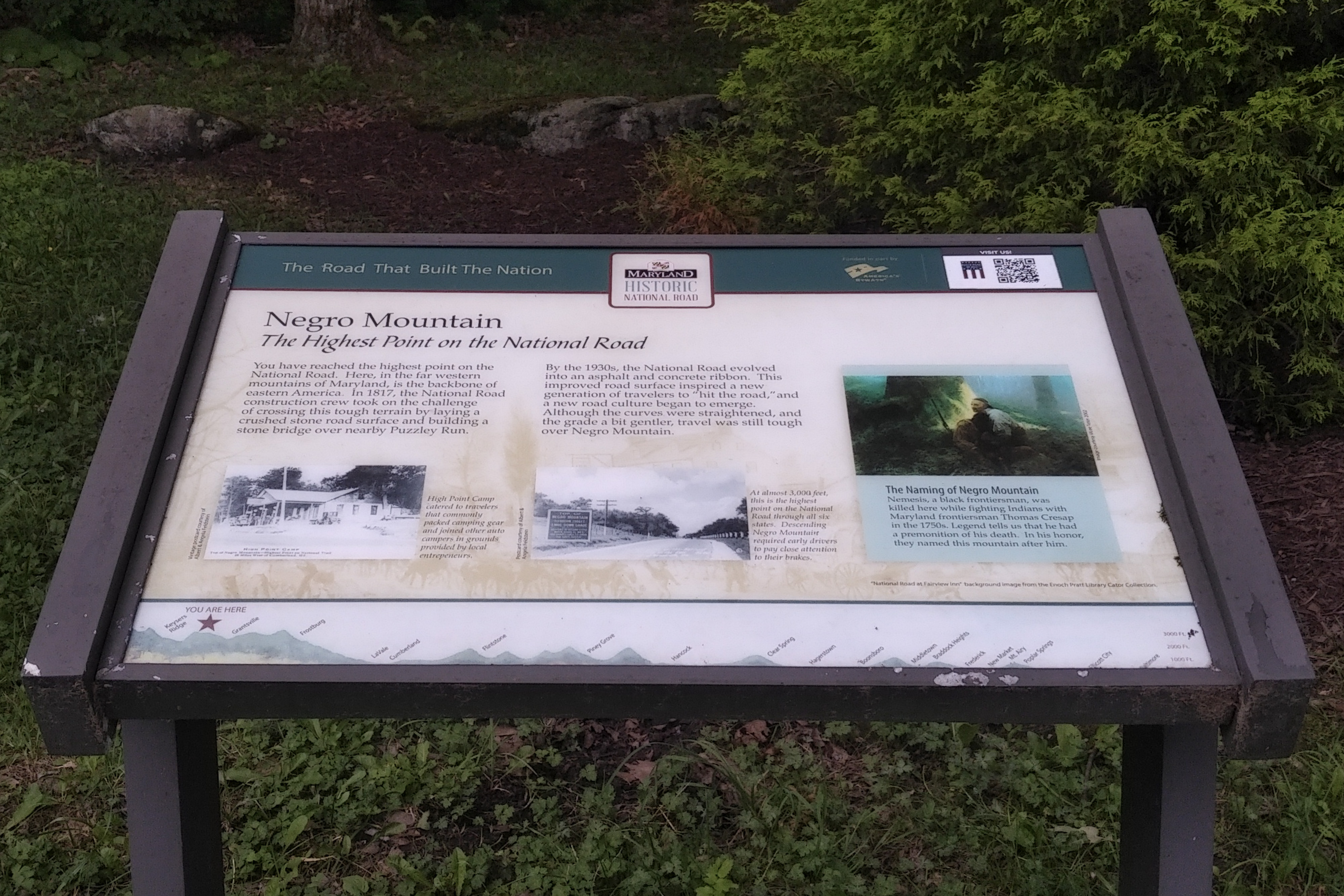
Negro Mountain Road Sign, US Highway 40

Negro Mountain played an important role in the development of the historic National Road. As the highest point on the National Road, Negro Mountain served as an important landmark for settlers traveling across the Appalachians from the Potomac River watershed to the Ohio River Valley. The relatively gentle topography of the mountain, combined with its length, favored crossing over top of Negro Mountain as opposed to seeking alternate routes around the mountain.

This route across Negro Mountain was first blazed as part of the Braddock Road in 1755. As the highest point of a major military road, Negro Mountain was location of strategic importance during the French and Indian War, hence the battles on the mountain during which its namesake died.

Negro Mountain continued to play an important part after the National Road was paved, and continues to serve as the highest point of U.S. Alternate Route 40.

== Controversy ==
In July 2007, Pennsylvania State Representative Rosita C. Youngblood (D., Philadelphia’s 198th District) called for the renaming of Negro Mountain. In a news release, she said, "Through a school project, my son and granddaughter first informed me of the name of this range and I found it to be disparaging that we have one of our great works of nature named as such… I find it disheartening for tourists who visit this range to see the plaque with the name Negro Mountain displayed on the mountainside." Maryland State Senator Lisa Gladden (D., Baltimore City) also worked to rename the mountain on the Maryland side arguing it should honor the person for whom it is named. She noted "They don't call Mount McKinley 'white man mountain.'"

However, Professor Christopher Bracey, a law professor and associate professor of African and African-American studies at Washington University in St. Louis has said, "I must confess I have a slightly different take on it than [Youngblood]… Here we have a mountain, whose name was intended to be a testament to Negro bravery. It seems rather crass and unsophisticated to name it Negro Mountain, but the intentions were strong."

On 1 August 2007, Youngblood and other lawmakers introduced House Resolution No. 378 resolving that the governor "form a commission …to study the naming of Negro Mountain and Mount Davis …[to] adopt names that accurately reflect the history of the region and the heroism displayed by the African American in the Negro Mountain conflict of 1756" and accordingly to alter "brochures, plaques and signs [to] accurately reflect the facts of this heroic historical event" (the 1921 naming of Mount Davis is now also considered controversial because it honors the white settler who once owned the land, rather than the colonial African-American).

In February 2011, nine Maryland State Senators introduced a bill to rename Negro Mountain and Polish Mountain. All four Western Maryland representatives testified against the proposed bill, which was voted down in committee.

In April 2019, the Maryland State Highway Administration removed road signs for Negro Mountain, citing concerns over racial sensitivity. Four signs were removed along Interstate 68 and U.S. Alternate Route 40.

== Other reading ==
- Wynn, Anita (2006), "The Story of Nemisis and Negro Mountain: How Far Should You Go in Reading a Public Sign?", Anthropology News, Vol. 47 Issue 7, pp 18–19; (Published Online: 24 Dec 2008); American Anthropological Association; doi:10.1525/an.2006.47.7.18.
- Bykowickz, Julie, "Controversy over 'Negro Mountain' reveals urban-rural divide" Baltimore Sunpaper (Published Online: 21 February 2011)
