= Maryland Route 669 =

State highway in Maryland, United States

Maryland Route 669
- Springs Road

Route information
- Maintained by MDSHA
- Length: 1.69 mi (2.72 km)
- Existed: 1963–present

Major junctions
- South end: US 40 Alt. in Grantsville
- North end: PA 669 near Grantsville

Location
- Country: United States
- State: Maryland
- Counties: Garrett

Highway system
- Maryland highway system; Interstate; US; State; Scenic Byways
← MD 668	→ MD 670

Maryland Route 669 (MD 669) is a state highway in the U.S. state of Maryland. Known as Springs Road, the state highway runs 1.69 miles (2.72 km) from U.S. Route 40 Alternate (US 40 Alternate) in Grantsville north to the Pennsylvania state line, where the highway continues as Pennsylvania Route 669 (PA 669). MD 669 was constructed in the early 1930s as MD 417 and renumbered in the early 1960s to match its Pennsylvania counterpart.

== Route description ==
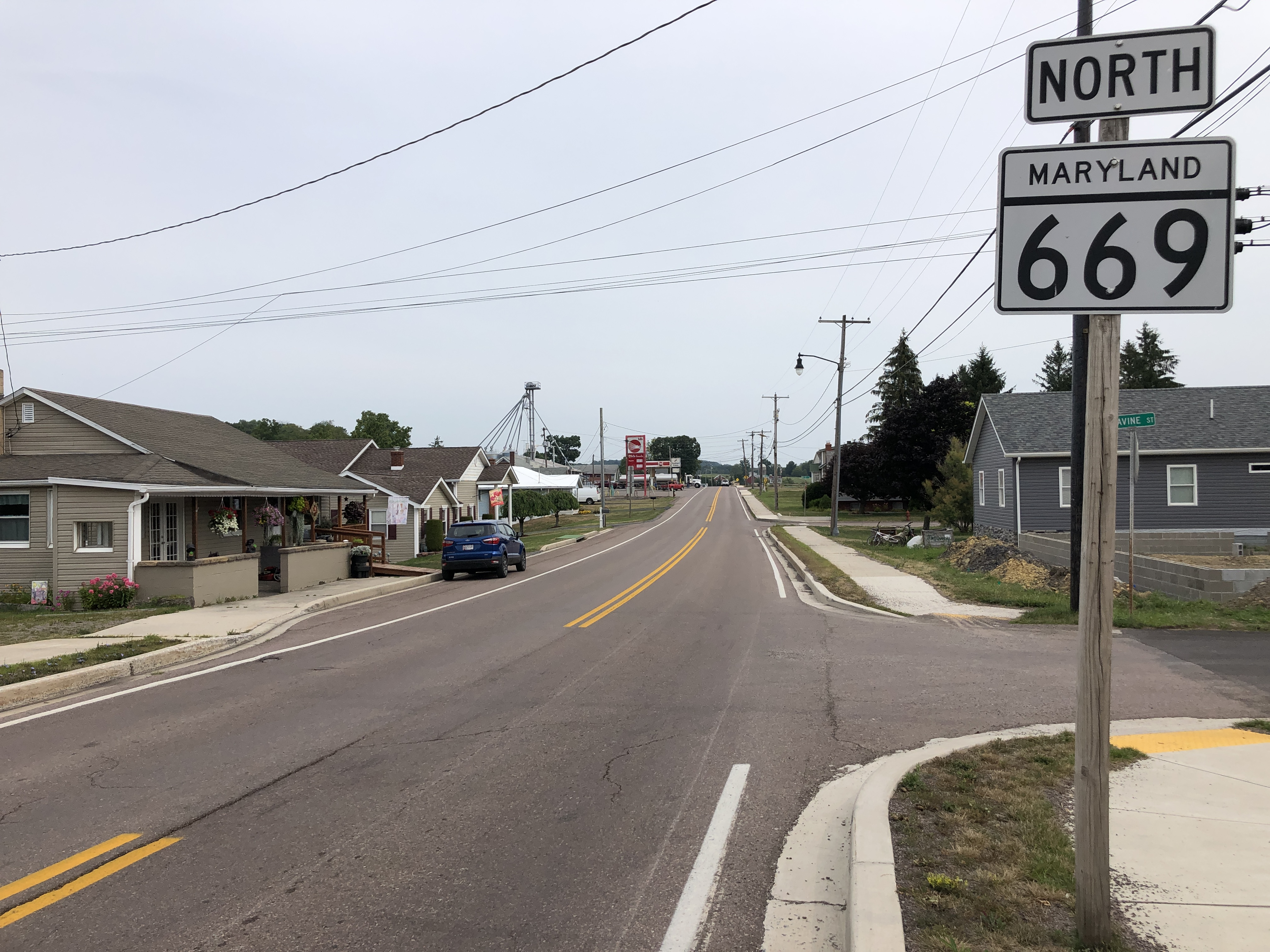
View north along MD 669 in Grantsville

MD 669 begins at US 40 Alternate (Main Street) in Grantsville. The state highway heads north as a two-lane undivided road, leaving the town limits of Grantsville and passing scattered residences and farmland. MD 669 reaches its northern terminus at the Pennsylvania state line, where Springs Road continues north toward Springs and Salisbury as PA 669.

== History ==
Springs Road was constructed as a modern highway starting in 1930. The state highway was completed by 1933 and marked as MD 417 in 1935. The Pennsylvania Department of Highways designated the adjacent portion of Springs Road part of PA 669 in 1963. The Maryland State Roads Commission renumbered MD 417 to match the Pennsylvania number the same year.

== Junction list ==
The entire route is in Garrett County.

Location	mi	km	Destinations	Notes
Grantsville	0.00	0.00	US 40 Alt. (Main Street) – Keysers Ridge, Frostburg	Southern terminus
	1.69	2.72	PA 669 north (Springs Road) – Springs, Salisbury	Pennsylvania state line; northern terminus
1.000 mi = 1.609 km; 1.000 km = 0.621 mi
