= LVRR =

LVRR may refer to one of three railroads in the United States:

- Lehigh Valley Railroad (operated 1846 to 1976 in Pennsylvania, New York, and New Jersey)
- Ligonier Valley Railroad (operated 1877 to 1952 in Pennsylvania)
- Lycoming Valley Railroad (operating from 1996 to present in Pennsylvania)
