= Quemahoning Tunnel =

Coordinates: 40.055°N 79.130°W

Overview
- Location: Somerset County, Pennsylvania
- Status: Destroyed
- System: Pittsburgh, Westmoreland and Somerset Railroad

Operation
- Opened: 1906
- Closed: 1916

Technical
- Track gauge: 1,435 mm (4 ft 8 1/2 in) standard gauge

The Quemahoning Tunnel was a tunnel that was constructed for use on the stillborn South Pennsylvania Railroad. The tunnel was located in Somerset County, Pennsylvania near the 106.3 milemarker of the Pennsylvania Turnpike.

While the South Pennsylvania Railroad never came to fruition and is known in history as "Vanderbilt's Folly", the Quemahoning Tunnel has the distinction of being the only tunnel of the nine tunnels constructed on the South Pennsylvania alignment that was actually used by railroads, as it was used by the Pittsburgh, Westmoreland and Somerset Railroad from 1909 to 1916.

When the newly formed Pennsylvania Turnpike Commission purchased the South Pennsylvania Railroad alignment in 1937, the Turnpike considered using the Quemahoning Tunnel, but instead bypassed it. The Laurel Hill Tunnel, which was also constructed by the railroad but used by the Pennsylvania Turnpike until its own bypassing in 1964, is located six miles to the west. The Negro Mountain Tunnel, also bypassed by the Turnpike during the original construction, is located ten miles to the east.

As of 2019, it was planned to be daylighted as part of the expansion of the turnpike to six lanes. In 2022 the destruction of the tunnel was reported to have been completed in preparation of the widening of the Turnpike.
