= Roaring Run Natural Area =

Natural area in Pennsylvania

- Location within Pennsylvania
- Location: Westmoreland County, Pennsylvania
- Nearest town: Jones Mills
- Coordinates: 40°03′32″N 79°18′25″W
- Area: 3,582 acres (1,450 ha)
- Established: 1975

Roaring Run Natural Area is a 3,582-acre (1,450 ha) protected area in Westmoreland County, Pennsylvania, United States. It is part of Forbes State Forest.

== Description ==
The Natural Area was established in 1975 to protect the watershed of Roaring Run nearly in its entirety. It is the largest protected area within a state forest in western Pennsylvania, and was originally donated to the state after having been acquired by Western Pennsylvania Conservancy.

Within the Natural Area's boundaries, Roaring Run descends more than 1,200 feet down the west side of Laurel Hill, and foresters have documented more than 50 of the 120 tree species that occur naturally in Pennsylvania. The area can be explored via an extensive network of hiking trails, and the long-distance Laurel Highlands Hiking Trail passes through a corner of the area.
