= Mount Davis Natural Area =

Natural area in Pennsylvania

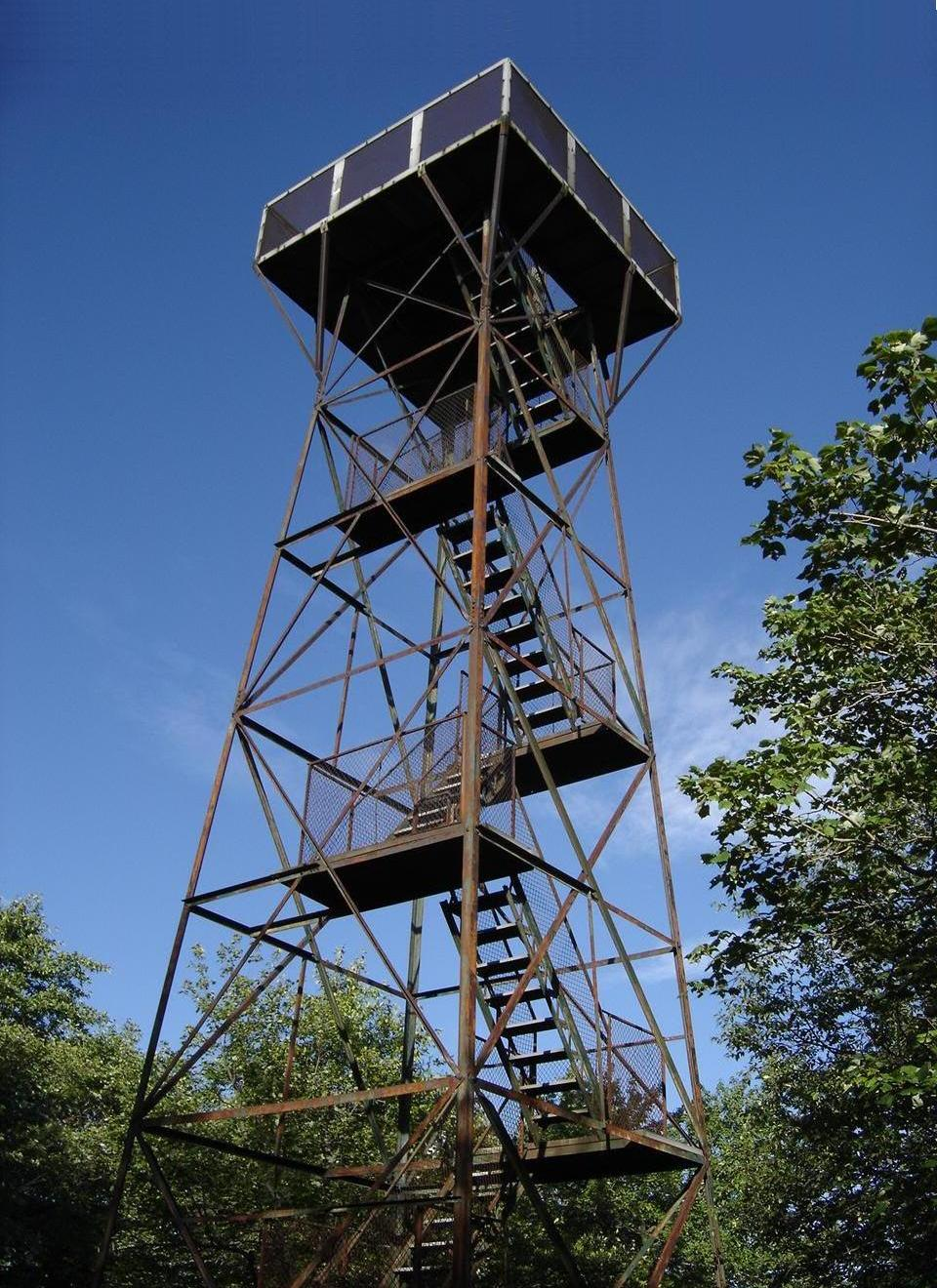
- The observation tower at Mt. Davis Natural Area

- Location within Pennsylvania
- Location: Somerset County, Pennsylvania
- Nearest town: Salisbury
- Coordinates: 39°47′10″N 79°10′35″W
- Area: 581 acres (235 ha)

Mount Davis Natural Area is a 581-acre (235 ha) protected area in Somerset County, Pennsylvania, United States. It is part of Forbes State Forest.

== Description ==
The Natural Area consists of a parcel of land on top of Mount Davis, the highest point in Pennsylvania at 3,213 feet above sea level. Visitors can use several hiking trails and an observation tower with a 360-degree view. The area features trees that have been stunted by strong winds and concentric stone circles formed by frost heaving. The area is also known for migrating birds, and it is a crucial habitat for the locally endangered Allegheny woodrat.
