= Kooser State Park =

State park in Jefferson Township, Pennsylvania, U.S.

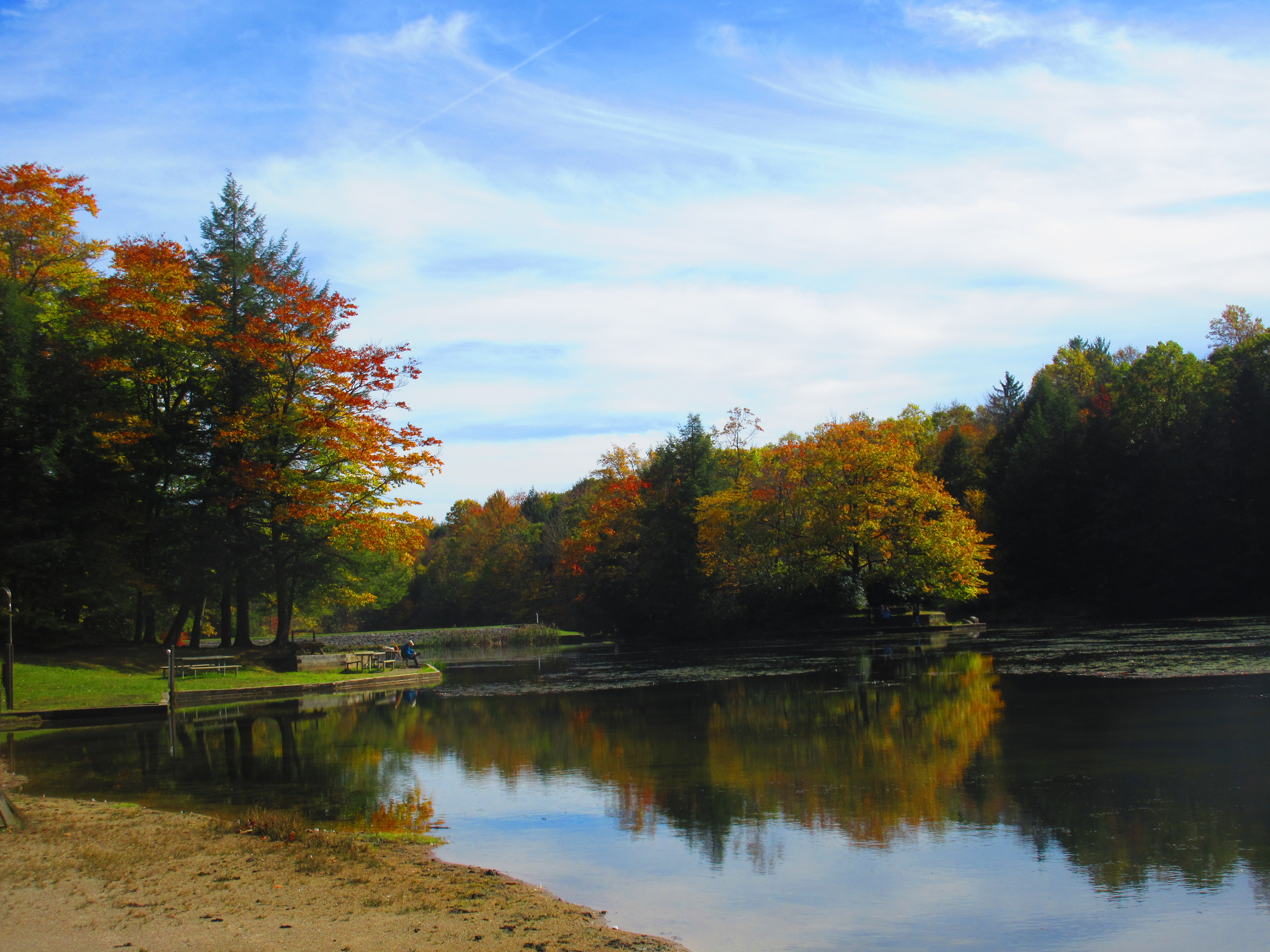

- Location within Pennsylvania Location within the United States
- Interactive map of Kooser State Park
- Location: Jefferson Township, Somerset County, Pennsylvania, United States
- Coordinates: 40°03′35″N 79°13′42″W
- Area: 250 acres (100 ha)
- Elevation: 2,313 feet (705 m)
- Established: 1922
- Administrator: Pennsylvania Department of Conservation and Natural Resources
- Website: Official website
- Pennsylvania State Parks
- Kooser State Park Family Cabin District
- U.S. National Register of Historic Places
- U.S. Historic district
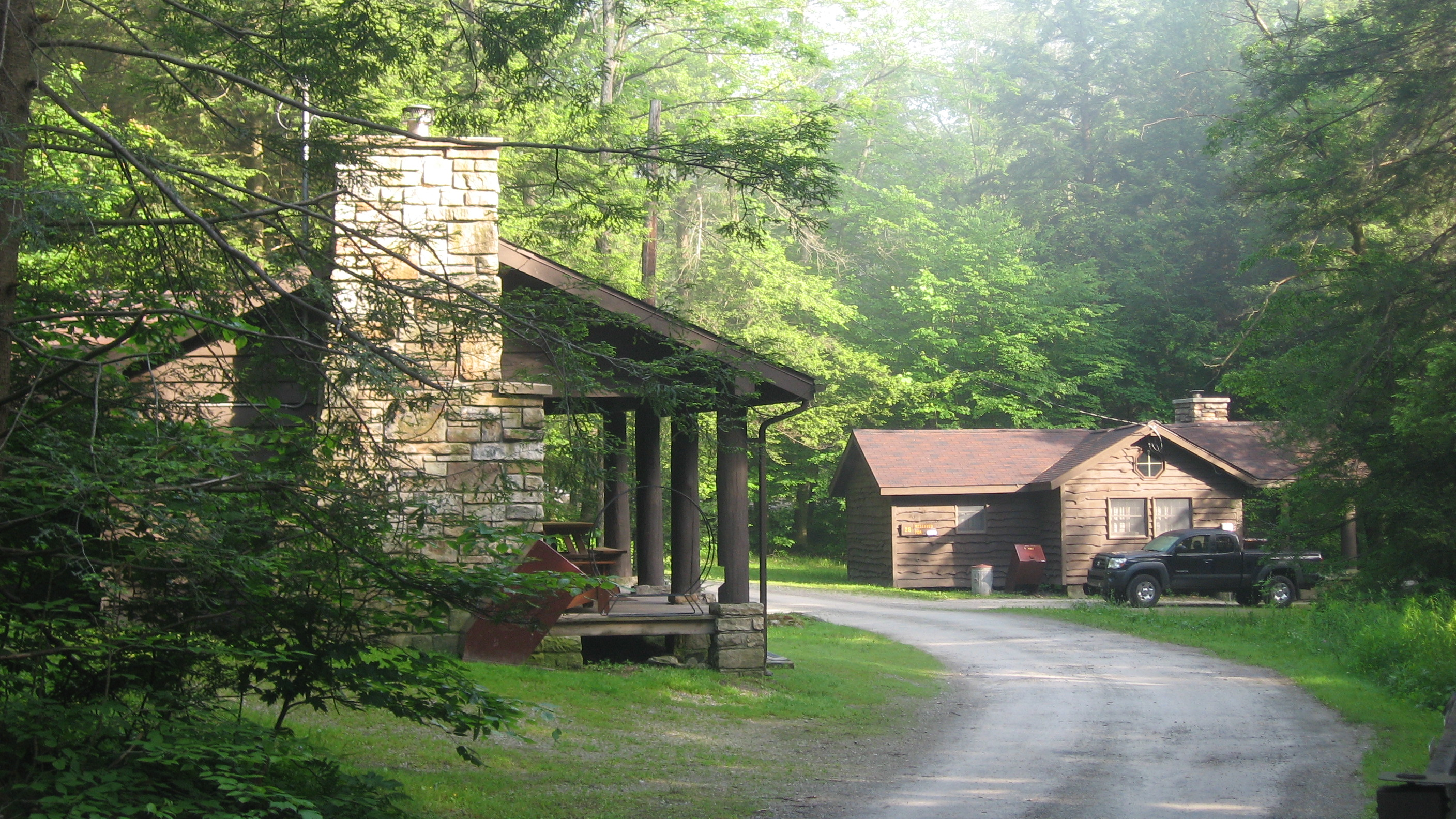
- Two of the cabins
- Nearest city: Jefferson, Pennsylvania
- Area: 9.2 acres (3.7 ha)
- Built: 1933
- Architect: Civilian Conservation Corps
- Architectural style: Log Cabin style
- MPS: Emergency Conservation Work (ECW) Architecture in Pennsylvania State Parks: 1933-1942, TR
- NRHP reference No.: 87000111
- Added to NRHP: February 12, 1987

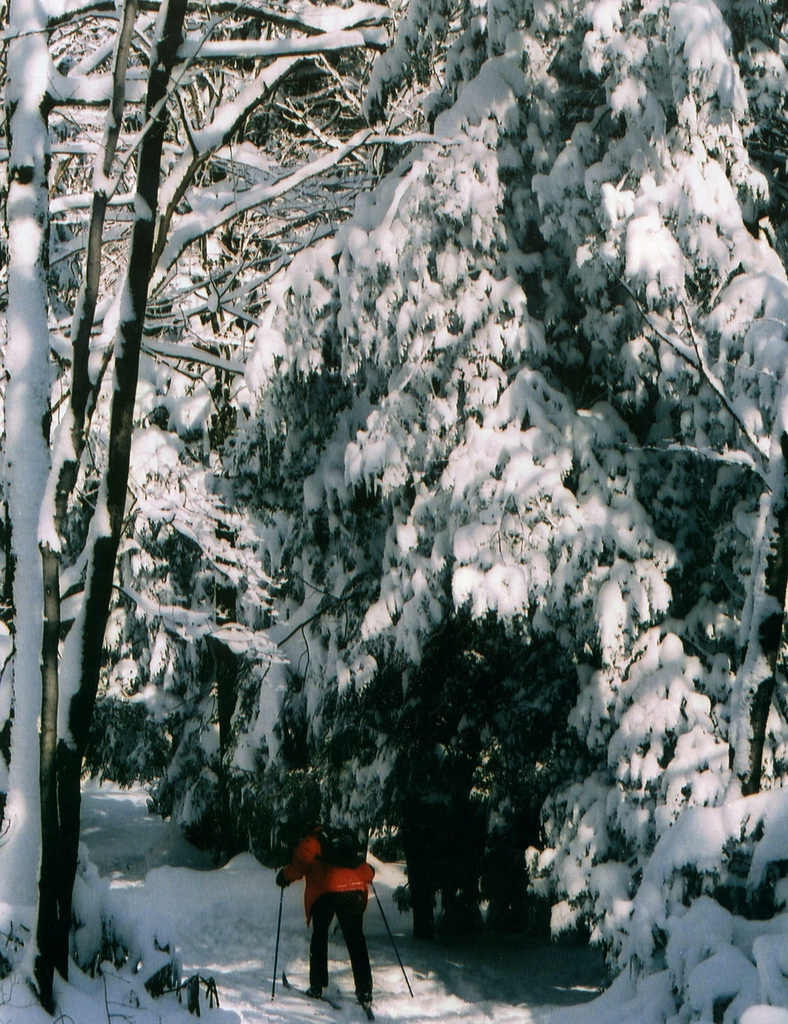
Cross country skiing during the winter season at the park.

Kooser State Park is a 250-acre (100 ha) Pennsylvania state park in Jefferson Township, Somerset County, Pennsylvania, in the United States. The park, which borders Forbes State Forest, was built in the 1930s by the Civilian Conservation Corps, who also built the 4-acre (1.6 ha) Kooser Lake by damming Kooser Run. Kooser State Park is on Pennsylvania Route 31 a one-hour drive from Pittsburgh. The park is surrounded by Forbes State Forest.

== History ==
The earliest settlers to the Kooser Run area told of an American Indian battle that took place near Kooser Run. A large number of war arrows and spearheads have since been found in the area. The area was also crossed by participants in the Whiskey Rebellion. The park is named for John Kooser. He settled near Kooser Spring in what is now the western edge of Kooser State Park.

The Commonwealth of Pennsylvania purchased the land for Kooser State Park in 1922. The land had been stripped of its old-growth forest during the lumber era that swept through Pennsylvania during the late 19th, and early 20th centuries. The forests slowly grew back with the help of the Civilian Conservation Corps. The CCC established by President Franklin D. Roosevelt during the Great Depression built a camp on the western edge of Kooser State Park. The young men of the CCC built the dam on Kooser Run creating Kooser Lake. They also built roads, outdoor fireplaces and cabins. Much of their work can still be seen today at Kooser State Park. They used the materials at hand to create the buildings and facilities of the park. The cabins are made from logs plucked from the nearby forests. They used native stone to create the fireplaces. All repairs made to the park facilities today are made with the rustic nature of the park in mind. The Kooser State Park Family Cabin District was listed on the National Register of Historic Places in 1987, as a national historic district. The district includes 13 contributing buildings.

== Recreation ==
=== Cabins and camping ===
There are nine cabins built by the CCC available for rent year-round. The cabins are primarily used by skiers after deer season until late March. The cabins are rustic. A modern showerhouse is nearby. All of the cabins are furnished with mattresses, chairs, table, stove, microwave, refrigerator, hot and cold running water, and electric lights.

The campground at Kooser State Park is open the second Friday in April and closes in mid-October. There are 47 sites that are open to tents or campers. 14 of the campsites have electric hook ups.

=== Trails ===
The trails of Kooser State Park are used for hiking and cross-country skiing. Kooser Trail is 1.5 miles (2.4 km). It is very popular with cross country skiers because of the heavy amounts of yearly snowfall. Kincora Trail is 1 mile (1.6 km) and is used by hikers and is named in honor of Father Kincora, a Roman Catholic priest from Ireland. Hunting is not permitted at Kooser State Park, but the trails are used by hunters who rent cabins at the park to reach the woods of Forbes State Forest.

=== Kooser Lake ===
Kooser Lake is a 4-acre (1.6 ha) man-made lake built during the Great Depression by the Civilian Conservation Corps. The swimming beach is open from Memorial Day weekend until the middle of September. There are no lifeguards. There is no swimming currently permitted in Kooser Lake. Boating is not permitted on Kooser Lake. It is open to fishing for trout, bass and bluegill. Swimming has not been permitted at the lake since mid-2012 due to an unhealthful algae problem. The lake remains open for fishing.
