= Negro Mountain Tunnel =

Tunnel located in Somerset County, Pennsylvania

Coordinates: 39.98978°N 78.97868°W

- Interactive map of Negro Mountain Tunnel

Overview
- Location: Somerset County, Pennsylvania
- Status: Abandoned, never used
- System: South Pennsylvania Railroad
- Crosses: Negro Mountain

Operation
- Owner: Pennsylvania Turnpike Commission

Technical
- Length: Planned: 1,100 feet (340 m); Completed: 706 feet (215 m)
- No. of tracks: 0

The Negro Mountain Tunnel is an abandoned railroad tunnel in Stonycreek Township, Somerset County, Pennsylvania. Built by the New York Central Railroad and William Henry Vanderbilt, the tunnel was one of nine built as part of the South Pennsylvania Railroad project, which was abandoned in 1885. Originally proposed to be 1,100 feet (340 m) long through Negro Mountain, only 706 feet (215 m) was built before construction was abandoned. The railroad alignment was purchased by the Pennsylvania Turnpike Commission who intended to turn the right-of-way into an automobile highway.

When inspecting the Negro Mountain Tunnel for conversion into a highway tunnel, workers found tools used by South Pennsylvania Railroad laborers left there after construction was abandoned. The original proposal for the Pennsylvania Turnpike involved building nine separate tunnels, but the Negro Mountain and Quemahoning tunnels were bypassed instead, along with the original Allegheny Mountain Tunnel. The abandoned Negro Mountain Tunnel stands next to Turnpike right-of-way milepost 116.7 (187.8 kilometerpost), 10 miles (16 km) east of the Quemahoning site, 16 miles (26 km) east of the abandoned Laurel Hill Tunnel and 7 miles (11 km) west of the Allegheny Mountain Tunnel.
