= Pittsburgh, Westmoreland and Somerset Railroad =

Pittsburgh, Westmoreland, & Somerset Railroad
Overview
- Headquarters: Somerset, Pennsylvania
- Locale: Westmoreland and Somerset County, Pennsylvania, U.S.
- Dates of operation: 1899–1916
- Successor: None

Technical
- Track gauge: 4 ft 8 1/2 in (1,435 mm) standard gauge
- Length: 25 miles (40 km)

The Pittsburgh, Westmoreland, & Somerset Railroad (PW&S) was a short-lived railroad that connected the Pennsylvania communities of Ligonier and Somerset, running over a mountain known as Laurel Hill or Laurel Mountain.

On occasion the railroad's name was spelled as the Pittsburg, Westmoreland, & Somerset, using the older spelling of Pittsburgh without the h. Although Pittsburgh is in the railroad's name, it never served that city. The word Westmoreland refers to Westmoreland County, where the town of Ligonier is located.

The railroad's sole tunnel was the Quemahoning Tunnel, also known as the Lumber Railroad Tunnel, which had originally been built for the South Pennsylvania Railroad but had not been previously used.

Although the Pennsylvania Railroad did not control the PW&S, the Pennsylvania Railroad provided construction materials. The Pennsylvania Railroad regarded the PW&S as a feeder which would compete for customers against the Baltimore and Ohio Railroad, which had viewed Somerset County as a captive customer base. However, the operational difficulties of running trains over the steep gradients of Laurel Hill prevented the PW&S from being truly competitive against the Baltimore and Ohio Railroad.

The PW&S had a very short life. Although trains began operating on the western segment near Ligonier in 1899, the complete Ligonier-Somerset route operated for only ten years (1906–1916). Little remains of the PW&S, yet it had a lasting impact in developing the area southeast of Ligonier, near present-day Rector, as a summer cottage area for Pittsburgh's elite. Laurel Summit State Park, at the mountain's crest, first became popular as a recreational destination due to PW&S excursion trains.

== History ==
Construction of the railroad actually began before it was chartered. Construction began at the western end on June 14, 1899 and it was chartered on July 20, 1899. On October 11, 1899, the right-of-way had been graded as far as Laurel Summit. Construction on the eastern segment of the railroad proceeded slowly, and it was not until May 26, 1906, that the first train traveled from Ligonier to Somerset. For passenger trains, the eastbound journey was scheduled to take 90 minutes, averaging 17 miles per hour (27 km/h) including stops. The westbound journey took ten minutes longer due to arduous uphill gradients, averaging 15 miles per hour (24 km/h) including stops. Schedules show that there were two passenger trains per day in each direction, originally consisting of two passenger coaches added to logging trains. There were also excursion trains to various points between Ligonier and Laurel Summit that were not listed in public timetables.

Andrew W. Mellon and Richard B. Mellon, whose family founded the Pittsburgh-based Mellon Bank, were instrumental in the funding of the P&WS. The Mellons also owned the Ligonier Valley Railroad, which linked the P&WS to the main line of the Pennsylvania Railroad. Also important in the railroad's founding were Charles Nelson Byers and Lauros H. Allen, whose Byers-Allen Lumber Company owned much of the land traversed by the railroad.

The railroad served the Ligonier-Somerset route for only ten years. Both passenger and freight services ended on September 23, 1916. The major reason for closure was deforestation along the route due to logging, which was the railroad's original purpose. As with many railroads, the advent of the automobile made the passenger service obsolete.

Like many small railroads of that era, the PW&S was riven with fraudulent accounting practices. The Byers-Allen Lumber Company accounted for almost 90% of the railroad's operations and also shared top executives with the railroad, and as a result, the PW&S hauled the lumber company's freight for free. Because the financial statements showed no profits, bondholders were paid their interest in the form of new bonds, causing a pyramiding of the railroad's indebtedness. Due to these financial problems, employees would go as long as three months without pay despite working 100-hour weeks.

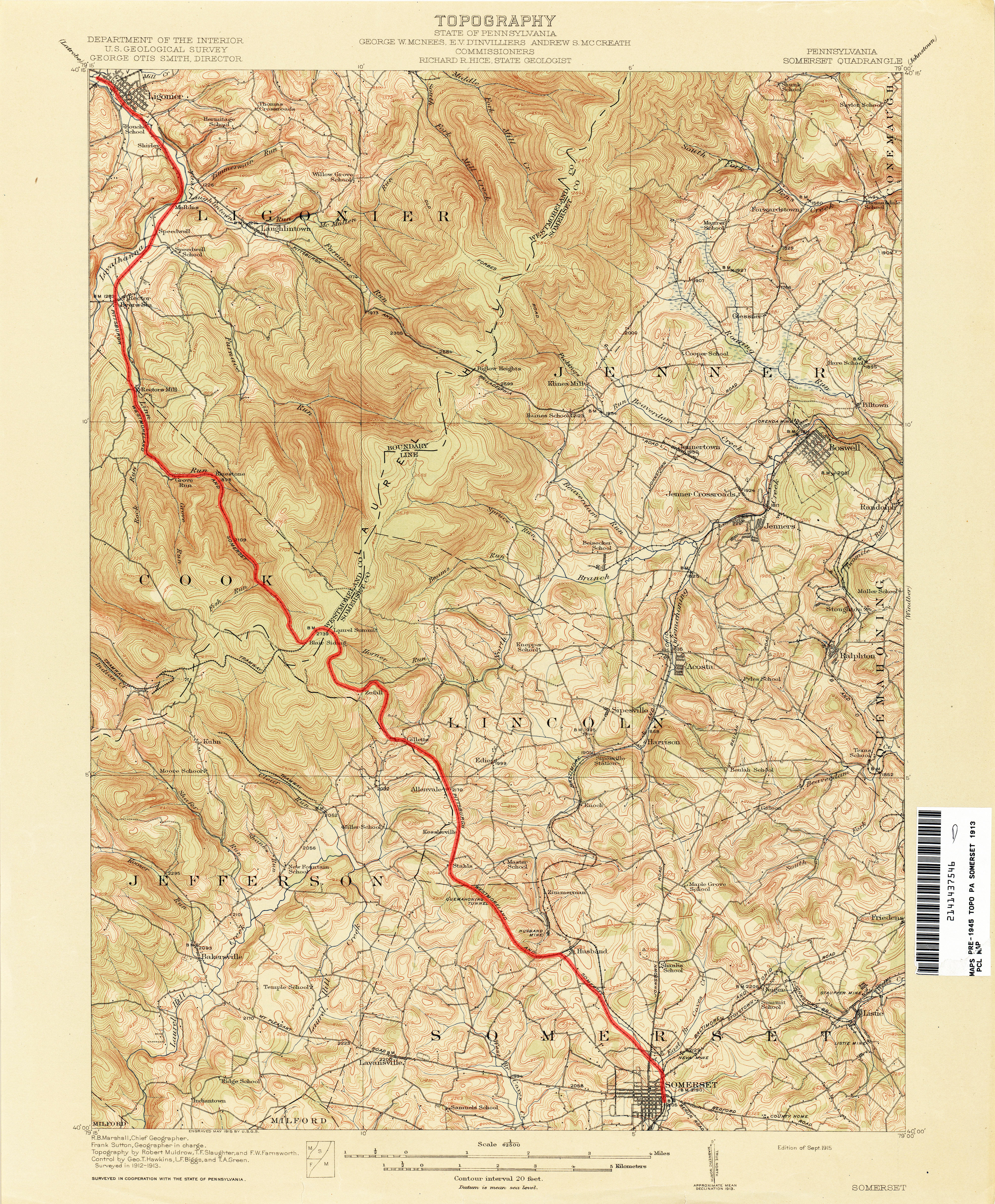
Map showing the route of the railroad in red

== Route and Stations ==
Stations are listed from west to east. Distances shown are from Ligonier:

- Ligonier (0 miles (0 km)) was the western terminus of the railroad, where it connected with the Ligonier Valley Railroad and thence to the Pennsylvania Railroad main line. Running southeasterly from Ligonier, the PW&S followed Loyalhanna Creek.
- Market Street was shown in the 1906 timetable but not the 1916 timetable. This would have been located where the current U.S. Route 30 crosses Ligonier's Market Street.
- Mellon’s Crossing was shown in the 1906 timetable but not the 1916 timetable. It would have been located at the northern edge of the current-day Rolling Rock Racecourse.
- Speedwell would have been located at the southern edge of the current-day Rolling Rock Racecourse. This station was named after the Speedwell Carding Mill, an early textile mill. The textile mill still stands, although now used for other purposes by Rolling Rock Club.
- Byers (5.02 miles (8.08 km)), also known as Mechanicsburg, is now known as Rector. The community had been named for Charles Nelson Byers, co-founder of the Byers-Allen Lumber Company, which had been instrumental in creating the PW&S. After this station, the railroad began to climb the west face of Laurel Hill, and its right-of-way is now used by Linn Run Road. The railroad ran through land that today comprises Linn Run State Park.
- Grove Run was shown in the 1906 timetable but not the 1916 timetable.
- Bluestone 10.03 miles (16.14 km). Using current-day points of reference, this is where Linn Run Road intersects the eastern boundary of Linn Run State Park. Bluestone refers to a type of rock that was quarried in the area. There is nothing remaining to suggest a settlement had ever been here. At this point, the right-of-way enters Forbes State Forest.
- Water Station was shown in the 1906 timetable but not the 1916 timetable.
- Laurel Summit (13.04 miles (20.99 km)) is in current-day Laurel Summit State Park. The railroad built a pavilion here for summer dances. At this point, there was a southward spur to the community of Kuhn, built in 1908 and owned by Blair Lumber Company. Immediately to the east of Laurel Summit, the right-of-way passes from Westmoreland County into Somerset County, and runs down the east face of Laurel Hill. The segment between Laurel Summit and Allenvale constituted the steepest segment of the route. There were emergency turn-offs for runaway trains, and the default position of the switch was to keep it turned to the emergency runaway track. Therefore, a train would have had to make numerous stops while a crew member disembarked, turned the switch toward the main line, and then reverted the switch toward the runaway track after the train had passed.
- Zufall was shown in the 1906 timetable but not the 1916 timetable. At this point, assuming one is travelling eastward, the PW&S begins to use the trackbed that had been constructed for the South Pennsylvania Railroad for the next (4.85 miles (7.81 km)).
- Gillette was shown in the 1906 timetable but not the 1916 timetable.
- Allenvale (19.04 miles (30.64 km)). East of Allenvale is the 2,000 feet (0.61 km) Gasteiger Cut and the 700 feet (0.21 km) Quemahoning Tunnel, both of which had initially been constructed for the South Pennsylvania Railroad.
- Husband (23.01 miles (37.03 km)) was another P&WS station along the South Pennsylvania Railroad right-of-way, named for Herman Husband who was the first non-aboriginal settler of Somerset and instrumental in the formation of Somerset County.
- Somerset (25.06 miles (40.33 km)) was the eastern terminus of the railroad, with a connection to the Baltimore and Ohio Railroad.

== See also ==
- Ligonier, Pennsylvania
- Ligonier Valley Railroad
- South Pennsylvania Railroad
- Somerset, Pennsylvania
