= Mount Davis (Pennsylvania) =

Highest point in Pennsylvania

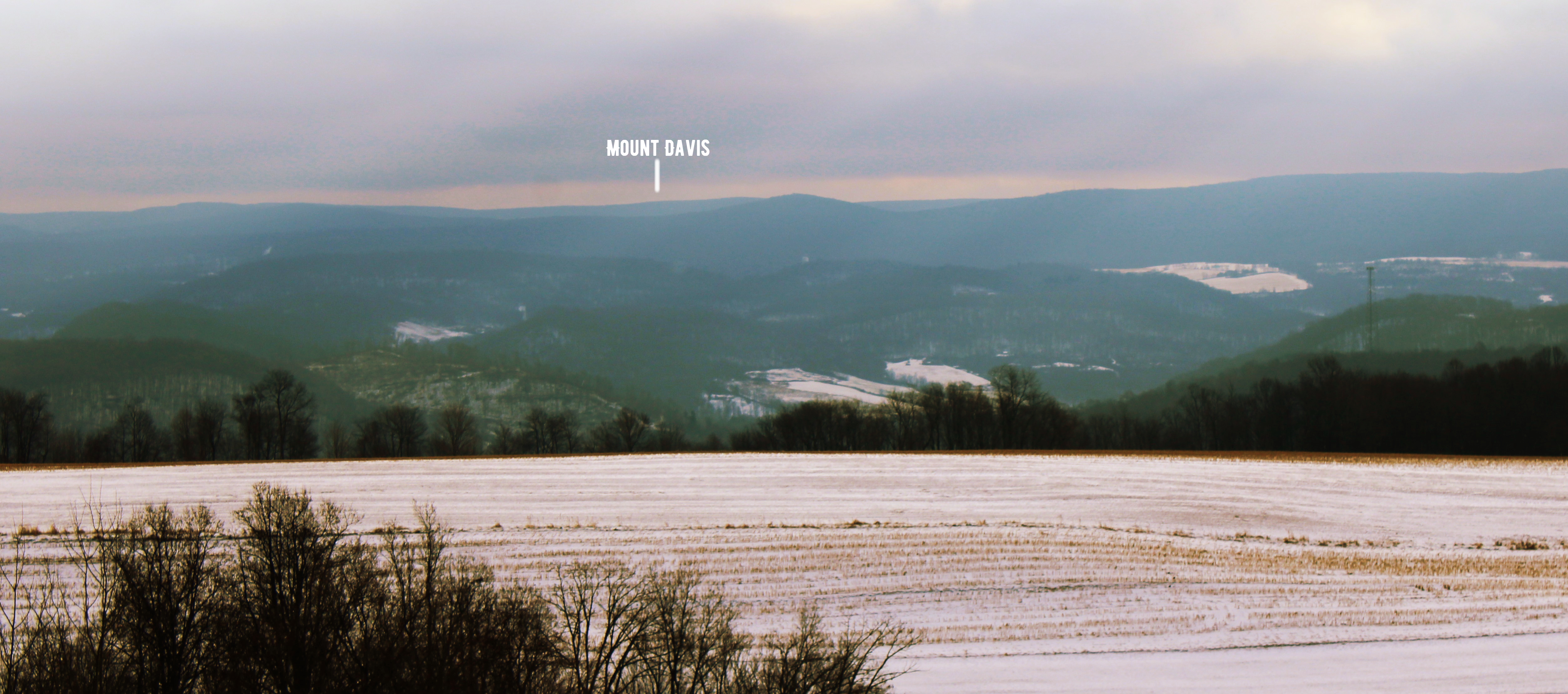
- Mount Davis as seen from Laurel Hill.

Highest point
- Elevation: 3,213 ft (979 m)
- Prominence: 653 ft (199 m)
- Listing: U.S. state high point 33rd
- Coordinates: 39°47′10″N 79°10′33″W

Geography
- Location within Pennsylvania
- Location: Somerset County, Pennsylvania, U.S.
- Parent range: Allegheny Mountains
- Topo map(s): USGS Markleton and Meyersdale

Climbing
- Easiest route: Paved road leads almost directly to the summit, with a very short trail the rest of the way.

Mount Davis (3,213 ft or 979 m) is the highest point in Pennsylvania. Located in Forbes State Forest near the hamlet of Markleton in Elk Lick Township, Somerset County, it lies on a gentle crest of a 30-mile (50 km) ridge extending from central Somerset County southward into Garrett County, Maryland, where it is known as Negro Mountain. A parcel of land on top of the mountain has been protected as Mount Davis Natural Area.

== Description ==
The high point was named for John Nelson Davis, an early settler, American Civil War veteran, surveyor, and naturalist known for his studies of the mountain's flora and fauna. During the Civil War, Davis served in Company E, 102nd Pennsylvania Infantry.

The summit of Mt. Davis may be ascended by automobile (the automobile-accessible road brings visitors close to the high point spot) or a number of hiking trails. Its surroundings are noted for their patterns of unusual circular stone formed by periglacial action. A metal observation tower with a relief map of the region stands near the true high point. Mount Davis ranks 33rd on the list of highest natural points in each U.S. state.

== History ==
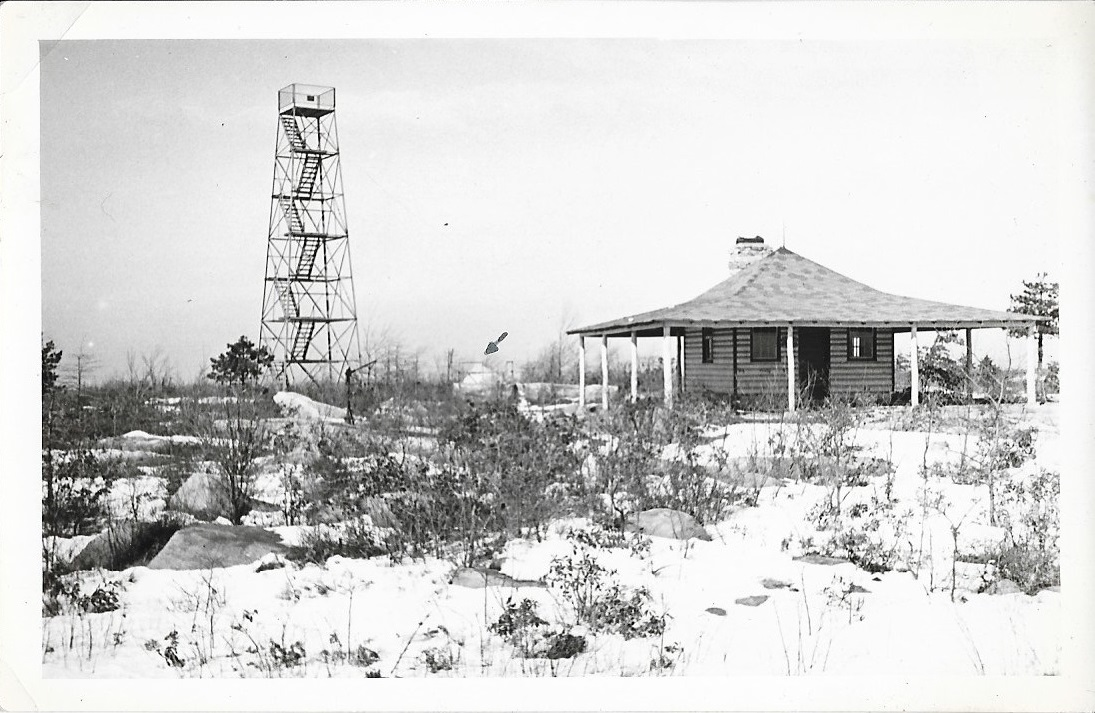
View Of Mount Davis, circa 1939

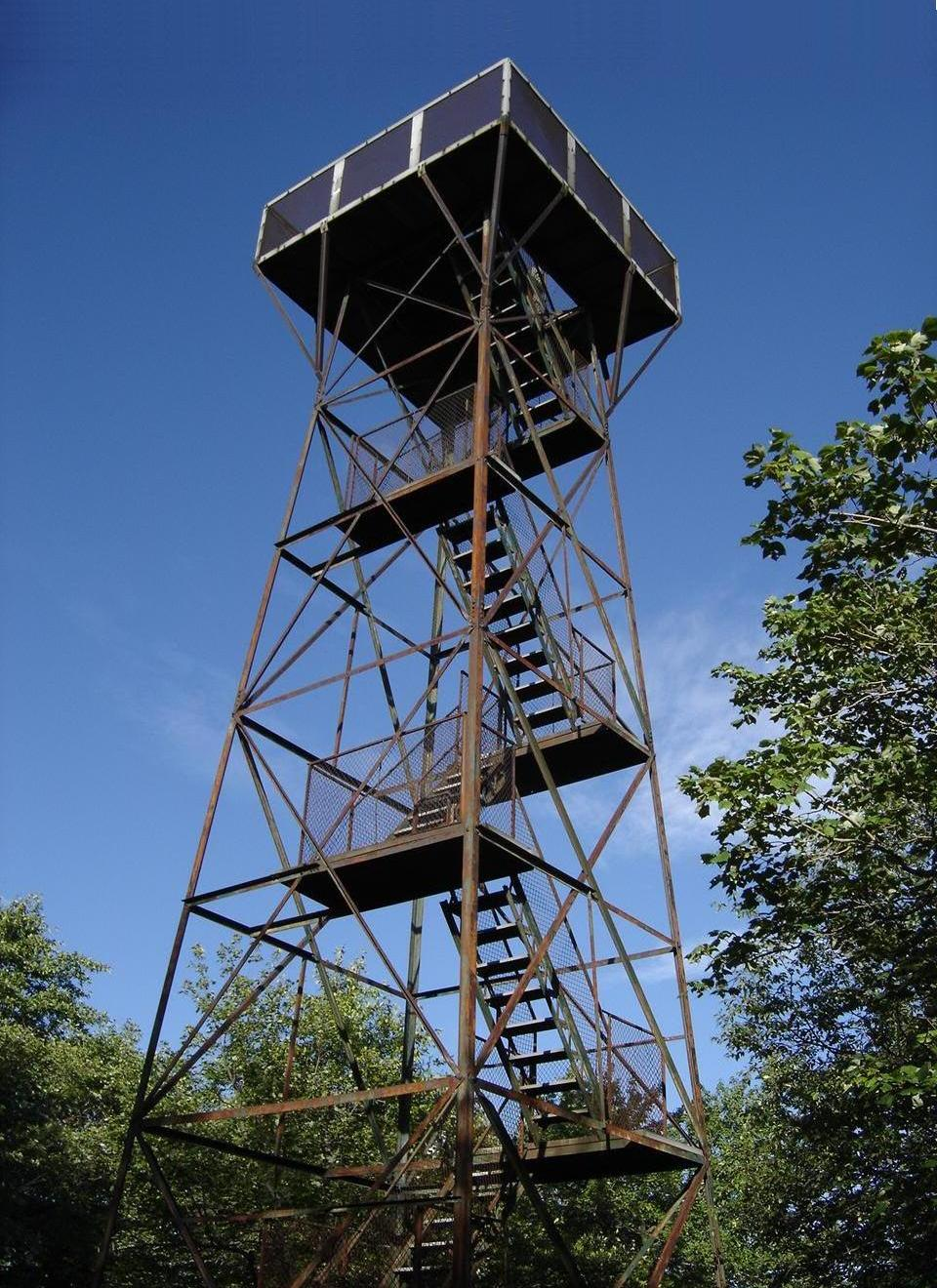
The Mount Davis observation tower in 2012

In 1921, the USGS established that Mount Davis (3,213 ft or 979 m) was the highest peak in Pennsylvania. Previously, the highest peak was believed to be Bedford County's Blue Knob. On June 18, 1921, the local chamber of commerce held a ceremony to celebrate the newly named highest point in Pennsylvania.

== Trails ==
Trails in the park include:

- High Point Trail: 0.8 miles (1.3 km)
- Mt. Davis Trail: 0.1 miles (0.2 km)
- Shelter Rock Trail: 1 mile (1.6 km)
- Tub Mill Run Trail: 2.8 miles (4.5 km)
- Timberslide Trail: 0.5 miles (0.8 km)
- Laurel Run Trail: 1.9 miles (3.1 km)
- Wolf Rock Trail: 0.8 miles (1.3 km)
- Shelter Rock Road: 1.6 miles (2.6 km)
- Livengood Trail: 1.1 miles (1.8 km)

== Climate ==
Climate on the peak is warm in the summer, and cold in the winter. Like much of Pennsylvania, Mount Davis can experience heavy winds, rain, and hail in the summer, with ice storms and blizzards in the winter. Temperature extremes range from −33 to 84 °F (−36 to 29 °C), though frosts have been recorded in every month of the year. Summer conditions are generally mild and winters are characterized by a lot of snowfall. Average annual precipitation ranges from 38 to 42 inches (970 to 1,070 mm).

Mount Davis has a humid continental climate that is affected by the high elevation significantly enough that the area feels slightly more like a cooler version of the climate zone during the winter months. Due to its high elevation, the area is colder much of the winter than Altoona, Johnstown, or State College, despite being well south of those locations. During the summer months, the area is a retreat for other Pennsylvanians with high temperatures being cooler on average than Pittsburgh and eastern portions of the state. Mount Davis recorded many impressive record lows and is quite close to the state's all-time coldest temperature.

Climate data for Mount Davis, Pennsylvania
| Month | Jan | Feb | Mar | Apr | May | Jun | Jul | Aug | Sep | Oct | Nov | Dec | Year |
|---|---|---|---|---|---|---|---|---|---|---|---|---|---|
| Record high °F (°C) | 59 (15) | 66 (19) | 69 (21) | 75 (24) | 79 (26) | 84 (29) | 86 (30) | 83 (28) | 79 (26) | 67 (19) | 64 (18) | 60 (16) | 86 (30) |
| Mean daily maximum °F (°C) | 26 (−3) | 29 (−2) | 35 (2) | 49 (9) | 60 (16) | 68 (20) | 74 (23) | 74 (23) | 65 (18) | 53 (12) | 41 (5) | 30 (−1) | 50 (10) |
| Mean daily minimum °F (°C) | 7 (−14) | 10 (−12) | 17 (−8) | 25 (−4) | 34 (1) | 44 (7) | 55 (13) | 51 (11) | 44 (7) | 29 (−2) | 24 (−4) | 13 (−11) | 29 (−1) |
| Record low °F (°C) | −38 (−39) | −31 (−35) | −24 (−31) | −5 (−21) | 12 (−11) | 19 (−7) | 32 (0) | 30 (−1) | 22 (−6) | 7 (−14) | −12 (−24) | −24 (−31) | −38 (−39) |
| Average precipitation inches (mm) | 3.7 (94) | 3.3 (84) | 3.5 (89) | 3.8 (97) | 4.3 (110) | 4.5 (110) | 5.0 (130) | 4.8 (120) | 4.4 (110) | 3.1 (79) | 4.6 (120) | 5.1 (130) | 50.1 (1,273) |
| Average snowfall inches (cm) | 44.3 (113) | 27.8 (71) | 25.7 (65) | 10.8 (27) | 3.2 (8.1) | 0 (0) | 0 (0) | 0 (0) | 0 (0) | 2.1 (5.3) | 13.1 (33) | 23.1 (59) | 150.1 (381.4) |

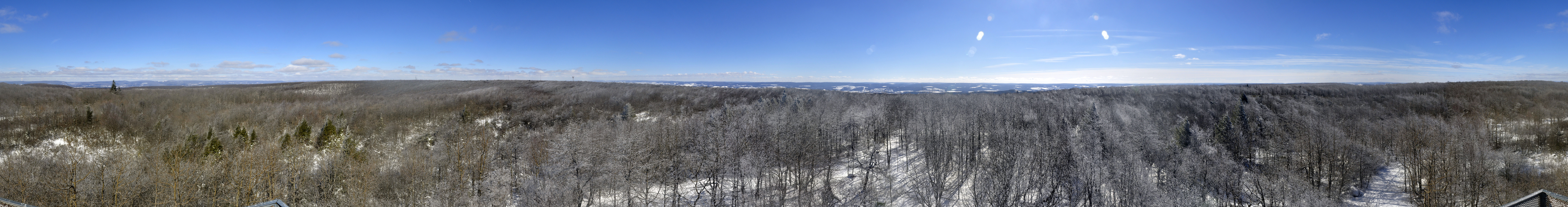
360° panoramic view from observation tower on Mount Davis, February 2016

== See also ==
- List of U.S. states by elevation
