= South Pennsylvania Railroad =

Proposed but never completed railroad in Pennsylvania

The South Pennsylvania Railroad is the name given to two proposed, but never completed, railroads in Pennsylvania during the 19th century. Parts of the right of way for the second South Pennsylvania Railroad were reused for the Pennsylvania Turnpike in 1940.

== Initial promotions ==
The first South Pennsylvania Railroad was originally chartered as the Duncannon, Landisburg, and Broad Top Railroad Company on May 5, 1854. Its intended route began in Duncannon, passed through Landisburg and Burnt Cabins and ended on the Juniata River via the Broad Top Mountain coalfields. On May 5, 1855, it was renamed the Sherman's Valley and Broad Top Railroad Company, and the planned eastern terminus was changed from Duncannon to the mouth of Fishing Creek, in Perry County near Marysville, in order to connect with the Pennsylvania Railroad. Another amendment to the charter on May 12, 1857, allowed it to connect with the Allegheny Portage Railroad and the Pittsburgh and Connellsville Railroad. Around this time, two miles of the proposed route were in fact graded. On March 31, 1859, it was given the grandiose name of Pennsylvania Pacific Railway Company, with the rights to extend into Maryland and Virginia. On April 1, 1863, it was renamed as the South Pennsylvania Railroad Company. Despite feverish promotion, including plans for 200 miles (322 km) of line from Marysville to West Newton (on the Youghiogheny River), no further work was completed. The two miles (3 km) of grading were sold off in 1872 and the charter became dormant on May 31, 1879.

== Vanderbilt syndicate ==
=== New York Central and Pennsylvania Railroad competition ===
The unused charter of the defunct South Pennsylvania Railroad was revived in the 1880s as a weapon in a growing war between the New York Central Railroad and the Pennsylvania Railroad: the two major Eastern railroad systems. William H. Vanderbilt, who controlled the New York Central, learned that the Pennsylvania had obtained control of the New York, West Shore and Buffalo Railway: a newly built railroad whose line paralleled the route of the New York Central between New York City and Buffalo. Vanderbilt viewed the West Shore project as a Pennsylvania Railroad incursion into prime New York Central territory and a threat to the Central's supremacy in the area.

To retaliate, Vanderbilt allied himself with Pittsburgh capitalists, including Andrew Carnegie and Henry Clay Frick, who were anxious to break the Pennsylvania Railroad's freight monopoly in Pittsburgh and western Pennsylvania. Vanderbilt, the Pittsburghers and other investors formed a syndicate to finance and build a new mainline railroad across the Alleghenies that would connect Pittsburgh with Harrisburg, and, working jointly with the Philadelphia and Reading Railway, would form a route to the East Coast. The group used the long-inactive charter of the South Pennsylvania Railroad as its vehicle to begin constructing the railroad.

=== The route ===
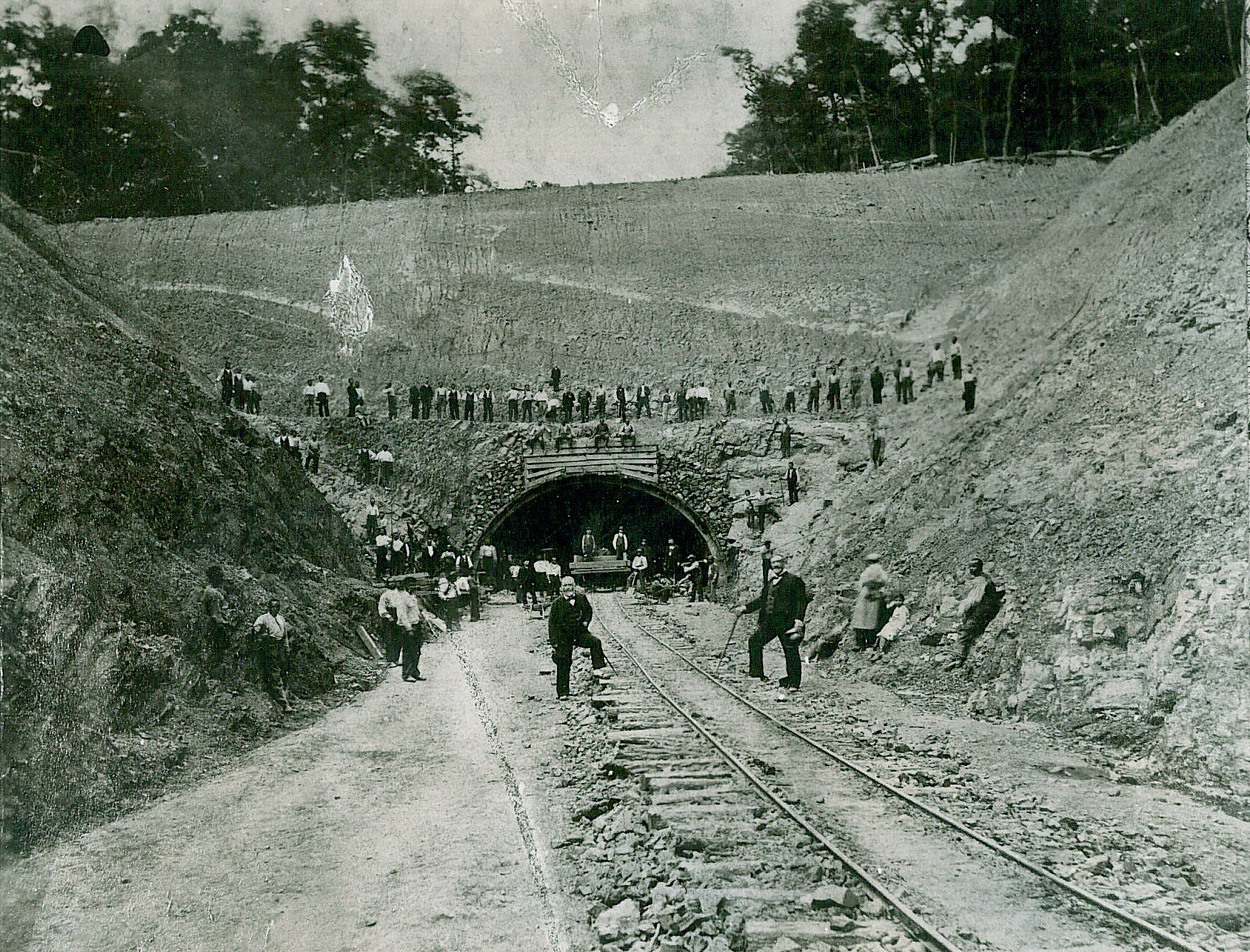
Rays Hill Tunnel during construction of the railroad tunnel in the 1880s. Andrew Carnegie is present in the middle of the image. The tunnel was later used by the Turnpike until bypassed in 1968.

The new route for the railroad was surveyed beginning in 1881, and construction began soon after. The alignment, which had first been surveyed in the 1840s by Colonel Charles Schattler of the U.S. Army Corps of Engineers and then dismissed as a possible route for the Pennsylvania, crossed the spine of the Appalachians in southern Pennsylvania. It connected Harrisburg with the Pittsburgh and Lake Erie Railroad, a Vanderbilt subsidiary, at Port Perry.

The so-called "southern route" of the South Pennsylvania was a treacherous one, as it crossed six mountain ridges, required nine tunnels and involved numerous curves and steep grades. Construction continued into 1885, with considerable work done in drilling the tunnels and grading the portion of the route through the mountains. But, as expenses rose, Vanderbilt began to have second thoughts and began looking for a graceful way out that would protect the investments made by his syndicate partners. He proposed a truce and buyout by the Pennsylvania, but the Pennsylvania's president, George Roberts, refused to meet his price.

=== Cessation of work ===
Banker J. P. Morgan, who was the New York Central's principal banker and a Vanderbilt ally, was also concerned about the financial effects of ruthless competition. He brokered an agreement in which the New York Central bought the West Shore Railroad, halted construction on the South Pennsylvania (including a bridge over the Susquehanna River at Harrisburg) and agreed to sell its right-of-way to the Pennsylvania. However, legal action prevented the Pennsylvania from taking control of the line, and the South Pennsylvania remained in limbo for almost 20 years. In the meantime, two short sections, including the Quemahoning Tunnel, were later used for local short line railroads (the Pittsburgh, Westmoreland and Somerset Railroad among them), but the majority of the line, including several unfinished tunnels, remained unused. It eventually came to be known as "Vanderbilt's Folly".

In 1893, the Southern Pennsylvania Railway, a Pennsylvania Railroad subsidiary which had charter rights along the route, initiated court proceedings to take ownership of part of the South Pennsylvania grade. In 1895, it obtained title to the grade east of Mount Dallas. A little surveying and repair work was done on the route that year, but it was never used, and the grade was sold to the Pennsylvania Turnpike Commission in 1938.

In 1904, the Baltimore and Ohio Railroad bought the South Pennsylvania grade west of Mount Dallas, organizing it under the name of Fulton, Bedford and Somerset Railroad. No railroad was ever built on the right-of-way, and it was also sold to the Turnpike Commission.

Pittsburgh was originally a branch line until Carnegie and others intervened and persuaded Vanderbilt to discard the original alignment, which was to go to Wheeling via Connellsville and Brownsville. Maps, letters and other documents including tunnel designs are open to the public in the state archives in Harrisburg.

== Pennsylvania Turnpike ==
The route was revived during the Great Depression, when plans were made to build a superhighway across Pennsylvania. In 1937, the new Pennsylvania Turnpike Commission bought the old line from the two railroads and, in 1938, construction began between Carlisle and Irwin. Two of the workers from the South Pennsylvania Railroad project (one contractor and one laborer) also worked on the Turnpike despite the 54-year time difference in construction.

The turnpike's original route was opened in October 1940, using six of the railroad's nine tunnels (subsequent route re-alignments have caused some of these tunnels to be abandoned), while the original Allegheny Mountain Tunnel wasn't used due to structural concerns and the Quemahoning Tunnel and Negro Mountain Tunnel were bypassed because advances in engineering since the 1880s allowed for bypasses. The highway engineers did not use most of the railroad's other grading, however, since they could afford steeper grades and shorter alignments. Because of this, relics of the "ghost railroad" may still be found all across the Alleghenies.

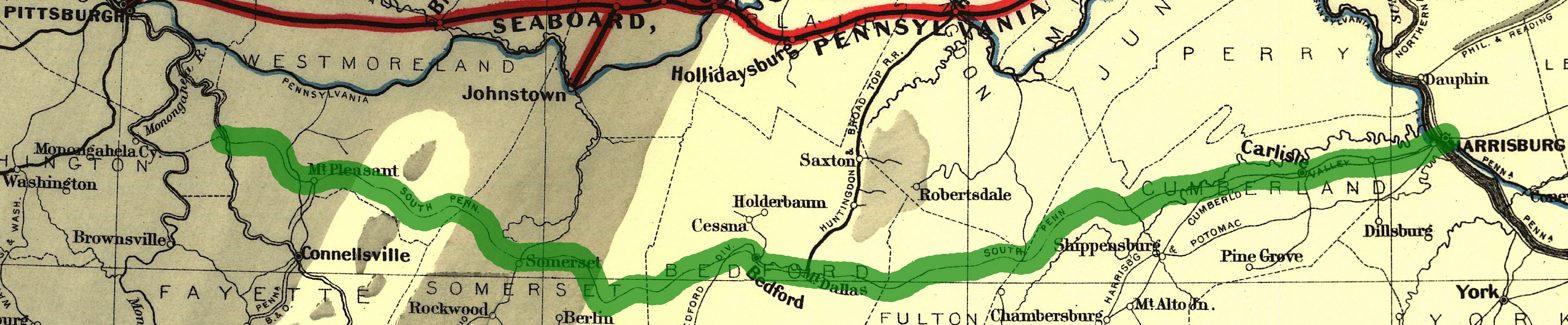
The South Pennsylvania Railroad was planned to connect Pittsburgh with Harrisburg.
