= Ligonier Valley Railroad =

Overview
- Headquarters: Ligonier, Pennsylvania
- Reporting mark: LGV
- Locale: Westmoreland County, Pennsylvania
- Dates of operation: 1877–1952
- Successor: None except for 3 miles (5 km) used by the Pennsylvania Railroad, which was later abandoned

Technical
- Track gauge: 4 ft 8 1/2 in (1,435 mm) standard gauge
- Previous gauge: originally 3 ft (914 mm) gauge
- Length: 15.9 miles (25.6 km)

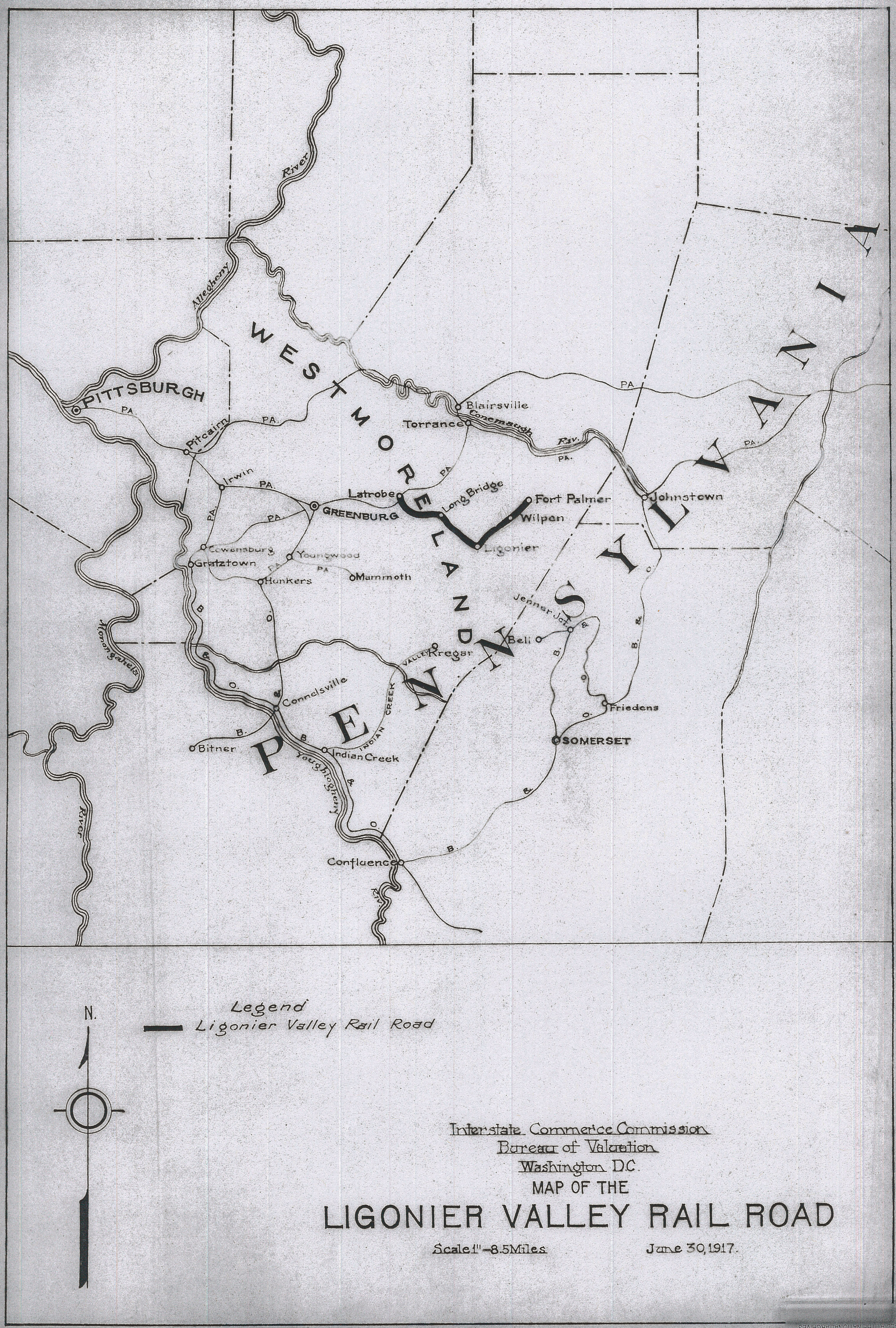
1917 map of the railroad

The Ligonier Valley Railroad (reporting mark LGV) connected the communities of Latrobe and Ligonier, Pennsylvania, approximately 10 miles (16 km) apart, between 1877 and 1952. For much of its length, the railroad ran parallel to Loyalhanna Creek in a scenic mountain gorge. In addition to the Latrobe-Ligonier line, there was an extension to the coal mining communities of Wilpen and Fort Palmer to the north of Ligonier, as well as several shorter spurs serving coal mines.

The railroad was owned and operated by the Mellon family of banking fame. Freight included coal, coke, lumber, and quarry stone.

== History ==
The history of the railroad can be traced back to 1853, when the Pennsylvania General Assembly passed the “Act of Incorporation for the Latrobe and Ligonier Rail Road Company.” The name was changed to the Ligonier Valley Rail Road Company in May 1871. Grading and construction were very slow owing to financial problems, and in August 1877 Thomas Mellon, a Pittsburgh banking magnate, agreed to purchase the line. Service finally began on December 1, 1877.

The railroad was originally 3 ft (914 mm) narrow gauge, but was converted to 4 ft 8 1/2 in (1,435 mm) standard gauge in 1882.

Another segment of the railroad has its roots in a 1903 venture known as the Westmoreland Central Railroad. This company proposed to build a railroad connecting Ligonier to Bolivar, where it would connect with the main line of the Pennsylvania Railroad. In 1904, the Ligonier Valley Railroad purchased the partly constructed line. In 1908, this was opened as the Ligonier-Wilpen-Fort Palmer branch and was 5.7 miles (9.2 km) in length. The segment that would have linked Bolivar was never constructed, leaving the coal mining community of Fort Palmer as the northernmost extent of the Ligonier Valley Railroad.

A new headquarters building including station facilities was built 1909-1910 in Ligonier and is still standing.

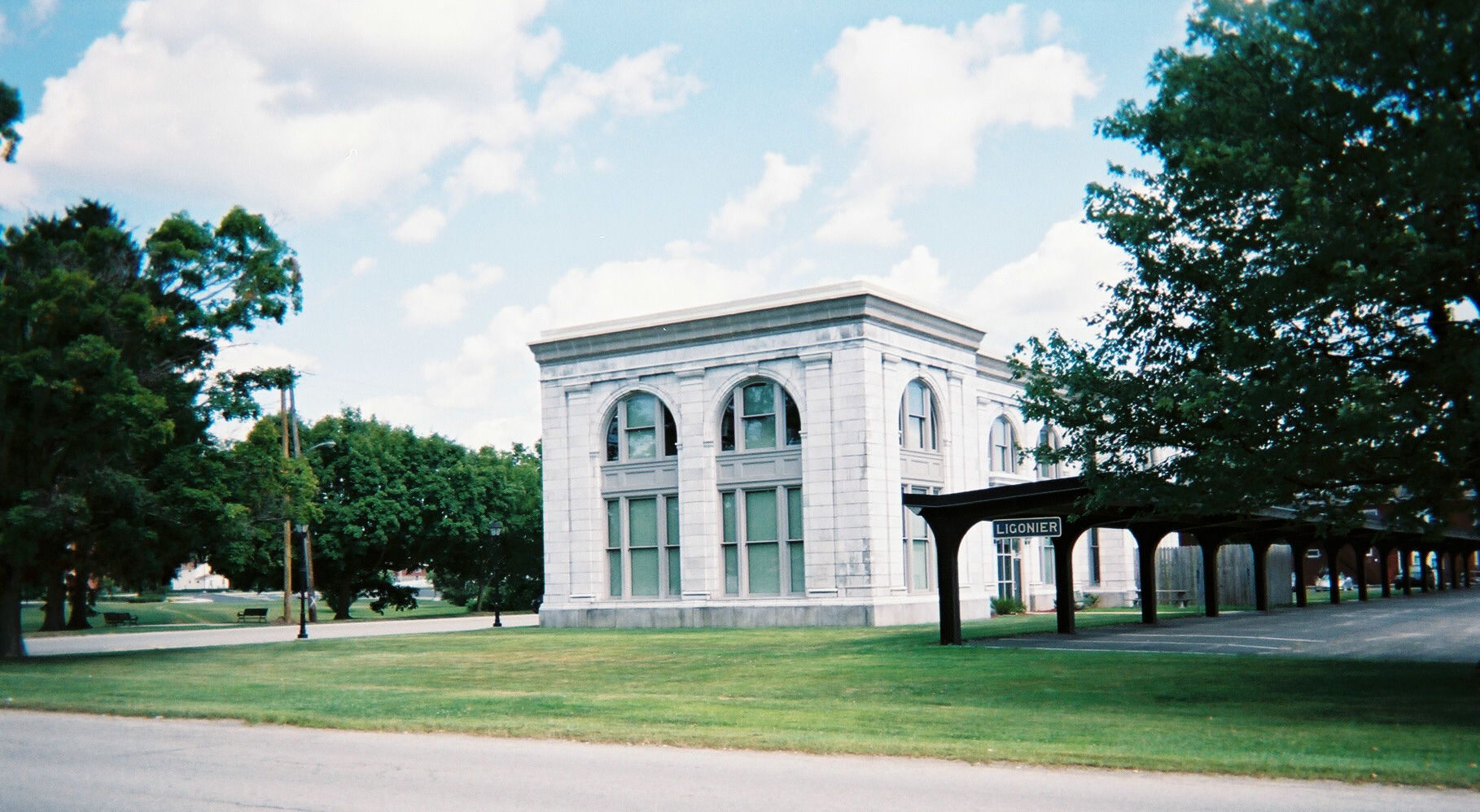
Former depot and headquarters in Ligonier

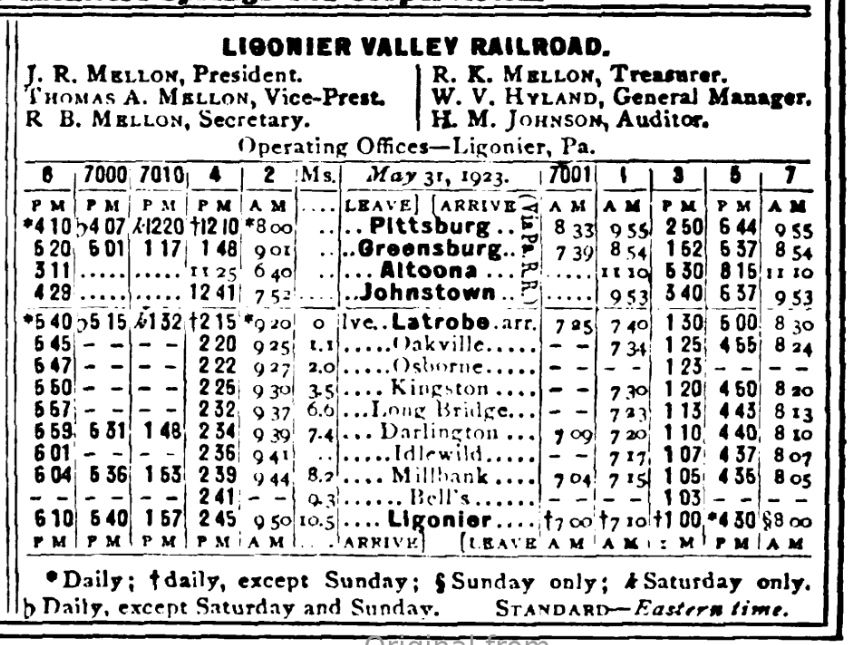
1923 Timetable

== Passenger service ==
Passenger service was available between Latrobe and Ligonier up to the cessation of service in 1952. Stations in order from west to east were as follows. Distances shown are measured from Latrobe:

- Latrobe (0 miles): Connection with Pennsylvania Railroad
- Oakville (1.5 mi or 2.4 km)
- Osburn (2.1 mi or 3.4 km)
- Kingston (3.2 mi or 5.1 km)
- Long Bridge, Pennsylvania (6.5 mi or 10.5 km)
- Idlewild (originally Idle Wild): Served the railroad-owned Idlewild Park, an amusement park.
- Darlington (7.4 mi or 11.9 km)
- Milbank (8.2 mi or 13.2 km) (originally Coal Pit)
- Bells (9.1 mi or 14.6 km)
- Ligonier (10.2 mi or 16.4 km): Headquarters, with connection to Pittsburgh, Westmoreland and Somerset Railroad. The old depot and headquarters building now serves as offices for the Ligonier Valley School District.
- North Ligonier (on the Ligonier-Wilpen-Fort Palmer extension)
- Hannah's Run (on the Ligonier-Wilpen-Fort Palmer extension)
- Wilpen (on the Ligonier-Wilpen-Fort Palmer extension)

Some sources show slightly different mileages. For example, a 1941 timetable shows Ligonier as 10.5 miles (16.9 km) from Latrobe.

Passenger service was quite frequent, considering the small populations of the communities along the line. The railroad-owned Idlewild Park was a substantial draw for passenger traffic, reflected in the fact that extra passenger trains were run on Sundays.

In 1941, there were five trains per day in each direction between Latrobe and Ligonier. Four of the five stopped at all stations, while one train per day served only Latrobe, Kingston, Darlington, and Ligonier. In addition, three extra trains ran Sunday only, and yet another train ran daily except Saturday.

The 1941 timetable shows no passenger service on the Wilpen branch. However, the June 1916 edition of the Official Guide of the Railways and Steam Navigation Lines of the United States shows two trains per day in each direction serving (in order from south to north) Ligonier, North Ligonier, Hannah's Run, and Wilpen.

== 1912 Wilpen disaster ==
The worst disaster on the Ligonier Valley occurred at 3:40 PM (EST) on Friday, July 5, 1912, 2 miles (3.2 km) from Ligonier, on the Wilpen branch near the Wilpen Fair Grounds. A locomotive pushing a single wooden coach, northbound, collided head-on with a southbound freight train locomotive on a curve. The passenger coach, crowded with revelers returning from a holiday celebration, absorbed the brunt of the impact. In total, 26 people died and 29 were injured, including many children. The railroad relied on verbal orders to train crews, without signals, written orders, or written rules. According to the resulting investigation by the Interstate Commerce Commission, the dispatcher and passenger train conductor disputed whether a verbal order had been issued to wait for the passage of the freight train. Investigators were shocked that the railroad had been relying solely on oral instructions to avoid collisions.

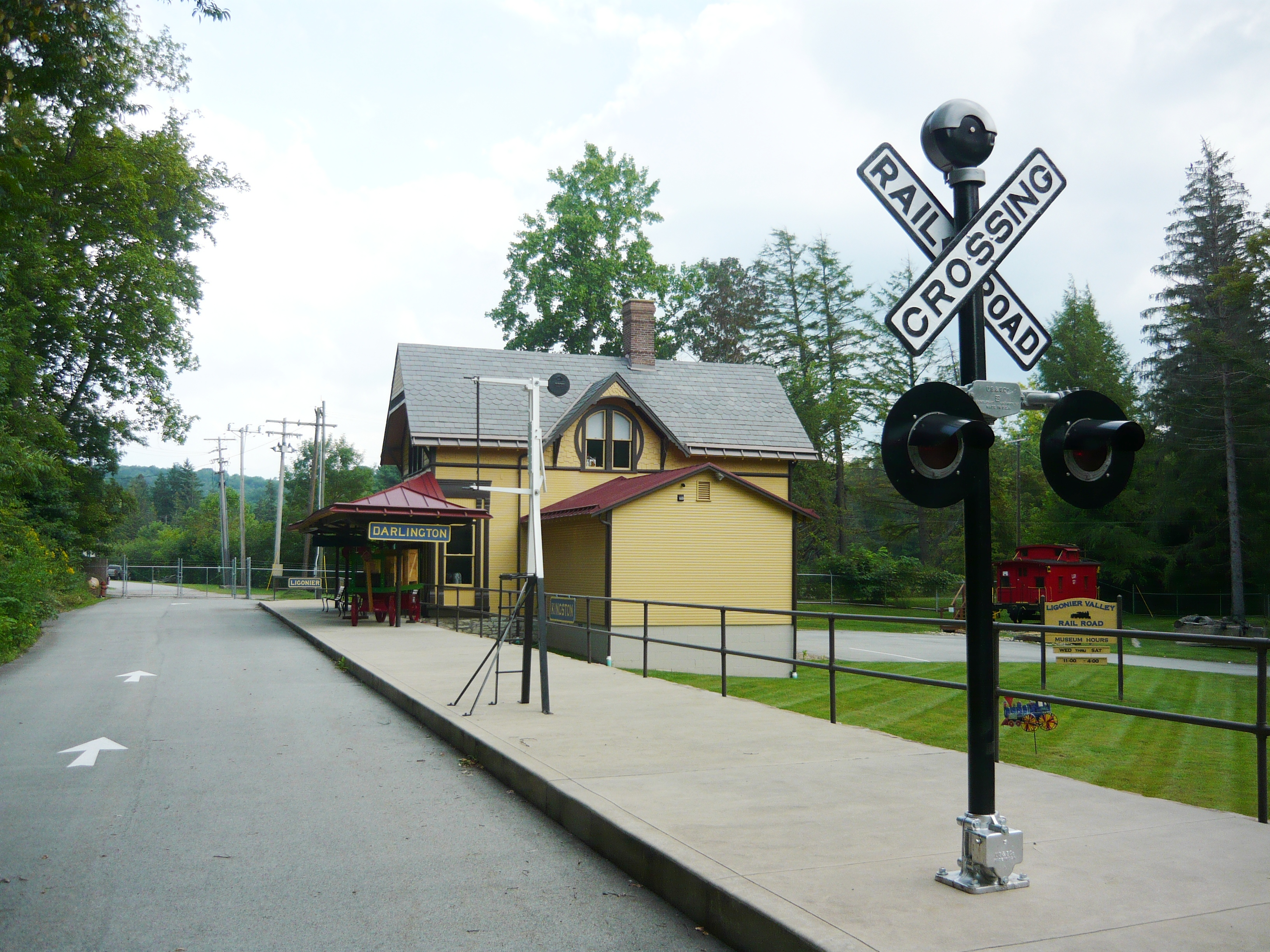
Darlington Station, home to the LVR Museum.

[Some sources between 23 and 26 died]

== Closure ==
Both freight and passenger service ended on August 31, 1952, except for the 3.5-mile (5.6 km) Latrobe-Kingston segment which was operated by the Pennsylvania Railroad as an industrial spur. It has since been abandoned.

Much of the railroad's right-of-way is occupied by the westbound lanes of U.S. Route 30, parallel to Loyalhanna Creek. Some of the stations are still standing, including those at Oakville and Ligonier. Both Idlewild stations (the original 1878 building and the replacement 1931 structure) stand within the park and function as park buildings. The Darlington station is also located on park property and was given to the Ligonier Valley Rail Road Association by the park, has been restored, and is home to the association's museum.

== See also ==
- Idlewild Park
- Ligonier, Pennsylvania
- Pittsburgh, Westmoreland and Somerset Railroad
