= Springs, Pennsylvania =

Unincorporated community in Pennsylvania, US

Coordinates: 39°44′01″N 79°08′57″W

Springs is an unincorporated community in Elk Lick Township, Somerset County, Pennsylvania, United States. It has a large Amish and Mennonite population.

Location of Springs on a map.

== Recreation ==
The Springs Folk Festival is a two-day long festival that takes place annually on October. It gathers nearly 10,000 visitors every year. It has been in operation since the 1950s. There is also a farmers' market that takes place every Saturday from May to September. The Springs Museum showcases artifacts from the 18th century u to the 1980s.
