= Elk Lick Township, Pennsylvania =

Township in Pennsylvania, US

Coordinates: 39°44′00″N 79°09′59″W

Elk Lick Township, Somerset County, Pennsylvania
- Township
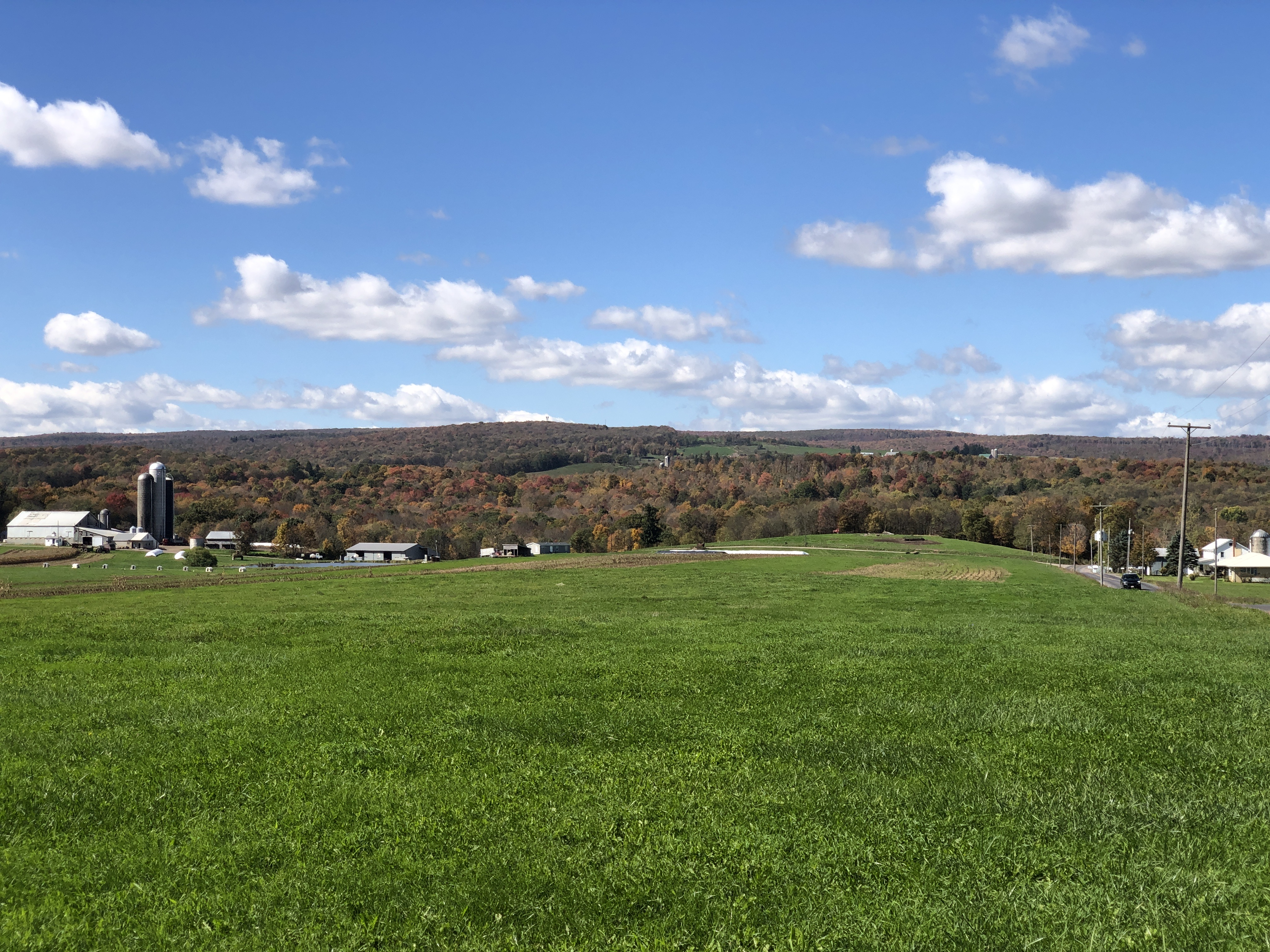
- View of farms in the township, with Mount Davis in the distance

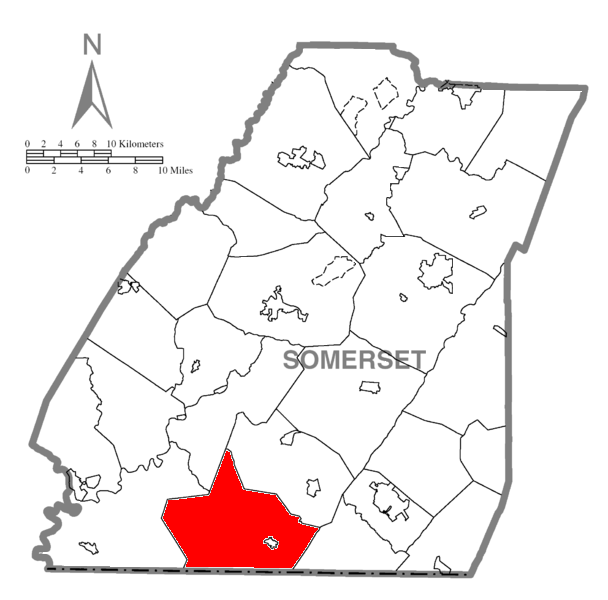
- Map of Somerset County, Pennsylvania Highlighting Elk Lick Township

- Map of Somerset County, Pennsylvania
- Country: United States
- State: Pennsylvania
- County: Somerset

Area
  - Total: 57.65 sq mi (149.32 km^{2})
  - Land: 57.06 sq mi (147.79 km^{2})
  - Water: 0.59 sq mi (1.53 km^{2})

Population (2020)
  - Total: 2,264 ▲
  - Estimate (2022): 2,245
  - Density: 37.6/sq mi (14.53/km^{2})
- Time zone: UTC-5 (Eastern (EST))
  - Summer (DST): UTC-4 (EDT)
- FIPS code: 42-111-23168

Elk Lick Township is a township in Somerset County, Pennsylvania, United States. The population was 2,264 at the 2020 census. Mount Davis, the highest point in Pennsylvania, is located within the township.

== History ==
Elk Lick Township was formed around 1785, while the areas was still a part of Bedford County. Joseph Markley was one of the first settlers, around 1760. The first church was built in 1813 by local Reformed and Lutheran congregations.

== Geography ==
According to the United States Census Bureau, Elk Lick Township has a total area of 57.5 square miles (149 km^{2}), of which 56.9 square miles (147 km^{2}) is land and 0.6 square miles (1.6 km^{2}) (1.01%) is water. It surrounds the borough of Salisbury, which is located in the southeastern section of the township. Elk Lick Township is bordered by Greenville Township to the east, Summit Township to the northeast, Black Township to the northwest, Addison Township to the west, and the state of Maryland to the south. Forbes State Forest, Mount Davis, High Point Lake, and Deer Valley Lake (Pittsburgh YMCA Lake) are all located in the western sections of the township. U.S. Route 219 passes through the eastern part of the township, heading north from Maryland, passing through the borough of Salisbury, and continuing northeast into Summit Township.

== Demographics ==
Historical population
Census	Pop.	Note	%±
2010	2,241		—
2020	2,264		1.0%
2022 (est.)	2,245		−0.8%
U.S. Decennial Census

At the 2000 census there were 2,293 people, 802 households, and 639 families in the township. The population density was 40.3 inhabitants per square mile (15.6/km^{2}). There were 919 housing units at an average density of 16.1/sq mi (6.2/km^{2}). The racial makeup of the township was 99.39% White, 0.09% Pacific Islander, 0.17% from other races, and 0.35% from two or more races. Hispanic or Latino of any race were 0.65%.

Of the 802 households 33.3% had children under the age of 18 living with them, 68.0% were married couples living together, 8.4% had a female householder with no husband present, and 20.3% were non-families. 17.7% of households were one person and 10.7% were one person aged 65 or older. The average household size was 2.86 and the average family size was 3.21.

The age distribution was 26.8% under the age of 18, 8.8% from 18 to 24, 27.2% from 25 to 44, 20.6% from 45 to 64, and 16.6% 65 or older. The median age was 36 years. For every 100 females there were 97.7 males. For every 100 females age 18 and over, there were 95.7 males.

The median household income was $30,833 and the median family income was $36,111. Males had a median income of $24,732 versus $18,160 for females. The per capita income for the township was $14,176. About 10.9% of families and 13.9% of the population were below the poverty line, including 20.4% of those under age 18 and 9.8% of those age 65 or over.
