= Forbes State Forest =

State forest in Pennsylvania, United States

- IUCN category VI (protected area with sustainable use of natural resources)
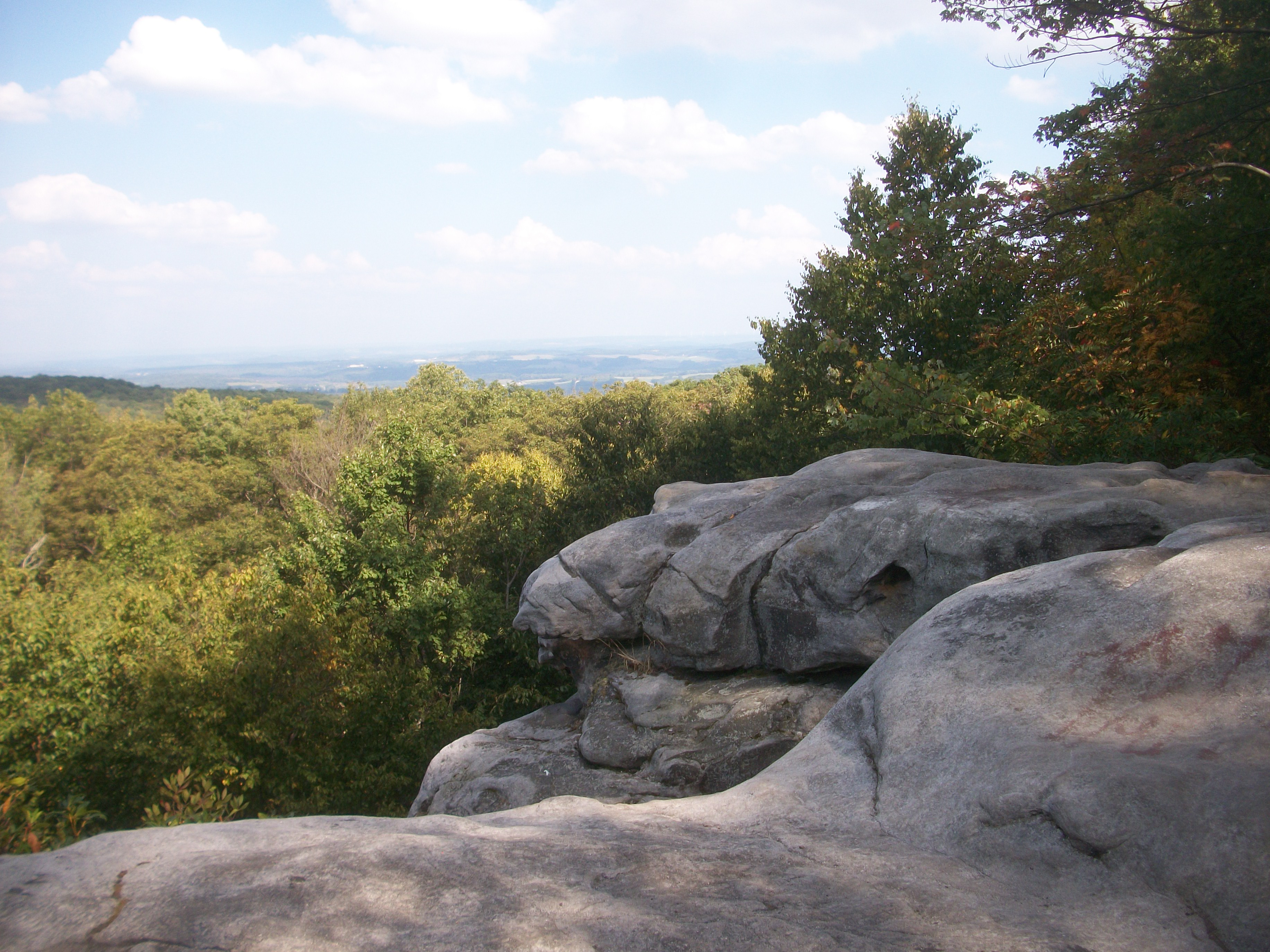
- View of the surrounding forest from the Beam Rocks overlook.

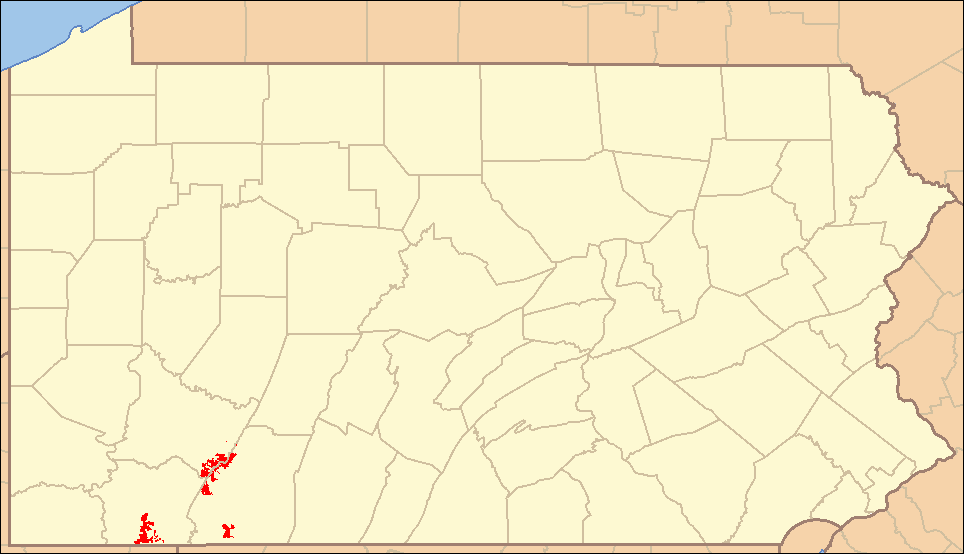
- Location of Forbes State Forest in Pennsylvania
- Location: Pennsylvania, United States
- Coordinates: 40°12′43″N 79°11′52″W
- Area: 60,000 acres (240 km^{2})
- Elevation: 2,717 ft (828 m)
- Established: 1909
- Governing body: Pennsylvania Department of Conservation and Natural Resources
- Website: Forbes State Forest

Forbes State Forest is a Pennsylvania state forest in Pennsylvania Bureau of Forestry District #4. The main offices are located in Laughlintown in Westmoreland County, Pennsylvania in the United States. Mount Davis, the highest peak in Pennsylvania, is located in the forest.

The forest was named in honor of General John Forbes. It includes 20 separate tracts of land and covers over 50,000 acres (20,230 ha) that stretch across Fayette, Somerset, and Westmoreland Counties. The designated forest tracts generally follow one of the area's dominant terrain features, Laurel Ridge, part of the Laurel Highlands.

== History ==
Forbes State Forest was formed as a direct result of the depletion of the forests of Pennsylvania that took place during the mid-to-late 19th century. Conservationists like Dr. Joseph Rothrock became concerned that the forests would not regrow if they were not managed properly. Lumber and iron companies had harvested the old-growth forests for various reasons. They clear cut the forests and left behind nothing but dried tree tops and rotting stumps. The sparks of passing steam locomotives of the Pittsburgh, Westmoreland and Somerset Railroad ignited wildfires that prevented the formation of second growth forests. Conservationists feared that the forest would never regrow if there was not a change in the philosophy of forest management. They called for the state to purchase land from the lumber and iron companies.

Changes began in 1895 when Dr. Rothrock was appointed the first commissioner of the Pennsylvania Department of Forests and Waters, the forerunner of today's Pennsylvania Department of Conservation and Natural Resources. The Pennsylvania General Assembly passed a piece of legislation in 1897 that authorized the purchase of "unseated lands for forest reservations". This was the beginning of the State Forest system.

In 1909, the Commonwealth made its first purchase of land that would become Forbes State Forest from the Byers & Allen Lumber Company, totaling 8,532 acres. This land was initially known as the Westmoreland-Somerset Forest Reserve, but renamed the Stuart Forest Reserve in 1910 after Edwin S. Stuart, then-governor of Pennsylvania. In 1920, the land was renamed Forbes State Forest after General John Forbes. Throughout the 20th and early 21st centuries, additional tracts have expanded Forbes State Forest to about 60,000 acres. Some of the notable land acquisitions include 4,697 acres containing Mount Davis in 1929; 2,351 acres from the Indian Creek Coal & Coke Company in 1949, referred to as the Braddock Division; and 10,775 acres from the Western Pennsylvania Conservancy in 1975, which contained 3,593 acres that would become Roaring Run Natural Area.

In 1933, the Civilian Conservation Corps set up camps at Negro Mountain, Fort Necessity, Blue Hole, and Kooser in Forbes State Forest.

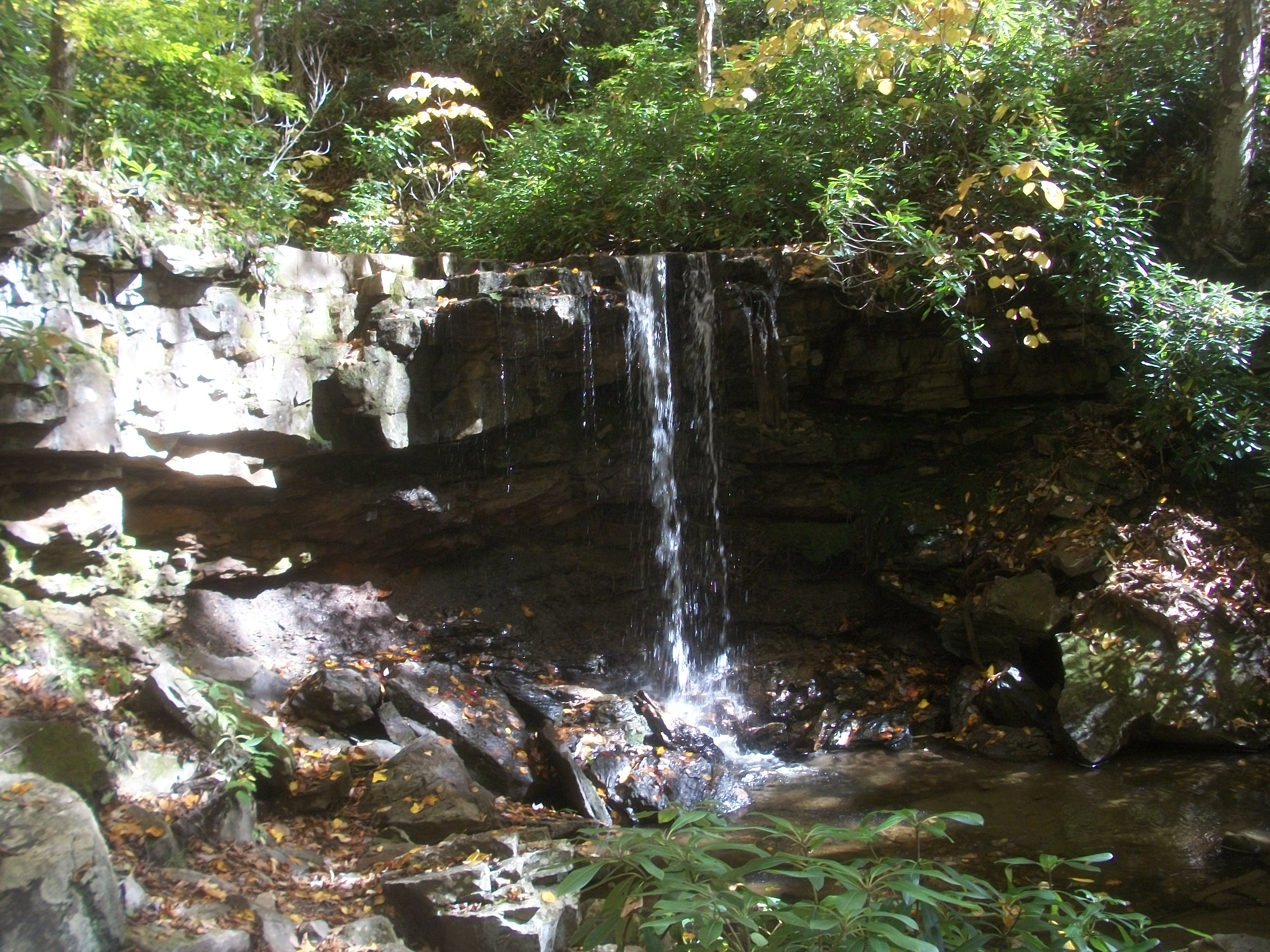
Cole Run Falls is located in an isolated unit of the reserve.

== Facilities ==
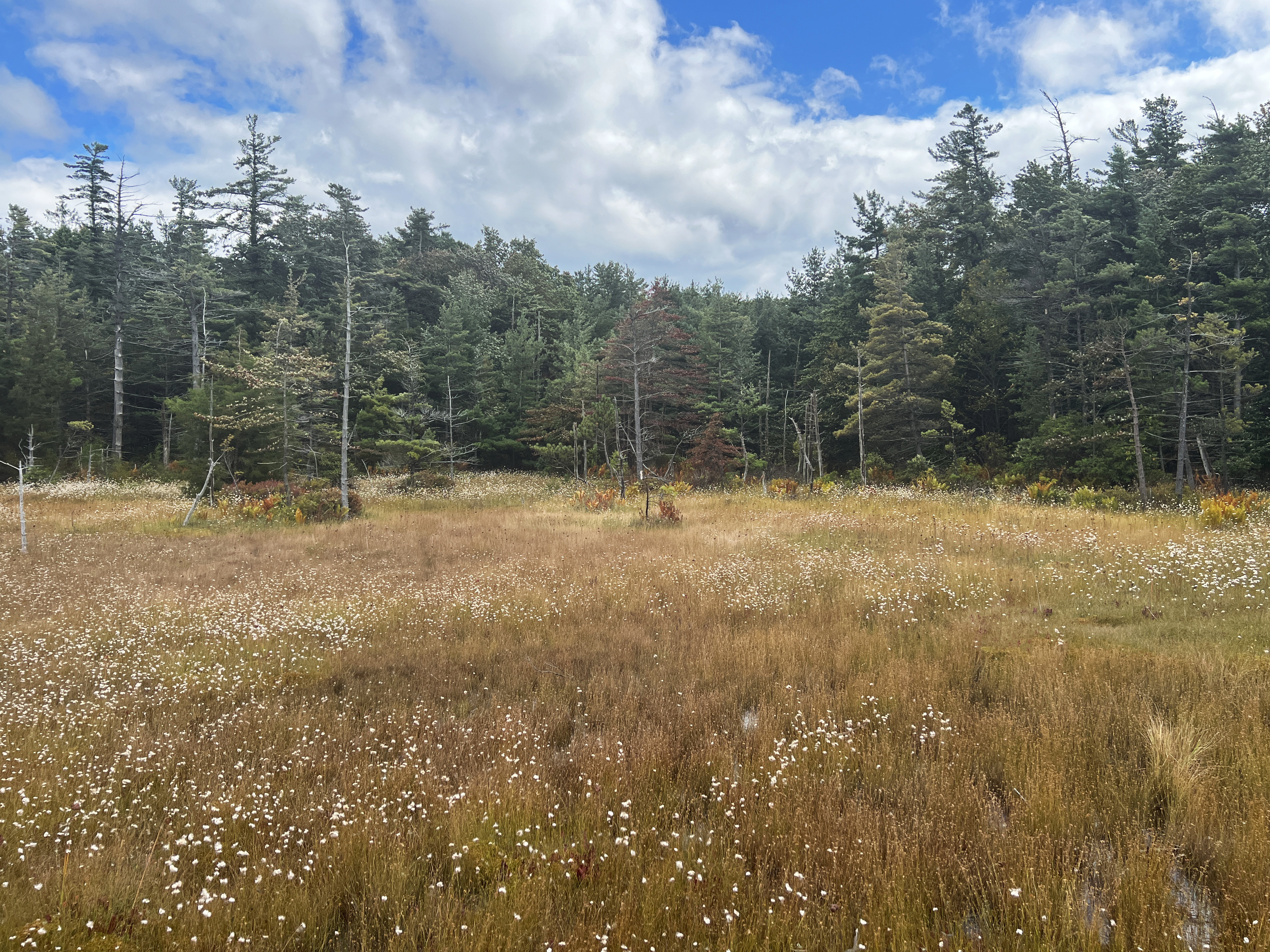
Spruce Flats Bog is reached via a short trail from adjacent Laurel Summit State Park.

In order to accommodate visitors, the state has allowed the development of 9 areas within Forbes. This includes 6 State Parks and 3 State Forest Picnic Areas. The remainder of the area is undeveloped except for hiking trails maintained by the state. These are generally closed to vehicles but open to hiking, cross-country skiing, hunting, and fishing. Several portions of what is now designated as part of the Forbes State Forest had previously been either developed or commercially exploited through logging through the early-to-mid-20th century. These areas have been allowed, and sometimes encouraged, to return to their natural state.

== Neighboring state forest districts ==
The U.S. states of Maryland and West Virginia are to the south and west, respectively

- Clear Creek State Forest (north)
- Gallitzin State Forest (northeast)
- Buchanan State Forest (east)

== Nearby state parks ==
- Kooser State Park
- Laurel Hill State Park
- Laurel Mountain State Park
- Laurel Ridge State Park
- Laurel Summit State Park
- Linn Run State Park
- Ohiopyle State Park

== Natural features ==
Forbes State Forest lies within the Appalachian mixed mesophytic forests ecoregion. It also includes a number of important natural features and points of interest:

Roaring Run Natural Area, at 3,070 acres (1,242 ha), was acquired by the State of Pennsylvania in 1975. After previous development and logging, this portion of the west slope of Laurel Ridge is currently undergoing reforestation. It is compromised largely of second and third growth mixed mesophytic forest. Roaring Run feeds into Indian Creek, which is a tributary of the Youghiogheny River. The state forest also includes Quebec Run Wild Area.

Mount Davis is the highest point in Pennsylvania and is found within the state forest. The high point is protected within Mount Davis Natural Area. The area eventually drains into the Casselman River, a part of the Mississippi River watershed (via the Youghiogheny, Monongahela, and Ohio Rivers). One of the natural attractions of the area is the presence of small concentric stone rings which result from frost heaving in small patches of earth which are softer than the ground surrounding them. Frost causing the patches to be pushed up higher than their surroundings is followed by the effects of natural erosion which results in stones sliding to the bottom of the protrusion and forming ring-like patterns at the base.

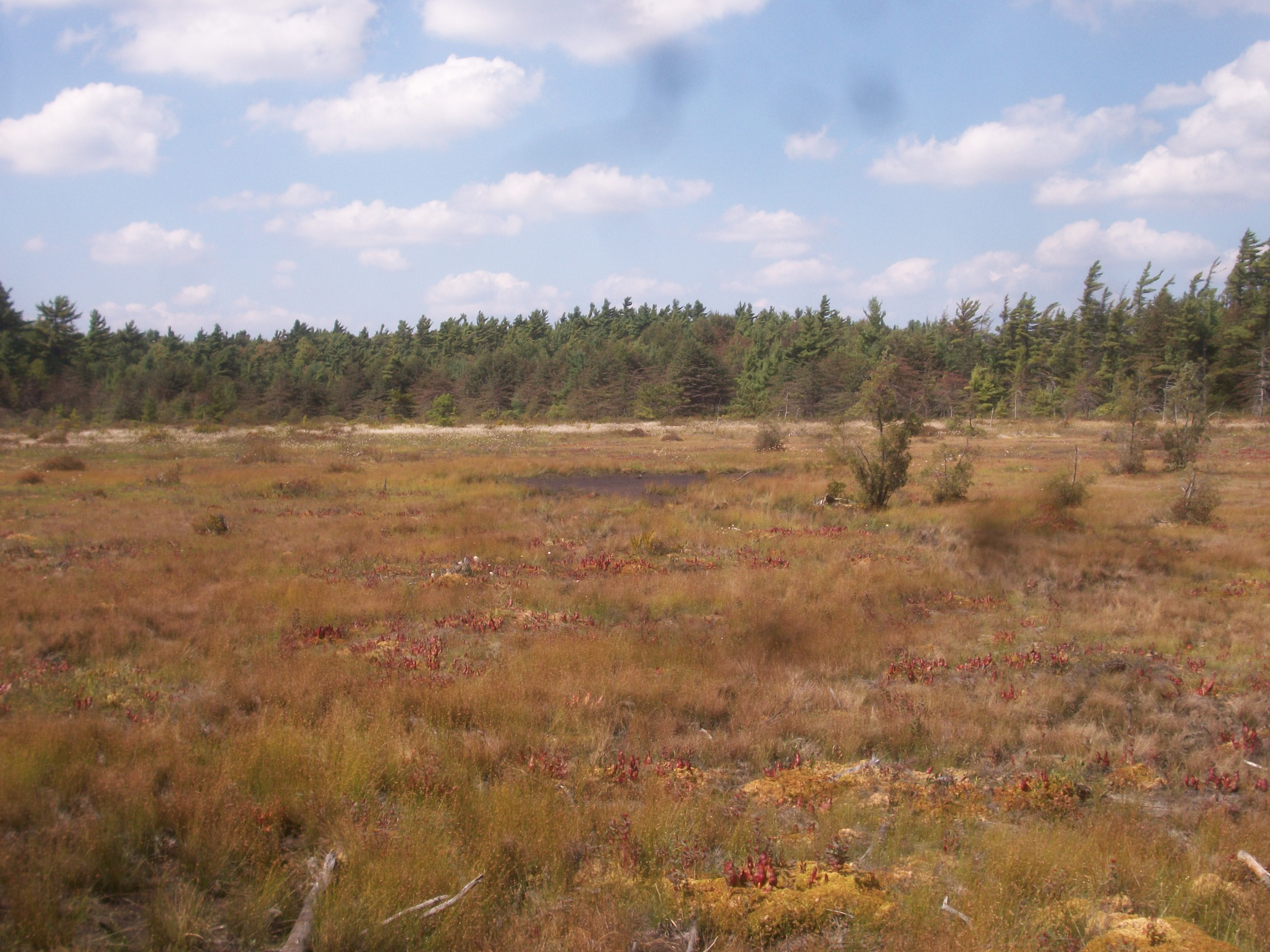
Spruce Flats Bog, which was formed in 1908 after the area was deforested and a subsequent fire altered the composition of the soil.

Spruce Flats Wildlife Management Area covers 305 acres (123 ha), with a focal point on the 28 acres (11 ha) of the Spruce Flats Bog which formed in a natural depression atop Laurel Ridge. The area had previously passed through the successional sequence from open water to (eventually) forest. This process was actually reversed in the early part of the 20th century by a combination of clear-cutting the forest, and fires which burned away much of the forest floor. This resulted in a return to the swamp or bog stage of development, and the area is now slowly proceeding back into the forest stage. The bog currently hosts a large community of cranberry, pitcher plant, sundew, and cotton grass.
