= Salisbury, Pennsylvania =

Borough in Pennsylvania, US

- Borough
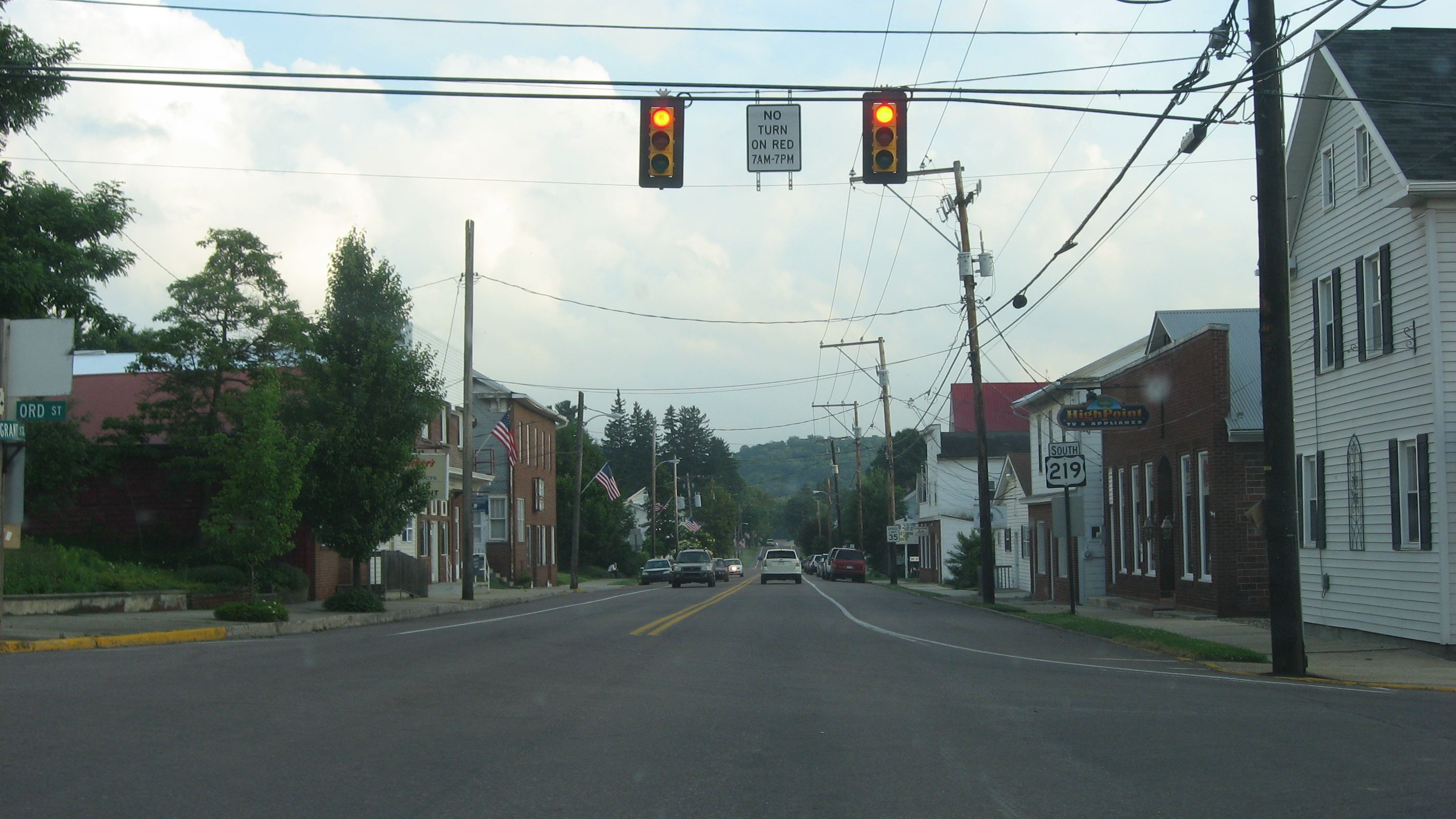
- Grant Street, downtown

- Location of Salisbury in Somerset County, Pennsylvania.

- Location within Pennsylvania Location within the United States
- Coordinates: 39°49′05″N 79°04′59″W
- Country: United States
- State: Pennsylvania
- County: Somerset
- Settled: 1794
- Incorporated: 1862

Government
  - Type: Borough Council

Area
  - Total: 0.38 sq mi (0.99 km^{2})
  - Land: 0.38 sq mi (0.99 km^{2})
  - Water: 0 sq mi (0.00 km^{2})
- Elevation: 2,114 ft (644 m)

Population (2020)
  - Total: 706
  - Density: 1,841.3/sq mi (710.93/km^{2})
- Time zone: UTC-5 (Eastern (EST))
  - Summer (DST): UTC-4 (EDT)
- Zip code: 15558
- Area code: 814
- FIPS code: 42-67584

Salisbury is a borough in Somerset County, Pennsylvania, United States. The population was 707 at the 2020 census. It is part of the Johnstown, Pennsylvania, Metropolitan Statistical Area.

== History ==
Salisbury was laid out by Joseph Markley in 1794, with Douglas Baker as the surveyor. Peter Shirer and Martin Weimer built the first house, and Peter Shirer was also the first storekeeper. Peter Shirer and Peter Welfley added more lots to the town circa 1814, John Smith added more in about 1850, and the Beachy family added still more in 1870. The town, located on the Turkey Foot Road, was organized as a borough in 1862.

In 1998, Salisbury was hit by two F3 tornadoes on May 31 and June 2. The May 31 tornado killed one person and injured 15 others and the June 2 tornado intensified into an F4 tornado when it struck Allegany County, Maryland.

== Geography ==
Salisbury is located at 39°45′5″N 79°4′59″W (39.751455, -79.083076). According to the United States Census Bureau, the borough has a total area of 0.4 square miles (1.0 km^{2}), all land. It is surrounded by Elk Lick Township.

== Demographics ==
Historical population
Census	Pop.	Note	%±
1870	291		—
1880	521		79.0%
1890	689		32.2%
1900	980		42.2%
1910	885		−9.7%
1920	951		7.5%
1930	710		−25.3%
1940	919		29.4%
1950	865		−5.9%
1960	862		−0.3%
1970	895		3.8%
1980	817		−8.7%
1990	716		−12.4%
2000	878		22.6%
2010	727		−17.2%
2020	706		−2.9%
2021 (est.)	700	▼	−0.8%
U.S. Decennial Census

As of the census of 2000, there were 878 people, 350 households, and 218 families residing in the borough. The population density was 2,203.6 inhabitants per square mile (850.8/km^{2}). There were 368 housing units at an average density of 923.6 per square mile (356.6/km^{2}). The racial makeup of the borough was 99.66% White, and 0.34% from two or more races. Hispanic or Latino of any race were 0.80% of the population.

There were 350 households, out of which 26.0% had children under the age of 18 living with them, 49.7% were married couples living together, 8.6% had a female householder with no husband present, and 37.7% were non-families. 33.7% of all households were made up of individuals, and 21.1% had someone living alone who was 65 years of age or older. The average household size was 2.44 and the average family size was 3.07.

In the borough the population was spread out, with 23.6% under the age of 18, 5.8% from 18 to 24, 25.9% from 25 to 44, 23.0% from 45 to 64, and 21.8% who were 65 years of age or older. The median age was 41 years. For every 100 females there were 89.6 males. For every 100 females age 18 and over, there were 83.8 males.

The median income for a household in the borough was $26,875, and the median income for a family was $36,188. Males had a median income of $30,682 versus $17,222 for females. The per capita income for the borough was $12,973. About 10.6% of families and 18.3% of the population were below the poverty line, including 21.7% of those under age 18 and 14.1% of those age 65 or over.
