= Stahlstown, Pennsylvania =

Unincorporated community in Pennsylvania, US

Stahlstown
- Unincorporated community
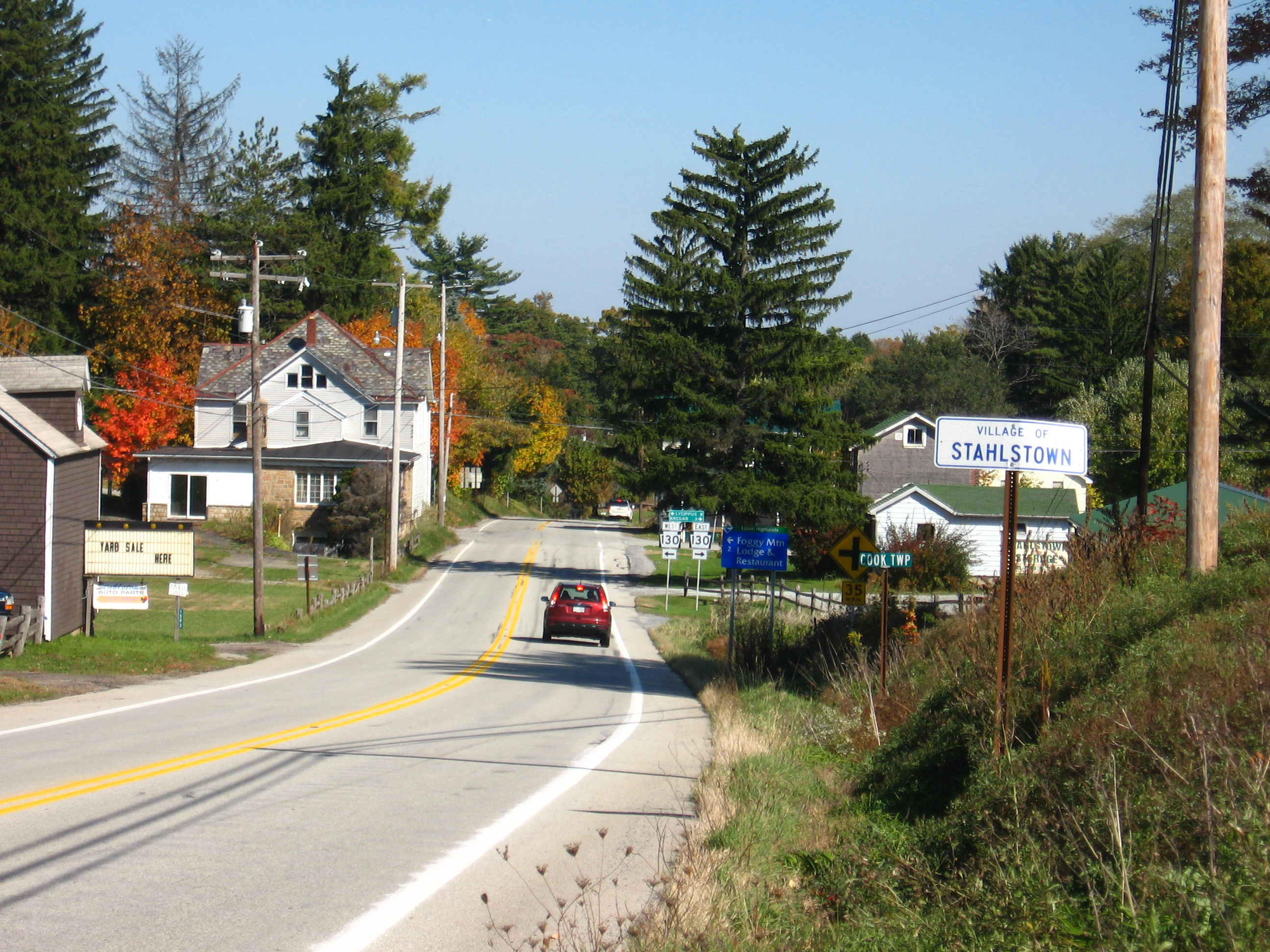
- Near the intersection of Pennsylvania Routes 130 and 711

- Location within the U.S. state of Pennsylvania Stahlstown (the United States)
- Coordinates: 40°09′06″N 79°19′54″W
- Country: United States
- State: Pennsylvania
- County: Westmoreland
- Time zone: UTC-5 (Eastern (EST))
  - Summer (DST): UTC-4 (EDT)
- ZIP code: 15687
- Area code: 724

Stahlstown is a small unincorporated community that is located in Cook Township, Westmoreland County, Pennsylvania, United States. It is situated 50 mi (80 km) southeast of Pittsburgh, 4 mi (6.4 km) northeast of the Donegal exit on the Pennsylvania Turnpike, at the intersection of state route 711 and state route 130.

== History ==
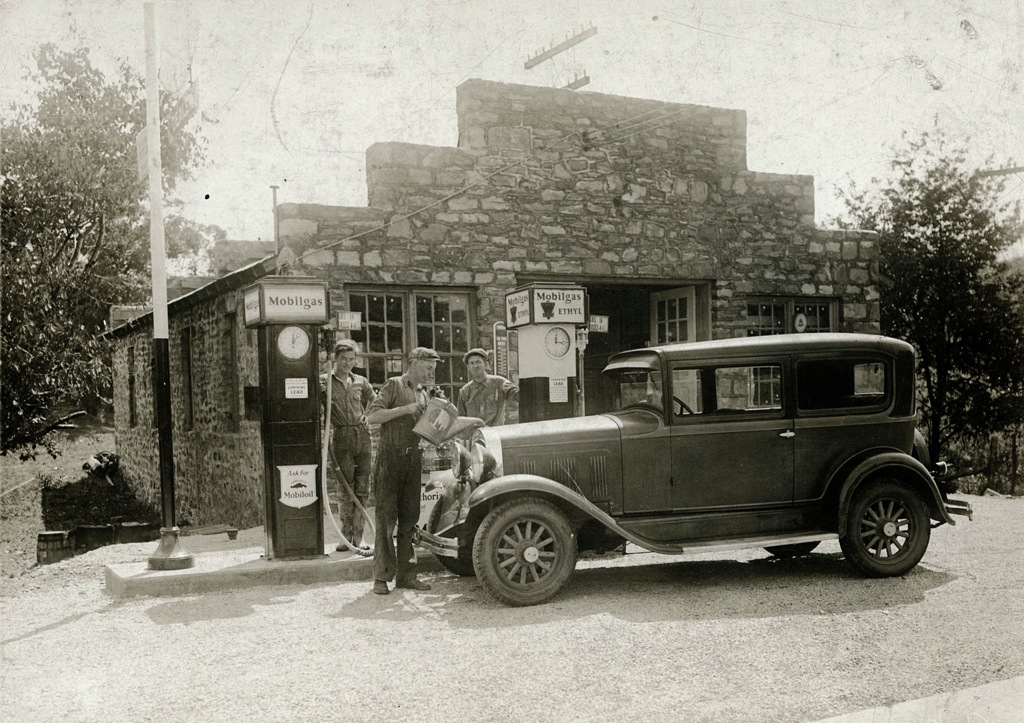
Gas station in Stahlstown

The village was originally known as Centerville, but the name was changed after the Post Office objected there already being a town of Centerville nearby across Laurel Hill in Somerset County. It was then decided to name the town Stahlstown after Leonard Stahl (b. 1734 – d. Nov. 1829) upon whose land the village was built. Leonard Stahl was married to Elizabeth King (daughter of Michael and Susanna (née Passmore) King of Somerset County). Elizabeth's brother William King (b. Nov. 23, 1776 – d. May 5, 1853) was also instrumental in the founding of Stahlstown along with another brother, Enos King (b. Oct. 28, 1768 – d. Aug. 15, 1845), who built the first house in the village near the intersection of route 711 and route 130. The house was built of stone around the year 1799 and in 1882 was occupied by John Roadman (b. March 1821 – d. March 29, 1902), son of Jacob and Ann (King) Roadman. Ann King was William's oldest child. The house is still occupied today.

At one time the small village had as many as three gas stations, a general store, a pub, post office, firehouse, and a Nickelodeon movie theater. The Stahlstown Flax Scutching Grounds is home to the nations second oldest continued Flax Scutching Festival , held annually in the month of September. A popular event for locals and tourists is the "Indian Raid" which is a historical recreation of a typical gun battle between Native American's and American pioneer's that culminates with the burning of mock cabin and ends in a smoky gun battle. In 2007, the festival celebrated its 100th anniversary.

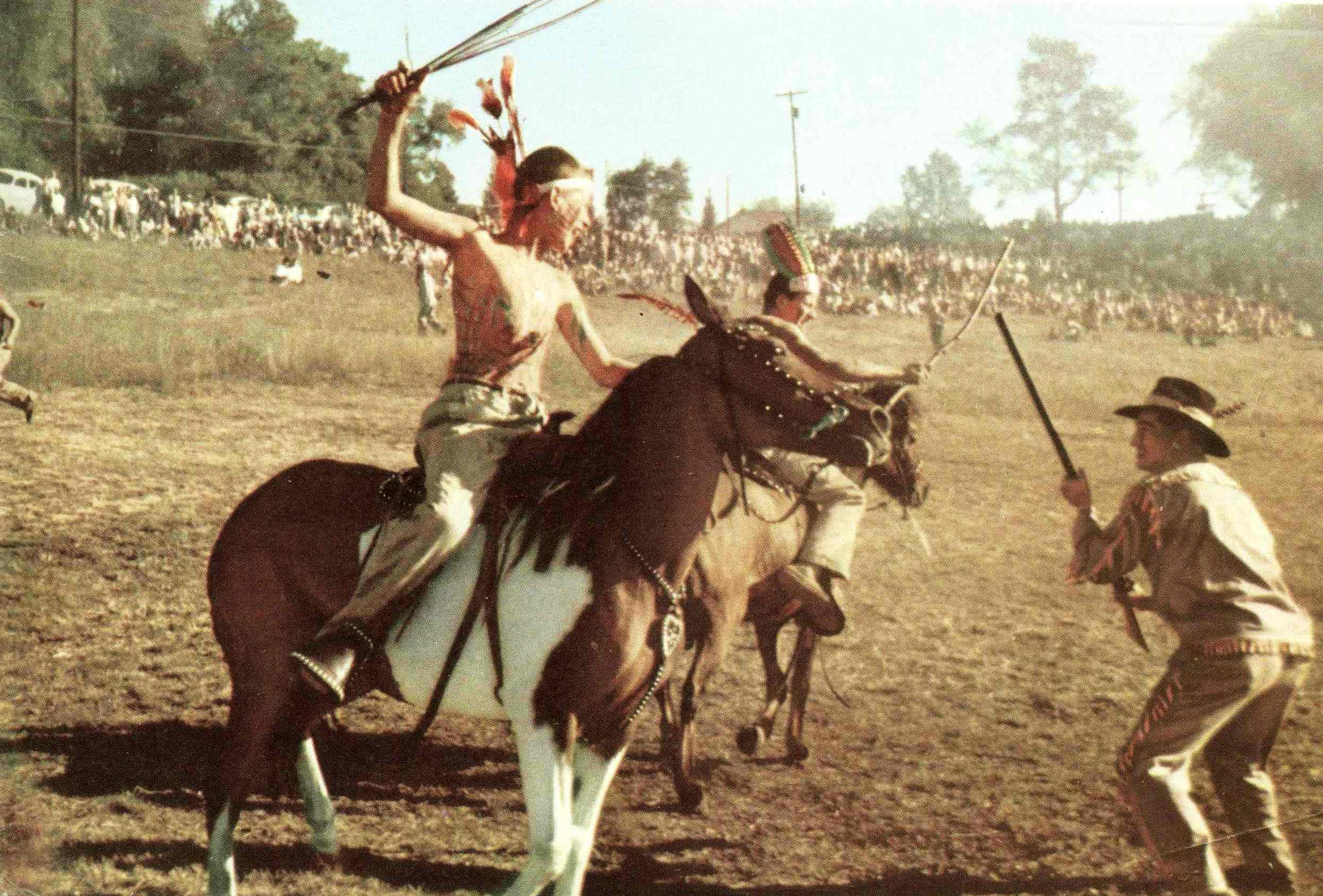
A young boy on horseback, recreating the Indian Raid during the Flax Scutching Festival, September 1960

According to the Chestnut Ridge Historical Society, a farmhouse just outside Stahlstown was used during World War II by the German American Bund as the headquarters to the largest German spy ring in the eastern United States, with connecting offices in Chicago and New York. Residents of the farmhouse were directly on Adolf Hitler's payroll and used the facility to direct and gather information, and place workers in factories, shipyards and even the armed forces. After the war, Hitler planned to build a house in woods of Pennsylvania because of its resemblance to the Black Forest of southwest Germany.

In the 1980s and 1990s Stahlstown was home to North America's only importer for Bimota motorcycles from Rimini, Italy. This would attract customers from all over the country, including celebrities like Jay Leno.

During the second week of July the Chestnut Ridge Community Volunteer Fire Company hosts a week-long fair complete with amusement rides, entertainment, a parade and a Saturday evening display of Zambelli Fireworks.

A unique aspect to the small village, State Route 130 is the division between Mount Pleasant Area School District and Ligonier Valley School District. This has allowed some parents a "gray area" as to which school district they are to send their children.

A private, executive golf course was built in 2017 by Timothy E. Pisula. The course operates as a secondary practice facility for the Mount Pleasant Area Golf Team and former members. The course also hosts the annual Par 3 Classic tournament. Today, the course is maintained and operated by the Pisula family.

Additional references taken from "History of the County of Westmoreland, Pennsylvania, with biographical sketches of many of its prominent men." Edited by George Dallas Albert; pub 1882 by L. H. Everts & Co, Philadelphia and the cemetery records of the Stahlstown Methodist Church Cemetery.

== Notable persons ==
- Henry C. Rial: Renowned experimental / noise artist famous for the Mallard Theory project and Palemoon Productions label.
