= Laurel Ridge =

Laurel Ridge may refer to:

- Laurel Ridge Community College, a community college in Virginia
- Laurel Hill (Pennsylvania), also known as Laurel Ridge or Laurel Mountain, a mountain in Pennsylvania
- Laurel Ridge State Park, in Pennsylvania
- Laurel Ridge (plantation), in Iberville Parish, Louisiana
