= Mount Pleasant Area Junior/Senior High School =

Coordinates: 40.17403°N 79.52687°W

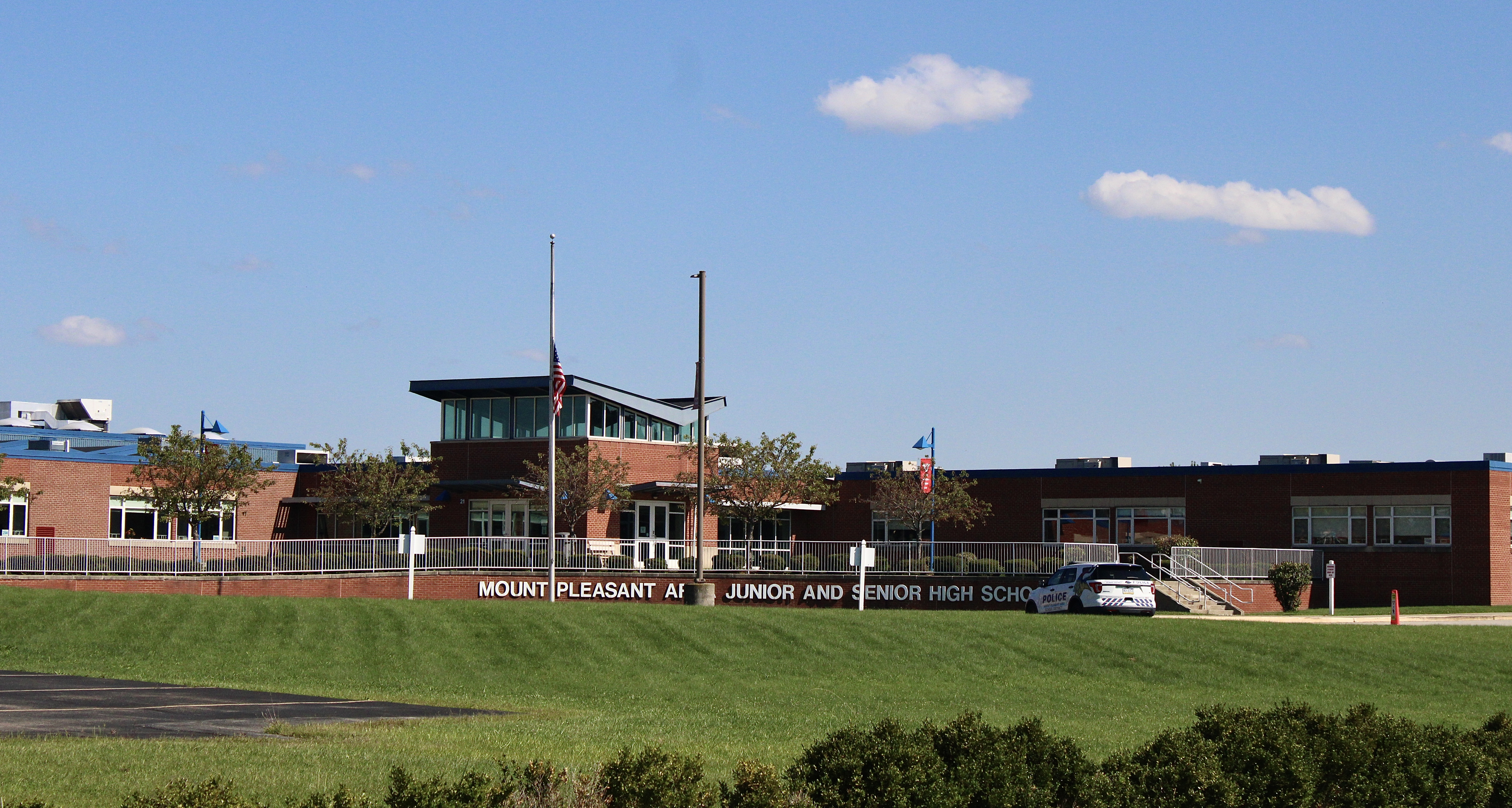
- Mount Pleasant Area Junior/Senior High School in August, 2026

Location
- 265 State Street; Mount Pleasant Township, Westmoreland County, Pennsylvania; Mount Pleasant, Pennsylvania 15666

Information
- School type: Public Junior/Senior High School
- Established: 1964
- School district: Mount Pleasant Area School District
- NCES District ID: 4216170
- NCES School ID: 421617004458 (Sr.), 421617000790 (Jr.)
- Principal: Robert Gumbita
- Faculty: 65
- Grades: 7-12
- Enrollment: 606 (2023-2024)
- Student to teacher ratio: 16:1
- Colors: Red, White, and Blue
- Mascot: Vikings
- Feeder schools: Donegal, Norvelt, and Ramsay Elementary Schools

Mount Pleasant Area Junior/Senior High School is a public high school in Mount Pleasant Township, Westmoreland County, Pennsylvania. It is part of the Mount Pleasant Area School District. It enrolls 1200 students in grades 7-12. It is located off Pennsylvania Route 981. The high school was opened in 1964, and the junior high was added in 1975.

== History ==
Public secondary education in the Mount Pleasant area was originally provided through separate school systems serving Mount Pleasant Borough and Mount Pleasant Township.

Hurst High School was constructed in 1905 in the Hurst section of Mount Pleasant Township, near Kecksburg. The building was expanded in 1928 and served students from the surrounding rural communities of Donegal, Hecla and the aforementioned Kecksburg. Additionally, students beyond the base of Three Mile Hill attended Hurst with district limits extending towards Champion, near Somerset. The building became known as simply Mount Pleasant Township High School by the 1930s. The original Hurst High School building later became the site of a commercial facility.

In Mount Pleasant Borough, Ramsay High School was constructed in 1929 using funds donated by Erskine Ramsay, a businessman who made his fortune in the steel industry. The school was named in his honor in 1930. The building was designed by architect Russell G. Howard and constructed in a Spanish Revival architectural style. The school primarily served students spanning from the borough’s border against Tarrs to the base of Three Mile Hill in Acme.

The two schools operated independently for several decades.

=== Consolidation ===
On August 31, 1965, the Mount Pleasant Area Junior-Senior High School building opened as a joint facility on State Street in Mount Pleasant Township for students previously attending Hurst and Ramsay high schools. A dedication ceremony was held in the school’s gymnasium on November 7 of that same year.

Following the opening of the new secondary-school complex, the former Ramsay High School building was initially repurposed. It subsequently served as a junior high school for Mount Pleasant Borough and Donegal students. During the 1973–1974 school year, the building operated as a middle school, and in 1974–1975 it accommodated students in grades four through eight. The following school year, Ramsay became an elementary school after junior high students were incorporated into the new secondary-school facility.

The Mount Pleasant Area Junior-Senior High School developed into a combined secondary institution serving grades seven through twelve, incorporating a two-grade junior high school and a four-year comprehensive high school.

== Renovation ==
The complex was renovated in phases from April 2001 to August 2003. The renovation cost $23.5 Million and was completed in several phases. It included the addition of a modern Science Wing, modernized planetarium, natatorium, and gymnasiums. Additional office space was added, and internal telephones and internet access were added for each classroom. The cafeteria was modernized into a food-court type setting, the library/media center was completely modernized, as well as the Guidance Area. A new board of directors room was added and the Auditorium was equipped with a state-of-the art lighting and sound system. The field house was renovated in 2007 and a new football field surface was installed, costing $2.6 Million. The athletic complex and MPASD Administration Building are also located on the secondary complex.

== Sports teams ==
Mount Pleasant participates in PIAA District VII (WPIAL)

Sport	Boys	Girls
Football	Class AA	
Baseball	Class AA	
Wrestling	Class AA	
Softball		Class AAA
Basketball	Class AA	Class AA
Track and Field	Class AAAA	Class AAAA
Swimming and Diving	Class AAAA	Class AAAA
Tennis	Class AAAA	Class AAAA
Golf	Class AAAA	Class AAAA
Soccer	Class AA	Class AA

== Vocational-technical school ==
Students in grades 10-12 have the opportunity to attend the Central Westmoreland Career and Technology Center in New Stanton.

== Secondary clubs ==
There are several extra-curricular clubs at the secondary complex, including:

- Art
- Baseball
- Cheerleaders
- Chess
- Concert Band
- French
- French Honor Society
- Gamma Omega - Gifted
- Girls Basketball
- Hockey Club
- Interact
- Jr. High Westmoreland Interscholastic Reading Competition
- Jr. High Newspaper
- Jr. High Student Council
- Jr. High Yearbook
- LEO Club
- Marching Band
- National Art Honor Society
- Quiz Team
- Students Against Drunk Driving (SADD)
- Senior High Student Council
- Senior High Westmoreland Interscholastic Reading Club
- Senior High Yearbook
- Ski Club
- Soccer
- Softball
- Spanish
- Spanish Honor Society
- Spirit Club
- Student Theatre
- Tri-M Music Honor Society
- United We Stand Club
- Wrestling
- YEA
