= Jones Mills, Pennsylvania =

Unincorporated community in Pennsylvania, US

- Unincorporated community
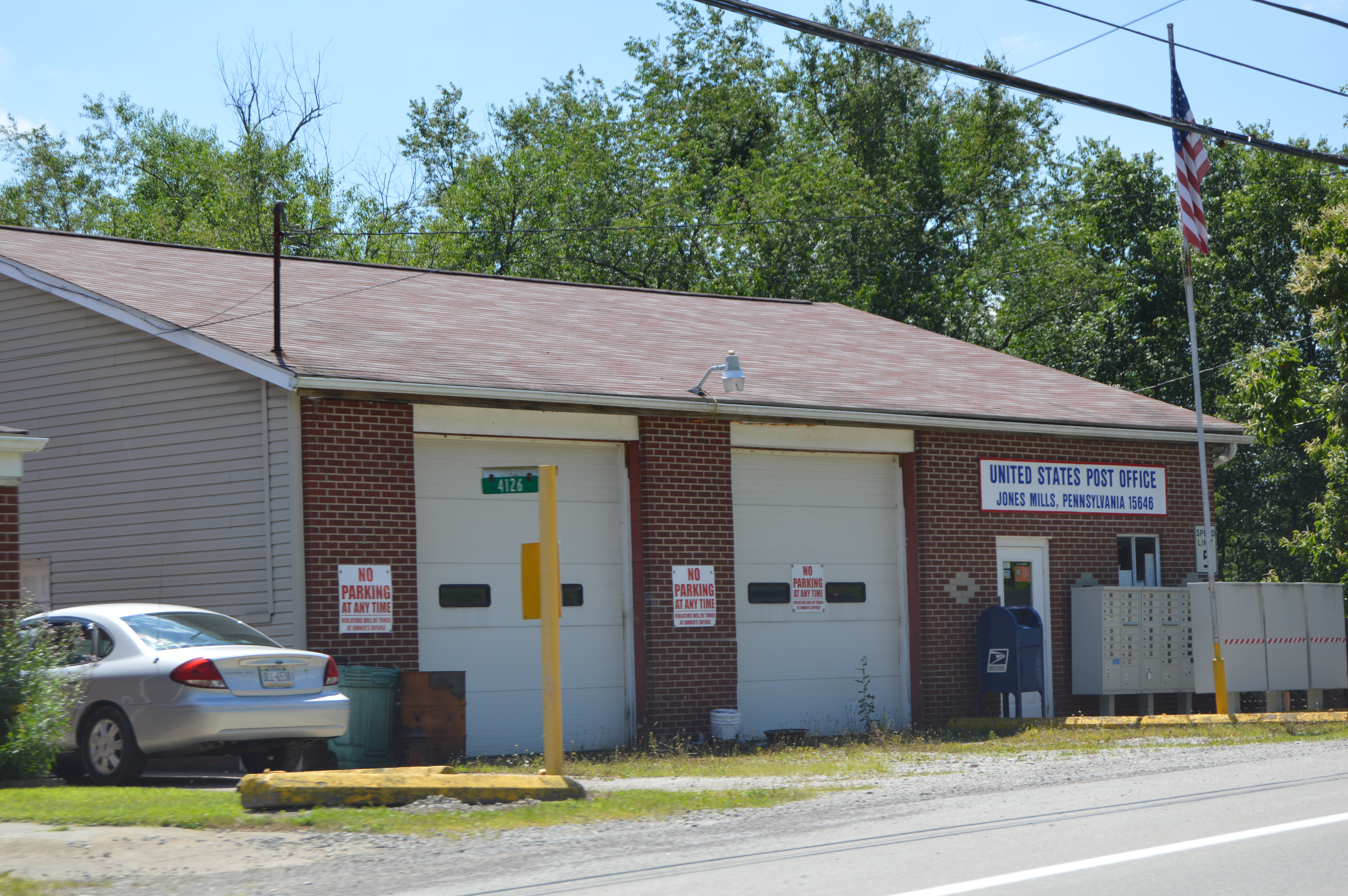
- Post office

- Location within Pennsylvania
- Coordinates: 40°05′19″N 79°20′26″W
- Country: United States
- State: Pennsylvania
- County: Westmoreland
- Elevation: 1,575 ft (480 m)
- Time zone: UTC-5 (Eastern (EST))
  - Summer (DST): UTC-4 (EDT)
- ZIP code: 15646
- Area codes: 724, 878
- GNIS feature ID: 1178150

Jones Mills is an unincorporated community in Donegal Township, Westmoreland County, Pennsylvania, United States . The community is located along Pennsylvania Routes 31 and 381, 2.8 miles (4.5 km) east-southeast of Donegal. Jones Mills has a post office with ZIP code 15646, which opened on May 23, 1850.
