= Potomac Heritage Trail =

Long-distance hiking trail in the United States

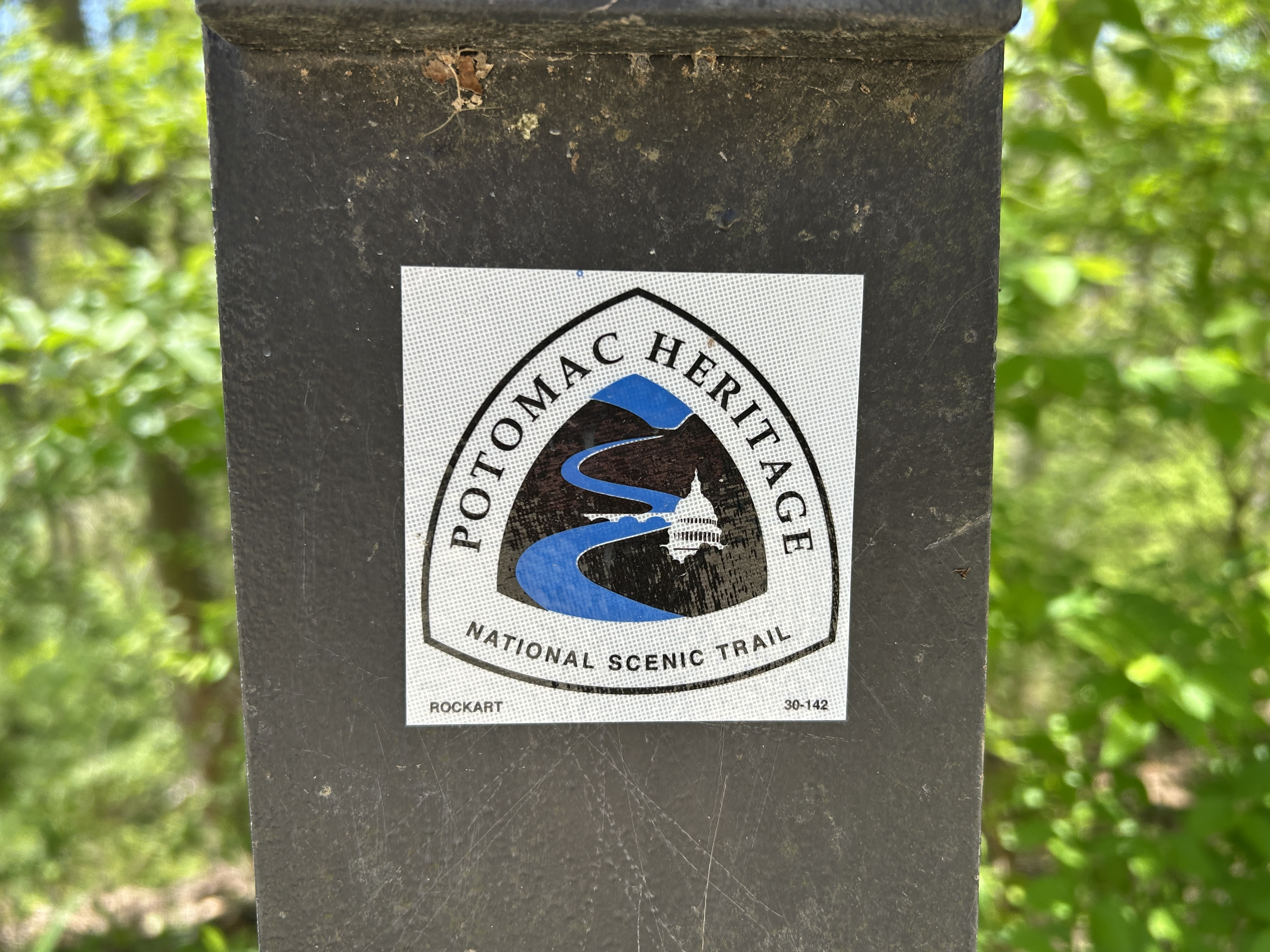
- Potomac Heritage Trail trail marker in Maryland
- Length: 710 mi (1,140 km)
- Location: Virginia / Maryland / Pennsylvania / District of Columbia
- Designation: National Scenic Trail
- Use: Hiking, bicycling
- Season: Year-round
- Surface: Gravel, asphalt, and natural surfaces
- Website: Potomac Heritage National Scenic Trail

The Potomac Heritage Trail, also known as the Potomac Heritage National Scenic Trail or the PHT, is a designated National Scenic Trail corridor spanning parts of the mid-Atlantic region of the United States that will connect various trails and historic sites in Virginia, Maryland, Pennsylvania, and the District of Columbia. The trail network includes 710 miles (1,140 km) of existing and planned sections, tracing the natural, historical, and cultural features of the Potomac River corridor, the upper Ohio River watershed in Pennsylvania and western Maryland, and a portion of the Rappahannock River watershed in Virginia. The trail is managed by the National Park Service and is one of three National Trails that are official NPS units.

Unlike many long-distance hiking trails such as the Appalachian Trail, the Potomac Heritage Trail is an informal route with numerous side trails and alternatives, some in parallel on each side of the river. Currently, many of these are separate, connected to the others only by roads. The PHT crosses the Appalachian Trail near Harpers Ferry, West Virginia, and is concurrent with the American Discovery Trail along the portion of the C&O Canal Towpath between Oldtown, Maryland, and Washington, D.C.

== Initial sections ==
Three substantial sections of the trail were in existence when the Potomac Heritage Trail officially became a National Scenic Trail in 1983. These trails range from hiking-only to multi-use, illustrating the variety of the PHT route.

- The Chesapeake and Ohio Canal Towpath, which runs 184.5 miles (296.9 km) along the Maryland side of the Potomac River between Georgetown in Washington, D.C., and Cumberland, Maryland.
- The Mount Vernon Trail in Virginia, which runs 18 miles (29 km) between Rosslyn and Mount Vernon, parallel to the Potomac River.
- The Laurel Highlands Hiking Trail, running for 70 miles (110 km) in Pennsylvania between Ohiopyle State Park and the Conemaugh Gorge near Johnstown.

== Completed and planned sections ==
Upon its completion, the Potomac Heritage Trail will consist of the following sections:

- The 70-mile (110 km) Laurel Highlands Hiking Trail, within Laurel Ridge State Park in Pennsylvania.
- A 73-mile (117 km) section of the Great Allegheny Passage (GAP), between Cumberland, Maryland and Ohiopyle, Pennsylvania.
- The 184.5-mile (296.9 km) C&O Canal Towpath within the Chesapeake and Ohio Canal National Historical Park, in Maryland, and Washington, D.C.
- A 15-mile (24 km) linear park system in Loudoun County, Virginia.
- 7.7 miles (12.4 km) of trails within Riverbend Park, Great Falls Park, and Scott's Run Nature Preserve in Fairfax County, Virginia.
- Two partially completed routes within the District of Columbia—the 23-mile (37 km) Fort Circle Parks Trail, part of the Civil War Defenses of Washington, and a multi-use route between Georgetown and Oxon Cove Park.
- The paved shared use 18.5-mile (29.8 km) Mount Vernon Trail and a 9.6-mile (15.4 km) gravel trail in and around Arlington and Alexandria, Virginia, mostly alongside the George Washington Memorial Parkway.
- The 23-mile (37 km) Alexandria Heritage Trail in Alexandria, Virginia.
- A 27-mile (43 km) biking trail in Prince George's County, Maryland.
- A 1-mile (1.6 km) trail in Piscataway Park in Prince George's County, Maryland.
- A 2-mile (3.2 km) route within the Nanjemoy Natural Resource Management Area in Charles County, Maryland.
- A biking trail in Charles and St. Mary's counties in Maryland.
- Two 4.5-mile (7.2 km) routes in Prince William Forest Park and a partially completed 8-mile (13 km) route, between Leesylvania State Park and Belmont Bay, in Prince William County, Virginia.
- The Government Island Trail, the planned 5-mile (8.0 km) Historic Falmouth-Ferry Farm Trail, and the Aquia Creek Water Trail, all in Stafford County, Virginia.
- The Northern Neck Heritage Trail Bicycling Route Network in Westmoreland, Northumberland, Lancaster, and Richmond counties, all in Virginia.
