= Adams Falls =

Adams Falls is the name of two waterfalls in the U.S. state of Pennsylvania:

- Adams Falls is one of 24 named Waterfalls in Ricketts Glen State Park in Luzerne County
- Adams Falls is within Linn Run State Park in Westmoreland County
