= Three Mile Hill =

Hill in Pennsylvania, United States

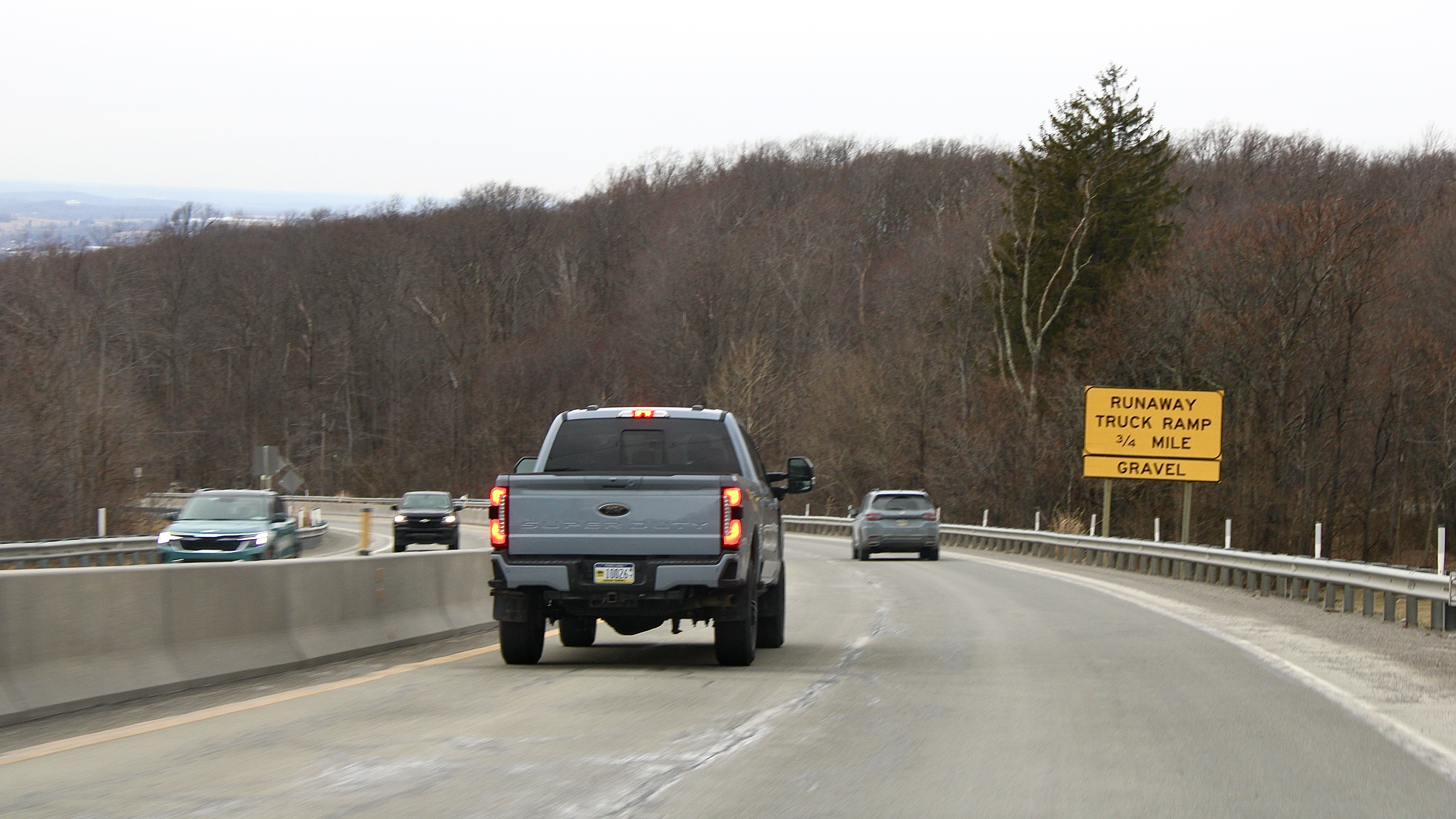
- Three Mile Hill, Route 31

Highest point
- Elevation: 2,080 ft (630 m)
- Coordinates: 40°07′58″N 79°27′11″W

Geography
- Location within Pennsylvania Location within the United States
- Location: Acme, Pennsylvania, United States
- Parent range: Chestnut Ridge (Allegheny Mountains)
- Topo map: USGS Mammoth

Geology
- Mountain type: Hill

Three Mile Hill is a section of Pennsylvania Route 31 (PA 31) near Mount Pleasant, Pennsylvania, that connects Laurelville and Acme.

Though the hill is only two miles (3.2 km) long, the steepness of the hill makes it "feel like [it is] three miles [4.8 km]." From base to summit, the elevation increases by 2,000 feet (610 m).

From its summit in Fayette County, the city of Pittsburgh in Allegheny County is clearly visible despite the two being nearly 36 miles (58 km) from each other.

== Geography ==
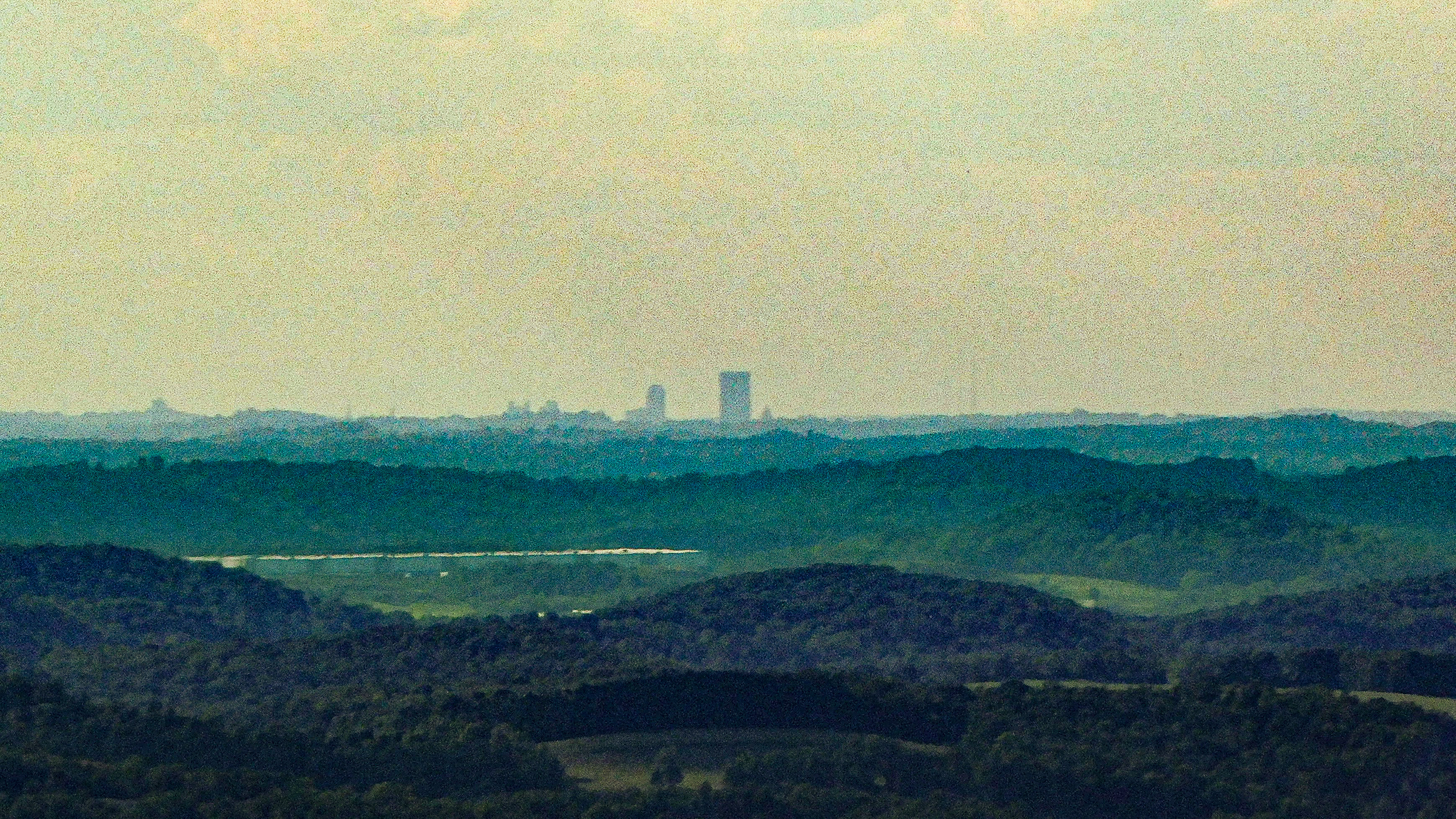
The view of Downtown Pittsburgh as seen from Three Mile Hill

Three Mile Hill is a part of Chestnut Ridge in the Allegheny Mountains. The lanes on Three Mile Hill run east and west.

The base of Three Mile Hill rests at the intersection of PA 31 and PA 982. At the summit lies the intersection of Mountain Top Road and PA 31; the city of Pittsburgh is visible from this intersection. Due to its location, it is the only stretch of highway that directly connects Somerset County, Donegal Township and Mount Pleasant, making it the most effective route for trade with nearby businesses.

The hill's lanes of travel wind sharply, which have made Three Mile Hill the scene of several accidents in the early 20th century. Often used by semi-trailer trucks, the steepness of Three Mile Hill, combined with the winding roads proved to be dangerous. In July 1954, a truck was involved in a wreck with five cars which killed two people and injured eight others because the Route 982 entrance was a blind spot and the truck lost control of its brakes. Incidents like these contributed to new warning signs to be placed at the top of the hill in August 1954; there is a stop sign for trucks as well as a decreased speed limit of 20 miles per hour (32 km/h). There is also a runaway truck ramps in the event a vehicle were to lose control.

== Neighborhoods ==
Three Mile Hill is located on Pennsylvania Route 31. While it is located between Donegal and Mount Pleasant, the hill is home to its own residential neighborhood. While being sections of both Acme, Pennsylvania and Bear Rocks, Pennsylvania, the strip of Route 31 is specifically referred to as "Three Mile Hill" with several homes specifically near the base as well as the summit. These homes are located within the confines of either Mount Pleasant Area School District (base) and Connellsville Area School District (summit). Three Mile Hill is also the location of several businesses that service the area's economy.
