= Laurel Highlands Hiking Trail =

Long-distance hiking trail in the United States

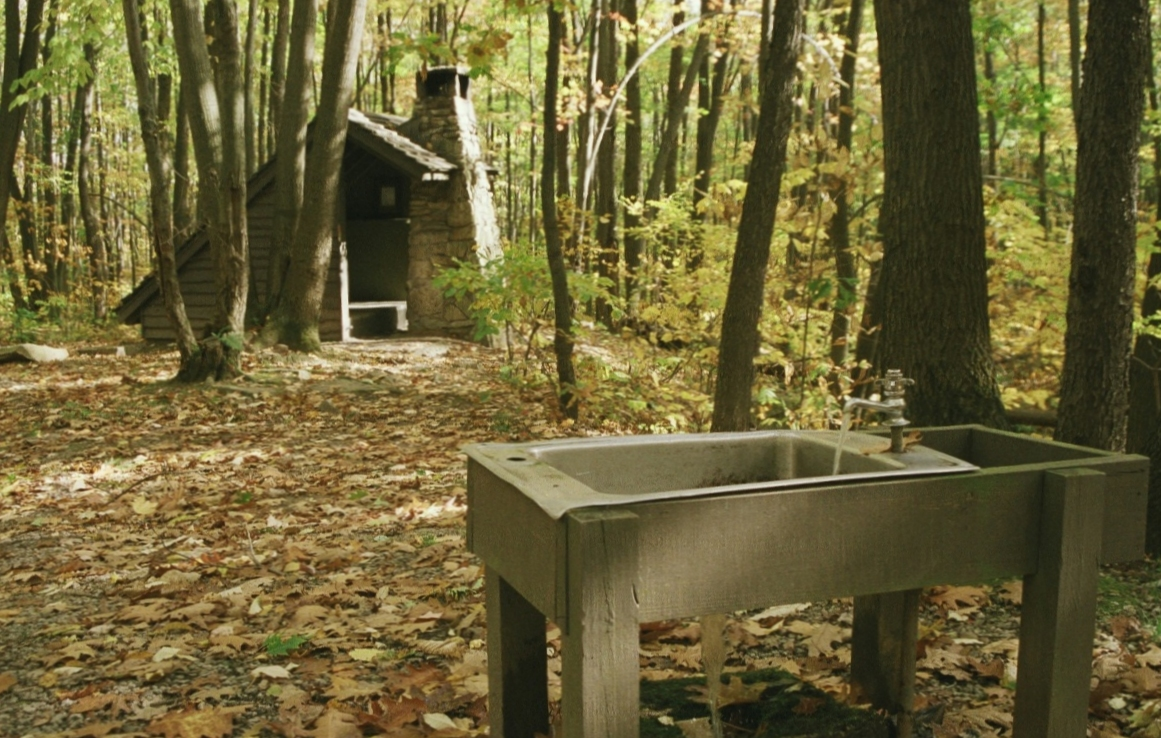
- A backpacking shelter along the Laurel Highlands Hiking Trail
- Length: 70.1 mi (112.8 km)
- Location: Fayette County, Somerset County, Westmoreland County, and Cambria County, Pennsylvania, US
- Trailheads: Ohiopyle State Park; Pennsylvania Route 56
- Use: Hiking
- Highest point: High
- Difficulty: Moderate to strenuous
- Season: Year-round
- Hazards: Uneven and wet terrain, rattlesnakes, mosquitoes, ticks, black bears

Trail map

The Laurel Highlands Hiking Trail is a 70.1-mile (112.8 km) hiking trail in southwestern Pennsylvania, which largely follows the Laurel Hill geologic formation. It begins at Ohiopyle State Park and travels generally to the northeast and ends at Conemaugh Gorge near Johnstown. Construction of the trail began in 1970. It has been named as one of Pennsylvania's most popular backpacking trails and the premier trail in the southwestern region of the state.

Except for climbs out of river valleys at its southwestern and northeastern ends, the trail is relatively level and appropriate for winter uses such as cross-country skiing and snowshoeing. The trail travels through Fayette, Somerset, Westmoreland, and Cambria Counties, usually alongside county lines that follow the ridgetops. Some of the trail is within the boundaries of various discontiguous tracts of Laurel Ridge State Park. It also traverses several other nearby state parks, plus tracts of Forbes State Forest, various Pennsylvania State Game Lands, and a few tracts of private property. The trail is marked with yellow blazes, and several connecting trails to parking or shelters are marked with blue blazes. Parking lots at highway crossings serve as intermediate trailheads and some have drinking water.

Uniquely among long-distance trails in Pennsylvania, the Laurel Highlands Hiking Trail is protected as a linear state park, with management and maintenance coordinated by Laurel Ridge State Park. The trail is also a component of the Potomac Heritage National Scenic Trail and is the only off-road component of that trail.

== Description ==
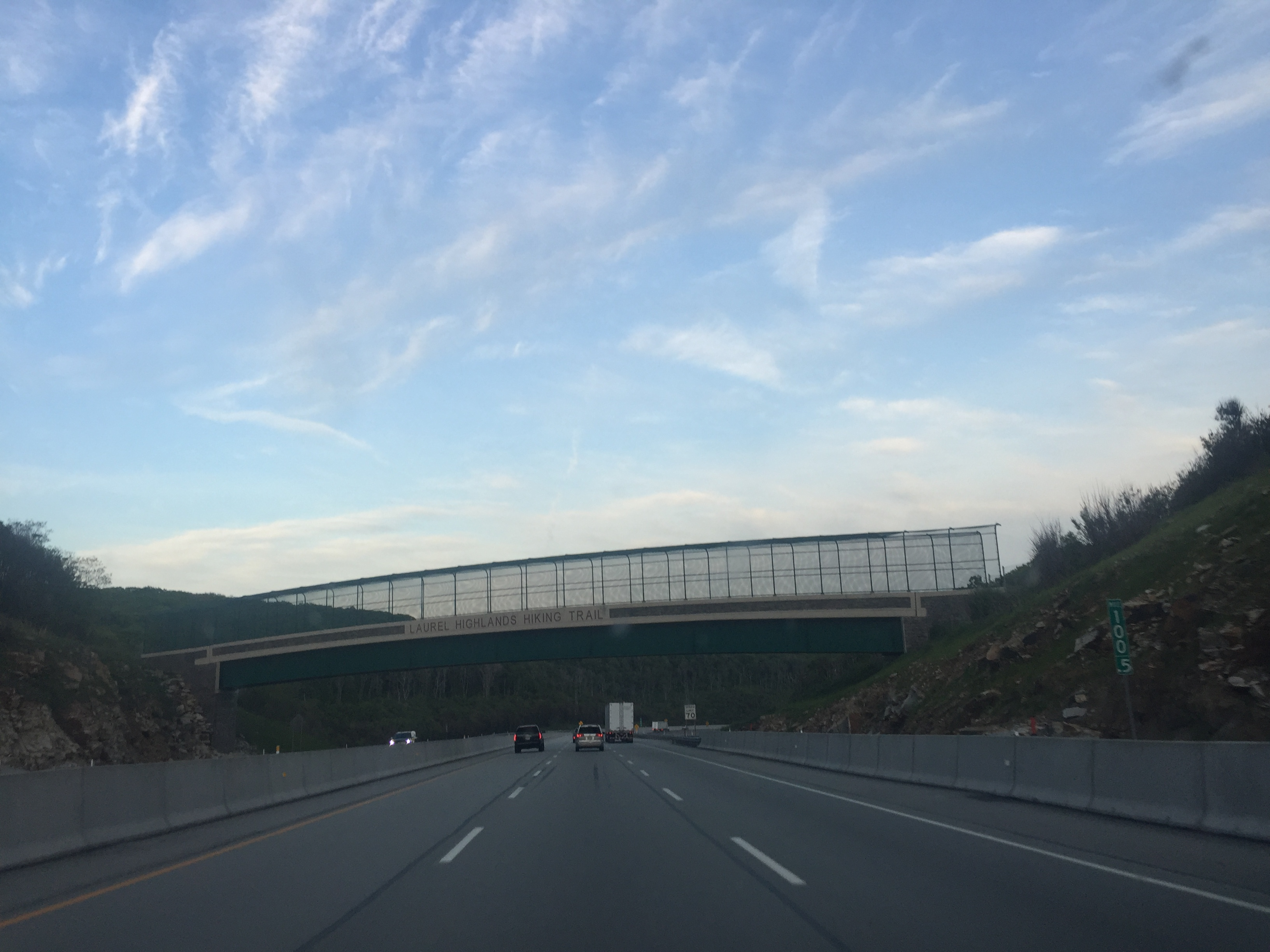
The Laurel Highlands Hiking Trail overpass near mile marker 100 on the Pennsylvania Turnpike.

The Laurel Highlands Hiking Trail is traditionally described from the southwest to northeast. The southwestern trailhead is at Ohiopyle State Park. The trail runs east through the park and parallel to the Youghiogheny River for the first 6 miles (9.7 km). Just past mile 6 the trail passes the access trail to the first overnight shelter area and then trends generally to the northeast. After departing from the river valley, the trail embarks on its only significant climb (when hiked in this direction) as it ascends to the top of Laurel Hill. At about 7 miles the trail leaves the park and enters State Game Lands No. 111.

Just before 15 miles the trail enters Laurel Ridge State Park for the first time, where it continues northeast. Just past 17 miles the trail encounters the access trail to the second overnight shelter. The trail passes the Laurel Ridge State Park office and then crosses PA Route 653 at about 19 miles, then leaves the park and enters Forbes State Forest at about 24 miles. Shortly after this the trail passes the access trail to the third overnight shelter. At about 26 miles the trail crosses some private property then traverses the borough of Seven Springs and runs just west of Seven Springs Mountain Resort.

At about 29 miles the trail re-enters the state forest and then another tract of Laurel Ridge State Park, crossing PA Route 31 at about 31.5 miles. The side trail to the fourth overnight shelter area is reached just after 32 miles. The trail crosses the Pennsylvania Turnpike at about 37 miles. The original pedestrian bridge over the turnpike was closed in 2009, when it was deemed to be dilapidated and dangerous for pedestrians. This severed the hiking route until the bridge was reopened in 2012. This stretch of trail runs through the state forest and three separate tracts of Laurel Ridge State Park.

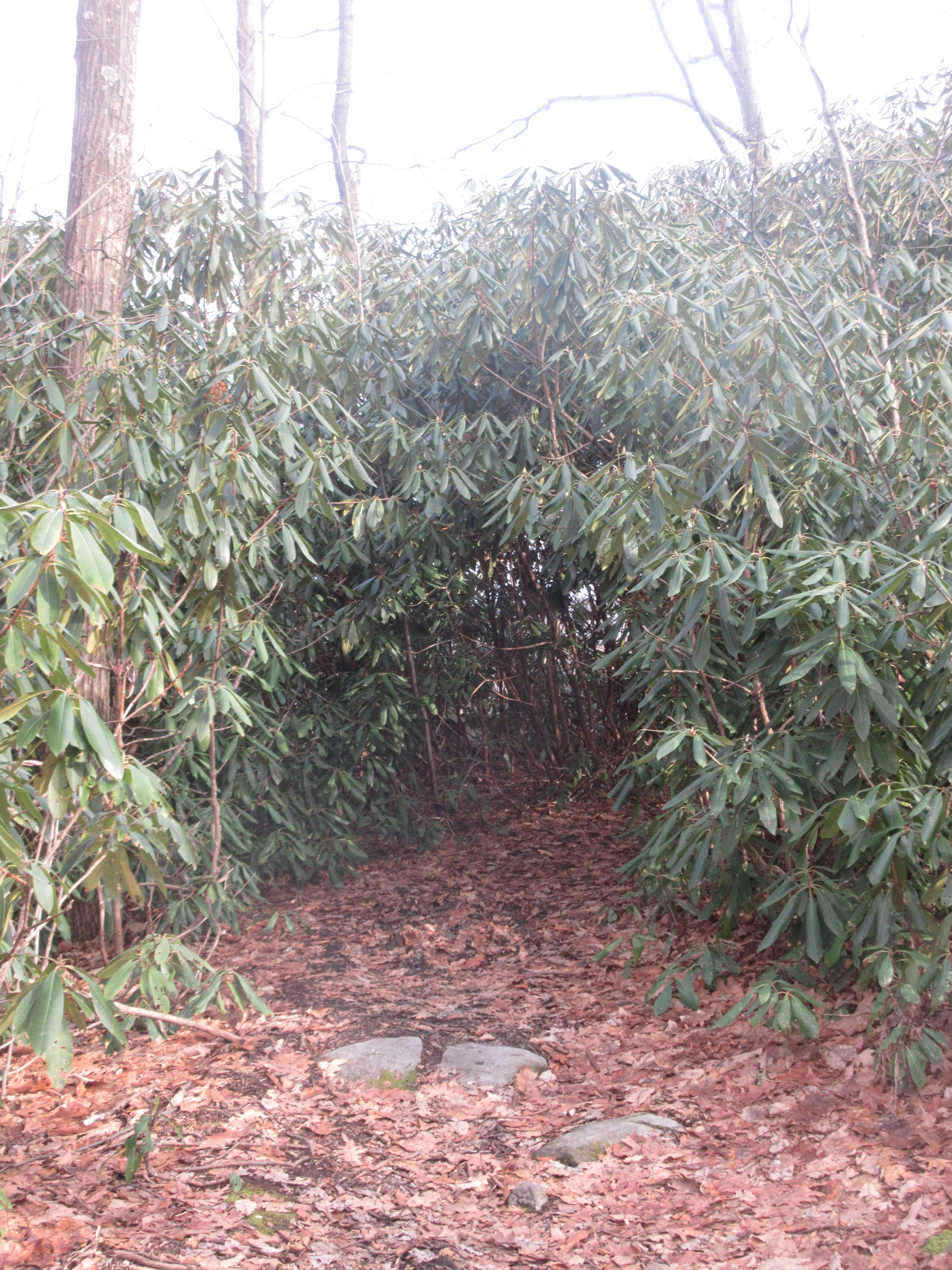
Tunnel of rhododendron along the northern portion of the trail.

At 38 miles, the trail enters yet another tract of Laurel Ridge State Park and the side trail to the fifth overnight shelter, and then passes through the tiny Laurel Summit State Park (a picnic area). In this area, Linn Run State Park and Laurel Mountain State Park are a short distance from the trail. U.S. Route 30 is reached at about 46 miles, followed by the side trail to the sixth overnight shelter. The trail traverses State Game Lands No. 42 for about four miles, enters another tract of Laurel Ridge State Park, and encounters PA Route 271 and the side trail to the seventh overnight shelter at about 57 miles. The trail then traverses the State Game Lands for about another five miles and then enters the final tract of Laurel Ridge State Park at about 62.5 miles.

The access trail to the eighth and final overnight shelter is reached at about 64 miles; unlike the others, this one is not near a major road crossing. Starting at about mile 66, the trail follows the edge of the gorge above the Conemaugh River, with several vistas, and then descends significantly off the northern edge of Laurel Hill. The Laurel Highlands Hiking Trail ends after 70.1 miles at a parking lot that is reached via a side road a short distance from PA Route 56.

== Shelter areas ==
There are eight overnight Adirondack style shelter areas on the Laurel Highlands Hiking Trail, all of which are within the boundaries of various tracts of Laurel Ridge State Park. All are reached via short, blue-blazed side trails leading away from the main trail. These shelter areas are located about every six to ten miles along the trail. In addition to the shelters, there is room for up to thirty tents at each area. Hikers using the shelters are required to make reservations and pay a fee with staff at Laurel Ridge State Park before setting out on their hikes.
