= Cook Township, Westmoreland County, Pennsylvania =

Township in Pennsylvania, US

Coordinates: 40°07′00″N 79°15′59″W

Cook Township, Pennsylvania
- Township
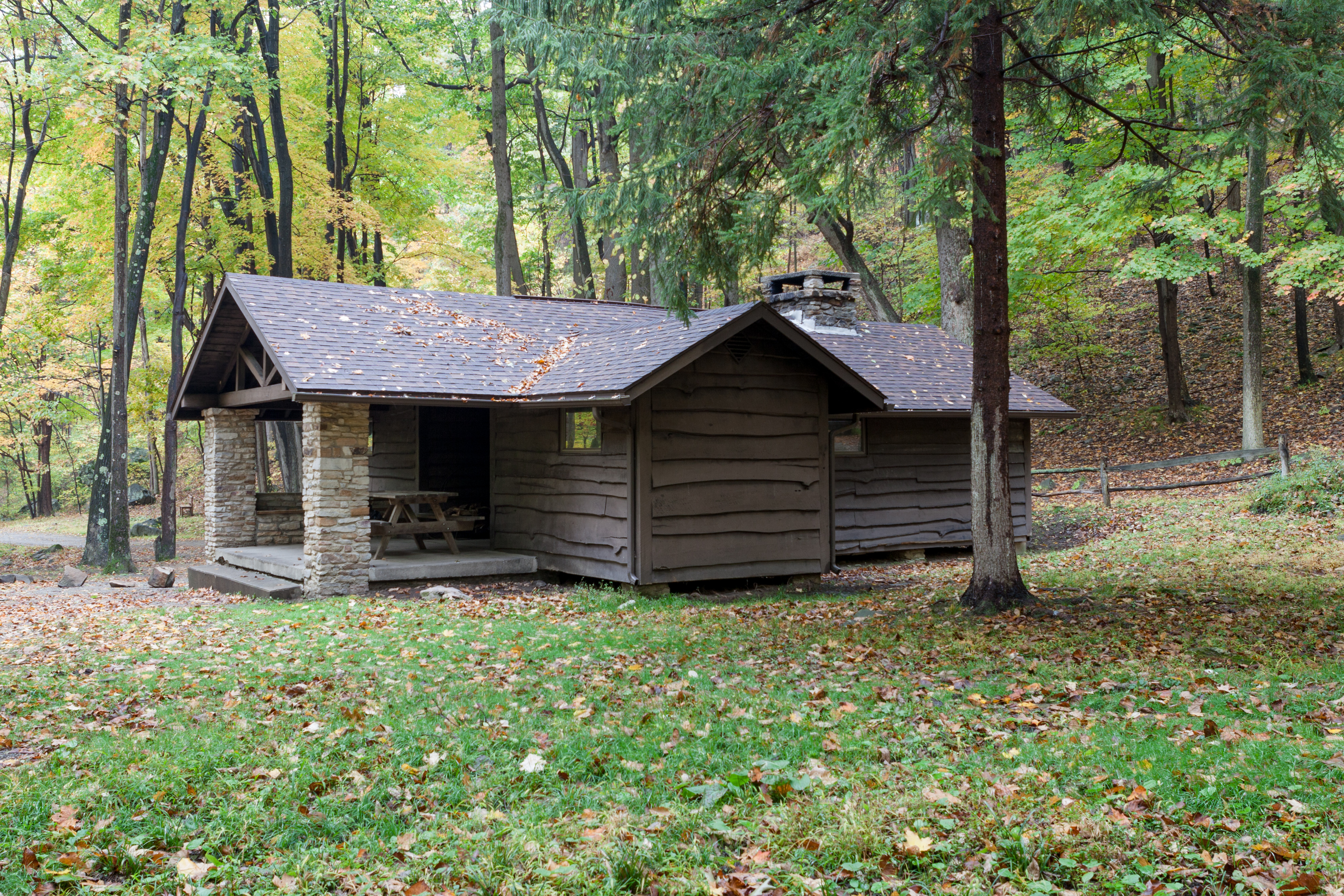
- Family cabin at Linn Run State Park

- Logo

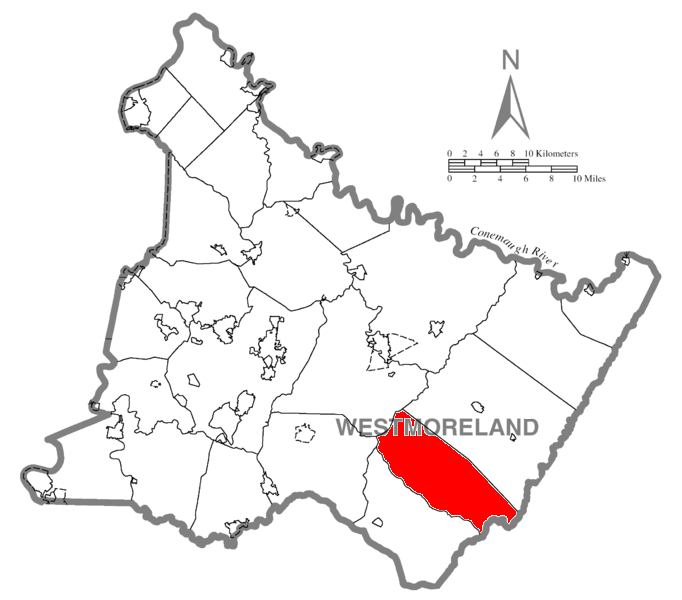
- Map of Westmoreland County, Pennsylvania Highlighting Cook Township

- Map of Pennsylvania highlighting Westmoreland County
- Country: United States
- State: Pennsylvania
- County: Westmoreland
- Settled: 1809
- Incorporated: 1855

Area
  - Total: 46.78 sq mi (121.16 km^{2})
  - Land: 46.76 sq mi (121.11 km^{2})
  - Water: 0.019 sq mi (0.05 km^{2})

Population (2020)
  - Total: 1,888
  - Estimate (2021): 1,873
  - Density: 47.1/sq mi (18.18/km^{2})
- Time zone: UTC-5 (Eastern (EST))
  - Summer (DST): UTC-4 (EDT)
- FIPS code: 42-129-15912
- Website: http://www.cooktwp.com

Cook Township is a township in Westmoreland County, Pennsylvania, United States. The population was 1,888 at the 2020 census, a decrease from 2,250 at the 2010 census, and 2,403 at the 2000 census.

== History ==
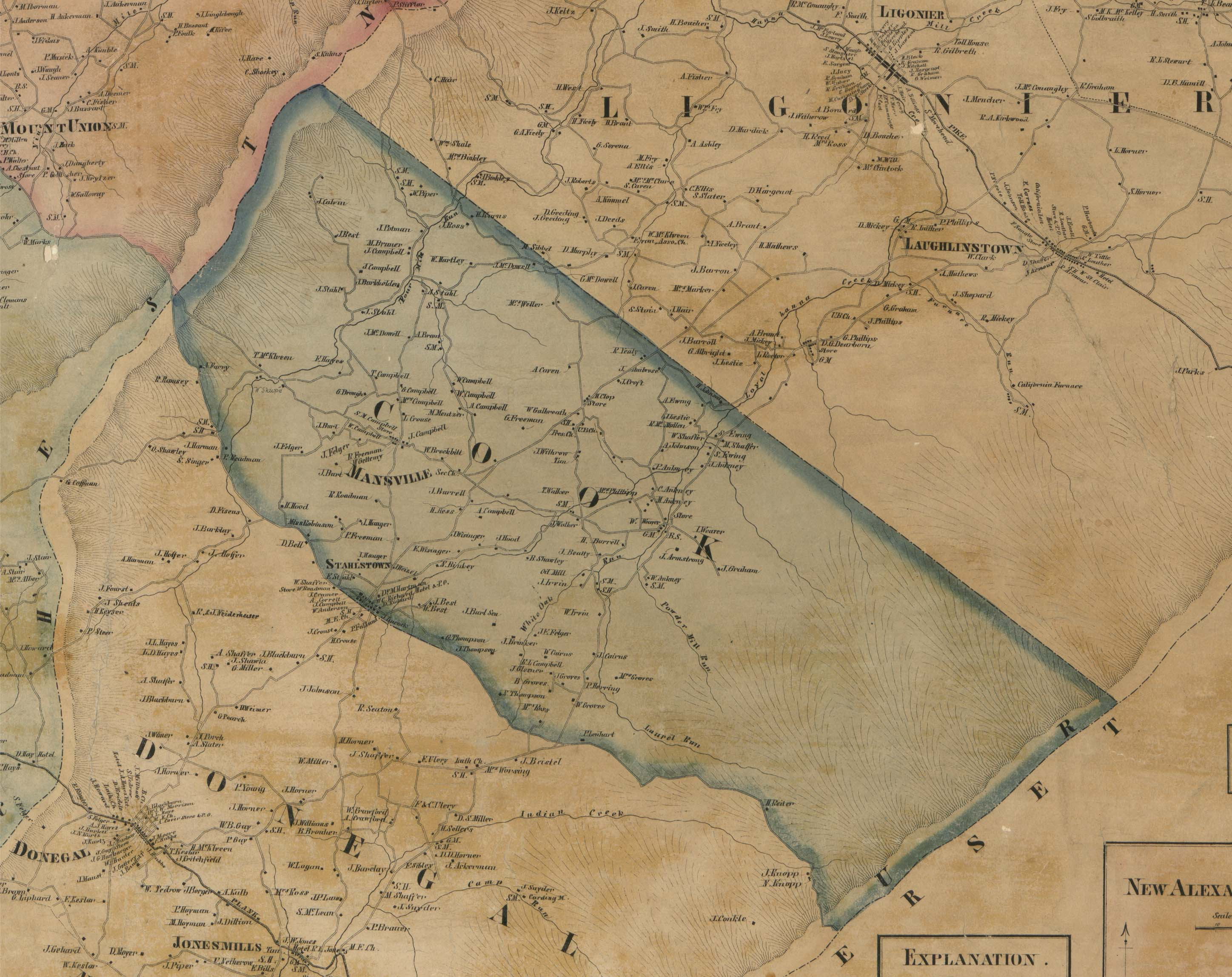
Cook Township, Westmoreland County, Pennsylvania, 1857

The area now known as Cook Township was first settled in the 1800s. Many current residents are descendants of the original settlers.

== Geography ==
According to the United States Census Bureau, the township has a total area of 47.3 square miles (123 km^{2}), of which 47.3 square miles (123 km^{2}) is land and 0.04 square miles (0.10 km^{2}) (0.04%) is water.

It is primarily rural. Forbes State Forest and Linn Run State Park occupy a large portion of the township.

The Linn Run State Park Family Cabin District was listed on the National Register of Historic Places in 1987.

The township contains the following boroughs and villages: Mansville, Pleasant Grove, Rectors Mill, Stahlstown, and Weaver Mill. The township is bordered by Donegal & Mount Pleasant Townships to the southwest, Unity Township to the northwest, Ligonier Township to the northeast, and Somerset County to the southeast.

== Demographics ==
Historical population
Census	Pop.	Note	%±
2000	2,403		—
2010	2,250		−6.4%
2020	1,888		−16.1%
2021 (est.)	1,873		−0.8%
U.S. Decennial Census

At the 2000 census there were 2,403 people, 927 households, and 716 families living in the township. The population density was 50.8 inhabitants per square mile (19.6/km^{2}). There were 1,181 housing units at an average density of 25.0/sq mi (9.6/km^{2}). The racial makeup of the township was 99.79% White, 0.08% Asian, 0.04% from other races, and 0.08% from two or more races. Hispanic or Latino of any race were 0.21%.

Of the 927 households, 30.9% had children under the age of 18 living with them, 69.0% were married couples living together, 5.5% had a female householder with no husband present, and 22.7% were non-families. 19.7% of households were one person and 8.4% were one person aged 65 or older. The average household size was 2.57 and the average family size was 2.96.

The age distribution was 22.2% under the age of 18, 7.4% from 18 to 24, 28.4% from 25 to 44, 28.6% from 45 to 64, and 13.3% 65 or older. The median age was 41 years. For every 100 females, there were 100.8 males. For every 100 females age 18 and over, there were 100.9 males.

The median household income was $39,205 and the median family income was $46,336. Males had a median income of $29,154 versus $25,341 for females. The per capita income for the township was $18,547. About 3.1% of families and 6.4% of the population were below the poverty line, including 5.9% of those under age 18 and 9.8% of those age 65 or over.
