= Sugarloaf Knob =

Mountain in Pennsylvania, United States

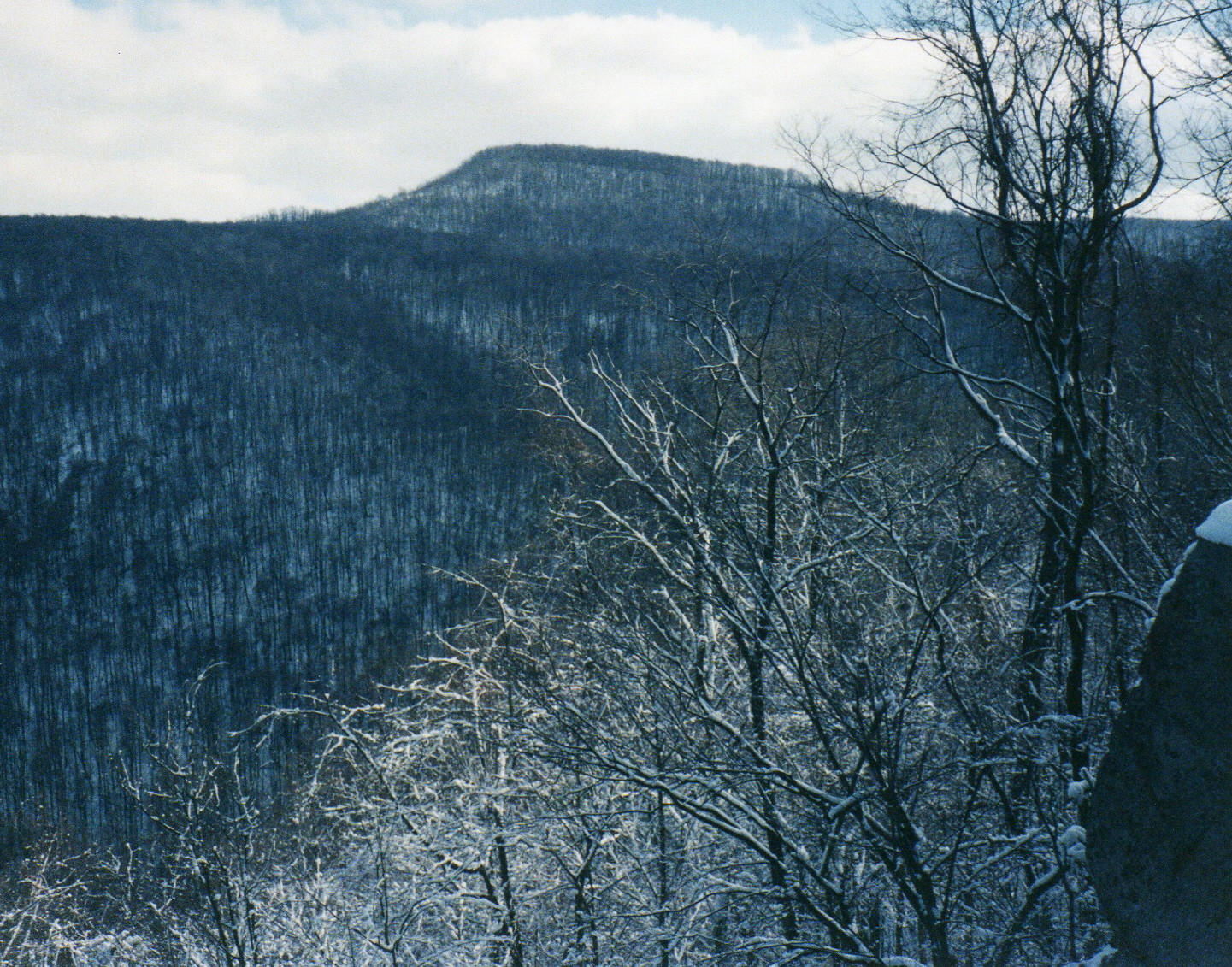
- Sugarloaf Knob

Highest point
- Elevation: 2,667 feet (810 m)
- Prominence: 240 feet (70 m)
- Coordinates: 39°49.88′N 79°27.90′W

Geography
- Location: Fayette County, Pennsylvania, U.S.
- Parent range: Allegheny Mountains
- Topo map(s): USGS Ohiopyle, PA

Sugarloaf Knob is a well-known summit within Ohiopyle State Park on the south end of the Laurel Ridge. This mountain has a unique profile and can easily be recognized at different lookouts in the park and surrounding area. The Youghiogheny River cuts beneath the "knob" and Laurel Hill creating a 1,700-foot (520 m) deep chasm. The highest peak in the area is the south end of the Laurel Hill Ridge as it reaches 2,920 ft (890 m) above sea level.

Sugarloaf Knob is easily accessible by a park road which takes you to just below the summit. A short bushwhack from there will get you to the top of the mountain.
