= Donegal Township, Pennsylvania =

Donegal Township is the name of some places in the U.S. state of Pennsylvania:

- Donegal Township, Butler County, Pennsylvania
- Donegal Township, Washington County, Pennsylvania
- Donegal Township, Westmoreland County, Pennsylvania

== See also ==
- East Donegal Township, Lancaster County, Pennsylvania
- West Donegal Township, Pennsylvania
