= Laurel Hill (Pennsylvania) =

Mountain in Pennsylvania, United States

Coordinates: 40°9′39″N 79°9′52″W

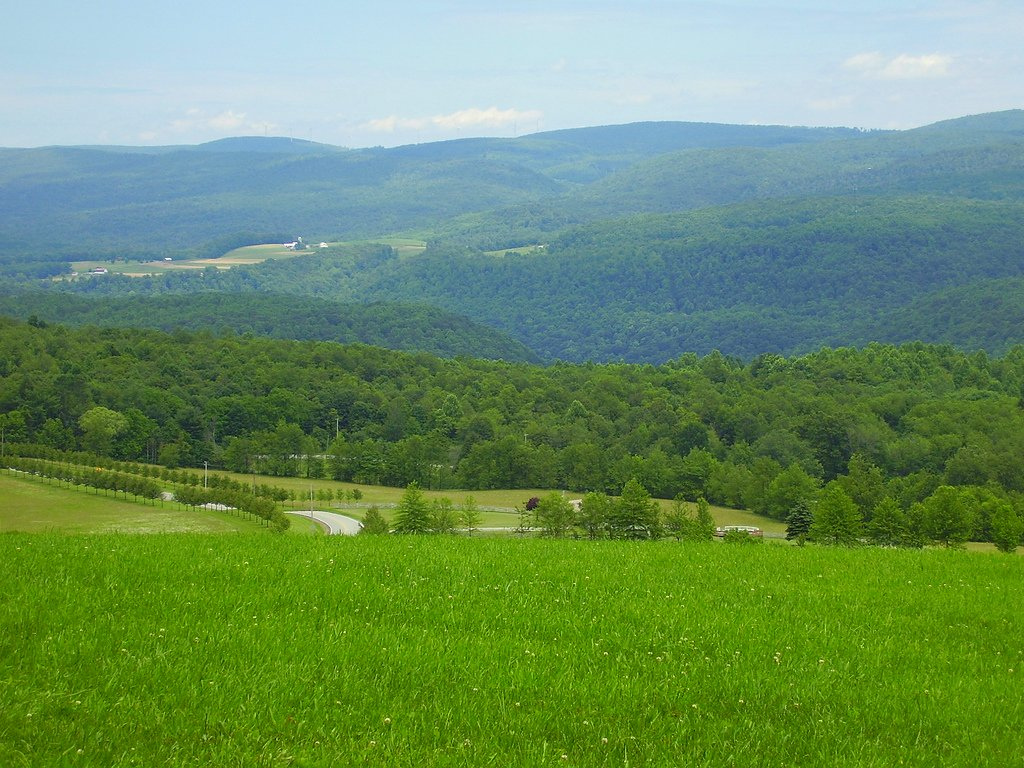
- Laurel Hill from Kentuck Knob, Pennsylvania

Highest point
- Elevation: 2,994 ft (913 m)

Geography
- Location: Pennsylvania, U.S.
- Parent range: Allegheny Mountains
- Topo map(s): USGS Ohiopyle, Mill Run, Kingwood, Seven Springs, Bakersville, Ligonier, Boswell, Rachelwood, Vintondale, Johnstown, New Florence (PA) Quadrangle

Climbing
- First ascent: unknown
- Easiest route: drive up and hike

Laurel Hill, also known as Laurel Ridge or Laurel Mountain, is a 70-mile-long (110 km) mountain that is located in Pennsylvania's Allegheny Mountains. Located in the Laurel Highlands region, this ridge is flanked by Negro Mountain to its east and Chestnut Ridge to its west. The mountain is home to six state parks: Laurel Ridge State Park, Laurel Mountain State Park, Linn Run State Park, Kooser State Park, Laurel Hill State Park, and Ohiopyle State Park. The 70-mile-long (110 km) Laurel Highlands Hiking Trail runs the length of the ridge.

== History and notable features ==
In the 1770s, Laurel Hill and lands west of the Allegheny Mountains were contested territory between the colonies of Pennsylvania and Virginia. In August of 1774, governor of Virginia John Murray, 4th Earl of Dunmore issued the following proclamation: “ ..whereas the Province of Pennsylvania has unduly laid claim to … His Majesty’s territory…. I do hereby in His Majesty’s name require & command all of His Majesty’s subjects West of Laurel Hill to pay a due respect to my Proclamation, strictly prohibiting the authority of Pennsylvania at their peril.” [1]

Two state forests, comprising over 22,000 acres (89 km^{2}), are located on Laurel Hill: Gallitzin State Forest and Forbes State Forest. State Game Lands 42 and 111 are also located on the mountain and also comprise a little over 22,000 acres (89 km^{2}).

Laurel Hill has an average elevation of 2,700 ft (820 m) along its length, while there are individual "knobs" that rise above 2,900 ft (880 m). The highest point is located above the Seven Springs Mountain Resort at 2,994 ft (913 m). Laurel Hill is flanked on its north end by the Conemaugh Gorge and on its south end by the Youghiogheny Gorge, both water gaps being approximately 1,700 ft (520 m) in depth. The ridge continues north of the Conemaugh Gorge for several miles as Rager Mountain, which reaches an elevation of 2,580 feet (790 m). South of the Youghiogheny Gorge, a short ridge, generally still labeled Laurel Hill, at the edge of Ohiopyle State Park, reaches above 2,920 feet (890 m).

The industrial city of Johnstown and historic borough of Ligonier are located near its northern end, while the recreational boroughs of Confluence and Ohiopyle are located towards its southern end. Two major highways cross Laurel Hill, the Pennsylvania Turnpike and U.S. Route 30. The abandoned Laurel Hill Tunnel goes beneath Laurel Hill. A number of smaller state roads cross at other points on the mountain.

== Geology ==
Laurel Hill is made up of Mississippian and Pennsylvanian clastic sedimentary rocks, consisting mostly of conglomerate, sandstone, and shale. Formations include the Burgoon, Mauch Chunk, Pottsville, and Allegheny. The mountain is anticlinal in structure.

Along the length of this ridge there are several prominent knobs that rise from the ridgeline. They are as follows south to north: Sugarloaf Knob 2,667 ft (813 m), Highpoint 2,994 ft (913 m), Birch Rock Hill 2,934 ft (894 m), Painter Rock Hill 2,920 ft (890 m), Bald Knob 2,930 ft (890 m), Ulery Hill 2,820 ft (860 m), Pea Vine Hill 2,900 ft (880 m), Pikes Peak 2,840 ft (870 m), Mystery Hill 2,880 ft (880 m), and Sugar Camp Hill 2,908 ft (886 m).

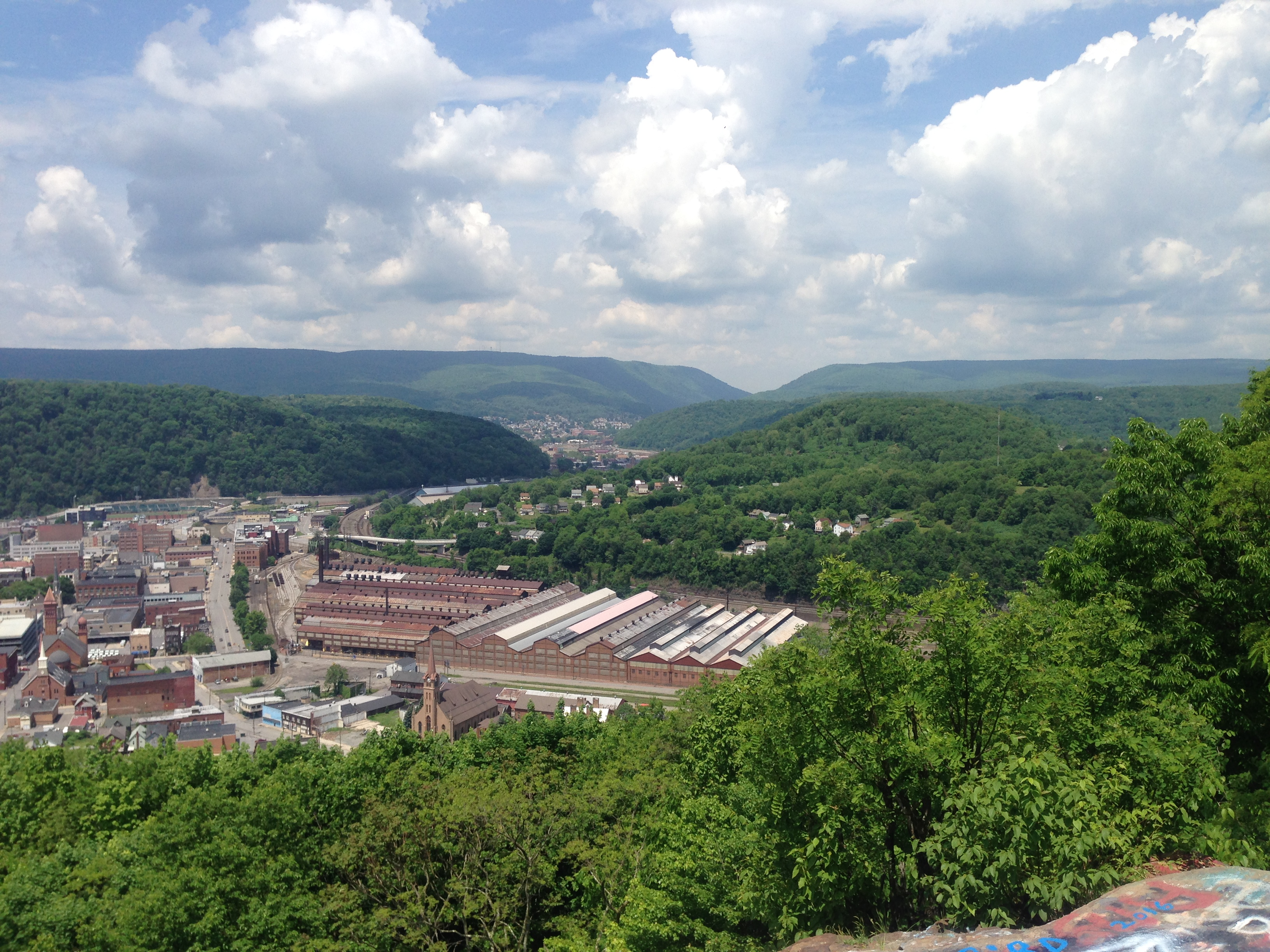
View of northern Laurel Hill and Conemaugh River gap, city of Johnstown in the foreground

== Climate ==
The Laurel Hill region shares the humid continental climate of the Mid-Atlantic region in which it is located.

The mountain ridge is oriented at right angles to approaching weather systems, forcing prevailing westerly airflows upward. As rising air cools, moisture in the air mass condenses; once reaching the saturation point, precipitation results. Laurel Hill may also act as a barrier to weather systems and slow the movement of storms, which has an impact on the local area and forms a microclimate. Although the mountain is not high enough to create its own weather, its orography is enough to gently nudge weather from hot to warm, cool to cold, and from rain to snow; along with moisture from the Great Lakes, the latter can result in heavy snowfall during winter months. The mountain ridge can be 5 to 10 °F (−15 to −12 °C) cooler than surrounding towns and valleys, depending on other weather variables.

Climate data for Laurel Summit, Pennsylvania, 1991–2020 normals: 2730ft (832m)
Month	Jan	Feb	Mar	Apr	May	Jun	Jul	Aug	Sep	Oct	Nov	Dec	Year
Mean daily maximum °F (°C)	30.9 (−0.6)	33.9 (1.1)	42.7 (5.9)	56.1 (13.4)	64.5 (18.1)	71.2 (21.8)	74.5 (23.6)	73.8 (23.2)	68.0 (20.0)	57.7 (14.3)	45.7 (7.6)	35.2 (1.8)	54.5 (12.5)
Daily mean °F (°C)	22.6 (−5.2)	24.8 (−4.0)	32.7 (0.4)	45.1 (7.3)	54.7 (12.6)	62.3 (16.8)	66.4 (19.1)	65.3 (18.5)	59.4 (15.2)	48.4 (9.1)	37.4 (3.0)	27.7 (−2.4)	45.6 (7.5)
Mean daily minimum °F (°C)	14.4 (−9.8)	15.7 (−9.1)	22.7 (−5.2)	34.1 (1.2)	44.9 (7.2)	53.4 (11.9)	58.2 (14.6)	56.8 (13.8)	50.7 (10.4)	39.2 (4.0)	29.2 (−1.6)	20.1 (−6.6)	36.6 (2.6)
Average precipitation inches (mm)	4.41 (112)	3.50 (89)	4.72 (120)	4.87 (124)	5.47 (139)	5.94 (151)	5.14 (131)	4.78 (121)	4.81 (122)	4.23 (107)	4.31 (109)	4.43 (113)	56.61 (1,438)
Average snowfall inches (cm)	38.60 (98.0)	37.50 (95.3)	21.50 (54.6)	6.90 (17.5)	0.30 (0.76)	0.00 (0.00)	0.00 (0.00)	0.00 (0.00)	0.00 (0.00)	2.40 (6.1)	8.10 (20.6)	26.90 (68.3)	142.2 (361.16)
Source: NOAA

Climate data for Laurel Summit, Pennsylvania (2,600 ft ASL) (1981–2010 normals, extremes 1967–present)
Month	Jan	Feb	Mar	Apr	May	Jun	Jul	Aug	Sep	Oct	Nov	Dec	Year
Record high °F (°C)	63 (17)	73 (23)	75 (24)	83 (28)	85 (29)	85 (29)	86 (30)	87 (31)	89 (32)	79 (26)	75 (24)	68 (20)	89 (32)
Mean daily maximum °F (°C)	29.7 (−1.3)	33.9 (1.1)	42.8 (6.0)	55.6 (13.1)	63.2 (17.3)	70.2 (21.2)	73.5 (23.1)	72.7 (22.6)	66.9 (19.4)	56.6 (13.7)	46.1 (7.8)	34.1 (1.2)	53.8 (12.1)
Daily mean °F (°C)	22.7 (−5.2)	25.6 (−3.6)	33.6 (0.9)	45.1 (7.3)	54.1 (12.3)	62.2 (16.8)	66.1 (18.9)	65.3 (18.5)	58.1 (14.5)	47.7 (8.7)	38.0 (3.3)	27.0 (−2.8)	45.4 (7.4)
Mean daily minimum °F (°C)	15.7 (−9.1)	17.3 (−8.2)	24.3 (−4.3)	34.6 (1.4)	44.9 (7.2)	54.1 (12.3)	58.7 (14.8)	57.9 (14.4)	49.3 (9.6)	38.8 (3.8)	29.8 (−1.2)	19.9 (−6.7)	37.1 (2.8)
Record low °F (°C)	−40 (−40)	−31 (−35)	−22 (−30)	3 (−16)	17 (−8)	27 (−3)	32 (0)	30 (−1)	18 (−8)	7 (−14)	−10 (−23)	−21 (−29)	−40 (−40)
Average precipitation inches (mm)	4.14 (105)	3.37 (86)	4.62 (117)	4.36 (111)	5.06 (129)	4.95 (126)	4.87 (124)	4.47 (114)	4.23 (107)	3.88 (99)	4.72 (120)	4.04 (103)	52.71 (1,339)
Average snowfall inches (cm)	41.8 (106)	40.1 (102)	22.2 (56)	6.7 (17)	0.2 (0.51)	0 (0)	0 (0)	0 (0)	0 (0)	2.5 (6.4)	9.1 (23)	29.0 (74)	151.6 (385)
Average precipitation days (≥ 0.01 in)	23.3	24.6	16.1	15.5	14.7	12.5	10.8	10.5	9.3	12.3	18.5	24.7	192.8
Average snowy days (≥ 0.1 in)	21.2	22.3	11.3	6.7	1.2	0	0	0	0	1.5	8.3	20.1	92.6
Source: NOAA

== Ecology ==
Located within the Appalachian mixed mesophytic forests ecoregion, Laurel Hill is dominated by northern hardwoods, especially in its cool ravines, moist slopes, and sheltered valleys with stands of second-growth and old-growth hemlocks in Laurel Hill State Park with the old-growth estimating to be over 200-300 years old and up to 3½ (3.5) feet in diameter.

=== Flora ===
The forest canopy features eastern hemlock (Tsuga canadensis), sugar maple (Acer saccharum), red maple (Acer rubrum), yellow birch (Betula alleghaniensis), sweet birch (Betula lenta), black cherry (Prunus serotina), and white pine (Pinus strobus). On upper slopes and ridgetops, red oak (Quercus rubra), chestnut oak (Quercus montana), and scarlet oak (Quercus coccinea) occur, with scattered pitch pine (Pinus rigida) and red spruce (Picea rubens) on rocky exposures. Shrub and understory vegetation includes great laurel (Rhododendron maximum), mountain laurel (Kalmia latifolia), hay-scented fern (Dennstaedtia punctilobula), and northern maidenhair fern (Adiantum pedatum). American chestnut (Castanea dentata) persists in the understory as sprouts, though blight prevents most from reaching maturity.

=== Fauna ===
Birds include common raven, wild turkey, hermit thrush, Canada warbler, brown creeper, winter wren, black throated blue warbler, blue-headed vireo, and red-eyed vireo. Raptors include broad-winged hawk, red-tailed hawk, red shouldered hawk, and barred owls. Mammals commonly seen include white-tailed deer, eastern chipmunk, eastern gray squirrel, raccoon, opossum, and groundhog. American black bear are occasionally present but are reclusive. Reptiles include the timber rattlesnake (Crotalus horridus) and eastern copperhead (Agkistrodon contortrix) in rocky areas. Moist ravines and bogs host salamanders, frogs, and diverse invertebrate life.
