= Donegal Township, Westmoreland County, Pennsylvania =

Township in Pennsylvania, US

Coordinates: 40°05′00″N 79°18′59″W

- Township
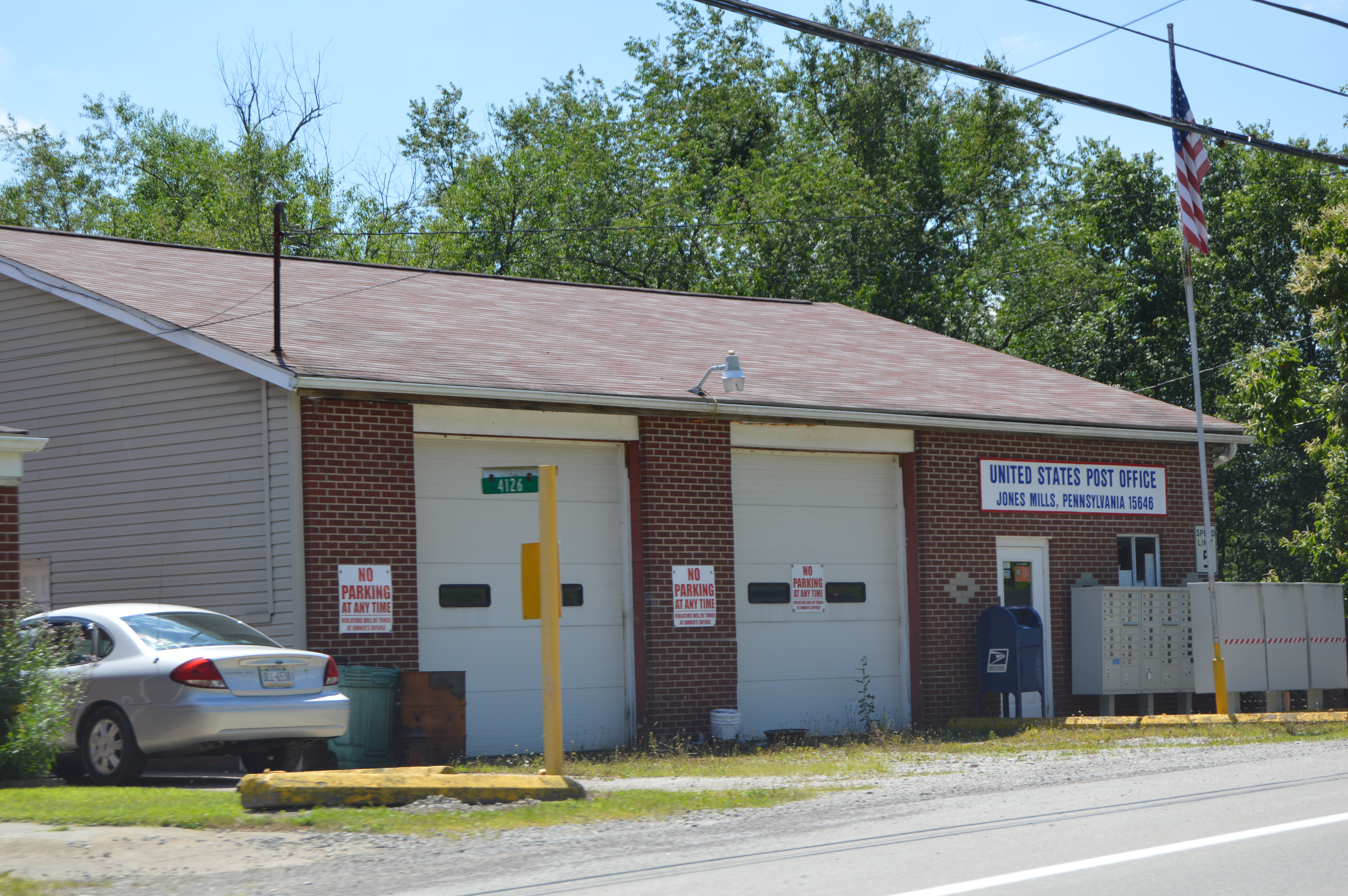
- Post office at Jones Mills

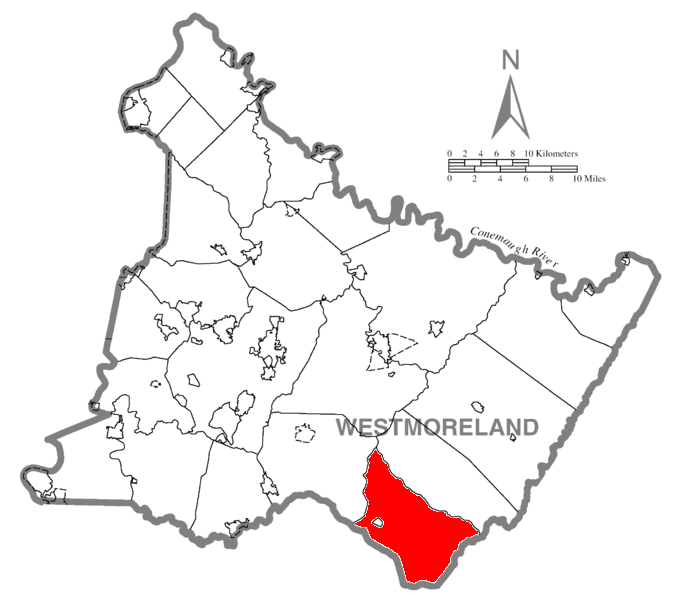
- Map of Westmoreland County, Pennsylvania Highlighting Donegal Township

- Map of Pennsylvania highlighting Westmoreland County
- Country: United States
- State: Pennsylvania
- County: Westmoreland
- Incorporated: April 6, 1773

Area
  - Total: 49.23 sq mi (127.51 km^{2})
  - Land: 49.10 sq mi (127.18 km^{2})
  - Water: 0.13 sq mi (0.33 km^{2})

Population (2020)
  - Total: 2,192
  - Density: 44.7/sq mi (17.24/km^{2})
- Time zone: UTC-5 (Eastern (EST))
  - Summer (DST): UTC-4 (EDT)
- FIPS code: 42-129-19480
- Website: http://www.donegaltownship.com

Donegal Township is a township in Westmoreland County, Pennsylvania, United States. The population was 2,192 at the 2020 census, a decrease of 9% compared to 2010.

It was named after the town and county of Donegal in Ireland.

== Geography ==
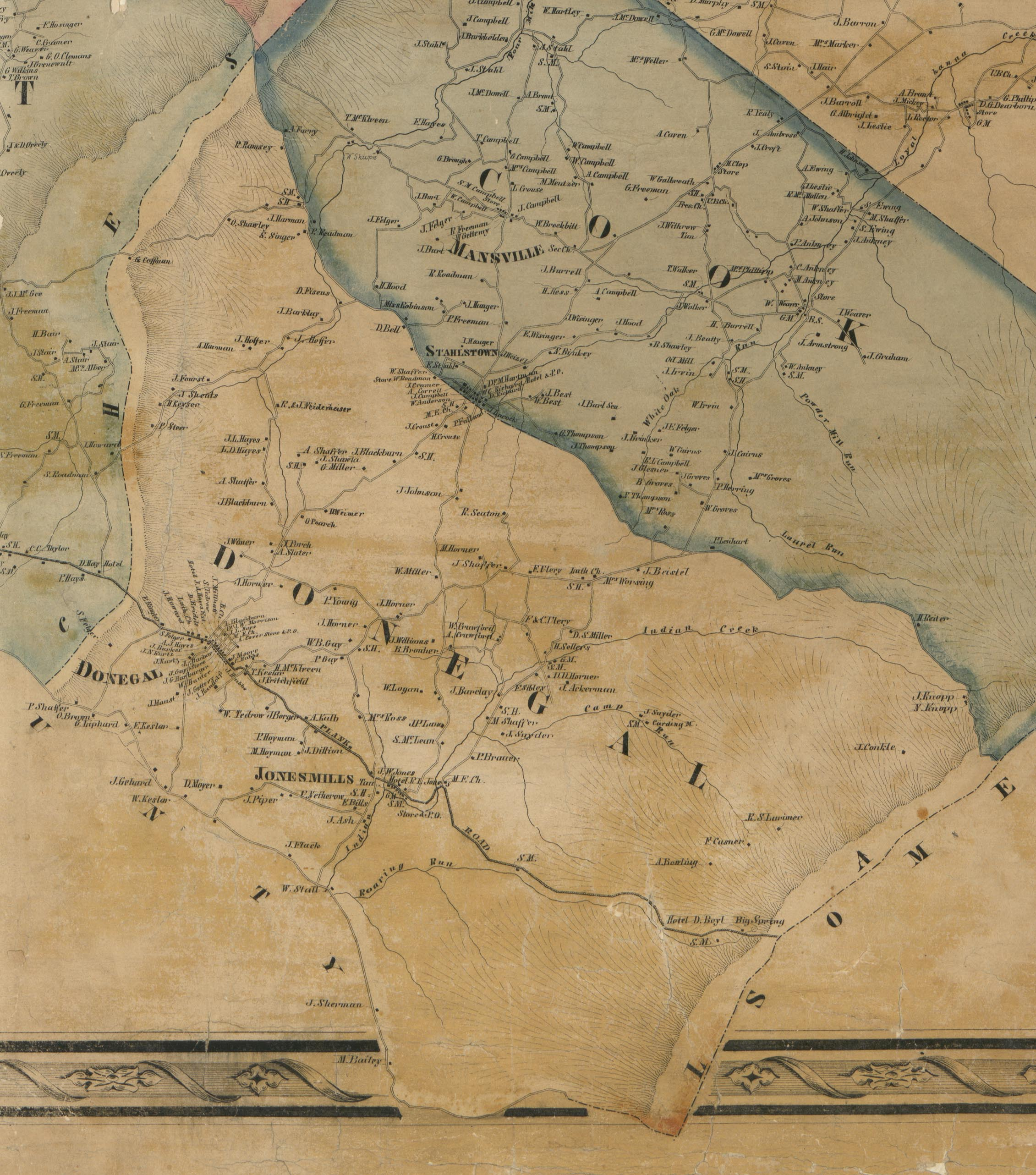
Donegal Township, Westmoreland County, Pennsylvania, 1857

According to the United States Census Bureau, the township has a total area of 49.2 square miles (127 km^{2}), of which 49.1 square miles (127 km^{2}) is land and 0.1 square miles (0.26 km^{2}) (0.26%) is water.

The township is located on the west slope of Laurel Ridge mountain. It includes the following communities: Franklin, Hopewell, Horners Mill, Jones Mills, Kregar, and Myersbrook. Donegal Township surrounds, but does not include, the borough of Donegal, which is a separate municipality. The township is bordered by Mount Pleasant Township to the northwest, Cook Township to the northeast, Somerset County to the southeast, and Fayette County to the southwest.

Within the township are:

- Roaring Run Natural Area, a publicly owned, 3,593-acre preserve maintained by the Pennsylvania Department of Conservation and Natural Resources. It includes hiking trails and a portion of Forbes State Forest.
- Donegal Lake, a 90-acre reservoir fed by Fourmile Run. Owned by the Commonwealth of Pennsylvania, it is available to the public for fishing and boating.

Laurel Hill Tunnel, an abandoned tunnel on the Pennsylvania Turnpike, is adjacent to the eastern boundary of Donegal Township.

== History ==
Donegal was one of the original townships established in Westmoreland County in 1773. According to historian John Boucher, its original boundaries were much larger, constituting the majority of the Ligonier valley and extending into what is now Fayette County. Boucher states that "the village" of Donegal was incorporated in 1867.

== Demographics ==
Historical population
Census	Pop.	Note	%±
2000	2,442		—
2010	2,403		−1.6%
2020	2,192		−8.8%
U.S. Decennial Census

At the 2000 census there were 2,442 people, 950 households, and 691 families living in the township. The population density was 49.7 inhabitants per square mile (19.2/km^{2}). There were 1,207 housing units at an average density of 24.6/sq mi (9.5/km^{2}). The racial makeup of the township was 99.26% White, 0.12% African American, 0.04% Asian, 0.20% from other races, and 0.37% from two or more races. Hispanic or Latino of any race were 0.74%.

Of the 950 households 29.7% had children under the age of 18 living with them, 61.5% were married couples living together, 6.5% had a female householder with no husband present, and 27.2% were non-families. 24.6% of households were one person and 10.9% were one person aged 65 or older. The average household size was 2.47 and the average family size was 2.90.

The age distribution was 22.5% under the age of 18, 6.3% from 18 to 24, 28.8% from 25 to 44, 26.2% from 45 to 64, and 16.1% 65 or older. The median age was 41 years. For every 100 females, there were 105.0 males. For every 100 females age 18 and over, there were 106.9 males.

The median household income was $29,741 and the median family income was $33,750. Males had a median income of $29,196 versus $25,529 for females. The per capita income for the township was $14,764. About 8.0% of families and 12.1% of the population were below the poverty line, including 12.3% of those under age 18 and 12.1% of those age 65 or over.

== Industry ==
Logging was a major industry in Donegal Township in the early 1900s. In 1906 the Indian Creek Valley Railroad was built along Indian Creek to Jones Mills to transport the logged timber. It later hauled coal from mines in the area. Logging also took place in the mid-1960s.

LTC Energy's Rustic Ridge No. 1 coal mine is located beneath Donegal Township and neighboring Saltlick Township.
