= Mount Pleasant Area School District =

School district in Pennsylvania

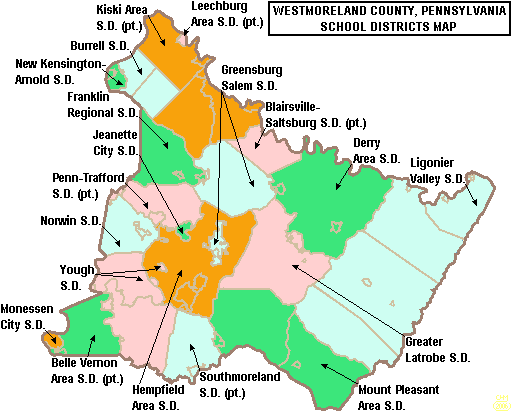

Address
- 271 State Street Mount Pleasant, Westmoreland County, Pennsylvania, 15666; United States

District information
- Type: Public
- Grades: K-12
- Superintendent: Timothy M. Gabauer

Students and staff
- District mascot: Vikings
- Colors: Red, White, and Blue

Other information
- Website: www.mpasd.net

Mount Pleasant School District is a public school district in Westmoreland County, Pennsylvania. The district encompasses the southeastern portion of the county. The boroughs of Mount Pleasant and Donegal, as well as the townships of Mount Pleasant and Donegal are within district boundaries.

== Schools ==
There are two K-6 Elementary Schools (Donegal and Norvelt). Students in Mount Pleasant Borough in Grades K-1 attend Rumbaugh Elementary School and Ramsay Elementary for Grades 2-6. All district students in grades 7-12 attend the Mount Pleasant Area Junior/Senior High School, located outside of Mount Pleasant.

=== Elementary schools ===
- Donegal Elementary School, located on Schoolhouse Road in Donegal Township, was built in 1958 to accommodate students from the former Donegal and Jones Mills Schools. When the school first opened, it served grades K-8. In 1974, Junior High students were sent to the High School Complex. Classrooms were added later on. As of 2022 Donegal Elementary School is grades K-4.
- Norvelt Elementary School, located in the WPA community of Norvelt in Mount Pleasant Township, was built in 1936. Norvelt is a K-3 Elementary School.
- Ramsay Elementary School served as a Junior High School until ?, when it became an elementary school. In 1993, it then became the current Grade 2-6 facility for students living in Mount Pleasant Borough. The school is located on Eagle Street. As of 2022, Ramsay is grades 4-6.
- Rumbaugh Elementary School is a Grade K-1 Elementary school, located on the eastern edge of Mount Pleasant Borough. The school is named after Lloyd Rumbaugh, a former district superintendent. Rumbaugh is no longer in operation.
