= Donegal, Pennsylvania =

Borough in Pennsylvania, US

- Borough
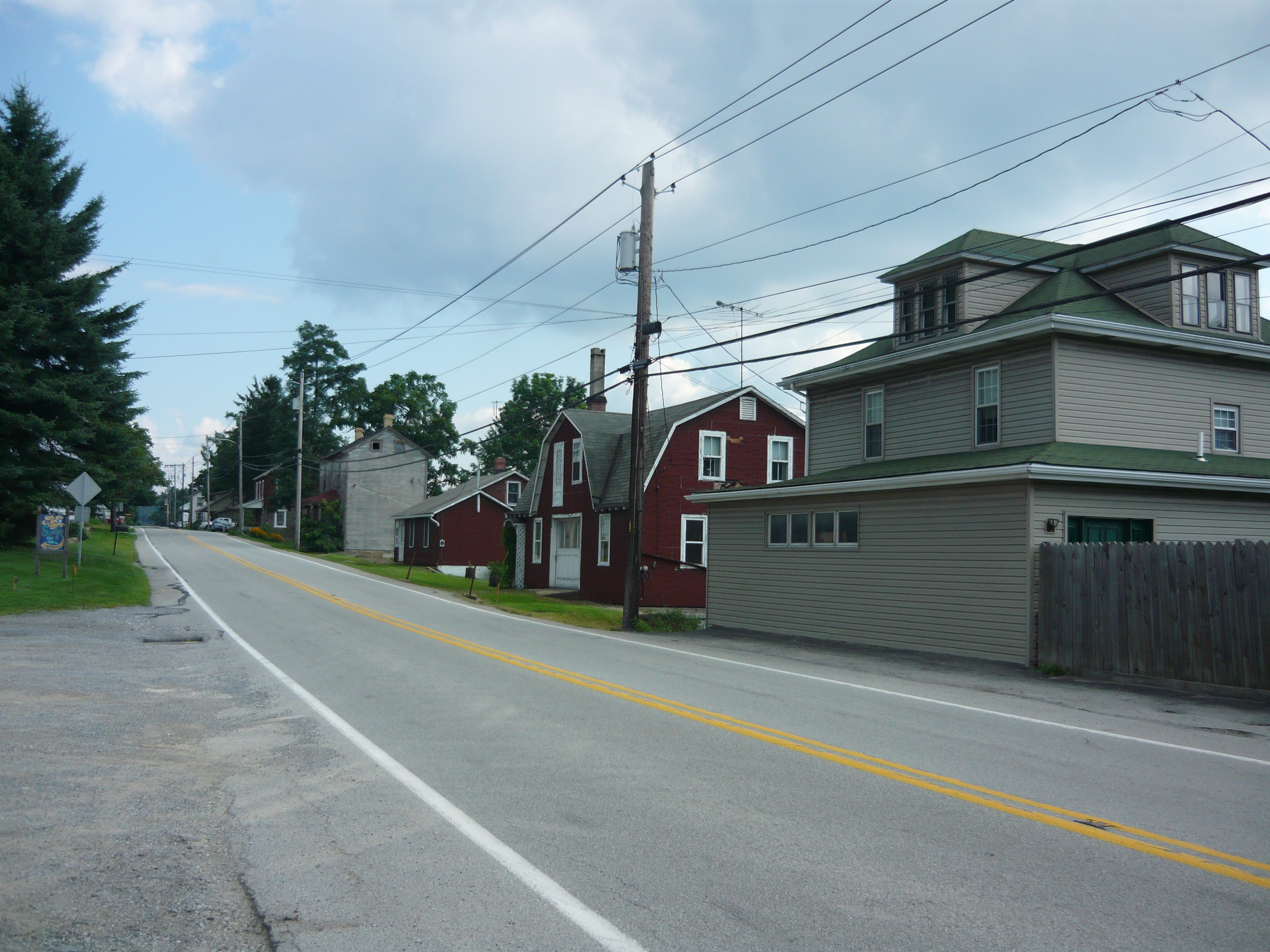
- Main Street

- Location of Donegal in Westmoreland County, Pennsylvania.

- Location within Pennsylvania
- Coordinates: 40°06′42″N 79°22′55″W
- Country: United States
- State: Pennsylvania
- County: Westmoreland
- Settled: 1796
- Incorporated: August 20, 1867

Government
  - Type: Borough Council

Area
  - Total: 0.23 sq mi (0.59 km^{2})
  - Land: 0.23 sq mi (0.59 km^{2})
  - Water: 0 sq mi (0.00 km^{2})
- Elevation: 1,834 ft (559 m)

Population (2020)
  - Total: 102
  - Density: 449.0/sq mi (173.37/km^{2})
- Time zone: UTC-5 (Eastern (EST))
  - Summer (DST): UTC-4 (EDT)
- Zip code: 15628
- FIPS code: 42-19472

There are also three Donegal Townships in Pennsylvania.

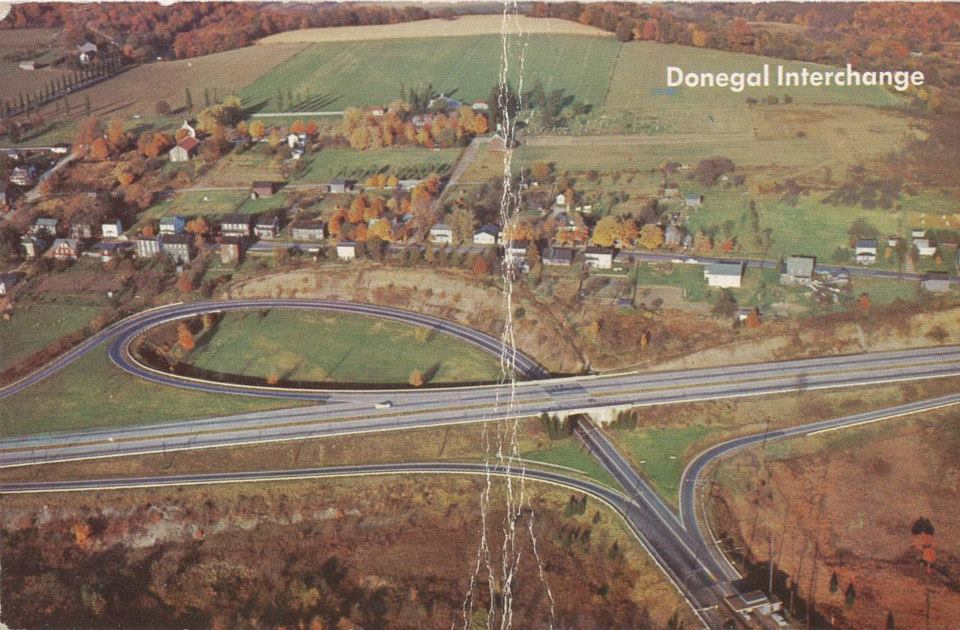
PA Turnpike at Donegal, PA, 1959.

Donegal is a borough in Westmoreland County, Pennsylvania, United States. It is a distinct municipality from the adjacent Donegal Township. The population was 103 at the 2020 census. Donegal is best known as an exit on the Pennsylvania Turnpike with restaurants, gas stations, and two hotels for travelers.

It was named after the town and county of Donegal in Ireland.

== Geography ==
Donegal is located at 40°6′42″N 79°22′55″W (40.111789, -79.381931).

According to the United States Census Bureau, the borough has a total area of 0.3 square miles (0.78 km^{2}), all land.

=== Climate ===
Climate data for Donegal 2 NW, Pennsylvania (1991–2020 normals, extremes 1943–present)
Month	Jan	Feb	Mar	Apr	May	Jun	Jul	Aug	Sep	Oct	Nov	Dec	Year
Record high °F (°C)	72 (22)	75 (24)	82 (28)	90 (32)	92 (33)	95 (35)	98 (37)	98 (37)	96 (36)	86 (30)	80 (27)	74 (23)	98 (37)
Mean daily maximum °F (°C)	35.2 (1.8)	39.3 (4.1)	47.3 (8.5)	60.4 (15.8)	69.7 (20.9)	77.4 (25.2)	80.6 (27.0)	79.4 (26.3)	73.7 (23.2)	62.9 (17.2)	50.5 (10.3)	40.8 (4.9)	59.8 (15.4)
Daily mean °F (°C)	27.2 (−2.7)	29.8 (−1.2)	36.8 (2.7)	48.7 (9.3)	58.5 (14.7)	66.6 (19.2)	70.1 (21.2)	69.1 (20.6)	62.7 (17.1)	51.8 (11.0)	41.3 (5.2)	32.7 (0.4)	49.6 (9.8)
Mean daily minimum °F (°C)	19.2 (−7.1)	20.2 (−6.6)	26.3 (−3.2)	37.0 (2.8)	47.4 (8.6)	55.9 (13.3)	59.7 (15.4)	58.8 (14.9)	51.7 (10.9)	40.7 (4.8)	32.0 (0.0)	24.5 (−4.2)	39.4 (4.1)
Record low °F (°C)	−22 (−30)	−20 (−29)	−13 (−25)	8 (−13)	16 (−9)	28 (−2)	35 (2)	32 (0)	22 (−6)	9 (−13)	−6 (−21)	−14 (−26)	−22 (−30)
Average precipitation inches (mm)	4.95 (126)	3.50 (89)	3.66 (93)	4.08 (104)	4.71 (120)	4.91 (125)	4.63 (118)	4.16 (106)	3.87 (98)	3.31 (84)	3.67 (93)	4.65 (118)	50.10 (1,273)
Source: NOAA

== Demographics ==
Historical population
Census	Pop.	Note	%±
1870	192		—
1880	183		−4.7%
1890	163		−10.9%
1900	157		−3.7%
1910	147		−6.4%
1920	132		−10.2%
1930	163		23.5%
1940	258		58.3%
1950	198		−23.3%
1960	216		9.1%
1970	255		18.1%
1980	212		−16.9%
1990	212		0.0%
2000	165		−22.2%
2010	120		−27.3%
2020	102		−15.0%
2021 (est.)	102	Steady	0.0%

As of the census of 2000, there were 165 people, 72 households, and 47 families residing in the borough. The population density was 519.1 inhabitants per square mile (200.4/km^{2}). There were 79 housing units at an average density of 248.5 per square mile (95.9/km^{2}). The racial makeup of the borough was 98.79% White, and 1.21% from two or more races.

There were 72 households, out of which 26.4% had children under the age of 18 living with them, 54.2% were married couples living together, 9.7% had a female householder with no husband present, and 34.7% were non-families. 29.2% of all households were made up of individuals, and 9.7% had someone living alone who was 65 years of age or older. The average household size was 2.29 and the average family size was 2.83.

In the borough the population was spread out, with 21.8% under the age of 18, 10.3% from 18 to 24, 24.8% from 25 to 44, 27.3% from 45 to 64, and 15.8% who were 65 years of age or older. The median age was 41 years. For every 100 females, there were 81.3 males. For every 100 females age 18 and over, there were 81.7 males.

The median income for a household in the borough was $23,875, and the median income for a family was $25,417. Males had a median income of $32,000 versus $13,958 for females. The per capita income for the borough was $12,656. About 21.1% of families and 20.0% of the population were below the poverty line, including 18.9% of those under the age of eighteen and 17.1% of those 65 or over.

== Education ==
Donegal has an elementary school for its children and for the children of several other area communities. As part of the Mount Pleasant Area School District, older students attend Mount Pleasant Area Junior/Senior High School.

== Attractions ==
Donegal Township is home to a busy turnpike exchange that sees thousands of people every year. Most travelers are on their way to one of the many local attractions. Two of the main attractions are the 7 Springs Ski Resort and Hidden Valley Ski Resort. These resorts provide a steady winter income for many local businesses. There are also several Frank Lloyd Wright-designed homes within driving distance that can be toured, such as The Duncan House, Kentuck Knob, and Fallingwater. Fallingwater is located near Ohiopyle State Park, which offers a range of opportunities for outdoor recreation.

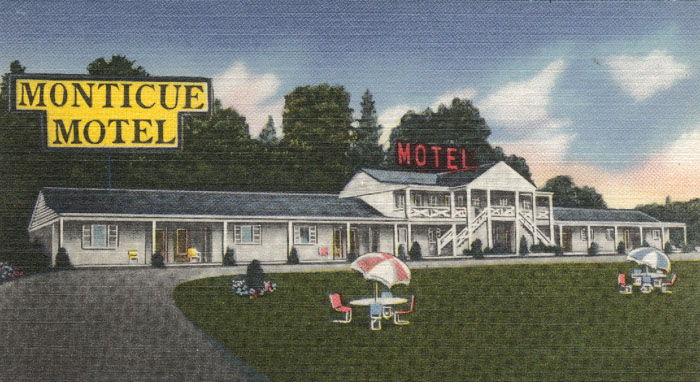
A post card of Monticue's Motel in Donegal, 1954
