= Laurel Ridge State Park =

State park in Pennsylvania, United States

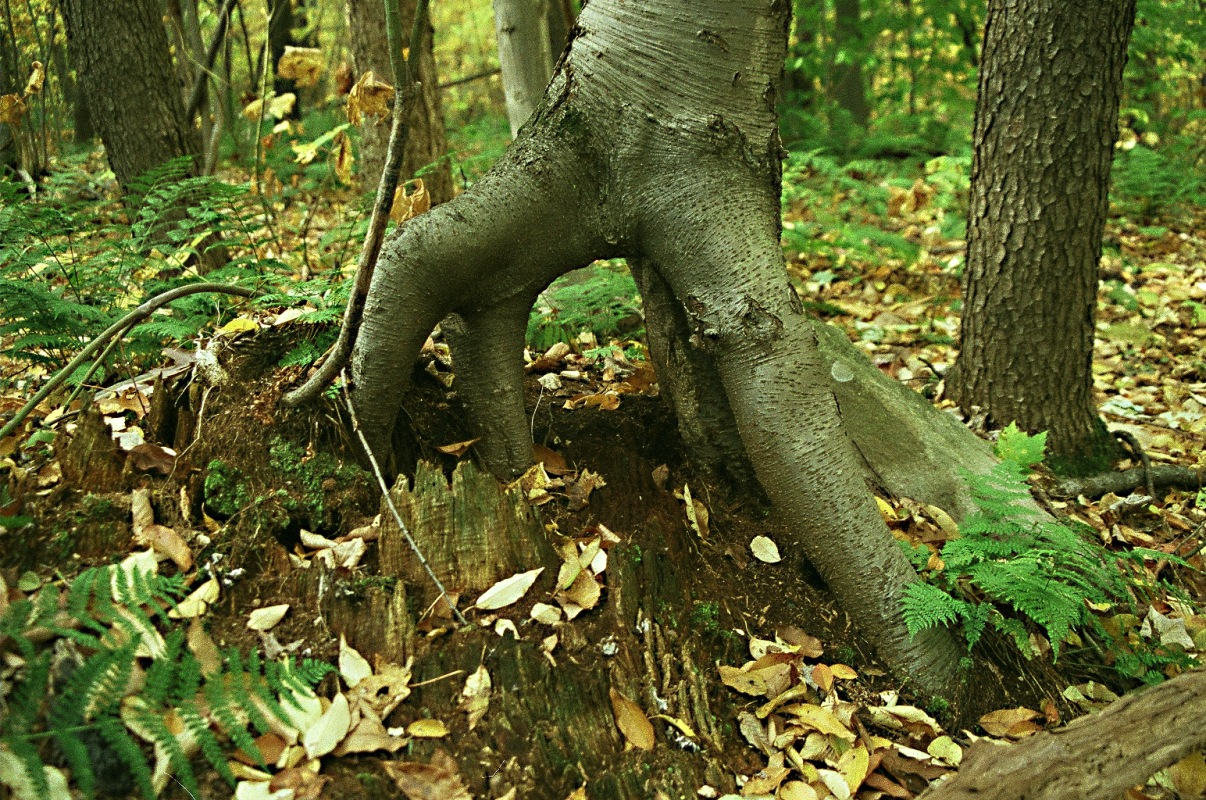
- One tree grows from the rotting stump of another at Laurel Ridge State Park

- Location within Pennsylvania Location within the United States
- Interactive map of Laurel Ridge State Park
- Location: Cambria, Fayette, Somerset, and Westmoreland counties, Pennsylvania, United States
- Coordinates: 40°24′31″N 79°00′20″W (Northern Terminus)
- Area: 13,625 acres (5,514 ha)
- Established: 1967
- Administrator: Pennsylvania Department of Conservation and Natural Resources
- Website: Official website
- Pennsylvania State Parks

Laurel Ridge State Park is a 13,625-acre (5,514 ha) Pennsylvania state park that with parcels in Cambria, Fayette, Somerset, and Westmoreland counties, Pennsylvania in the United States.

== History and location ==
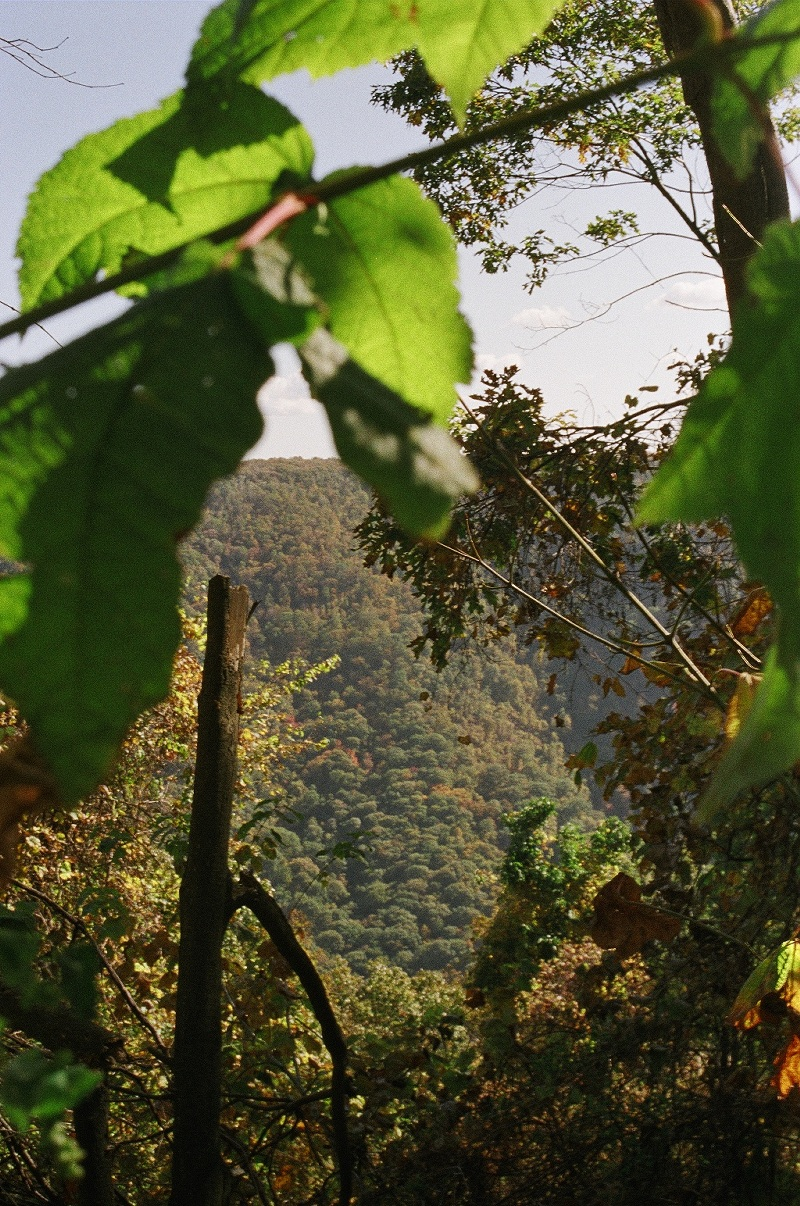
View across the Conemaugh Gorge from the Laurel Ridge Trail.

The park is made up of several non-contiguous tracts, separated by various state game lands and state forest districts, on top of the Laurel Hill geologic formation. The park was approved by Pennsylvania Governor Raymond P. Shafer on July 10, 1967. The park lies within the Appalachian mixed mesophytic forests ecoregion.

Much of the 70-mile Laurel Highlands Hiking Trail travels through Laurel Ridge State Park. That trail begins at Ohiopyle State Park to the southwest and reaches Conemaugh Gorge near Johnstown. All of that trail's overnight shelter areas are within the grounds of the state park. Uniquely among Pennsylvania hiking trails, that trail is protected as a linear state park, coordinated by personnel at Laurel Ridge State Park.

== Recreation ==
In addition to hiking, the park is open to hunting, cross-country skiing, and snowmobiling. Hunting is permitted on almost all of Laurel Ridge State Park. The most common game species are ruffed grouse, turkey and white-tailed deer. The hunting of groundhogs is prohibited. Hunters are expected to follow the rules and regulations of the Pennsylvania Game Commission.

There are 35 miles (56 km) of trails open to cross-country skiing during the winter months at Laurel Ridge State Park and over 70 miles (110 km) of trails open to snow mobiles.
