= Linn Run State Park =

State park in Westmoreland County, Pennsylvania

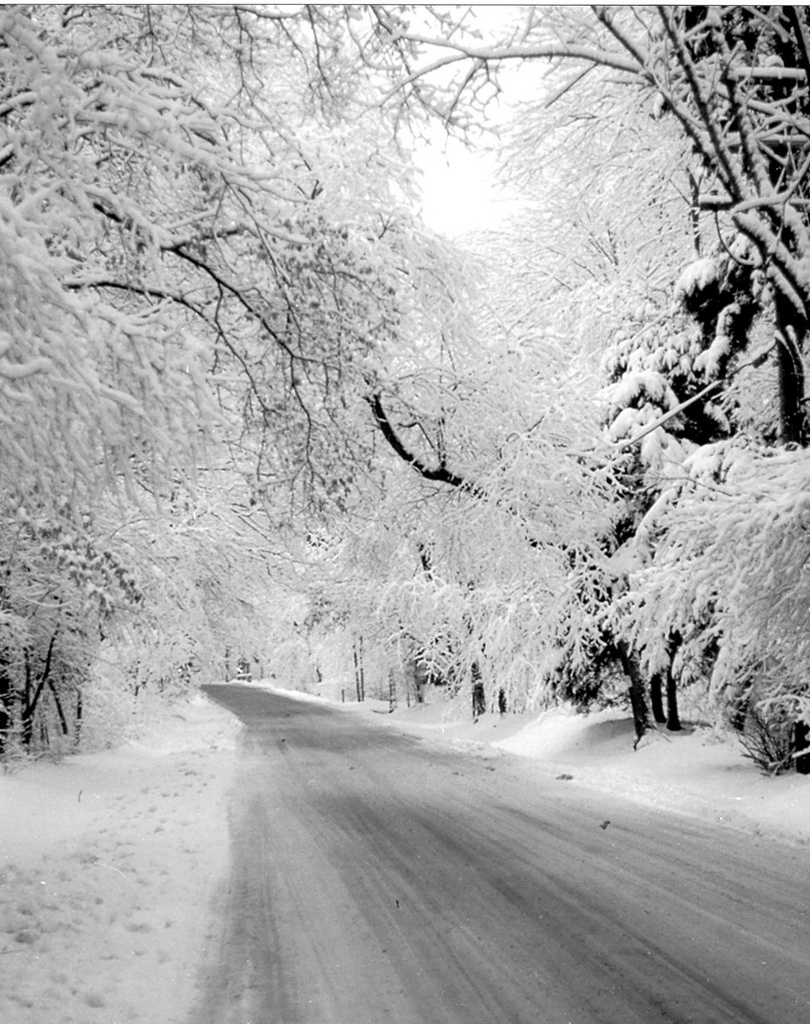

- Location within Pennsylvania Location within the United States
- Interactive map of Linn Run State Park
- Location: Westmoreland County, Pennsylvania, United States
- Coordinates: 40°09′15″N 79°12′48″W
- Area: 612 acres (248 ha)
- Elevation: 1,798 feet (548 m)
- Established: 1909
- Administrator: Pennsylvania Department of Conservation and Natural Resources
- Website: Official website
- Pennsylvania State Parks
- Linn Run State Park Family Cabin District
- U.S. National Register of Historic Places
- U.S. Historic district
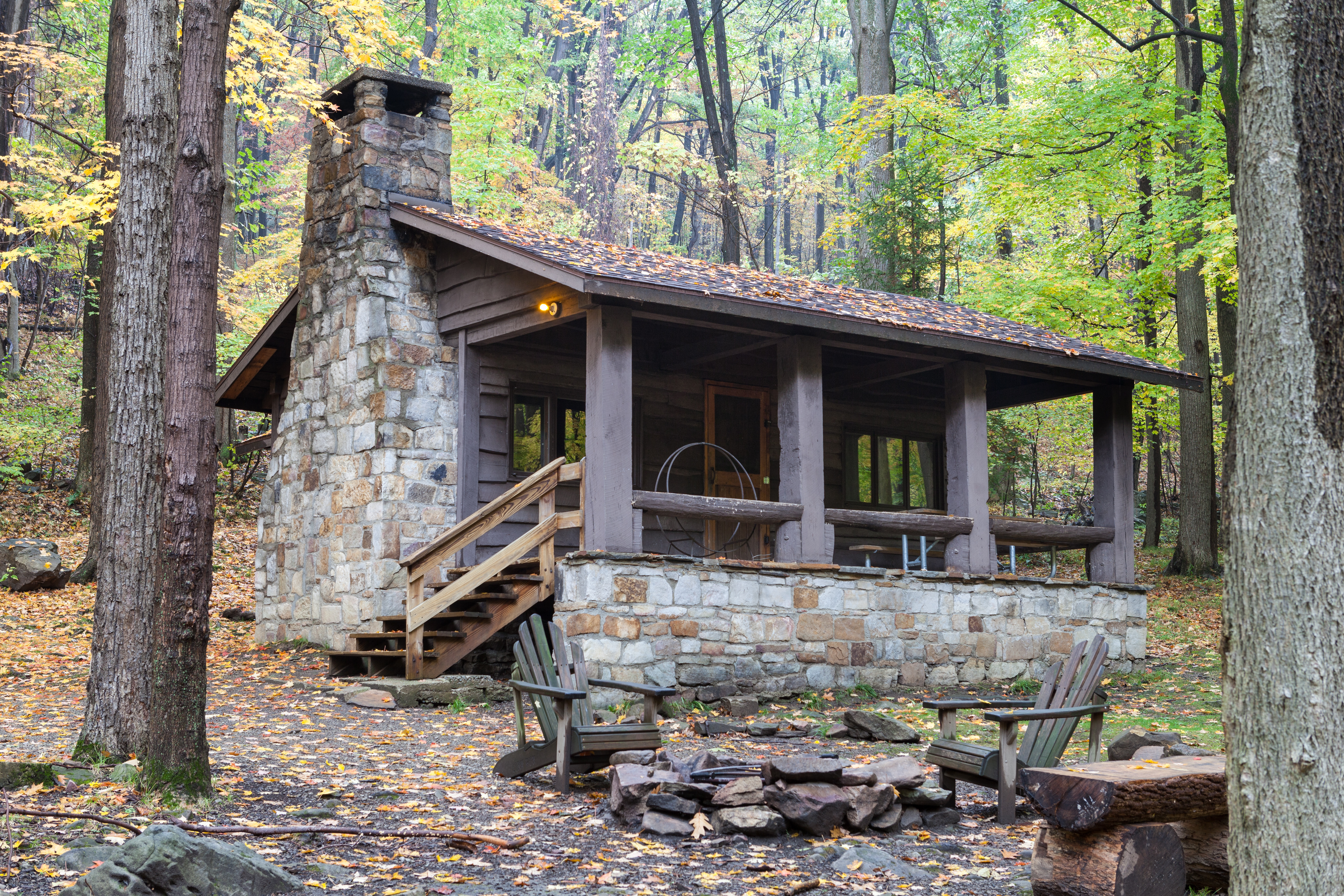
- Cabin #9
- Nearest city: Cook Township
- Coordinates: 40°9′14″N 79°13′00″W
- Area: 13.5 acres (5.5 ha)
- Built: 1933
- MPS: Emergency Conservation Work (ECW) Architecture in Pennsylvania State Parks: 1933-1942, TR
- NRHP reference No.: 87000107
- Added to NRHP: February 12, 1987

Linn Run State Park is a Pennsylvania state park on 612 acres (248 ha) in Cook and Ligonier Townships, Westmoreland County, Pennsylvania in the United States. The park borders Forbes State Forest. Two smaller streams, Grove Run and Rock Run, join in Linn Run State Park to form Linn Run which has a waterfall, Adams Falls, which can be seen at the park. This state park is just off Pennsylvania Route 381 near the small town of Rector.

== History ==
The ridges of the Allegheny Mountains had once been covered with old-growth forest. These forests were clear cut during the mid-to-late 19th century and early 20th century. The Byers and Allen Lumber Company clear cut the forest that is now Linn Run State Park in the 1890s. Lumbermen took logs to the sawmill where they were cut into lumber. Smaller logs were used to reinforce the mine shafts of the many coal mines throughout southwestern Pennsylvania and West Virginia. The bark of the hemlock tree was used as a source of tannin at the tanneries of the area. The treetops were left behind and dried. Steam locomotives of the Pittsburgh, Westmoreland and Somerset Railroad passing through would ignite this dry brush, causing massive wildfires that swept through the mountains and valleys.

In 1909, the Commonwealth of Pennsylvania purchased the land from the Byers and Allen Lumber Company. At the time, the land was devoid of timber and wildlife, making it the first major public purchase of denuded forest land in the Ohio River Basin. In his first report in 1909, Forester John R. Williams wrote,

"I should say that fully three-fifths (60%) of the reserve had been burned since the lumbering was done. The fires did great damage to the young growth. Some places were covered with nothing but ferns and blackberry bushes."

Scars from these fires can still be seen today in the Linn Run area.

Most of the wildlife in the area was devastated due to the destruction of their habitat or over hunting. White-tailed deer were imported from Michigan and New York to reestablish what had once been a thriving population of deer. These deer were released throughout Pennsylvania in 1910.

During the New Deal era, the park was further developed by the Civilian Conservation Corps and Works Progress Administration. A Civilian Conservation Corps camp operated in the park from 1933 to 1942. Ten rustic cabins, stone fireplaces, and several buildings and bridges were constructed, along with roads, water and sewage systems, and utilities.

Today, the area in and around Linn Run State Park is a second growth forest.

== Recreation ==
=== Hiking Trails ===
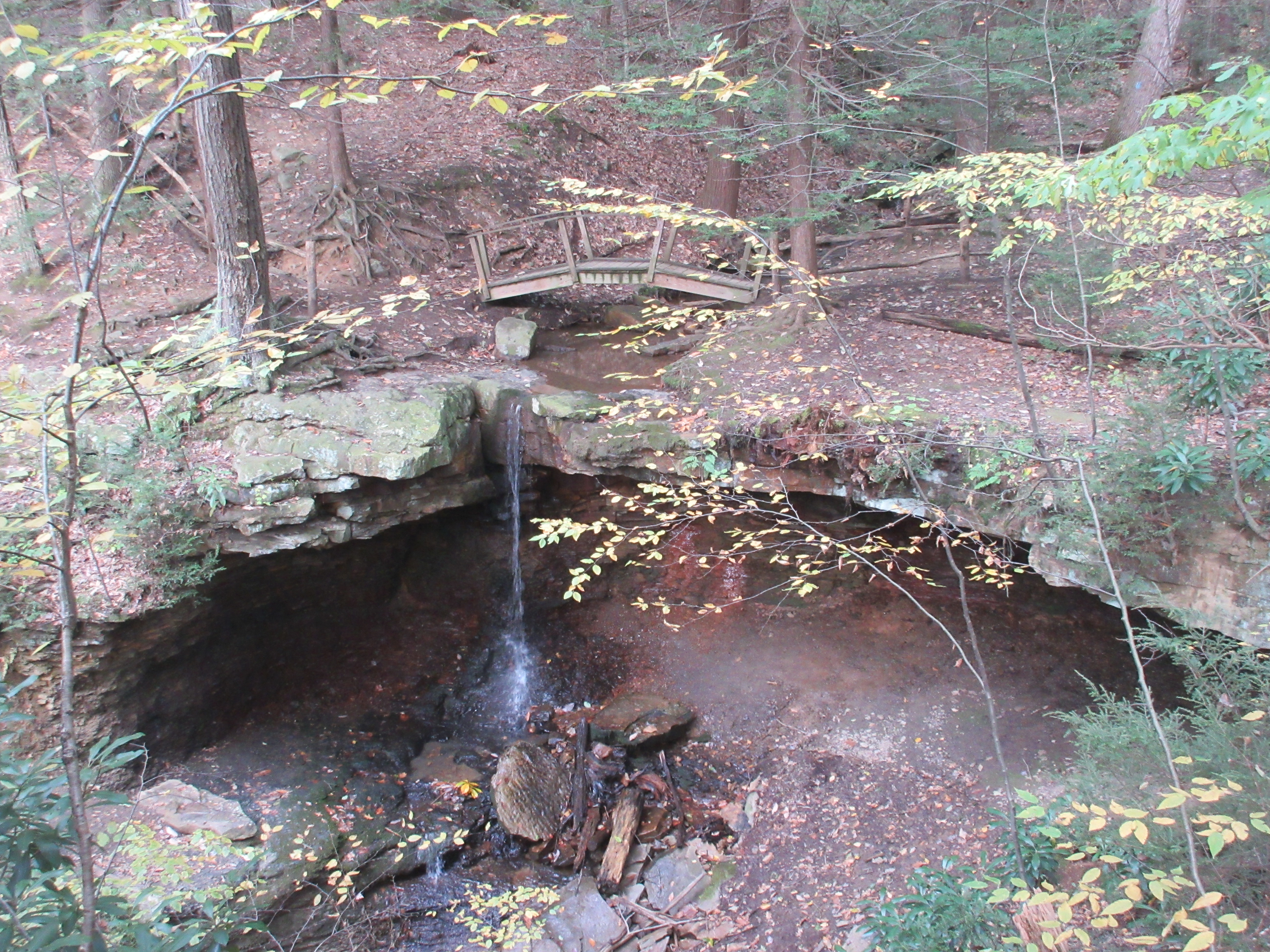
Except following periods of heavy rain, only a small amount of water crests the 15-foot Adams Falls.

All trails at the park are open to hiking. Mountain biking and snowmobiling are not permitted on the hiking trails.

- Adams Falls Trail is 1.0 mile (1.6 km) and passes Adams Falls. The trail is very rocky and goes by several large boulders. The waterfall is surrounded a stand of hemlock with overhanging rhododendron.
- Iscrupe Trail is 0.75 miles (1.21 km) and follows the original Linn Run Road, ending at the Adams Falls Picnic Area.
- Flat Rock Trail is 0.5 miles (0.80 km) and ends at a large, smooth rock on the banks of Linn Run.
- Grove Run Trail is a looping 4.0 miles (6.4 km) long behind the Grove Run Picnic Area. It becomes progressively steeper as is passes along Grove Run.

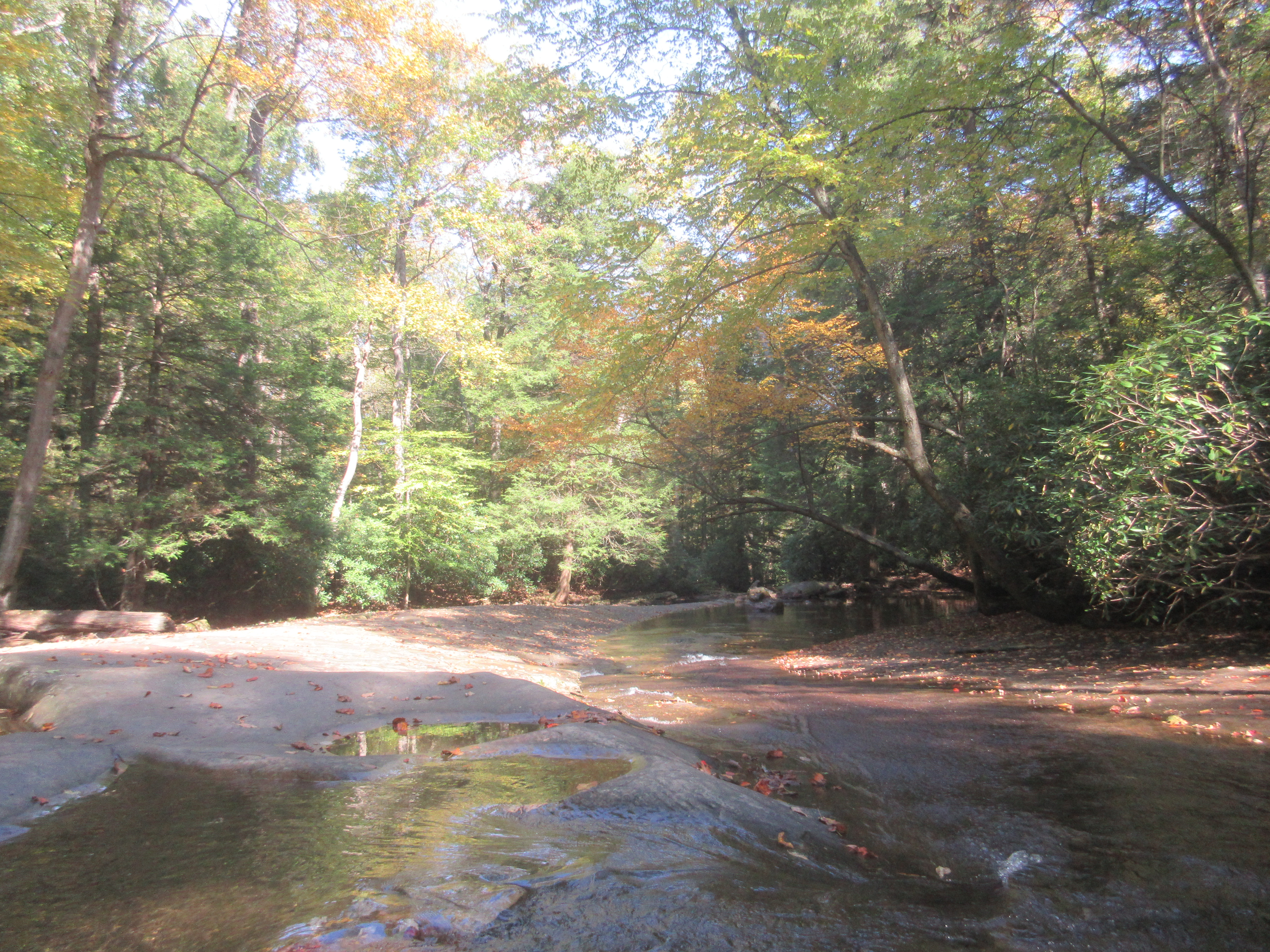
The creek travels parallel to the Flat Rock Trail.

=== Hunting and fishing ===
Hunting is permitted on about 400 acres (160 ha) of Linn Run State Park. The most common game species are squirrels, turkey and white-tailed deer. The hunting of groundhogs is prohibited. Hunters are expected to follow the rules and regulations of the Pennsylvania Game Commission. Linn Run is a trout fishery with stocked trout and native brook trout.

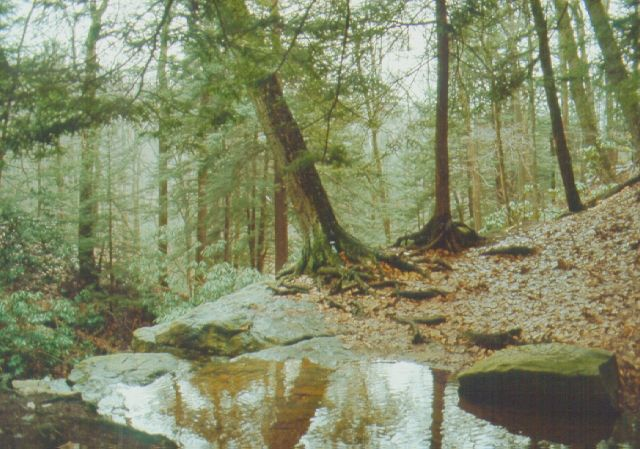
View of Linn Run.

=== Picnics ===
Linn Run State Park has long been a popular destination for families and church groups for picnicking. There are two main picnic areas at the park. Adams Falls Picnic Area is near Adams Falls. It has a selection of picnic tables, a pavilion, playground and modern restrooms. Grove Run Picnic Area is near Grove Run. It lacks a pavilion but otherwise has the same facilities at the Adams Falls Picnic Area.

=== Cabins ===
The cabin area has been designated as the Linn Run State Park Family Cabin District and is listed on the National Register of Historic Places. The older cabins, dating back to 1933, were constructed by the Civilian Conservation Corps during the Great Depression in an architectural style known as WPA Rustic.

There are ten cabins at Linn Run State Park. Only one of them is modern with a kitchen and bathroom. The other nine cabins are rustic, meaning that there is no indoor plumbing, but they do have basic furniture (bed, table, chairs) as well as wood-burning stoves, electricity, a refrigerator, oven, stove and microwave. Each rustic cabin has an outhouse and water pump. There is a modern bathhouse in the area of the cabins.
