= Acme, Pennsylvania =

Unincorporated community in Pennsylvania, US

- Unincorporated Community
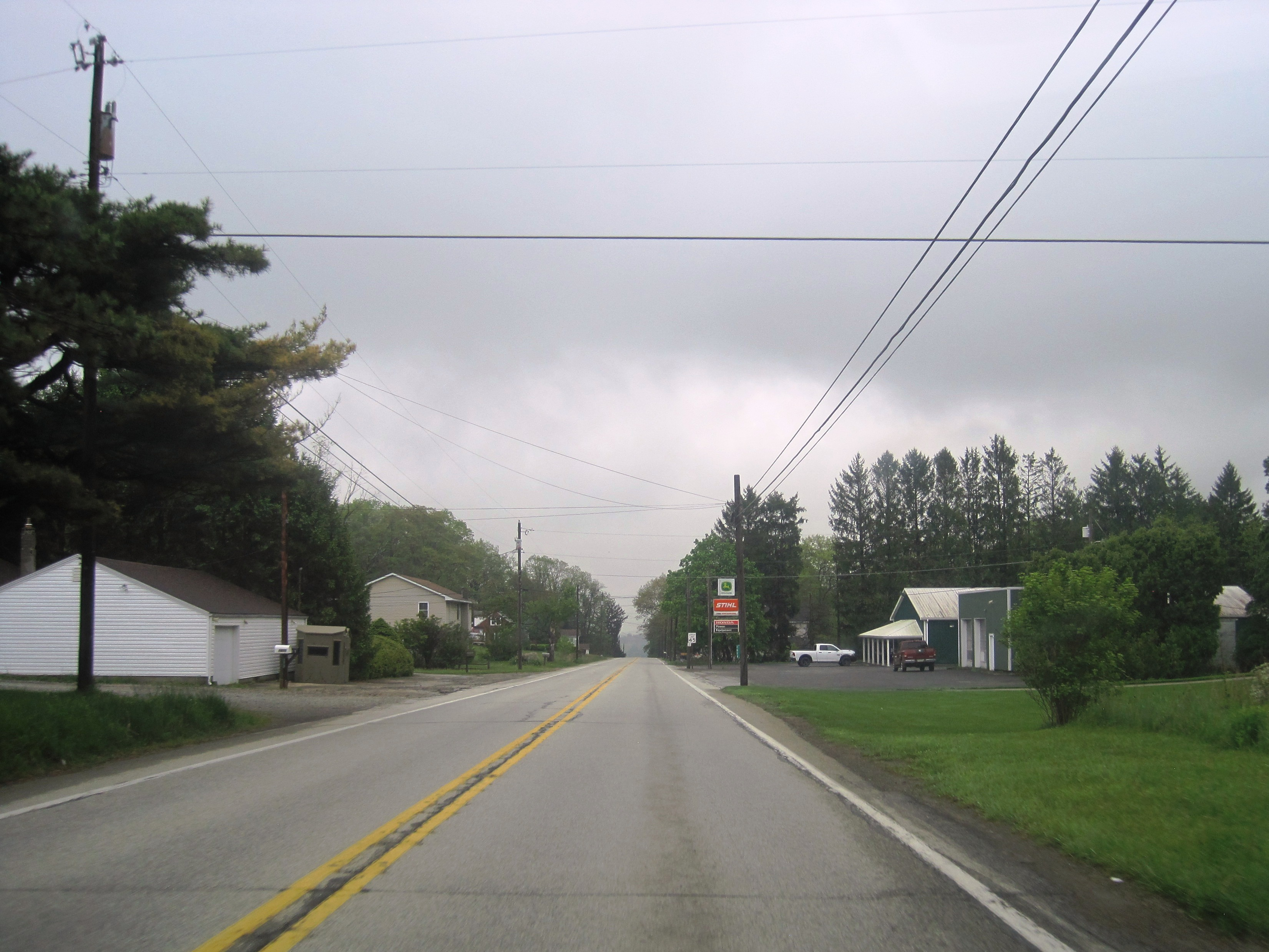
- Eastbound PA 31 in Acme
- Etymology: "acme," meaning the "peak" or the "top"
- Location of Acme in Pennsylvania Acme, Pennsylvania (the United States)
- Coordinates: 40°7′38″N 79°26′5″W
- Country: United States
- State: Pennsylvania
- Townships: Donegal Township, Westmoreland County; Mount Pleasant Township, Westmoreland County; Bullskin Township, Fayette County
- Time zone: UTC-4 (EST)
  - Summer (DST): UTC-5 (EDT)
- ZIP code: 15610
- Area code: 724
- identified by ZIP code 15610,

Acme is an unincorporated community in Donegal, Mount Pleasant and Bullskin townships in Pennsylvania, United States. The Acme ZIP code of 15610 extends well beyond the more densely populated part of the area, into rural parts of Donegal Township in Westmoreland County and Bullskin Township in Fayette County.

== Geography ==
Acme is located in Donegal Township and Mount Pleasant Township, in southern Westmoreland County, and in Bullskin Township in the northeastern corner of Fayette County at 40°7′38″N 79°26′5″W (40.12731, -79.434929).

The name "Acme" refers to the area's location atop Chestnut Ridge in the Allegheny Mountains.

== Surrounding communities ==
- Donegal (east)
- Stahlstown (northeast)
- Kecksburg (north)
- Laurelville (west)
- Saltlick Township (south)

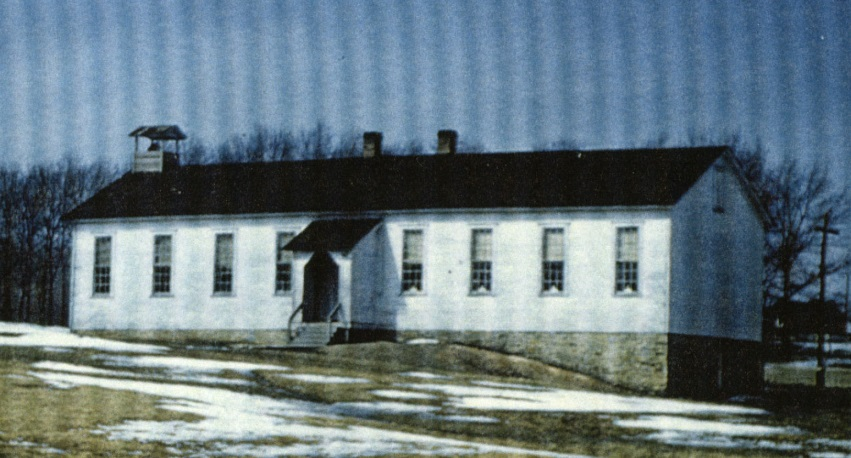
Acme Community Center

== History ==
Acme has always been an agricultural community; however, three attempts to develop resorts in the area have likely been inspired by its gateway position along the edge of the Laurel Highlands.

=== Treetops & Mountain Circles/Polymath Park ===
In 1962, architect Peter Berndtson developed a master plan for a 125-acre (0.51 km^{2}) property named Treetops & Mountain Circles. Berndtson, an original apprentice of Frank Lloyd Wright, designed a network of twenty-four private houses, each within a 300-foot (91 m) diameter clearing in the woods. If completed, the clearings and their connecting roads would have depicted a bunch of grapes when viewed from the sky. Only two homes—those for developers Harry Blum and James Balter—were actually built.

Forty-two years later, local homebuilder Thomas D. Papinchak deconstructed the Donald C. Duncan House in Lisle, Illinois (a suburb of Chicago) and relocated it to the Acme property. The Duncan House was designed by Wright as an instance of his Usonian style. In 2019, a second Wright house, R. W. Lindholm Residence, was relocated from Cloquet, Minnesota and opened to the public. In honor of the two architects, the failed development has been renamed Polymath Park Resort. All four houses have been offered as overnight accommodations for visitors to Wright's Fallingwater and Kentuck Knob in nearby Stewart Township.

=== Bear Rocks ===
On November 7, 1965, Pittsburgh real-estate developer Scott Hamilton advertised Bear Rocks, a new "Mountain Ski Area", in the Pittsburgh Press newspaper. The development in a section of forest originally known as Southerwood, along the western descent of Chestnut Ridge, featured over 1000 house lots in a wooded setting connected by 22 miles of roads. Codes prevented the cutting of more trees than necessary for home construction, unconnected buildings, business restrictions, prohibitions on brick and metal siding and similar provisions intended to maintain the rural character of the development. Two separate lodge buildings were built; one at the upper entrance to the development and another at the base of the ski slopes. At its peak, the Bear Rocks Ski area featured eight slopes and trails with a double-chair lift and snow-making equipment. The advertisement also boasted a private fishing lake, "magnificent" swimming pool, rustic cocktail lounge, tennis, horseback riding, social activities, and "golf at a private country club nearby."

Bear Rocks reportedly ceased ski operations after the 1973 season. The ski lodge and restaurant burned to the ground a few years later and was not rebuilt, however the community lodge remains as a focal point for residents. The community continues to grow, and new homes have been constructed in the clearings of the former ski slopes and continue to be built on vacant lots. While the rustic character of the development is still very evident, it has suffered somewhat in recent years as the Bear Rocks codes have been increasingly ignored, including the clear-cutting of lots, and some logging operations.

=== Forest Lake ===
Following in the footsteps of the very successful Bear Rocks, this much smaller resort featured a recreational lake, a spring fed swimming pool, and wooded house lots. Forest Lake is situated on the majestic Chestnut Ridge, along Bear Rocks Road. As part of the original sales promotion, a red caboose, now decayed and unrecognizable, was placed on what is now one of the adjoining properties. Forest Lake never enjoyed the success of its larger neighbor and only five houses were built. On what is now a small adjacent lot, a Tudor house was built over one of the sample roadside A-framed houses. In 1990, a local real estate investor purchased the tract consisting of the entire impoundment of Forest Lake, along with the encompassing 56 choice acres of original resort property that spans the eastern edge of Bear Rocks. Today the tranquil property, now known as Forest Lake Farm, is maintained as a private resort residence for a select few.

== Government ==
An unincorporated place, Acme is within Mount Pleasant Township.

== Transportation ==
Pennsylvania Route 31, a two-lane artery, runs east and west through the center of Acme. The Pennsylvania Turnpike parallels the state road to the north, with the closest interchange in Donegal, 2.5 miles (4.0 km) to the southeast. Because Turnpike traffic is occasionally diverted to the state route, additional lanes were added to accommodate truck traffic down the latter's western descent of the Allegheny Mountains, on a 2-mile (3 km) stretch of highway known as Three Mile Hill.

== Recreation and amenities ==
Chestnut Ridge Park features a 25-acre (100,000 m^{2}) recreational pool (lake) with a boat launch and short walking trail. The county park provides opportunity for fishing, hunting and other outdoor activities in a quiet, isolated rural setting.

Acme Speedway hosts kart racing every Saturday night from mid-April through late September.

Donegal Highlands, an 18-hole public golf course, offers a challenge to golfers of all abilities.

Stone Villa Wine Cellars provides seasonal outdoor entertainment as well as daily wine tastings.

In addition to getaway vacation rentals, Polymath Park provides tours of all four houses on a daily basis.
