= Polymath Park =

Resort in Acme, Pennsylvania

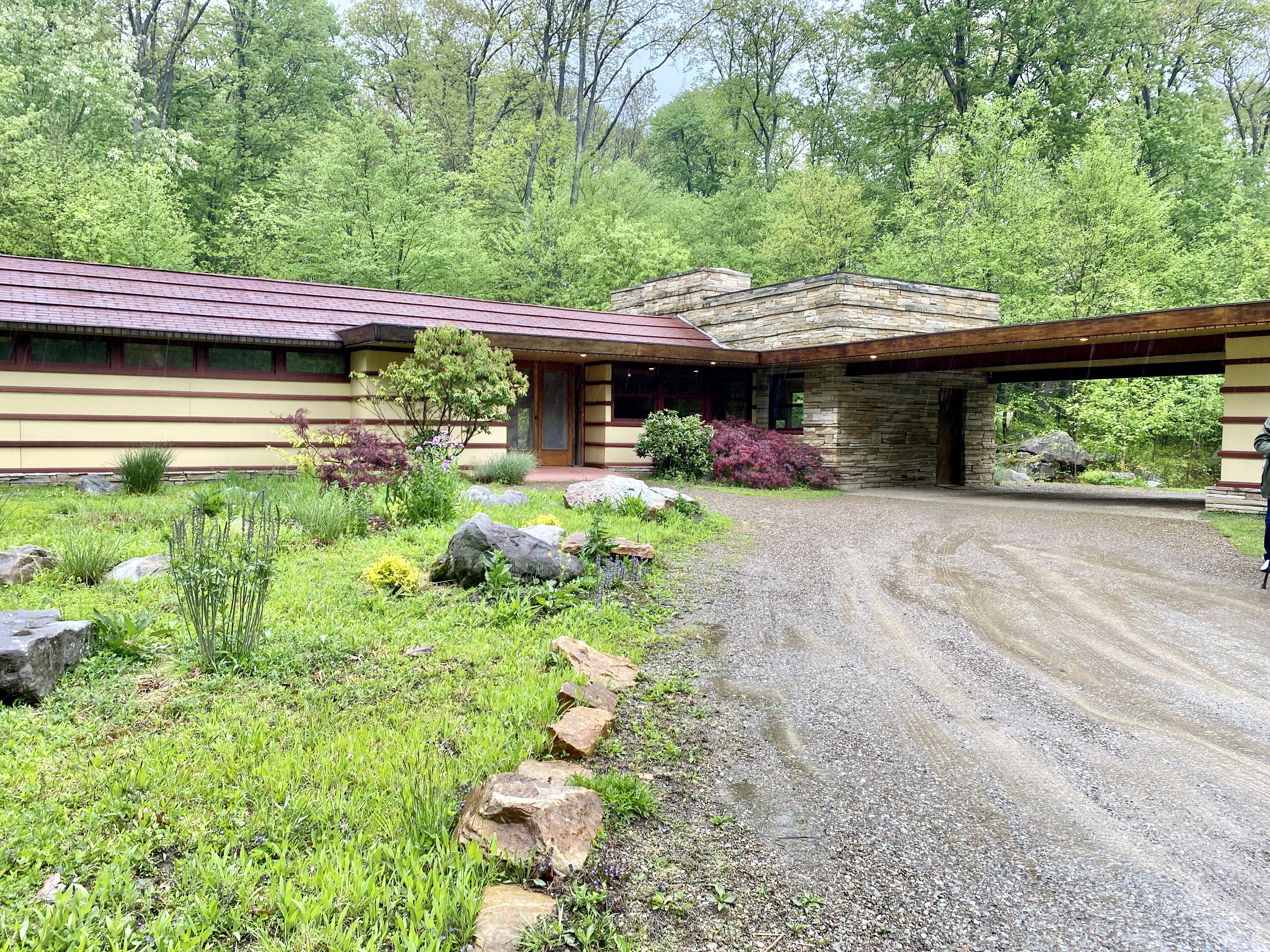
- Interactive map of Polymath Park
- Location: Acme, Westmoreland County, Pennsylvania, U.S.
- Nearest town: Acme, Pennsylvania
- Coordinates: 40.1588°N 79.416°W
- Area: 130 acres (53 ha)
- Website: www.franklloydwrightovernight.net

Polymath Park is a 130-acre (0.53 km^{2}) resort near Acme in Westmoreland County, Pennsylvania, United States. The site features four historic houses: two relocated houses designed by Frank Lloyd Wright and two houses designed by apprentice Peter Berndtson. Polymath Park is located 60 miles (97 km) southeast of Pittsburgh in the Laurel Highlands of Western Pennsylvania.

== Description ==
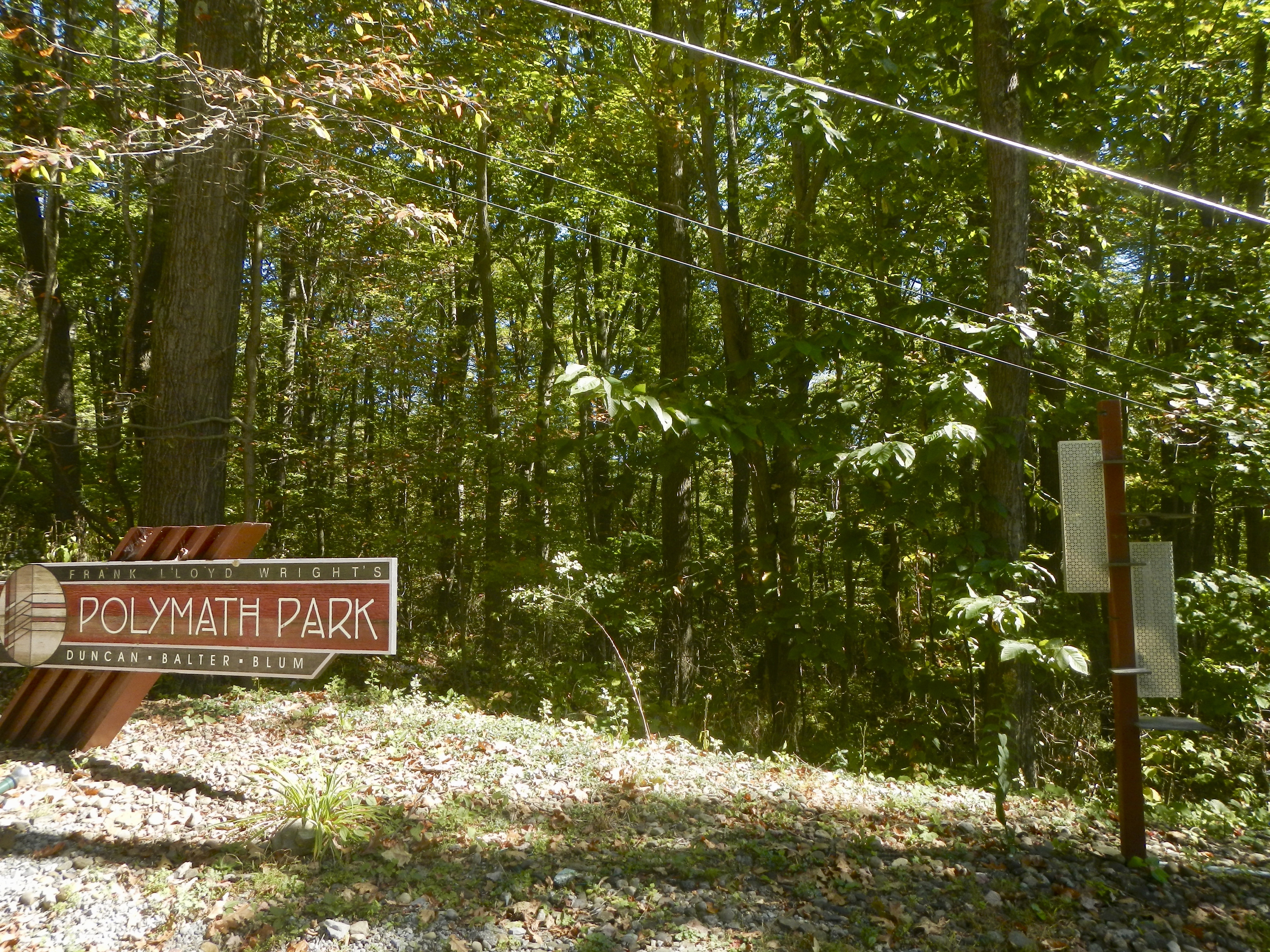
Polymath Park sign

Polymath Park is surrounded by private forest in the Allegheny Mountains and features four architectural landmarks: Frank Lloyd Wright's (1867–1959) Donald C. Duncan House and R. W. Lindholm Residence, and the Balter and Blum Houses by Peter Berndtson (1909–1972), who was one of the original Wright apprentices.

Polymath Park is near Wright's Fallingwater (23 miles) and Kentuck Knob (29 miles).

All four houses are open to guided tours and overnight guests. Duncan House and Lindholm House are the only Wright houses in the area that offer overnight stays.

Polymath Park is run by the nonprofit Usonian Preservation Corporation. Proceeds from rentals go toward maintenance of the houses and to architectural education programs.

== History ==
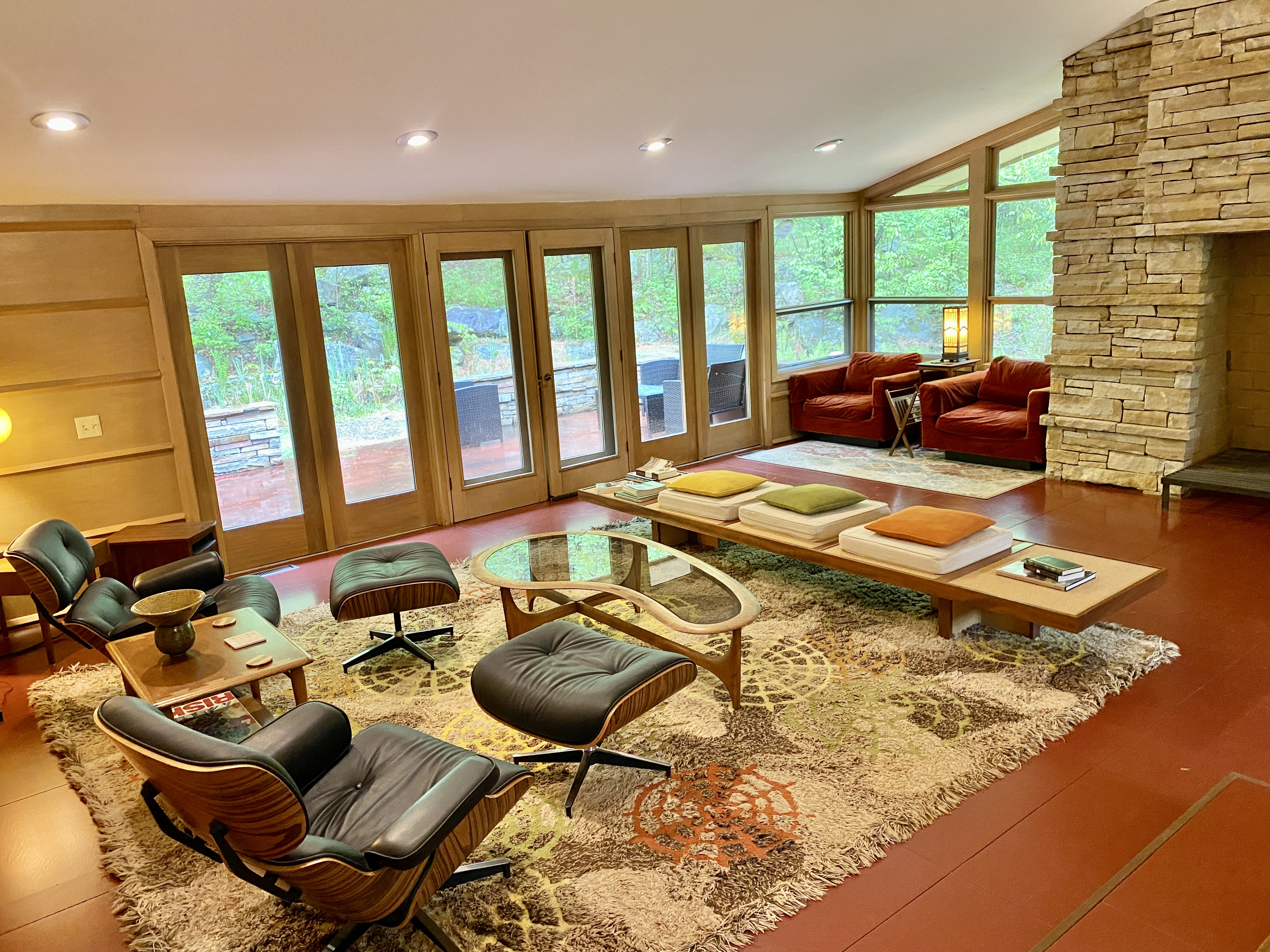
Interior of the Duncan House

Peter Berndtson's 1962 master plan for Polymath Park allowed for 24 dwellings, each sited in a circular clearing in the forest. Only two houses, however, were actually built: the Balter House in 1964 and the Blum House in 1965.

Duncan House was added to the park in June 2007. Built in 1957 in Lisle, Illinois, for Donald and Elizabeth Duncan, Wright's prefab Usonian was deconstructed in suburban Chicago in 2004 and reassembled in Pennsylvania.

Lindholm House, named Mäntylä, was built in 1952 for R. W. Lindholm at Cloquet, Minnesota, and was dismantled in 2016 and rebuilt at Polymath Park in 2018. It opened in April 2019.
