= Kentuck Knob =

House in Stewart Township, Pennsylvania, US

- Isaac Newton and Bernardine Hagan House
- U.S. National Register of Historic Places
- U.S. National Historic Landmark
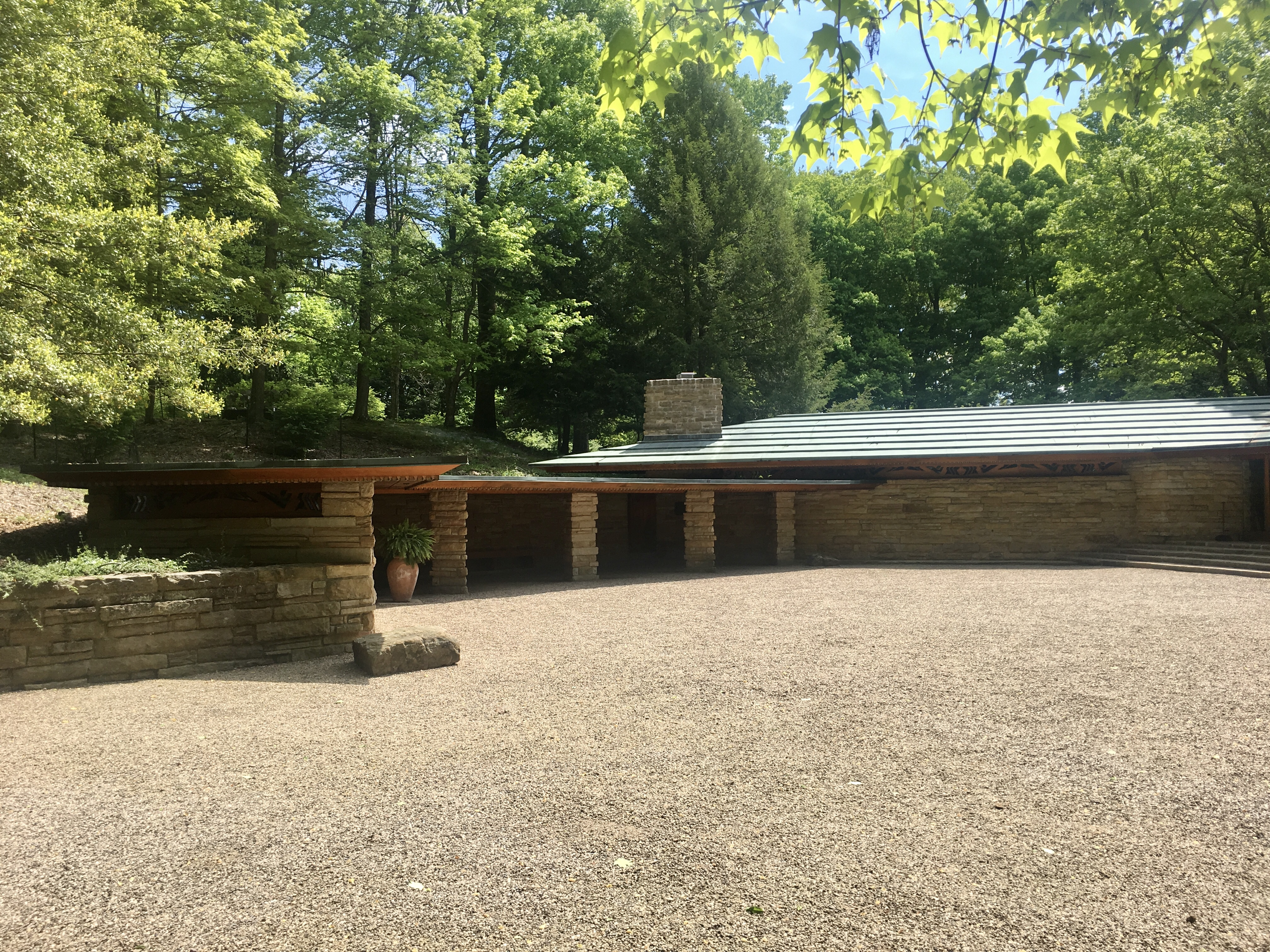

- Location within Pennsylvania Location within the United States
- Interactive map of Isaac Newton and Bernardine Hagan House
- Location: 723 Kentuck Road, Chalkhill, Pennsylvania, U.S.
- Nearest city: Uniontown, Pennsylvania
- Coordinates: 39°52′10″N 79°31′12″W
- Built: 1953–56
- Architect: Frank Lloyd Wright
- Architectural style: Usonian
- NRHP reference No.: 00000708

Significant dates
- Added to NRHP: May 16, 2000
- Designated NHL: May 16, 2000

Kentuck Knob (also known as the Hagan House) is a house in Stewart Township within Fayette County, Pennsylvania, United States. Designed by the architect Frank Lloyd Wright in the Usonian style, the residence was built for Isaac Newton "I. N." Hagan, the owner of a local ice-cream firm, along with his wife, Bernardine. It is built on the southern slope of a knoll known as Kentuck Knob, overlooking the Youghiogheny River gorge. The name of the house and knoll is derived from Little Kentuck, a hill in Fayette County named by an 18th-century settler who was planning to move to Kentucky. The house is a designated National Historic Landmark.

I. N. and Bernardine Hagan had learned of Wright's work through Edgar J. Kaufmann, a businessman who had hired Wright to design the Fallingwater house in Fayette County. The Hagans purchased 79 acres (32 hectares) of land near Uniontown, Pennsylvania, in July 1953 and asked Wright to design a Usonian home for them. Despite being busy with multiple other projects, Wright agreed to design a house at Kentuck Knob, which was completed in 1956. The Hagans lived at Kentuck Knob until 1986, when they sold the property to the British nobleman Peter Palumbo, Baron Palumbo. Shortly afterward, the house was damaged by a fire, prompting the Palumbo family to renovate the house. Kentuck Knob has been open to the public for tours since 1996, and a visitor center there was completed in 2003.

The estate, accessed by a driveway from Pennsylvania State Route 2010, includes approximately 8,800 trees and a sculpture garden for the Palumbo family's art collection. The house is made of redwood and locally-quarried stone, with an overhanging copper roof and two exterior terraces. It is laid out around a hexagonal floor plan, which consists of two wings that partially surround a courtyard, converging at a hexagonal core. The interior covers 2,300 square feet (210 square metres) and consists of seven rooms in an open plan arrangement. The kitchen, within the house's core, is surrounded by a living room to the west and a dining room to the west. Three bedrooms extend northeast of the core and are partially embedded into the hillside. The house's carport, which includes an art studio, is attached to the bedroom wing.

== Site ==
Kentuck Knob is in Stewart Township, located within Fayette County in southwestern Pennsylvania, United States. It is located approximately 70 miles (110 kilometres) southeast of Pittsburgh. The estate was originally owned by the Hagan family and spanned 79 acres (32 ha); (Note: Some sources cite the site as covering 78 acres (32 ha).) it has been expanded over the years to more than 600 acres (240 ha). The estate is next to the Youghiogheny River, although the river gorge is not readily visible from the house due to the presence of trees. The building itself is on the southern slope of a hill also known as Kentuck Knob. (Note: The peak of the hill is variously cited as measuring 2,000 feet (610 m), 2,050 feet (620 m), or 2,080 feet (630 m) high.)

=== Geography and site usage ===
The house is accessed via a gravel driveway leading from Pennsylvania Route 2010 (PA 2010), which is variously cited as measuring either 1/4 mile (0.40 km) or nearly 1/2 mile (0.80 km) long. It winds through some woods and passes above a waterfall called Cucumber Falls. In addition to the main house, the property includes a greenhouse, farmhouse, barn, and wooden sheds; the greenhouse was salvaged from the nearby Fallingwater house. The site had originally been farmland, but after the Hagans acquired it, they planted about 8,800 trees on the hill. These included Canadian hemlock, pin oak, shellbark hickory, sugar maple, tulip poplar, white ash, and white oak specimens. Dogwoods were also planted along the driveway, though many of these specimens later died. There are numerous boulders on the estate, which are arranged to give the appearance that they ended up there naturally, even though they were installed when the house was built. The boulders, along with ferns and evergreen plants, create a Japanese garden–like setting around the house.

After the family of the British nobleman Peter Palumbo, Baron Palumbo, acquired the house, they added a sculpture meadow, which is accessed by a winding trail that connects to the visitor center. British products are sold at the visitor center. The meadow includes works by artists such as Harry Bertoia, Scott Burton, Anthony Caro, Andy Goldsworthy, Alvar Gullichsen, Allen Jones, Phillip King, David Nash, Claes Oldenburg, Eva Reichl, George Rickey, Ray Smith, Wendy Taylor, and Michael Warren. Other pieces in the sculpture garden include two graffitied pieces of the Berlin Wall, a restroom structure, English telephone kiosks, and a pissoir. The sculptures incorporate materials like granite, steel, and wood, complementing the design of the main house. There is also a fragment of a finial, which was installed at Kentuck Knob in 2003; it had been part of the Mappin & Webb Building in London, demolished in 1994. Aside from the sculptures, the landscape retains most of its original Hagan-era design.

=== Surroundings ===
The Sugarloaf Knob is southeast of the house, while the Fort Necessity National Battlefield is to the southwest. In addition, a conservation easement for Ohiopyle State Park abuts the estate. Kentuck Knob is one of four buildings in southwestern Pennsylvania designed by Frank Lloyd Wright. The others are Fallingwater, a 7-mile (11 km) drive to the northeast, (Note: Geographically, Fallingwater is 4 miles (6.4 km) away.) as well as Duncan House and Lindholm House at Polymath Park in Acme, Pennsylvania. Apart from Fallingwater, Kentuck Knob is the only other house in Fayette County designed by Wright.

The name originates from David Askins, a settler who wanted to move to Kentucky in the late 18th century. He ultimately instead occupied a hill in Fayette County, which he called Little Kentuck. The Askins site, formed through the merger of the Mitchell, Morris, and Thorpe families' farms, later became Stewart Township's Kentuck District. Because the area is mountainous, it has remained largely undeveloped over the years. Just before the Hagan family bought the site, it was occupied by two Eastern European immigrants, Donath and Anna Peles, who had lived there since World War I.

== History ==
=== Development ===
The house on Kentuck Knob was developed for the Hagan family, who owned a major dairy company in Western Pennsylvania (Hagan Ice Cream, later acquired by Crowley Foods). The family then lived in an undistinguished brick house in Uniontown, Pennsylvania; they collected textiles and pottery, which they felt did not fit the style of their Uniontown house. Isaac Newton "I. N." Hagan and his wife Bernardine were acquainted with the family of Edgar J. Kaufmann, who built the nearby Fallingwater in the late 1930s. Kaufmann had first met I. N. Hagan several years before Kentuck Knob's construction, when he asked Hagan whether he could bottle local farmers' milk. The Hagans learned about Wright's work through the Kaufmanns, whom they sometimes visited. After multiple trips to Fallingwater, Bernardine came to regard it as "a very beautiful, unusual place", while I. N. said that he had become more attracted to Fallingwater on each successive visit. As I. N. later said, "My wife and I have always had our hearts set on living on a Wright home." Their son Paul, an aspiring architect, had also taken an interest in Fallingwater's design.

==== Site acquisition and Wright commission ====
The Hagans bought a 79-acre (32 ha) tract in the mountains south of Uniontown in July 1953, where they wanted Wright to design a house. They commissioned the broker Herman Keys to buy the tract on their behalf for $9,000, (Note: About $108,302 in 2025) and Keys immediately resold the tract to the Hagans for a nominal fee of $1. (Note: About $12 in 2025) The seller was the Peles family, who retained ownership of a farmhouse and several outbuildings next to the road. The Peles family continued to farm on another tract they owned. At the time, few people in Uniontown lived in the mountains because it was stigmatized, but the Hagans wanted to "partially remove" themselves from Uniontown's more urban character. The growing popularity of the automobile, in any case, meant that they could easily drive to Uniontown.

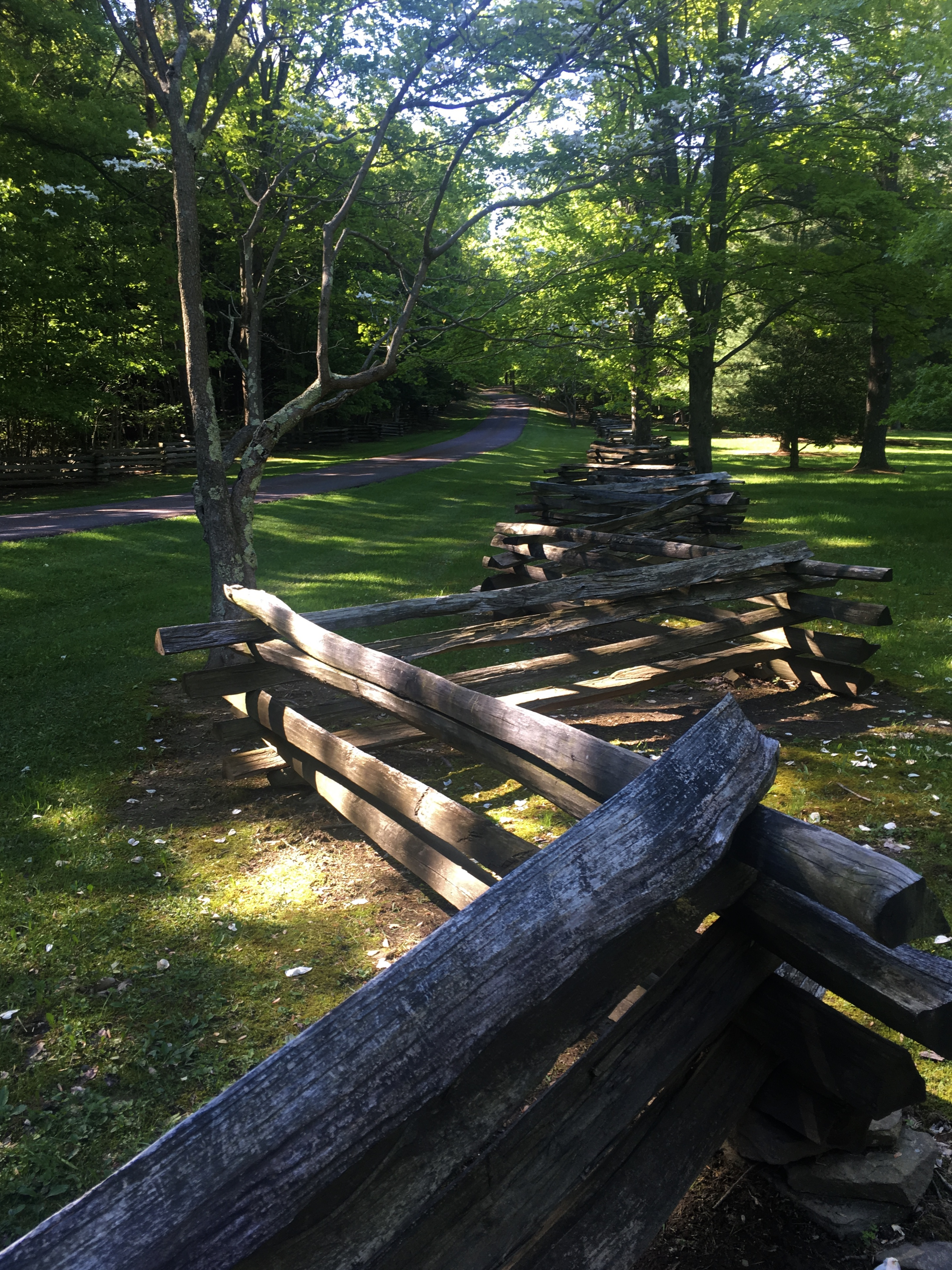
A fence on the estate

I. N. reached out to Kaufmann, who advised the Hagans to call Wright, not write to him, to ask whether he would design them a house. In August 1953, the Hagans brought Paul and his friend James Baker to Fallingwater just before Paul's wedding. The same day, I. N. wrote a letter asking Wright to design them a home. Wright took his time responding, even though, according to the scholar Donald Hoffmann, the Hagans' mountainside site "should have immediately appealed to him". The Hagans called Wright, who invited them to his Taliesin studio in Wisconsin. During their visit to Taliesin later in August, the family requested a one-story stone-and-wood structure with three bedrooms and two bathrooms. Wright claimed he "could shake a design out of my sleeve" and asked the Hagans about their hobbies and what they wanted in a house. He also asked the Hagans if they were "nesters or perchers" to decide whether to put the house beside or atop the hill, ultimately opting for a site on the hill's southern slope.

When the family returned to Pennsylvania, they toured the Richard C. Smith House, Unitarian Meeting House, and Jacobs First House, all designed by Wright. These influenced the final design of Kentuck Knob; the Smith House and Meeting House were both arranged on a grid with 60-degree angles, and the Hagans liked the Meeting House's copper roof and the Smith House's dentils and trellises. The Hagans also traveled to New York City to see an exhibit about a Usonian house. I. N. described the site in a letter to Wright that September, saying that the peak of the knoll "probably presents a pretty discouraging picture". The Hagans returned to Fallingwater after Kaufmann offered to give the family stones from a quarry on his property. In November 1953, Wright's secretary Eugene Masselink wrote to the Hagans, saying that design work would soon begin. By then, the Hagans were considering a house with a board-and-batten facade and a flat roof, rather than the stone structure Wright envisioned.

==== Design ====
At the time he took the commission, Wright was 86 years old and was simultaneously designing structures such as the Guggenheim Museum in New York, the Beth Sholom Synagogue in the Philadelphia metropolitan area of Pennsylvania, and the Price Tower in Oklahoma. Accordingly, Wright delegated many of his other projects to apprentices. John H. Howe, Wright's chief draftsman and longtime apprentice, drew the plans for the house. The initial plans were completed in February 1954 and included a drawing of the site with boulders scattered throughout. The plans called for a glass-walled structure with two wings radiating from a core, enclosing a central entrance court. Since Howe had not visited the site, the early drawings were riddled with errors; for example, the house was oriented the wrong way, and the drawings misrepresented the topography. Wright also did not visit the site until the design was completed, instead relying on contour maps.

The Hagans soon requested changes to the plan, saying that some design features, such as the living room and kitchen, were too small for their needs. Though Wright was known to be generally irascible and resistant to change, he readily agreed to the Hagans' requests. He lengthened the living room, relocated the living-room windows away from the house's terrace, moved the basement stair, and added a painting studio for Bernardine. Wright modified the kitchen's floors and countertops and added a screen to the kitchen, and he expanded the dining room upon learning that the Hagans did not frequently eat out. The main facade, which originally faced in a more southerly direction, was rotated about 15 degrees clockwise. He overruled some of the Hagans' other requests, such as insulated glass panes (which he felt unnecessary) and a wider hallway, and he overruled the Hagans' preferences for a smaller terrace.

The Hagans ultimately traveled to Taliesin and Wright's other studio, Taliesin West, five times to negotiate elements of the design. Since the Hagans intended to spend $60,000 on the house, (Note: About $719,000 in 2025) Wright billed the Hagans $3,000 for the initial drawings (five percent of the construction cost). (Note: About $36,000 in 2025) He later billed them an additional $3,750 in late April 1954, having decided to raise the construction budget to $75,000 without consulting with the Hagans, who were dismayed at the sudden cost increase. (Note: The additional design fee is about $45,000, and the revised construction cost $899,000, in 2025) Because Wright was known to exceed clients' budgets, Kaufmann had advised the Hagans to give Wright half their desired budget. By May 1954, the house was expected to cost more than twice its original estimate, $124,000, in part due to its secluded site. (Note: About $1,492,000 in 2025) Herman Keys, who was retained as their general contractor, told them that the first floor alone would cost $35,000. (Note: About $420,000 in 2025) According to the historian Donald Kaufmann, the cost increases were in line with the various changes made to the design, which included upscale furnishings, expanded rooms, and updated materials.

==== Construction ====
Construction began in mid-1954. The Hagan family originally wanted to use Pottsville sandstone from the same quarry that provided Fallingwater's stone, but they instead decided to use stone from their own property. Sources disagree on whether the Hagans rejected the Pottsville sandstone as too expensive or whether they liked their own estate's stone more. The family hired local workers, including Keys and the stonemason Jesse Wilson Sr. Keys constructed the foundation first, filling it with loose stone and compacted fill. Wilson and his son Jesse Jr. began working on the stone in September, training a small group of workers to split the stone. After the stone had been split, the Wilsons carved the stone into approximately-rectangular pieces with rough faces. One story has it that the stonemasons interpreted Wright's plans literally and found stones that were the same shape, and in the same locations as those that Wright had sketched out.

Wright originally did not want to apply a surface finish to the Tidewater red cypress on the facade, as he believed that the wood would preserve itself. An employee of his studio eventually convinced him to apply a glossy finish to prevent discoloration, and Clarence S. Coughenour of Uniontown was hired to construct the woodwork. Another local contractor, Henry J. Cooper, was hired to construct the building's copper roof. During construction, Keys convinced Wright to add reinforcement to the roof, despite the architect's insistence that the roof was sturdy. Wright visited the site once during construction. During his three-hour-long visit, he expressed satisfaction with the stonemasons' work, and he relocated the house's site by 10 feet (3.0 m) while keeping the plans otherwise unchanged. Although the Friends of Fallingwater Newsletter wrote that Wright declined to assign an apprentice to oversee the project, Wilson constructed a sample wall section for Wright, who left once he was satisfied with the results.

The cement work and the bases of each wall were completed by early 1955, at which point the Wilsons began laying the stone. The construction supervisor largely left the Wilsons alone because he was unfamiliar with the masonry-laying process. Two artisans were responsible for carving all the house's woodwork. The house ultimately cost $82,329; (Note: About $974,000 in 2025) if furnishings are included, the total cost amounted to $98,057. (Note: About $1,161,000 in 2025) The Hagan family acquired other furniture, in addition to the pieces Wright designed for Kentuck Knob. For example, the Kaufmanns' son Edgar Kaufmann Jr. took the Hagans to New York to buy Scandinavian furniture, and they hired George Nakashima to design additional pieces of furniture for the house. In addition, the Hagans ordered some Moroccan rugs from the Kaufmann's store, as well as chairs designed by Hans Wegner.

=== Hagan ownership ===
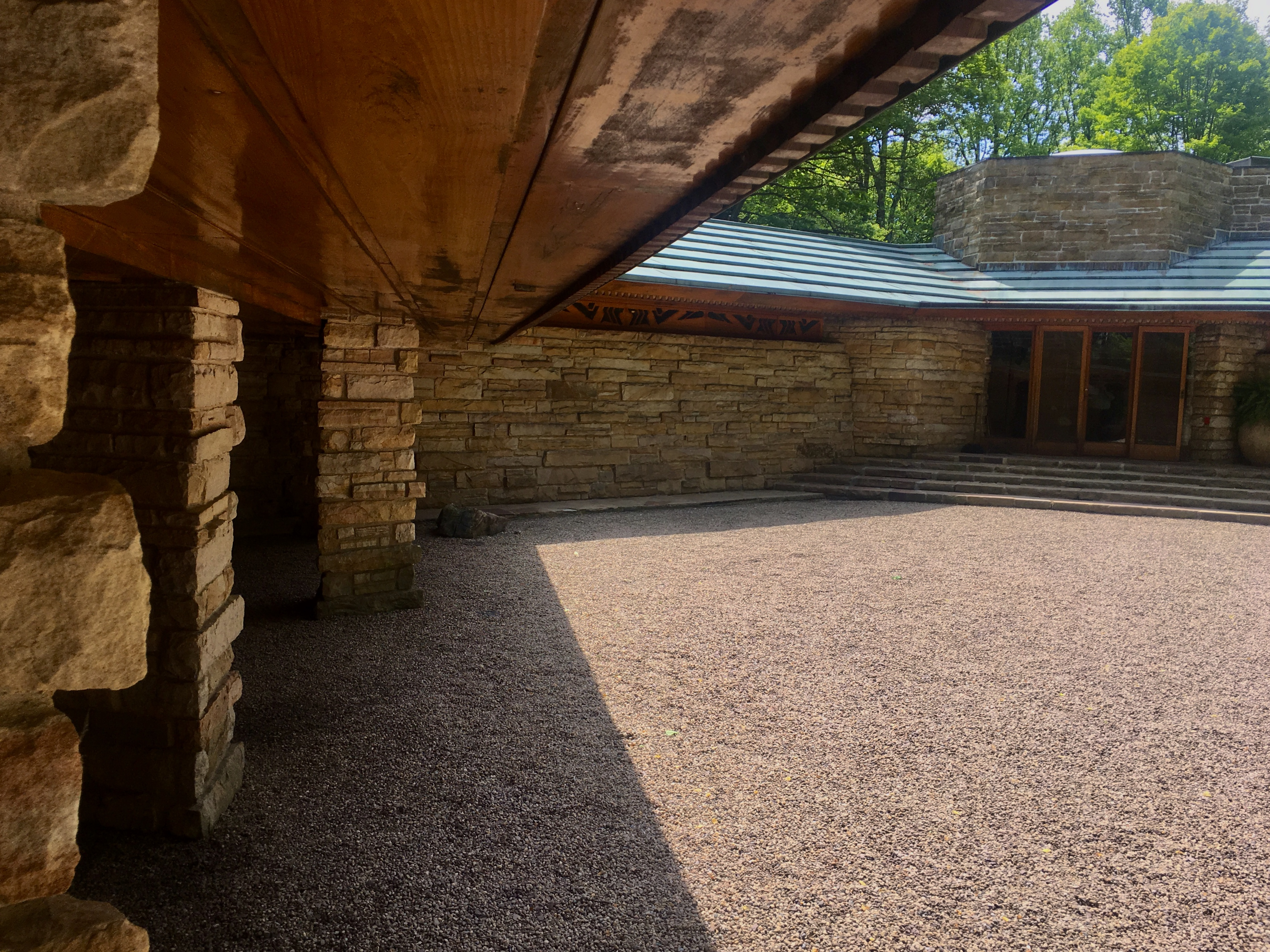
View from Kentuck Knob's courtyard, looking toward the main entrance

The Hagans moved into the house on their 26th anniversary, July 29, 1956. Passersby quickly began taking notice of the building, and the Hagans sometimes came home to see sightseers gawking at it. Visitors peered through the windows when the Hagans were absent, and they sometimes asked for tours when the Hagans were present. The Hagans only sporadically allowed photographs and tours, and the exact location of Kentuck Knob was originally not publicized because Bernardine Hagan wanted to "keep it as quiet as we could". The house garnered less attention than the nearby Fallingwater, which later became a world-famous tourist attraction. Despite the publicity, I. N. said that the house's beauty more than made up for the "occasional inconveniences". After the Hagans moved in, it took them over a year to pay Wright's full architectural fee. Wright never visited the completed house, saying that he already knew the house's appearance because he had designed it. Wright also designed a building for Hagan Ice Cream, although this was not constructed.

In the years after the Hagans moved in, they made several modifications to the estate. For example, they planted thousands of tree seedlings outside the house, and Bernardine modified the landscape by adding earthen terraces and a pathway. The Hagans also added a small water fountain near the master bedroom, and they acquired a greenhouse from Fallingwater. Over the years, I. N. and Bernardine decorated the house with objects that they had acquired during their travels abroad, including two prints from Thailand. By the early 1980s, the Hagans wanted to sell Kentuck Knob, as I. N. had Alzheimer's disease, and Bernardine was worried that he would wander the estate and get lost. In 1983, the auction house Sotheby's Parke-Bernet began advertising Kentuck Knob for sale on behalf of the Hagan family, with an asking price of $675,000. (Note: About $2,182,000 in 2025) Due to Kentuck Knob's remote location, the house remained unsold for several years.

=== Palumbo ownership ===
==== Purchase ====
The British nobleman Lord Peter Palumbo learned of the house in April 1985 after visiting Fallingwater; upon learning about Kentuck Knob during that visit, Palumbo traveled there as well. The Hartford Courant writes that Palumbo had learned about the house after overhearing someone else's conversation at Fallingwater, while other sources wrote that someone told him about Kentuck Knob directly. Lord Palumbo later said that he "fell in love with the outside" of Kentuck Knob and wanted to see the inside so urgently that he decided to purchase it; he also described the site as being of "spectacular beauty" regardless of the season. Palumbo acquired the house in 1986, paying $600,000. (Note: About $1,762,000 in 2025) The Penobscot Corporation was recorded as the legal buyer; the acquisition included not only the 79-acre Hagan estate but also 1,000 acres (400 ha) of woods around it. At the time, Palumbo owned several other structures, including the Farnsworth House in Plano, Illinois, and Maisons Jaoul outside Paris, France.

Shortly after the Palumbo family obtained the house, it was substantially damaged in a fire on May 26, 1986, after a gardener put away a hot lawnmower that subsequently discharged sparks. The blaze destroyed parts of the roof and caused smoke and water damage throughout the house, which was vacant at the time. After the fire, the Palumbo family renovated the interior, including the tidewater-cypress surfaces, and furnished the house with rare items. Robert Taylor, who had helped design the house, was hired to design its renovation as well. Lord Palumbo added furniture by designers such as Frank Lloyd Wright, Carlo Bugatti, Charles Rennie Mackintosh, and Gustav Stickley. In addition, he decorated the estate with several pieces of modern sculpture. By the mid-1990s, the Palumbo family were often absent from the house for long periods, and they alternated between their various houses to reduce wear and tear at Kentuck Knob.

==== Opening as visitor attraction ====
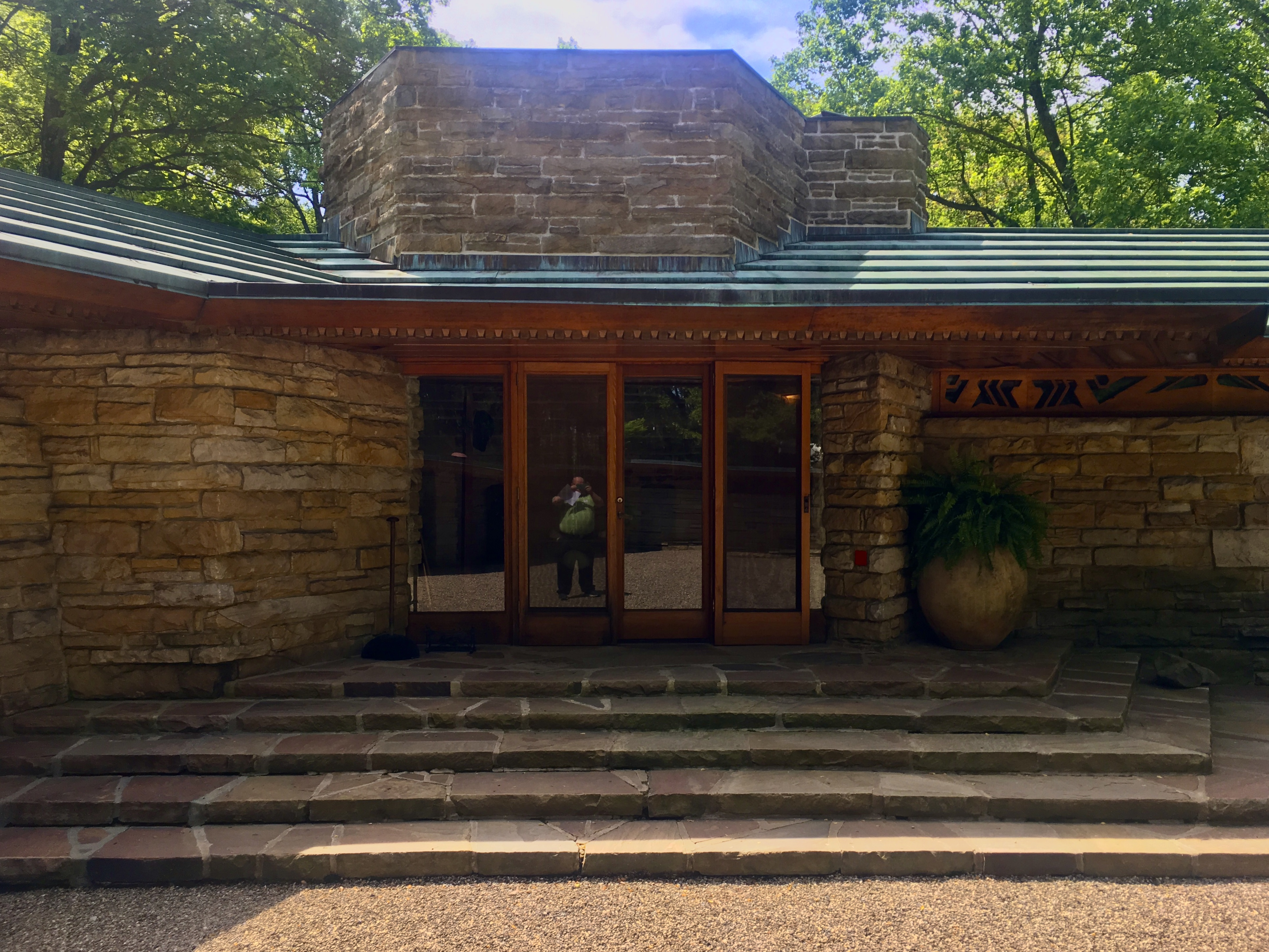
The main entrance

The family announced in March 1996 that it would open the house to tourists, and public tours began that May. At the time, Palumbo did not know if his adult children were interested in it, and he wanted to preserve the house as a cultural resource. Kentuck Knob's visitor center was initially located within the estate's greenhouse, and the estate's administrator Susan Waggoner trained 10 docents to give tours. The various rooms were decorated with the Palumbo family's belongings in a similar fashion to English manors, whose owners often opened their houses to the public while continuing to live there. Lord Palumbo and his wife continued to visit on occasion, but they typically left the house before 9 a.m., when visitors came in. The tours typically were limited to either 8 or 15 people per group. On occasion, the family joined the tours of their own house, and Bernardine Hagan also visited her old residence sporadically. The house was closed to visitors three weeks of the year, when the Palumbos resided there, and it was also shuttered on Mondays.

Within six months of opening to the public, Kentuck Knob had hosted 13,000 visitors. In the long run, the Palumbo family hoped that the house could be financially self-sufficient. The family also continued to add artwork to the grounds; for example, they acquired Ray Smith's artwork Red Army in 1997, and they obtained a George Rickey sculpture. In addition, Palumbo bought extra land to give his family privacy, and the house also began hosting limited tours during sunrise in the late 1990s. Lord Palumbo also considered hiring Frank Gehry to design a permanent visitor center for Kentuck Knob, in addition to a master plan for the entire estate. Palumbo decided against hiring Gehry after learning that the architect would charge $3 million for his design. (Note: About $5,609,000 in 2025) Afterward, Palumbo bought 22 acres (8.9 ha) next to the existing estate and hired Arthur Lubetz in May 2000 to design the visitor center for about $350,000. (Note: About $654,000 in 2025) The same month, Kentuck Knob was designated as a National Historic Landmark. The visitor center began construction in late 2000 and was financed by the Progress Fund. The estate had accommodated more than 100,000 visitors by then, and the visitor center was opened in May 2003.

During their ownership of Kentuck Knob, the Palumbos acquired another 650 acres (260 ha) for a wildlife preserve. In celebration of the house's 50th anniversary in 2006, three trees were dedicated on the grounds to honor the craftsmen that had helped erect the structure. The house continued to operate as a tourist attraction in the 2020s. The Palumbos no longer lived there (instead residing in a farmhouse nearby), but they continued to own Kentuck Knob and were involved in the house's operation. Palumbo's grandson Philip told the Pittsburgh Post-Gazette in 2025 that he was considering "very gentle innovations" for the site, including an arboretum and transport museum. Tickets to the house include a tour of the house's interior and a walk around the estate; the house tour is led by a docent, while the tour of the grounds is self-guided. It is typically open to visitors between March and September of each year.

== Architecture ==
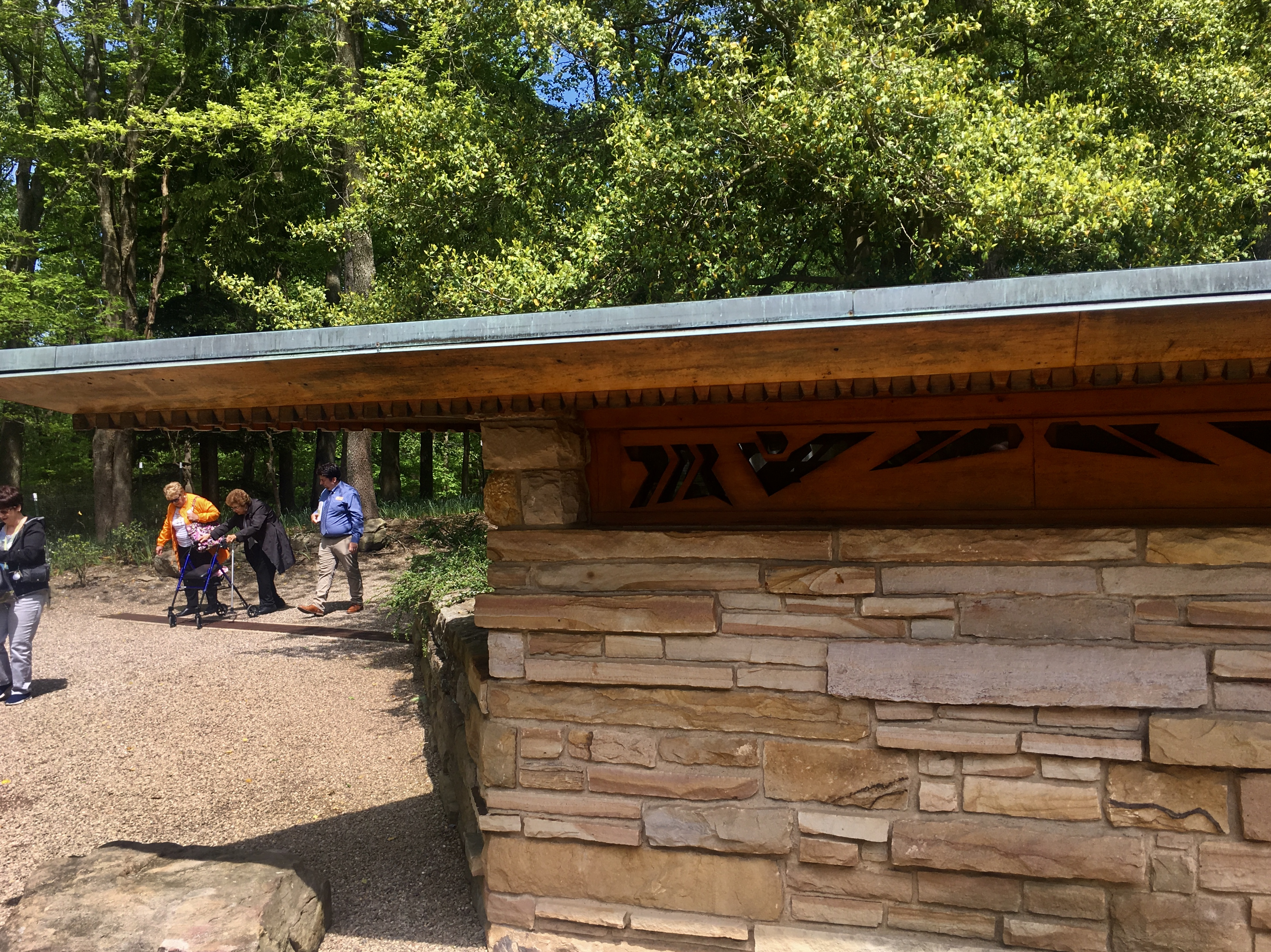
The roof eaves protrude from the stone facade.

Kentuck Knob is a single-story dwelling with three bedrooms. The building is one of Wright's few remaining higher-end Usonian houses, as well as an example of Wright's later Usonian work. The design includes elements of organic architecture. Wright made extensive use of stone, a material that he described as creating inspiring "marvels of beauty"; Kentuck Knob may incorporate around 800 short tons (710 long tons; 730 t) of stone. Most of the stone for the house came from the estate itself, though the floors use stone from Maryland. The house also has woodwork made of Tidewater red cypress, which was selected because the material did not rot easily; sources disagree on whether the wood came from Florida or South Carolina. Large amounts of glass are also used for the walls and rooftop skylights. Kentuck Knob also includes typical Usonian features such as built-in furniture, narrow corridors, and a carport. The building's design details are partially influenced by the International Style, despite Wright's distaste for that style.

The house has two wings (a living-room wing and bedroom wing), which bend away from each other at a 120-degree angle and are of equal length. The wings converge at a hexagonal core, which resembles a stone chimney. These wings are built around a floor grid consisting of equilateral triangles measuring 2.3 feet (0.70 m) long on each side. (Note: Hoffmann 2000, pp. 33–34, includes diagrams of the floor grids. The distance between the base and vertex of each equilateral triangle is 2 feet (0.61 m), while the side length is 2 feet 3 11/16 inches (0.703 m). Other sources cite the triangles as having a side length of 4.5 feet (1.4 m), nearly twice the actual side length.) The grid consists of parallel lines on three axes, each running 4 feet (1.2 m) apart and at a 60-degree orientation to each other. The arrangement of the lines creates equilateral-hexagonal tiles, each consisting of six equilateral triangles. There are standalone equilateral triangles adjacent to each side of every hexagon; the juxtaposition of shapes creates overlapping hexagrams (six-sided stars) and parallelograms. The grid dictated the size and shape of the interior furniture. The house is variously cited as containing either 53, 54, or 58 exterior angles. Due to the grid, the house is sometimes described as not having any right angles or having only two right angles.

In a similar manner to a passive solar house, the building is oriented to the west and south, since the house primarily received natural light from these directions throughout the year. The orientation reflects Wright's belief that every room should be exposed to sunlight at some point throughout the day. As such, the living room could receive direct sunlight in the winter, but not in the summer. The bedroom wing, extending to the northeast, is partly embedded into the adjacent knoll. Wright stated that the grid of triangles also enabled the house to "embrace the hill and at the same time open the interior space in unexpected ways".

=== Exterior ===
==== Courtyard and terraces ====
The wings surround a gravel courtyard, which faces west and is accessed by the house's driveway. There is a studio and a carport with a flat canopy on the eastern side of the courtyard, embedded into the knoll. In addition, a retaining wall runs along the courtyard's western border. The end of the retaining wall contains a stone planter with a copper lamp and a pyramidal shade, which were designed by Wright. There are also two large terraces just outside the house. The main terrace, the larger of the two, adjoins the living-room wing and extends west and south to the ramparts, running the length of the wing. This terrace has a flagstone pavement and includes a rock garden and a triangular pool. Another flagstone terrace is located to the southeast just outside the intersection of the two wings. The secondary terrace is surrounded by a retaining wall and includes a fountain to its north. The terraces are separated from the interior by glass walls and are surrounded by parapets that run under the roof.

==== Facade ====
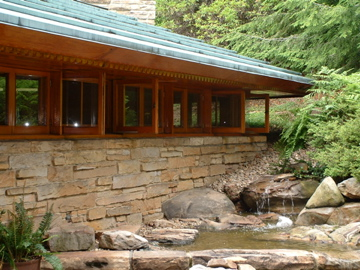
The stone of Kentuck Knob's facade came from the estate itself.

The house sits on concrete ramparts with stone cladding, which measure 10 inches (25 cm) thick. The sandstone facade is arranged in irregular horizontal courses, each measuring 13 inches (33 cm) high, the exact width of one board and one batten inside the house. The stone is characterized as having a golden-brown tint. When the house was built, Wright specified that the facade be composed of a pattern of two narrow courses between wider courses. Each of the walls is 12 inches (30 cm) thick, consisting of a 2-inch-thick (5.1 cm) insulating layer sandwiched between two layers of rock. To make the stonework appear more natural, the stone is laid irregularly, with random stones protruding past the rest of the facade. The walls are placed atop a concrete foundation. The southern tip of the living-room wing contains a prow-shaped protrusion underneath the roof. The site slopes down to the southeast, where a stone podium slopes inward, supporting the prow.

The main entrance is located within the house's core, where the wings intersect. A flagstone stoop ascends to a set of double doors, where a small canopy and glass panels protrude from the facade. Each step in the stoop is about 4 inches (100 mm) high. The entrance is surrounded by multicolored stones in muted colors, and there are wooden boards with geometric cutouts above the doors. Wright inscribed his initials on a small red tile along the facade next to the entrance; this was one of 19 projects where Wright signed his name. A walkway with a flagstone pavement leads to the carport.

The facade itself is lit indirectly by recessed triangular light bulbs and is decorated with various geometric motifs. On the southern, western, and eastern elevations are doors reaching from floor to ceiling, as well as wood-framed casement windows, all of which contain plate-glass panes. The edges of one of the living-room windows are recessed within the stone wall, making the window nearly imperceptible. The northern elevation has small clerestories and deep eaves (or outward extensions of the roof) for privacy. The clerestories, near the tops of the facade, are composed of horizontal wooden cypress boards with cutouts. The clerestories, paired with the facade's courses and the roof, emphasize the horizontal decorative features of the house.

==== Roof ====
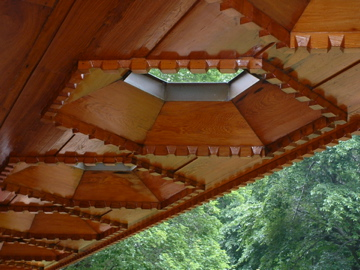
The hexagonal cutouts of the eaves

The roof has a pitch, or slope, of 20 degrees. It is mostly clad in copper, which was originally brown-colored but has oxidized into a blue-green color over the years. There are horizontal battens along the roof. A skylight and the house's primary chimney are located above the core, while another chimney is located in the northern (bedroom) wing, near the carport. The canopy of the carport and the roof of the studio adjacent to it both have flat gravel roofs with copper drains.

The house has cantilevered eaves with hexagonal cutouts; there are 24 hexagonal cutouts on the southern elevation alone. These cutouts help with ventilation, and they also allow patches of sunlight to shine through the eaves, which otherwise create shadows. On the entirety of the southern and western elevations, and part of the eastern elevation, the eaves range from 3 to 10 feet (0.91 to 3.05 m) long. Above the storage room, the roof is cantilevered up to 6 feet (1.8 m) from the wall, and above the main entrance, the roof is cantilevered over 9 feet (2.7 m) from the wall. The eaves are decorated with wooden dentils. and also contain triangular lights and downspouts. At the southern end of the house, an eave cuts across the living-room prow, running at a 60-degree angle to both of the prow's walls.

=== Interior ===
External image
- Images of the building and floor plans

The house has seven rooms. Its precise floor area is difficult to calculate because of its angled floor plan, though it is commonly cited as having a floor area of 2,300 square feet (210 m^{2}). (Note: Other sources give figures of 2,500 square feet (230 m^{2}), 3,000 square feet (280 m^{2}), or 3,600 square feet (330 m^{2}).) The kitchen occupies the center of the house, within the chimney core. The living and dining rooms respectively extend west and south of the core, within the house's western wing, while the bedrooms extend northeast of the core, within the house's northern wing. The house's soffits ascend toward a ridge, which measures 11 feet (3.4 m) high and was intended to draw viewers' attention both to the center of the room and the landscape outside. Other parts of the interior have low ceilings and narrow passageways. The house has an open plan with few interior doors, and there were no drapes or curtains in the original design. Wright expected that the orientation of the house would instead provide privacy.

The floors are almost entirely made of stone, except for the carpeted living room and a cork floor in the kitchen. The original plan called for a painted concrete floor, with grooves corresponding to the floor grid; the stone floor was installed at the request of the Hagans, who wanted the floor to be similar to that at Fallingwater. The walls and ceilings use glass, wood, and stone, with boards and battens fastened to plywood cores. There is a radiant heating system embedded into the floor, which uses hot water to warm the house during the winter. Wright did not include space for air conditioners, instead opting to ventilate the house naturally by allowing breezes to pass through the windows.

The hardware throughout the house is made of brass. Wright designed Kentuck Knob's built-in furniture, which is made of red tidewater cypress and was built to fit the dimensions of the house. There are also standalone furnishings designed by other decorators, including chairs by Hans Wegner, Finn Juhl, and George Nakashima. In particular, Nakashima designed 15 pieces of walnut furniture for the house, many of which did not fit the building's angular grid; these included a chest and two tables. Wright's associate Eugene Masselink designed a screen for the house as well. When the Palumbos acquired the house, they displayed their own belongings there.

==== Foyer ====
The main entrance opens into a foyer, which adjoins a kitchen within the house's core. The foyer has a transparent screen divided into four panels, which in turn is flanked by transparent sidelight windows. The arrangement of the screen and sidelights was intended to blur the distinction between the interior and exterior spaces. The foyer, as with many of the other interior spaces, is also decorated in cypress and sandstone. The foyer's ceiling is 6 feet 7 inches (2.01 m) high, taller than in many of Wright's houses, because the Hagans' son was taller than average. The living-room wing is located to the right (west) of the foyer. The bedroom wing is to the left (north) of the foyer and requires a 120-degree turn, an attempt to discourage guests from accessing the bedroom space.

==== Living-room wing ====
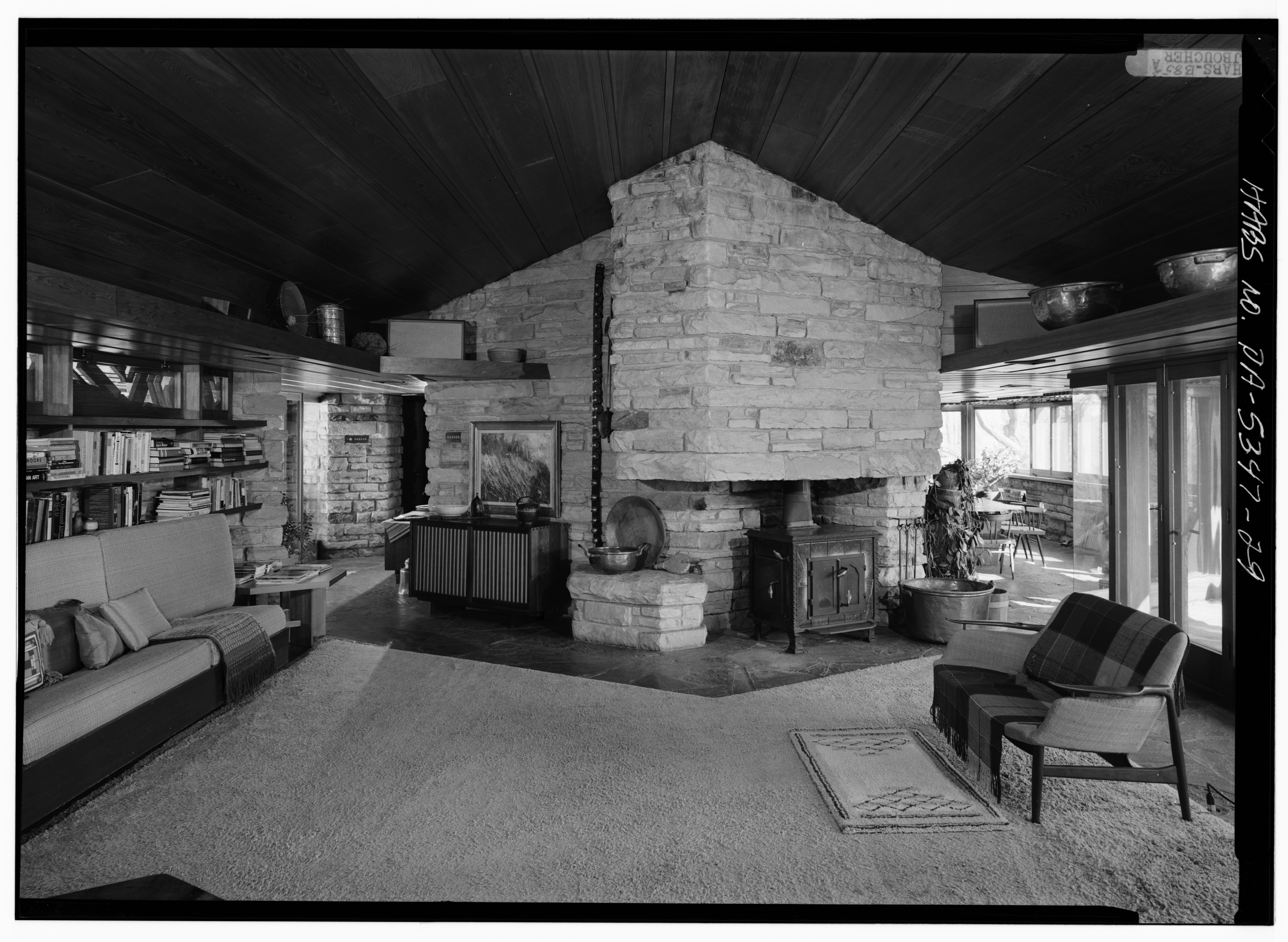
Interior of the living room

To the right (west) of the main entrance is the living room, which abuts the core. Much of the living room's floor is covered with a Moroccan carpet that was added after a fire in 1986. Electrical outlets are built into the floor because Bernardine did not want their appearance to detract from the walls' design. The living room has a sofa measuring 28 feet (8.5 m) wide, which faces south toward a group of glazed doors facing the terrace. The sofa has movable cushions, which conceal storage space. Above the sofa are cantilevered storage shelves with triangular light boxes, as well as clerestory windows at the top of the walls. There is also fretwork that resembles the shapes of mountain ranges. Throughout the living room are cabinets for electronics. The southern wall has a planter, which is placed next to a 4-by-8-foot (1.2 by 2.4 m) window to give the impression that the forest was extending into the house. The eastern wall (within the core) has a chimney with a cantilevered shelf above the fireplace; the fireplace includes a stone with a natural hollow, which is used to hold tinder sticks.

The kitchen is hexagonal and measures around 15 feet (4.6 m) high. (Note: Hoffmann 2000, p. 73, cites a different height of 14.5 feet (4.4 m).) It has a domed skylight made of plexiglass, which was retrofitted with an aluminum screen at some point after the house's completion. Besides the skylight, the kitchen has no windows. Wright had intended to decorate the kitchen in red, his favorite color, but several materials were swapped out during construction, essentially eliminating all the red decorations. As built, the room has a cork floor, stainless-steel countertops and sink, and cypress cabinets, in addition to four stove burners that can be flipped down. Bernardine rejected most of the furniture that Wright had suggested for the kitchen, except for a ventilation fan next to the stove burners. The kitchen has doorways on opposite walls, which connect the living and bedroom wings; the lintels above the doorways are made of stone.

There is a dining room to the south of the kitchen and east of the living room, which also faces the terrace to the south. The ceiling above the dining room measures 6 feet 7 inches (2.01 m) high, with board-and-batten panels that intersect at 120-degree angles. The ceiling also has hexagonal skylights, which are the same size as the horizontal cutouts in the eaves. The eastern wall of the dining room has a sideboard. The dining-room table, which extends from the sideboard, is angled to fit within the hexagonal and triangular grid. The window in the southwestern corner has miters.

==== Bedroom and carport wing ====
The bedroom wing includes three bedrooms and two bathrooms. (Note: Van Trump 1964, p. 23 gives a separate figure of three bedrooms and three bathrooms.) A narrow hallway or gallery runs northeast from the core. The hallway is barely wide enough for visitors to pass in single file, (Note: Sources disagree on whether the hallway is 1.5 feet (0.46 m) or 3 feet (0.91 m) wide.) and its western wall has built-in shelves topped by clerestories. The clerestories have movable windows and stationary perforated panels, in contrast to many other Usonian houses, where the panels are attached to the windows. At Bernardine's request, the panels and windows are kept separate to facilitate cleaning.

The bedrooms, leading off the hallway, are arranged in a line from north to south. All of the bedrooms have tidewater cypress furniture, walls, and ceilings. The southernmost bedroom was used by guests and is hexagonal, with a ceiling trapdoor, a private bathroom, a window wrapping around the corner, and windows overlooking the main terrace. The central bedroom has windows facing the bedroom terrace; it has an acute angle at the southwest corner due to an error made during the building's design. There is a second bathroom between the central and northernmost bedrooms. The northernmost bedroom was the master bedroom and has a triangular chimney with a fireplace, in addition to clerestories on the west wall, larger windows on the eastern wall, and an attic trapdoor. There are also shelves under the master bedroom's clerestory windows and a small water fountain near the master bedroom's windows.

Unlike many of Wright's other homes, Kentuck Knob has a basement, which originally contained storage and laundry rooms. The hallway's eastern wall leads to a doorway that connects with a stairway to the basement. Shelves were installed in the basement's original storage room in the 1980s, and another storage room in the basement was added at that time. The Hagans had wanted a larger basement, but Wright downsized the basement for practical reasons, and because he did not want a basement in the first place. Since the house was to be constructed on the side of a hill, a full basement would require more excavation than a partial basement.

Next to the bedroom wing is the carport, which extends northwest from the bedrooms, intersecting the bedroom wing at a 120-degree angle. The carport contains three parking spots separated by triangular piers; it has sandstone walls, a pea-gravel pavement, and a ledge on its rear wall. The ceiling of the carport is 6 1/3 feet (1.9 m) high. Behind the carport's rear wall is the studio, which was originally intended as a pump room but was modified at Bernardine Hagan's request. Cypress doors connect the carport with the studio, which has clerestory windows, in addition to a storage closet on its eastern wall. As built, the house did not contain an attic because Wright disliked that design feature. The Hagans subsequently added an attic for storage without telling Wright about it.

== Impact and legacy ==
=== Reception ===
The scholar James D. Van Trump described the house in 1964 as "a document of the mountains and the sky, as well as another profound and valid Wrightian statement of the life of man in nature". A reporter for the St. Petersburg Times called the house "an example of an interior that echoes its exterior surroundings". A writer for The Guardian said that the house demonstrated Wright's tendency to construct non-rectangular rooms and blur the distinction between indoor and outdoor spaces. A Financial Times commentator called Kentuck Knob "a homily to the hexagon", while other writers compared the shape to a ship's prow. Wright's longtime archivist Bruce Brooks Pfeiffer, who directed the Taliesin West archives, regarded Kentuck Knob as "one of the better executed of Wright's later homes". Donald Hoffmann, who wrote a book about the house, said it "occupies a special place" in Wright's portfolio because of its location, plan, and workmanship and material quality.

After Kentuck Knob opened to the public in 1996, a writer for The Daily American said that the house was "a hospitable, not formidable, estate", and a writer for The Patriot-News said that the house had a timeless aura because of "the forward-looking nature of Wright's design". Another critic, for the Richmond Times-Dispatch, regarded the house as having a "serene setting" and said the design muddied the boundary between indoor and outdoor spaces. A Post-Gazette writer, touring the house, described it in 2001 as having "the classiest clutter I've seen recently", despite Wright's aversion to cluttered homes. Ellen Uzelac of The Baltimore Sun wrote that the house has "a quiet quality ... a free-flowing movement and light that changes with the hour", while a writer for the Guelph Mercury said that Kentuck Knob's design exceeded that of a regular residence because it "exudes that unmistakable mania for detail, that sweeping appreciation for nature".

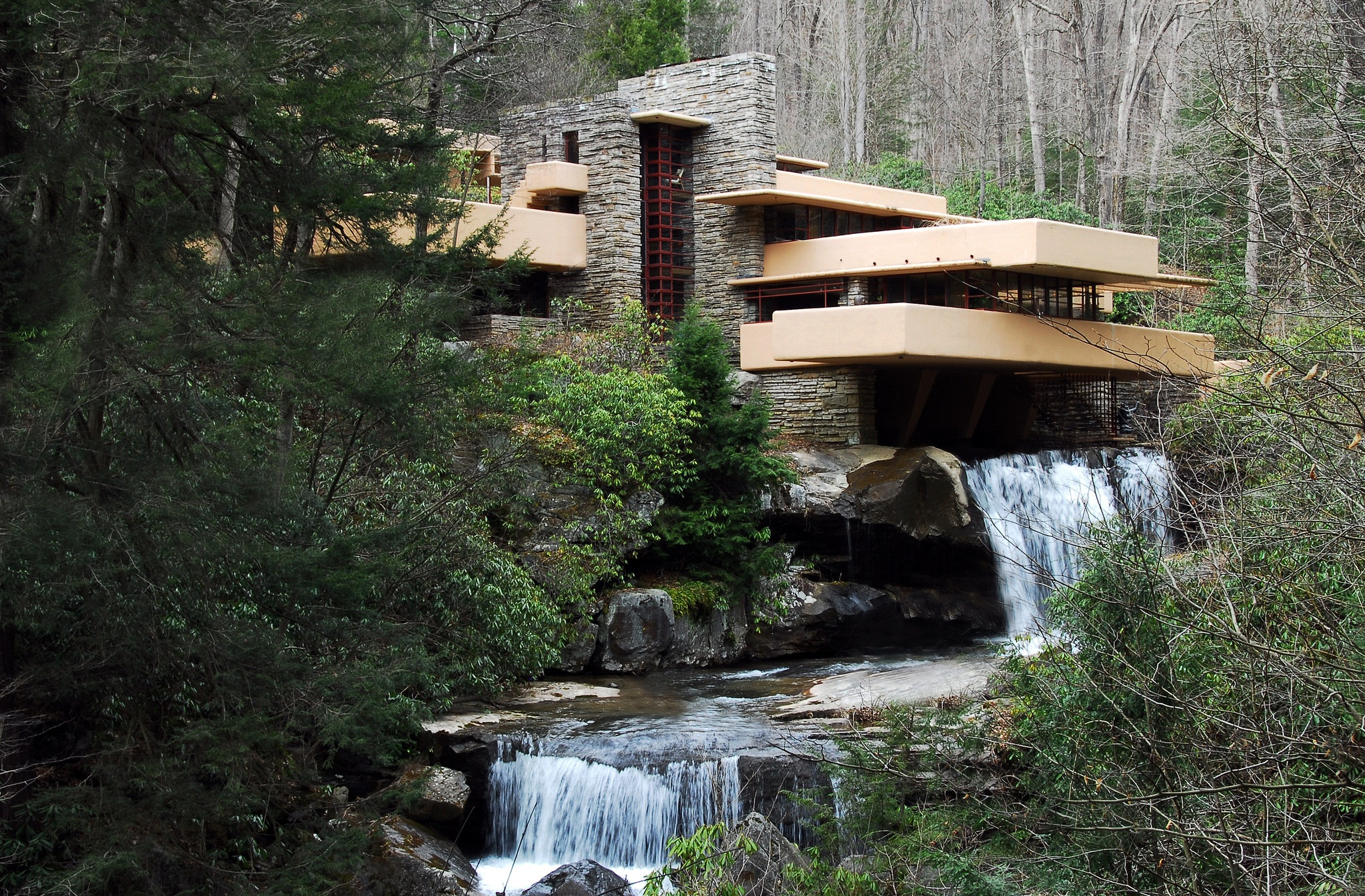
Several commentators have compared Kentuck Knob with Fallingwater.

Several commentators have compared Kentuck Knob with Fallingwater. Van Trump said in 1964 that the houses "are completely different in site, outlook and construction". A writer for the Central New Jersey Home News said that the house was smaller in scale and cozier, while Fallingwater was more akin to a palace. The Pittsburgh Post-Gazette wrote in 2001 that, whereas Fallingwater was good for entertaining guests, "Kentuck Knob is a house you can actually imagine yourself cooking breakfast in or folding laundry while you watch TV". Other writers described Kentuck Knob as being cozy and welcoming compared with Fallingwater. A New York Times reporter said that, despite being "less spectacular", Kentuck Knob was "a gem designed with Wright's trademark ingenuity". Another Times writer said it still had many noteworthy design details and was less crowded. Lord Palumbo personally believed that Fallingwater was "the greater house, but it lacks the human dimension" compared to his own residence.

=== Media ===
In 2000, the house was detailed in Donald Hoffman's book Frank Lloyd Wright's House on Kentuck Knob, which features more than 50 images and diagrams of the house. Bernardine Hagan wrote a memoir about the house's development and her experiences living there, writing a draft during mid-1997 while she was in Chautauqua, New York. Hagan's book was published in 2005 and includes photographs taken throughout the house's history, as well as documents relating to Kentuck Knob, such as copies of the family's correspondence with Wright.

After Kentuck Knob was completed, Wright used local stone and tidewater cypress in some of his later designs. The hexagonal floor grid was also emulated in other Wright-designed structures; for example, in 1953 Wright created an apartment for Edgar Kaufmann Sr. with a hexagonal grid. In addition, the copper roof and stone facade of the Nemacolin Woodlands Resort allude to the materials used in Kentuck Knob's design.

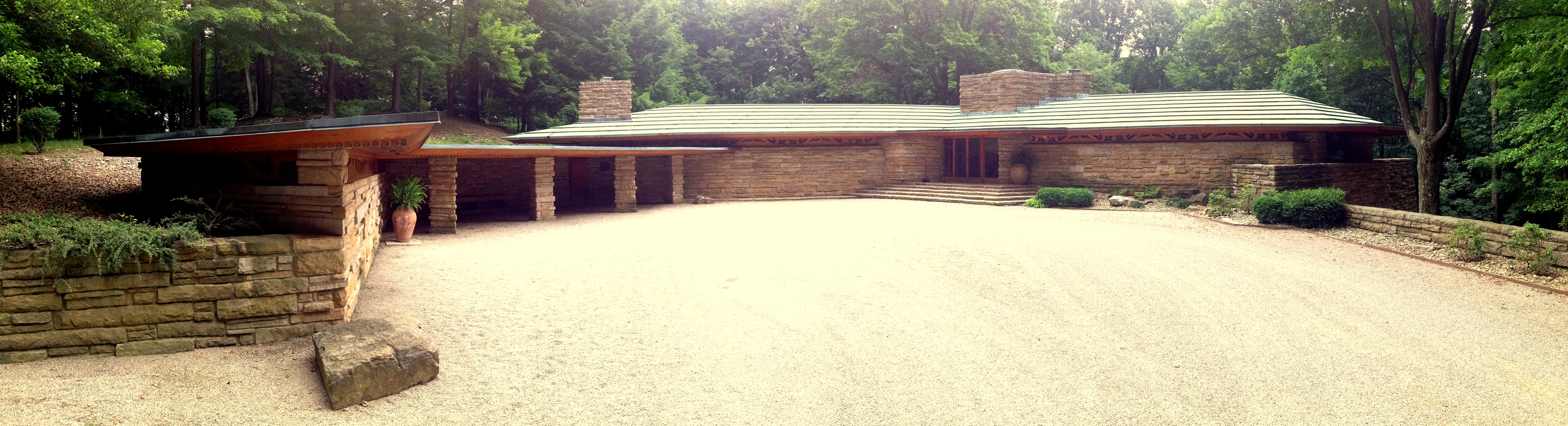
Kentuck Knob from front

== See also ==
- List of National Historic Landmarks in Pennsylvania
- National Register of Historic Places listings in Fayette County, Pennsylvania
- List of Frank Lloyd Wright works
