= Peter and Jonathan Newmyer Farm =

- U.S. National Register of Historic Places
- U.S. Historic district
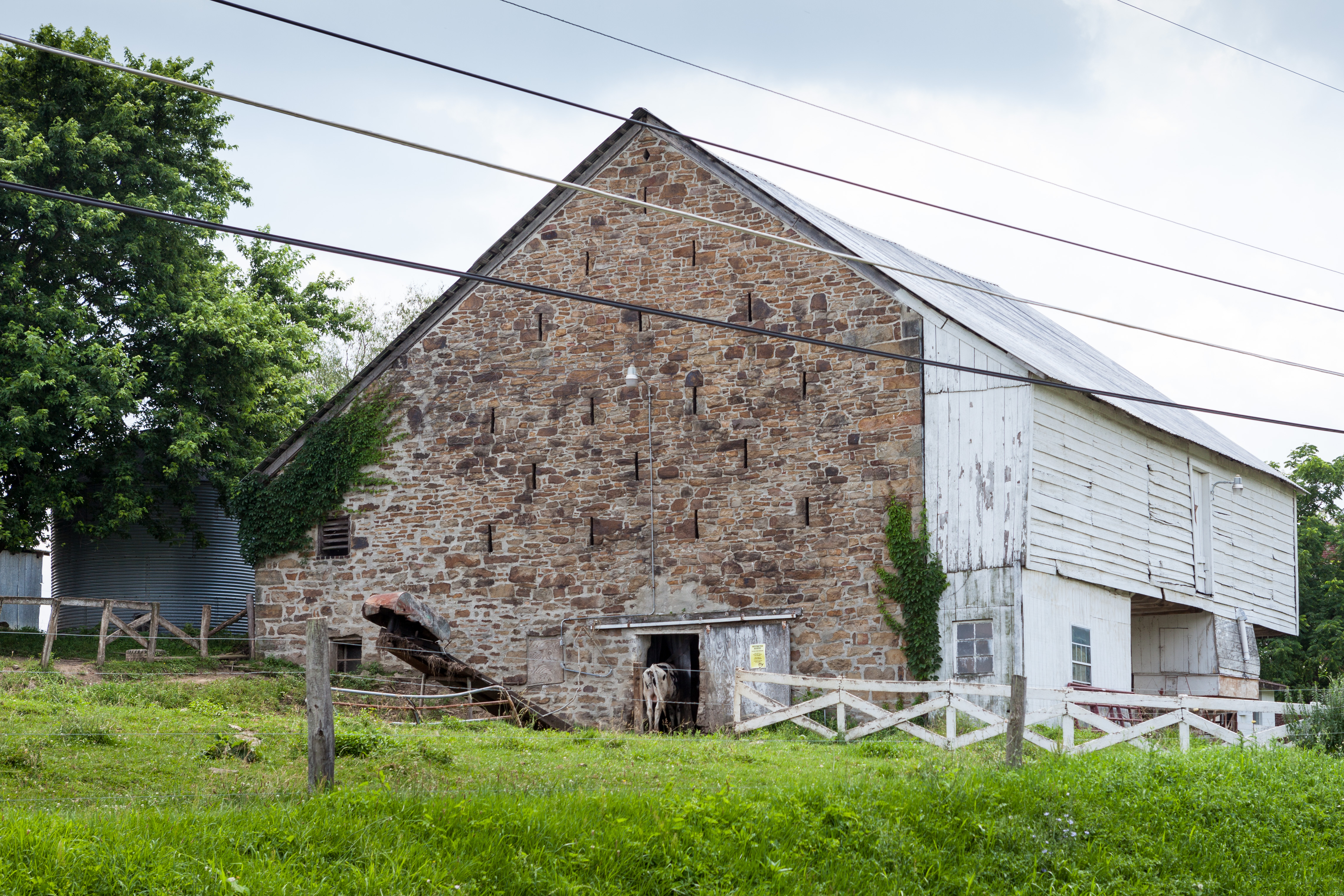
- The main barn in June 2014

- Location within Pennsylvania Location within the United States
- Location: 3165 Richey Rd., Bullskin Township, Pennsylvania
- Coordinates: 40°04′35″N 79°33′32″W
- Area: 54 acres (22 ha)
- Built: 1794
- Architectural style: Federal
- NRHP reference No.: 98000901
- Added to NRHP: July 23, 1998

The Peter and Jonathan Newmyer Farm is an historic farm and national historic district that is located in Bullskin Township, Fayette County, Pennsylvania, United States.

This property was added to the National Register of Historic Places in 1998, and is home to one of the earliest stone barns in Western Pennsylvania.

== History and architectural features ==
This district includes eight contributing buildings and one contributing structure. They are the main German bank barn (c. 1794-1798), the main house (c. 1812-1822), a straw/hay shed (c. 1900), a corn crib (c. 1875-1900), a smokehouse, a stone spring house, a coal shanty (c. 1875-1900), a wheat shed (c. 1900-1940), and a tenant house (pre-1840).

As of 2011, it was owned by Tony Mucha and his wife Rose.
