= Bullskin Township, Pennsylvania =

Township in Pennsylvania, US

Coordinates: 40°05′00″N 79°31′59″W

Bullskin Township
- Township
- The Old Mill (c. 1790)

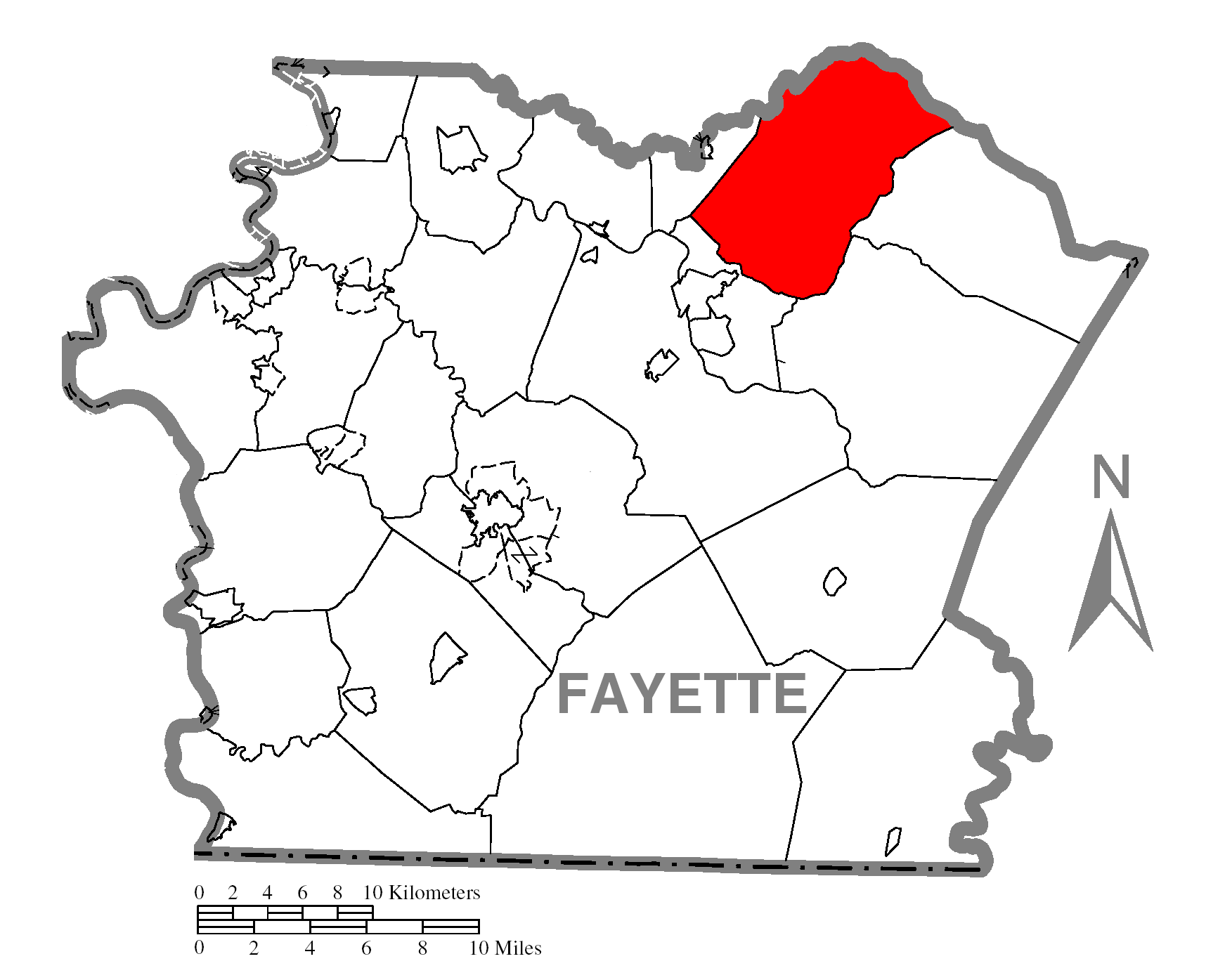
- Location of Bullskin Township in Fayette County

- Location of Fayette County in Pennsylvania
- Country: United States
- State: Pennsylvania
- County: Fayette

Area
  - Total: 43.64 sq mi (113.02 km^{2})
  - Land: 43.53 sq mi (112.75 km^{2})
  - Water: 0.10 sq mi (0.27 km^{2})

Population (2020)
  - Total: 6,741 ▼
  - Estimate (2022): 6,589
  - Density: 155.6/sq mi (60.06/km^{2})
- Time zone: UTC-4 (EST)
  - Summer (DST): UTC-5 (EDT)
- Area code: 724
- FIPS code: 42-051-10152

Bullskin Township is a township in Fayette County, Pennsylvania, United States. The population was 6,741 at the 2020 census, a decline from the figure of 6,966 tabulated in 2010. It is served by the Connellsville Area School District.

The settlements of Poplar Grove, Moyer, Prittstown, Pennsville, Bear Rocks, Breakneck, Hammondville, and Wooddale are all located within the township.

== History ==
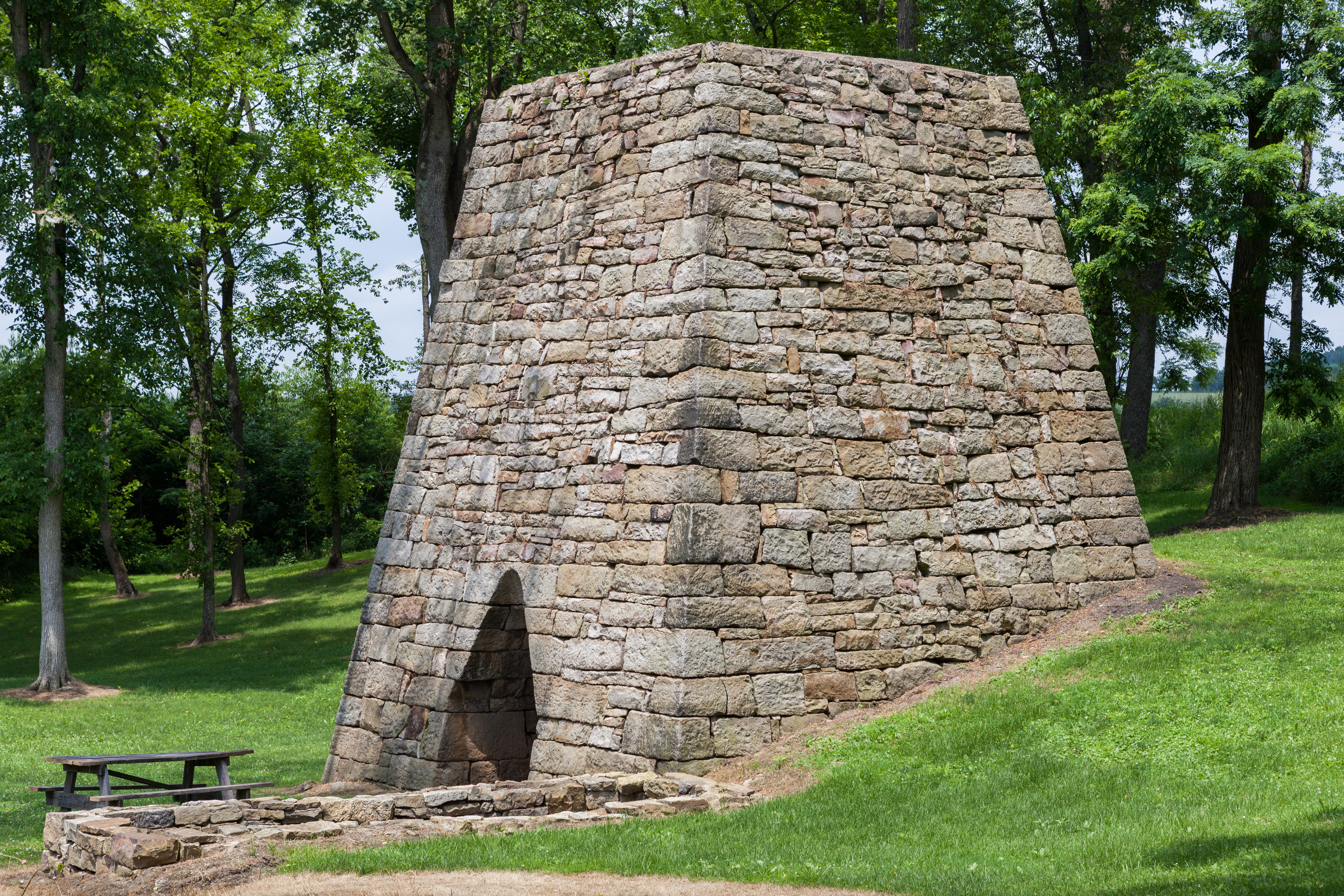
Mount Vernon Furnace on Eutsey Road

The township was formed in 1784. However, Europeans visited and settled in the area earlier. The Braddock Road, built by British troops and Virginia militia in 1755, runs along what is now the township's western boundary. The Braddock expedition camped near what was then known as the John Truxell Farm on the night of July 1, 1755.

The Mount Vernon Furnace and Peter and Jonathan Newmyer Farm are listed on the National Register of Historic Places.

Greenlick Run Lake is located on Mudd School Road in Bullskin. It is a man-made lake that was formed as a result of the Water Shed Protection and Flood Preservation Act of 1972. On the night of July 1, 1755, General Edward Braddock and his troops camped near the Junick Farm, located across the road from the reservoir’s breast. This site became known as "The Great Swamp Camp." The swamp, which extended on both sides of Jacobs Creek, required significant effort to traverse. To advance, Braddock’s forces constructed a corduroy road over the swamp. This is the first documentation of the area and is retold on a plaque placed near the reservoir's park. The area remained a swamp for the next 200 years before the Water Shed Protection and Flood Preservation Act of 1972 was instated.

The reservoir park, located on Mudd School Road near Paradise Church off Route 982, was established on land once occupied by numerous farms. The park features several amenities, including picnic pavilions, a ballfield, and a large grassy area surrounding the reservoir. Visitors can fish and boat, with regulations allowing only electric motors on the water.

== Geography ==
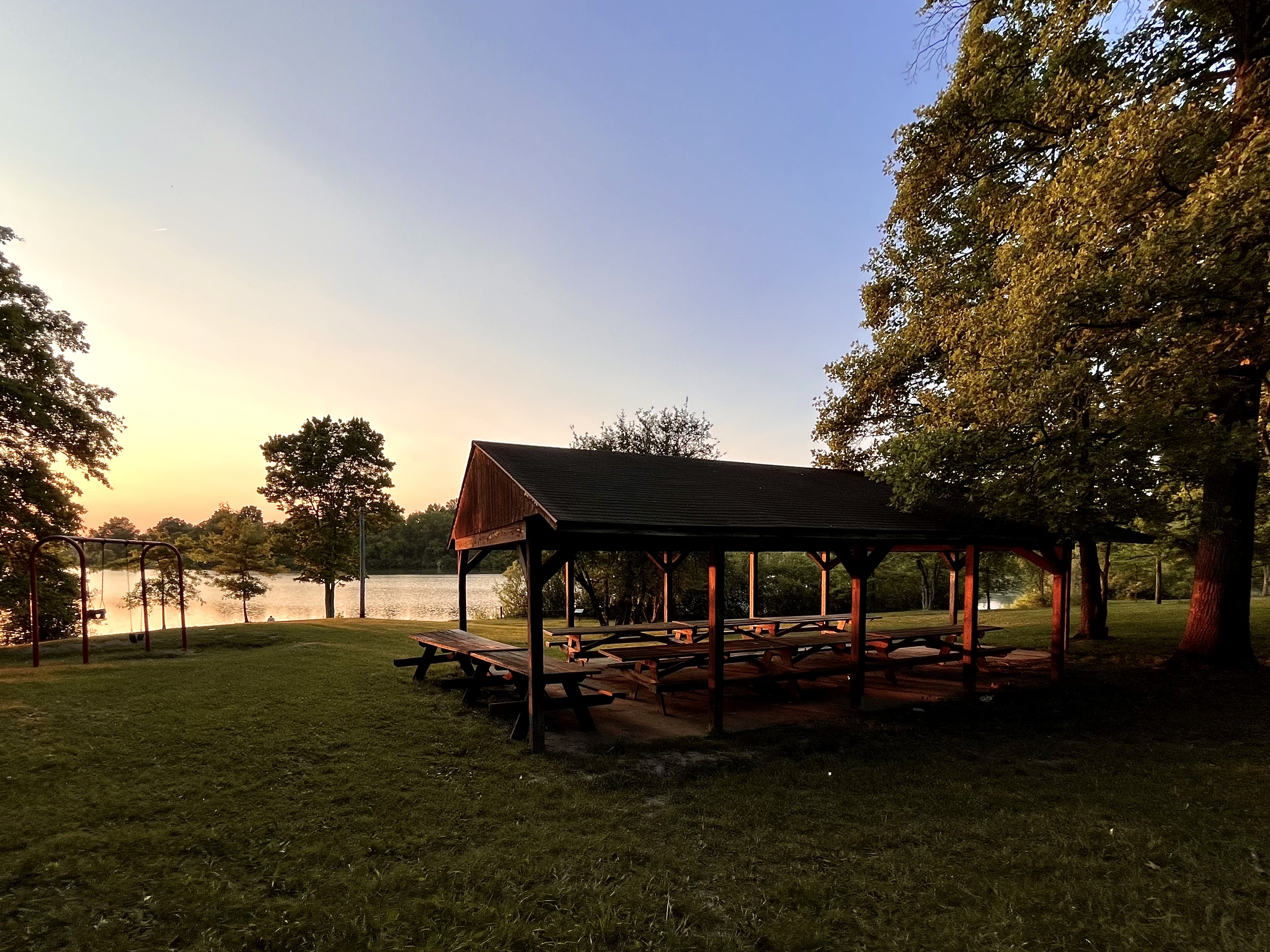
Greenlick Run Dam lake and park in 2023

Bullskin Township is in northeastern Fayette County, bordered to the north by Westmoreland County. The eastern border of the township follows the crest of Chestnut Ridge, reaching elevations of 2,340 feet (710 m) above sea level. According to the United States Census Bureau, the township has a total area of 43.64 square miles (113.02 km^{2}), of which 43.53 square miles (112.75 km^{2}) is land and 0.11 square miles (0.272 km^{2}), or 0.24%, is water.

U.S. Route 119 crosses the western side of the township, leading north to Greensburg and south to Connellsville. Pennsylvania Route 982 (Pleasant Valley Road) runs from US-119 north along the western base of Chestnut Ridge to Pennsylvania Route 31 at the township's northern boundary. PA 31 leads west to Mount Pleasant and east to Donegal.

== Demographics ==
Historical population
Census	Pop.	Note	%±
2010	6,966		—
2020	6,741		−3.2%
2022 (est.)	6,589		−2.3%
U.S. Decennial Census

As of the 2000 census, there were 7,782 people, 3,023 households, and 2,279 families residing in the township. The population density was 179.4 inhabitants per square mile (69.3/km^{2}). There were 3,206 housing units at an average density of 73.9 per square mile (28.5/km^{2}). The racial makeup of the township was 99.36% White, 0.05% African American, 0.09% Native American, 0.17% Asian, 0.04% Pacific Islander, 0.10% from other races, and 0.19% from two or more races. Hispanic or Latino of any race were 0.17% of the population.

There were 3,023 households, out of which 31.8% had children under the age of 18 living with them, 63.3% were married couples living together, 7.9% had a female householder with no husband present, and 24.6% were non-families. 21.3% of all households were made up of individuals, and 9.1% had someone living alone who was 65 years of age or older. The average household size was 2.57 and the average family size was 2.98.

In the township the population was spread out, with 22.8% under the age of 18, 7.6% from 18 to 24, 30.1% from 25 to 44, 26.2% from 45 to 64, and 13.2% who were 65 years of age or older. The median age was 39 years. For every 100 females, there were 102.8 males. For every 100 females age 18 and over, there were 100.1 males.

The median income for a household in the township was $32,059, and the median income for a family was $40,259. Males had a median income of $32,133 versus $21,737 for females. The per capita income for the township was $16,719. About 9.0% of families and 11.2% of the population were below the poverty line, including 11.6% of those under age 18 and 9.4% of those age 65 or over.

== See also ==
- Bullskin Township/Connellsville Township Joint Sewage Authority
