= Bear Rocks, Pennsylvania =

Unincorporated community in Pennsylvania, US

- Census-designated place
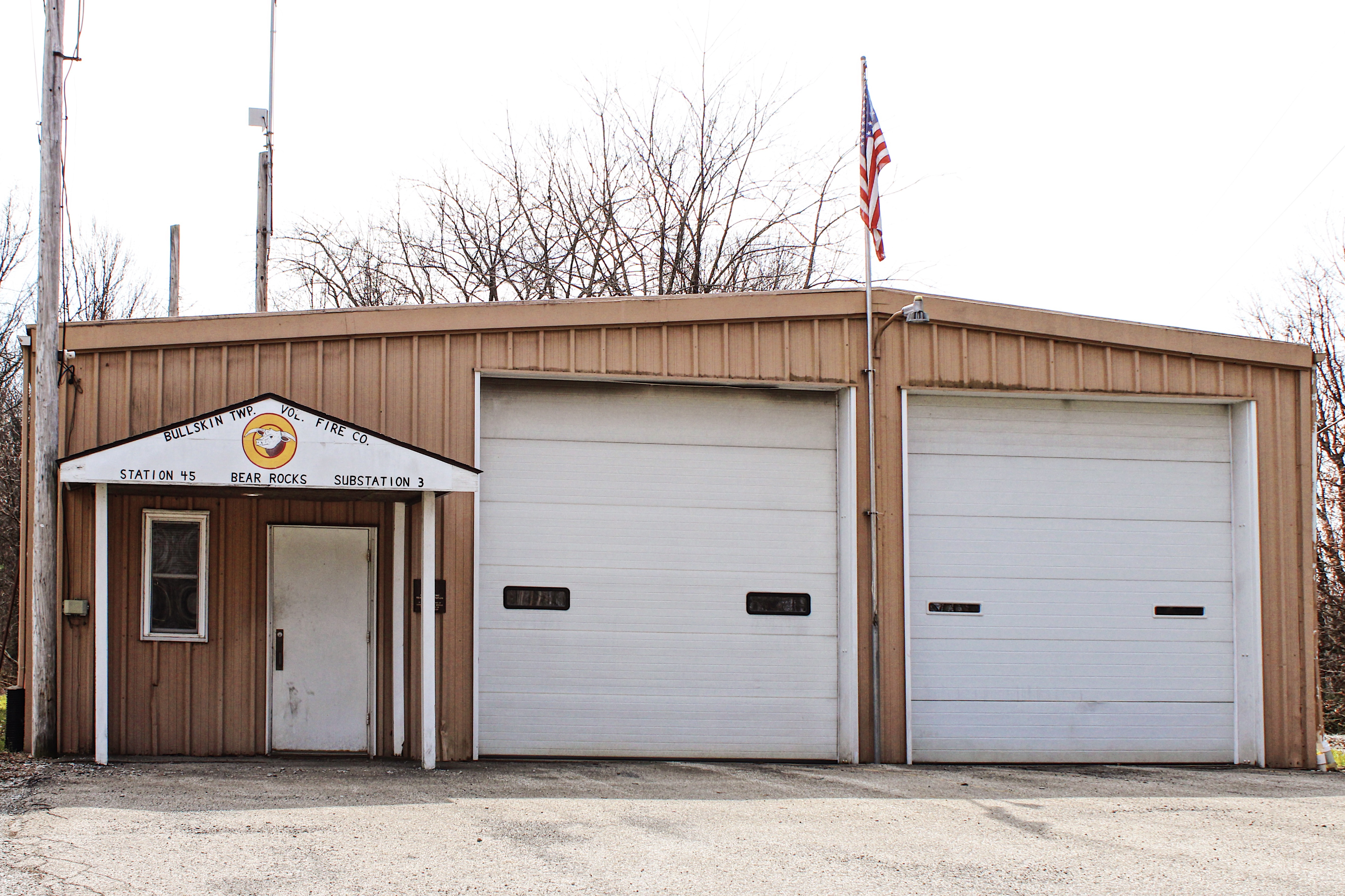
- Bear Rocks volunteer fire department substation

- Location within Pennsylvania Location within the United States
- Coordinates: 40°07′35″N 79°27′54″W
- Country: United States
- State: Pennsylvania
- County: Fayette
- Township: Bullskin

Area
  - Total: 3.24 sq mi (8.39 km^{2})
  - Land: 3.24 sq mi (8.39 km^{2})
  - Water: 0 sq mi (0.00 km^{2})
- Elevation: 1,847 ft (563 m)

Population (2020)
  - Total: 1,005
  - Density: 310.4/sq mi (119.84/km^{2})
- Time zone: UTC-5 (Eastern (EST))
  - Summer (DST): UTC-4 (EDT)
- FIPS code: 42-04616
- GNIS feature ID: 2633768

Bear Rocks is an unincorporated community and census-designated place in Bullskin Township, Fayette County, Pennsylvania, United States. As of the 2020 census, Bear Rocks had a population of 1,005. It is located along the south side of Pennsylvania Route 31 in northern Fayette County, on the western slope of Chestnut Ridge.

== Geography ==
The elevation ranges from 1,150 feet (350 m) above sea level at the northwestern end of the community, in the valley of Jacobs Creek, to 2,196 feet (669 m) near the southeastern corner of the community, at the intersection of Kreinbrook Hill Road and Sky Top Road.

Hikers can access the nearby Appalachian Trail via a side trail from Bear Rocks.

== History ==
In 1977, Bear Rocks was the site of a controversial murder investigation. A local man, David Munchinski, was found guilty of the crime and served 26 years in prison. He was later found to have been wrongfully convicted and was released.

== Demographics ==
As of the 2010 census, the population of the CDP was 1,048.

Historical population
Census	Pop.	Note	%±
2020	1,005		—
U.S. Decennial Census
