= Mount Vernon Furnace =

- U.S. National Register of Historic Places
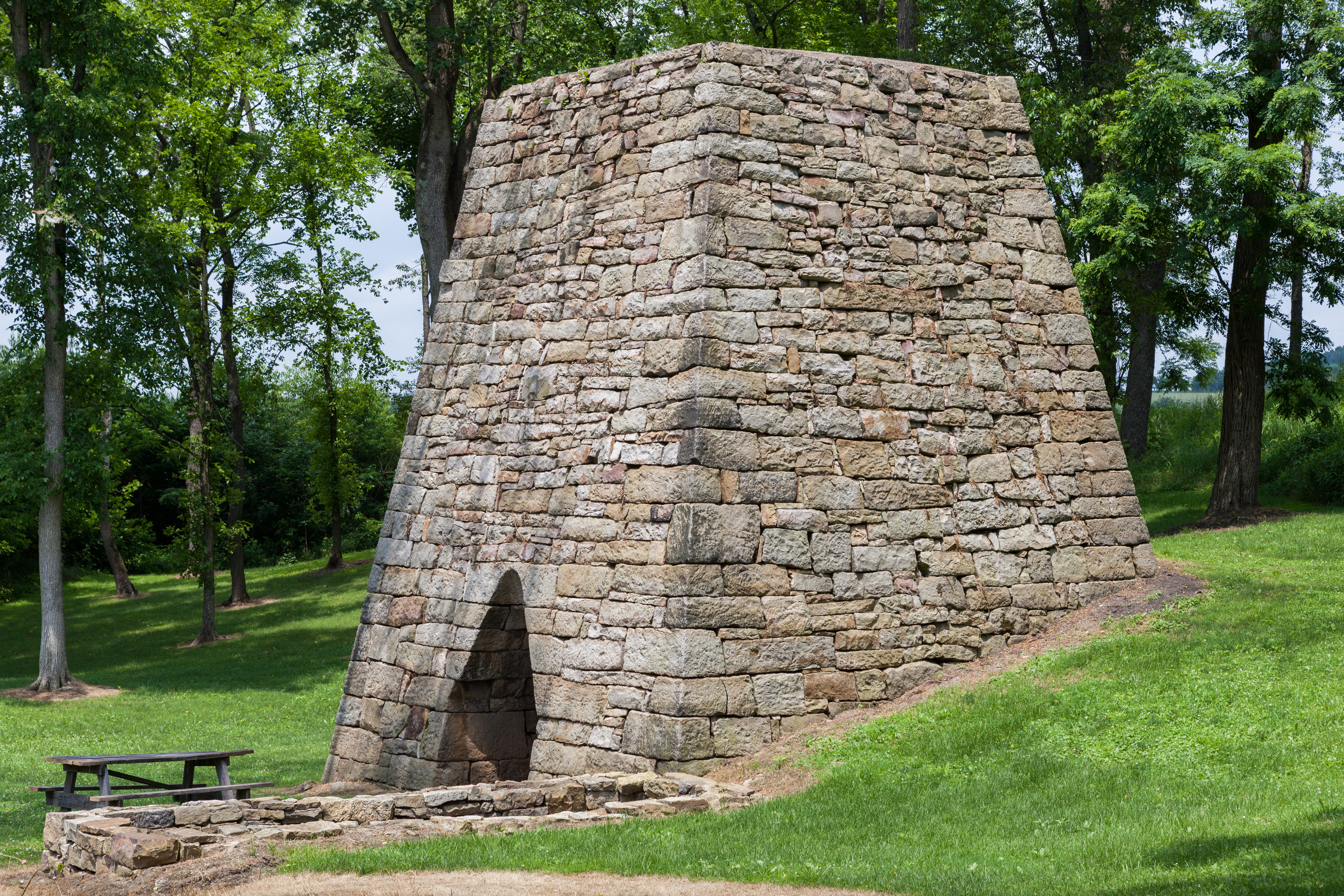
- South and east sides, June 2014

- Location within Pennsylvania Location within the United States
- Location: Entsey Road east of Pennsylvania Route 982, east of Scottdale, Bullskin Township, Pennsylvania
- Coordinates: 40°5′45″N 79°30′38″W
- Area: less than one acre
- Built: 1795
- Architectural style: Iron furnace
- MPS: Iron and Steel Resources of Pennsylvania MPS
- NRHP reference No.: 91001127
- Added to NRHP: September 6, 1991

Mount Vernon Furnace, also known as Jacob's Creek Furnace and Alliance Iron Works, is a historic iron furnace located at Eutsey Road in Bullskin Township, Fayette County, Pennsylvania. Built by Isaac Meason Sr. in 1795 and rebuilt in 1801, it is a stone structure measuring 24 feet square and 30 feet high, with two arches. It was built as a blast furnace and went out of blast in 1825.

It was added to the National Register of Historic Places in 1991.
