= Laurel Caverns =

Cave in Pennsylvania, United States

Coordinates: 39.79961°N 79.71161°W

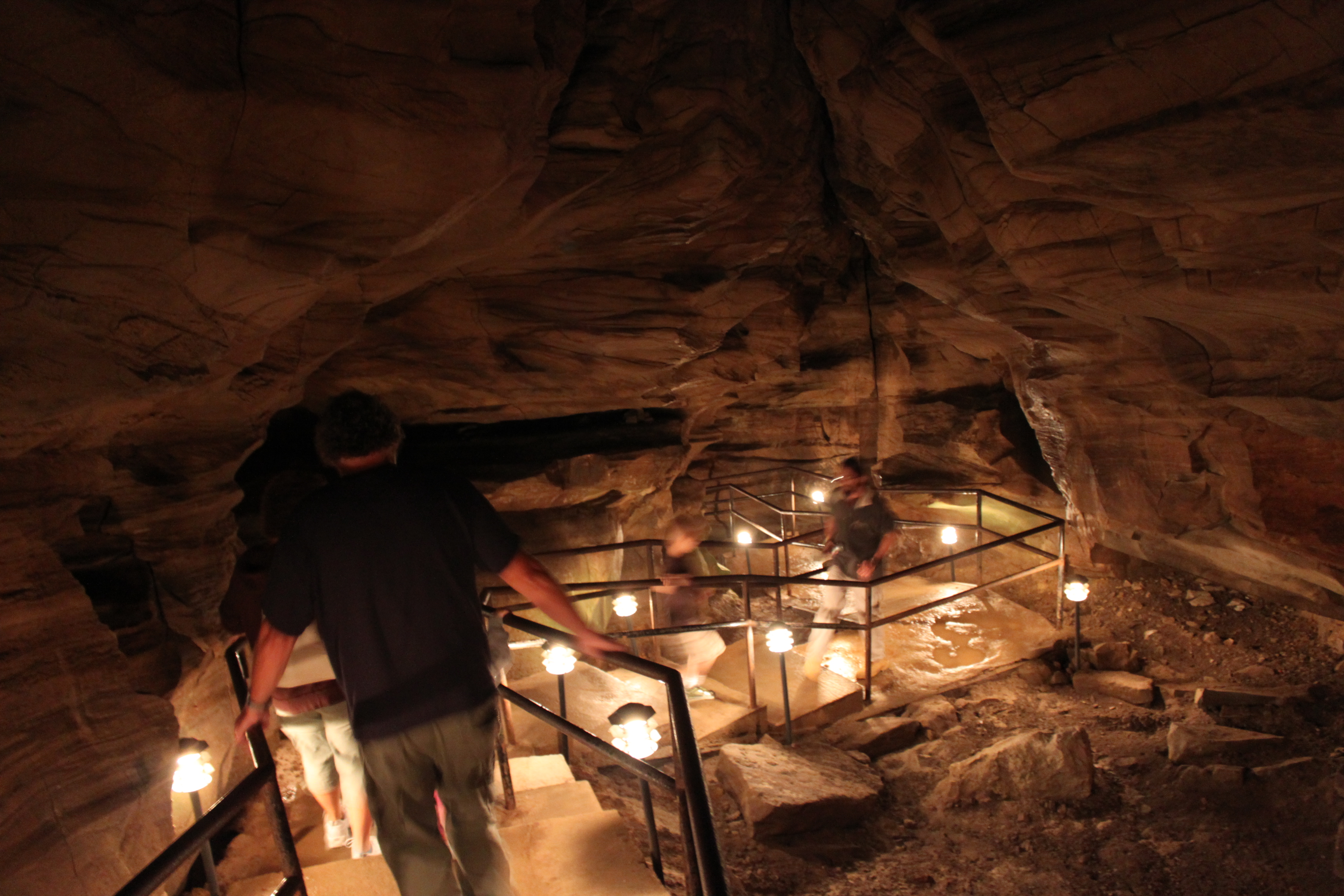
- Stairs, lit with electric lights, lead into the cavern.
- Interactive map of Laurel Caverns
- Location: Farmington, Pennsylvania
- Length: 4,972 meters (16,312 ft)
- Discovery: 1760s (first recorded exploration)
- Geology: Karst cave Mississippian Loyalhanna limestone
- Access: Adults: $15 USD; Seniors (65+): $12 USD; Children (12-18): $10 USD; Children (6-11): $10 USD; Children (0-5): free Upper Caving (9 and up): $20 USD; Lower Caving (12 and up): $25 USD

Laurel Caverns is the largest cave in the Commonwealth of Pennsylvania by volume and area. Located in the community of Farmington, it sits on Chestnut Ridge near Uniontown, roughly 50 miles (80 km) southeast of Pittsburgh.

Initially an unregulated wild cave that was known by locals and word of mouth as "Dulany's Cave" (alternate spelling: "Dulaney's Cave") during the early 1900s, it was owned, during the 1930s, by Norman Cale and his brother, and then later by Cale and his wife, Helen, who opened it to the general public as a show cave on July 1, 1964, and marketed it as "the caverns in the clouds".

In 2025, Pennsylvania Governor Josh Shapiro proposed turning Laurel Caverns into a state park. David and Lilian Cale, who created the Laurel Caverns Conservancy, then donated the property to the Commonwealth of Pennsylvania, and on April 6, 2026, Gov. Shapiro officially announced the grand opening of Laurel Caverns State Park. Laurel Caverns became Pennsylvania's 125th State Park, and its first underground.

== History ==
=== Early history ===
Named after Thomas Dulany, the early nineteenth-century owner of the land where the cave was located and first achieved local prominence, Dulany Cave (alternate spelling: "Dulaney's Cave") was reportedly first explored on September 11, 1816, by a party of six men. Headed by John A. Paxton of Philadelphia, that party "tried all passages, even those so small that they had to wriggle or crawl to get through". Describing the last section reached by the team, Paxton described it as the cave's largest, adding:

"This we found to be very spacious, being from 20 to 30 feet wide, from 30 to 80 feet from the floor to the roof, and 1,200 feet in length, with a stream sufficient to turn a grist-mill running its full length. We measured with a line the extreme distance we had been in, and found it to be 3,600 feet, but we must have traveled altogether upwards of two miles."

Still known by locals as "Dulany's Cave" in 1915, it remained an unregulated wild cave well into the 1950s. Even so, by the 1930s, it was a popular attraction for church groups and visiting guests of area residents, who arranged for tours headed by Don Helmick and other knowledgeable guides.

Owned by Uniontown brothers Norman and Roy Cale, beginning sometime around the 1930s, the land near the cavern became the subject of historical research regarding the eighteenth-century operation of Fort Contrechoeur, a stockade that had been erected by the French between 1747 and 1748 during the French and Indian Wars.

By the 1940s, Halloween-themed events were being held inside the cave, billed as opportunities to "explore the dark caverns with the live bats that fly from one end of the cave to the other".

=== Show cave ===
During the mid-1950s, the Cales began exploring ways to convert the wild cave into a for-profit tourist attraction. Norman Cale, now in collaboration with his wife Helen, officially opened the cave to the general public as a show cave on July 1, 1964. The Cales marketed it as "the caverns in the clouds."

Later in 1964, Norman Cale sold the property to Emmett J. Boyle Jr. and Ned J. Nakles, two lawyers from Greensburg and Latrobe. Boyle and Nakles made several safety and entertainment value-related improvements, including the installation of roughly twenty-five miles of electrical cable that supported a new theatrical lighting system.

David Cale, Norman Cale's grandson, became a part-owner of the property in 1973. In 1986, David and his wife, Lillian, founded the nonprofit Laurel Caverns Conservancy to manage operations.

=== Laurel Caverns State Park ===
The Cales had long supported the idea of state park designation to help conserve the cave. In February 2025, Gov. Josh Shapiro proposed designating Laurel Caverns as a state park. David and Lillian Cale were receptive and donated the property to the Commonwealth. On April 6, 2026, Laurel Caverns State Park officially opened as Pennsylvania's 125th state park and its first underground.

== Notable features ==
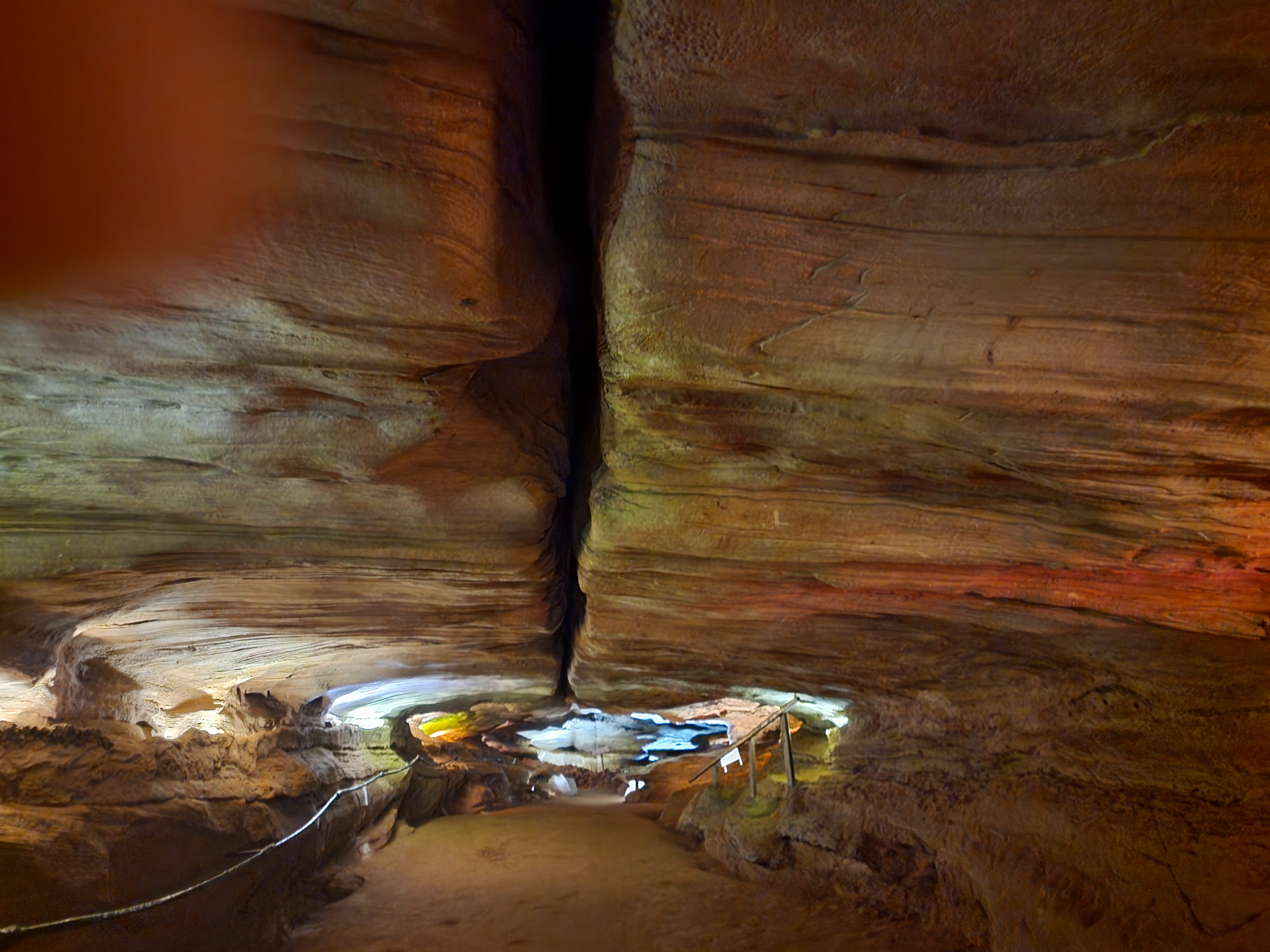
Passageway in Laurel Caverns

This cavern features an array of speleological and pseudokarsts formations. Its average temperature is 52 °F (11 °C).

Split into two sections, the entrance into the upper cavern is a network of interconnecting grid-like passages, while its unlit lower cavern, known as its branch-work, consists of subterranean watercourses that flow into a dendritic system of passages.

The steep slope of some passageways on this tour causes an optical illusion known as a gravity hill, similar to the illusion of a ball rolling uphill.

== Recreation ==
Operators offer a three-hour tour, which includes gravity hill, as well as the cavern's lower branchwork, which is unlit. Because the terrain remains unaltered here, cavern rules require visitors to use helmets and lighting when climbing or crawling over breakdown piles or other obstructions to reach the caverns' chambers and chasmal courses.

The cavern grounds also offer visitors access to a gift shop, mini-golf course, the opportunity to pan for gemstones, and fossil-study activities, and also serve as a wildlife viewing locale during operations to tourists. As a popular destination for school field trips, the cavern's owners have adopted a no firearms policy.
