= Chestnut Ridge (Laurel Highlands) =

Mountain in Pennsylvania, United States

Coordinates: 40°14′00″N 79°21′59″W

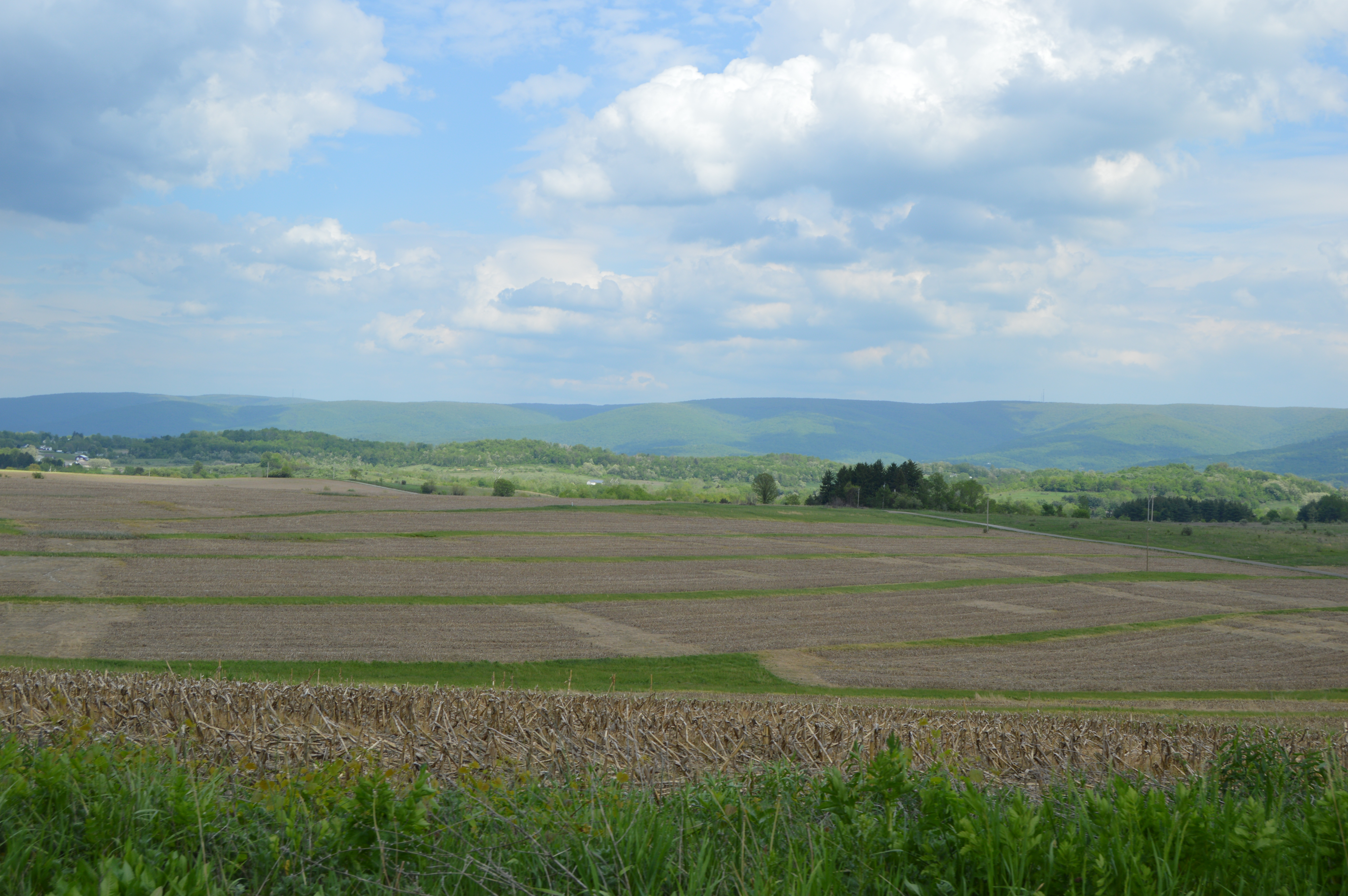
Fields south of Uniontown, with the western side of Chestnut Ridge in the background

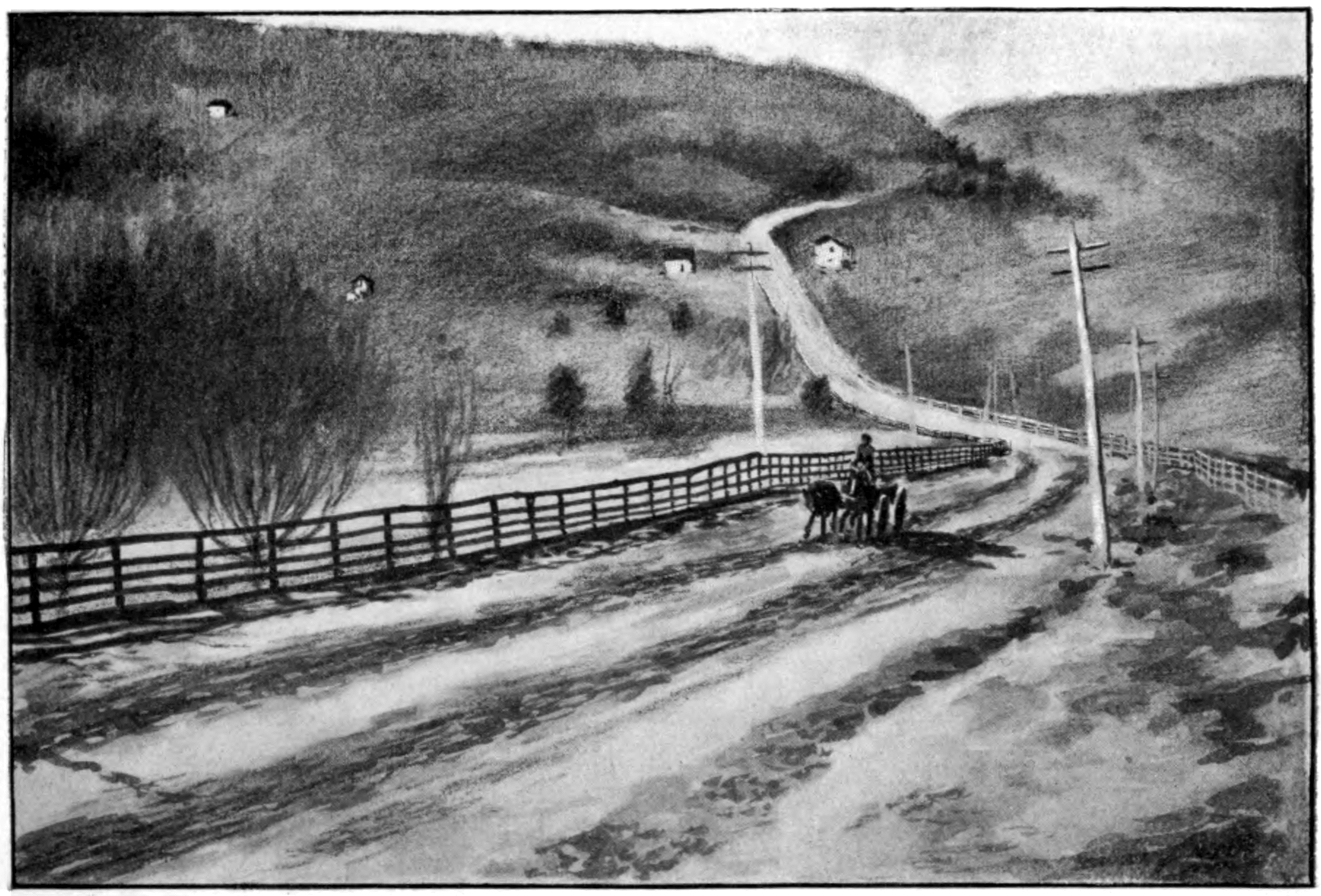
Chestnut Ridge, Pennsylvania. Source: Archer Butler Hulbert, Historic Highways of America Vol. 10.

Chestnut Ridge is the westernmost ridge of the Allegheny Mountains in Pennsylvania, United States. It is located primarily within the Laurel Highlands region of southwestern Pennsylvania, extending into northern West Virginia.

== Geography ==
Chestnut Ridge rises in southern Indiana County with an altitude of 2,000 feet above sea level and continues to the south-southwest for approximately 75 miles. It crosses Westmoreland County, where Loyalhanna Creek cuts a deep gorge through the ridge. It continues through Fayette County where the Youghiogheny River cuts a winding gorge through the ridge before heading into West Virginia, gradually disappearing into a series of hills and finally ending roughly 5 miles (8.0 km) southeast of Morgantown, West Virginia.

In Pennsylvania, Chestnut Ridge passes near the cities of Blairsville, Derry, and Latrobe, where its altitude is about 2,000-2,700 feet above sea level, and continues on to Mt. Pleasant, Connellsville, and Uniontown.

The highest elevation of the ridge is southeast of Uniontown located at the Pondfield Headquarters fire tower, just past Laurel Caverns where its altitude is 2,778 feet above sea level.

On a clear day, it is possible to see West Virginia, Maryland, and Pittsburgh from the fire tower, scenic overlook, and the cross at Jumonville, approximately 5 miles east of Uniontown.

== History ==
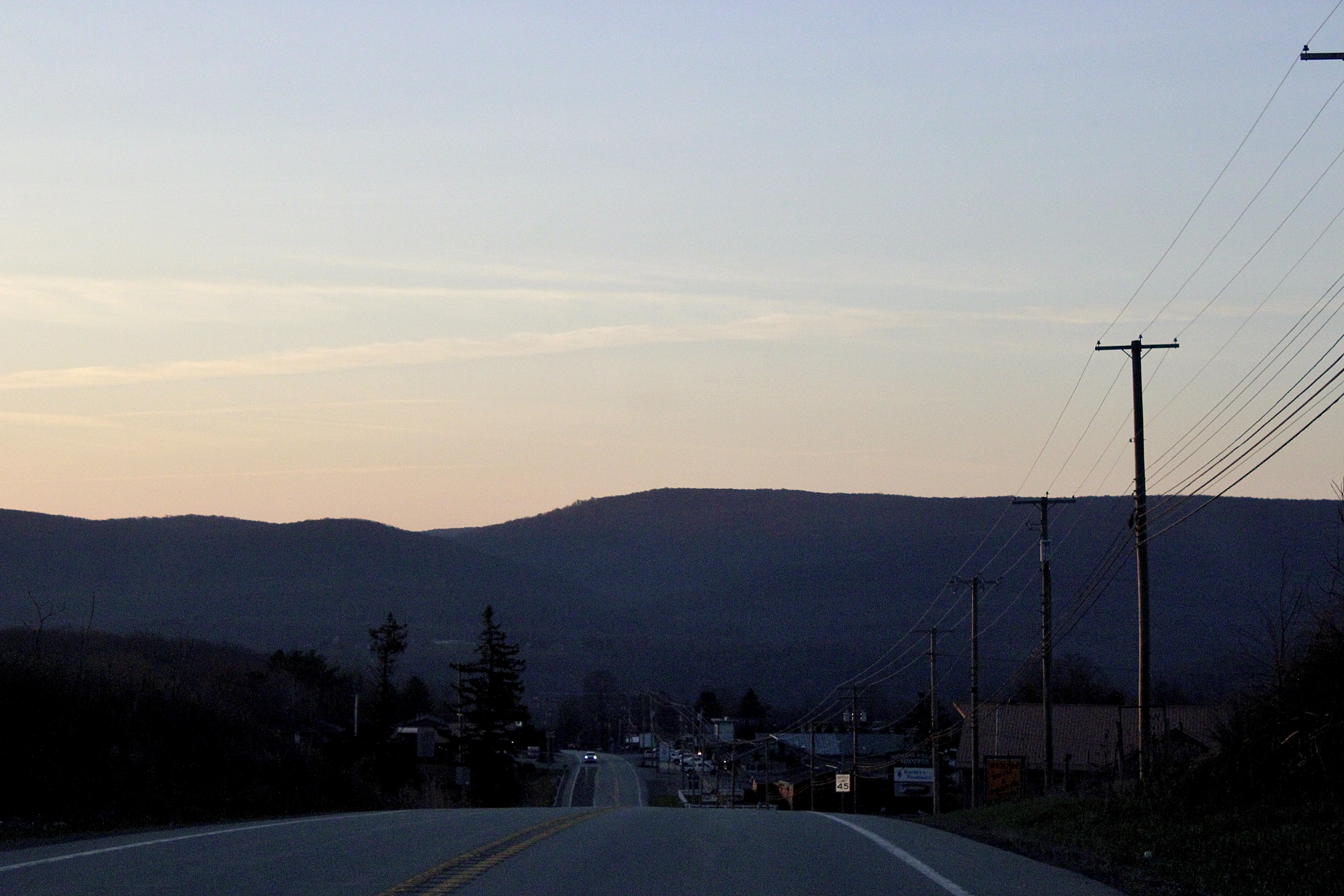
Chestnut Ridge, as seen from Donegal, PA

The Chestnut Ridge people (also known as Guineas) take their name from this region.

The ridge is named for the American chestnut that once covered its slopes in abundance before succumbing to blight in the 20th century. During the time the chestnut was dominant along the ridge, it was said that the ridge appeared snow covered in May and June as the trees were displaying white blossoms, notably from the male catkins.

The area is known as "The Twilight Zone of Pennsylvania" due to alleged sightings of the mythical creature Bigfoot and other supposedly paranormal events.

== Ecology, Flora & Fauna ==
Located within the Appalachian mixed mesophytic forests ecoregion, Chestnut Ridge is a mosaic of different forest communities that reflect its varied topography and climate. On the lower slopes and valleys, mesic plants thrive, consisting of tuliptree, sugar maple, beech, basswood, cucumber-tree, sweet birch, black walnut, and a diverse understory featuring wood nettle and rhododendron. Upper slopes and ridgetops are dominated by northern red oak, chestnut oak, shagbark hickory, red maple, and sprouts of American chestnut with an understory consisting of hay-scented fern, northern maidenhair fern, and mountain laurel. Cool ravines and shaded hollows of northern slopes support northern hardwoods, featuring eastern hemlock, white pine, sugar maple, beech, yellow birch, black cherry, and sprouts of American chestnut. The ridge also supports a wide range of wildlife, including white-tailed deer, wild turkey, red fox, chipmunks, coyote, American black bear, skunk, timber rattlesnake, and bobcat.
