= Laurel =

Laurel may refer to:

== Plants ==
- Lauraceae, the laurel family
- Laurel (plant), including a list of trees and plants known as laurel

== People ==
- Laurel (given name), people with the given name
- Laurel (surname), people with the surname
- Laurel (musician), British indie musician Laurel Arnell-Cullen (born 1994)

== Places ==
=== United States ===
- Laurel, California, a ghost town
- Laurel, Oakland, California, a neighborhood of Oakland
- Laurel, Delaware, a town
- Laurel, Florida, a census-designated place
- Laurel, Indiana, a town
- Laurel Township, Franklin County, Indiana
- Laurel, Iowa, a city
- Laurel County, Kentucky
- Laurel River, Kentucky
- Laurel, Maryland, a city
- Laurel, Mississippi, a city
- Laurel micropolitan area, Mississippi
- Laurel, Montana, a city
- Laurel, Nebraska, a city
- Laurel, New York, a census-designated place
- Laurel, North Carolina, an unincorporated community
- Laurel, Ohio, an unincorporated community
- Laurel Township, Hocking County, Ohio
- Laurel, Oregon, an unincorporated community
- Laurel Highlands, Pennsylvania
- Laurel Hill, Florida, a city
- Laurel Hill (Pennsylvania), also known as Laurel Ridge or Laurel Mountain
- Laurel Lake (Cumberland County, Pennsylvania)
- Laurel, Tennessee, an unincorporated settlement
- Laurel, Virginia, a census-designated place
- Laurel, Washington, an unincorporated community
- Laurel, Barbour County, West Virginia, an unincorporated community
- Laurel Lake (Teton County, Wyoming), in Grand Teton National Park
- Laurel Mountain (disambiguation)

=== Canada ===
- Laurel, Edmonton, Alberta, a neighbourhood
- Laurel, a hamlet in the township of Amaranth, Ontario
- Laurel, a community in Wentworth-Nord, Quebec

=== Elsewhere ===
- Laurel, Batangas, Philippines, a third-class municipality
- 2865 Laurel, an asteroid

== Ships ==
- HMS Laurel, the name of several Royal Navy ships
- Laurel-class post ship, six ships used by the Royal Navy during the Napoleonic Wars
- USS Laurel (1862), a Union Navy steamer
- MV Laurel, a 1943 Cypriot ship scrapped in 1969

== Other uses ==
- Laurel (English coin)
- The Laurel, a skyscraper in Philadelphia, Pennsylvania, US
- Laurel station (disambiguation), stations of the name
- Dudley Spencer House, also known as Laurel, designed by Frank Lloyd Wright
- Laurel Films, a film production company
- Nissan Laurel, a car
- Laurel Awards
- Laurel High School (disambiguation)
- Laurel (LDS Church), the name for teenage members of the LDS Young Women's organization
- "Laurel", a song by Goldfrapp from Tales of Us
- Laurel and Yanny, an acoustic illusion that went viral on social media in 2018.

== See also ==
- Laureles (disambiguation)
- Laurel Fork (disambiguation)
- Laurel wreath
- Laure (disambiguation)
- Laurell, a name
- Laurels (Laurus nobilis), in the flowering plant family Lauraceae
- Lauryl, a dodecyl hydrocarbon chain
