= Roaring Run Resort =

Recreational campground in Pennsylvania, U.S.

Coordinates: 40°3′59″N 79°20′35″W

Pittsburgh Roaring Run RV Resort
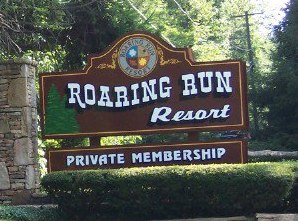
- Type: Private company
- Industry: Recreational campground
- Predecessor: Camp Aliquippa
- Founded: 1927
- Headquarters: 194 Tannery Road, Champion, Pennsylvania, United States
- Area served: Laurel Highlands, Southwestern Pennsylvania
- Key people: pittsburgh rv park
- Products: public campground
- Revenue: ▲US$2,420,000
- Number of employees: 25
- Divisions: Roaring Run Resort Club; Roaring Run Sales
- Website: pittsburghrvpark.com

Pittsburgh Roaring Run RV Resort is a recreational public campground and RV park located in the Laurel Highlands area of Southwestern Pennsylvania, between Seven Springs and Hidden Valley Golf & Ski Resort. A former Boy Scout camp dating back to the 1920s, the resort was featured in USA Today and the Pittsburgh Post-Gazette, and parts of its history have been documented in the Journal of Economic History and Pittsburgh Press. Roaring Run has the distinction of being one of the original Pennsylvania Boy Scout camps, as well as originally housing one of the oldest blast furnaces in Pennsylvania.

Many landmarks and buildings throughout the park date back to the 1920s, including The Trading Post, Hoyt Lodge (named after a benefactor, referred to as "Mr. Hoyt" in archived news coverage, who was an executive with the Jones and Laughlin Steel Company), stone buildings, and stone walls.

== Property and Region ==
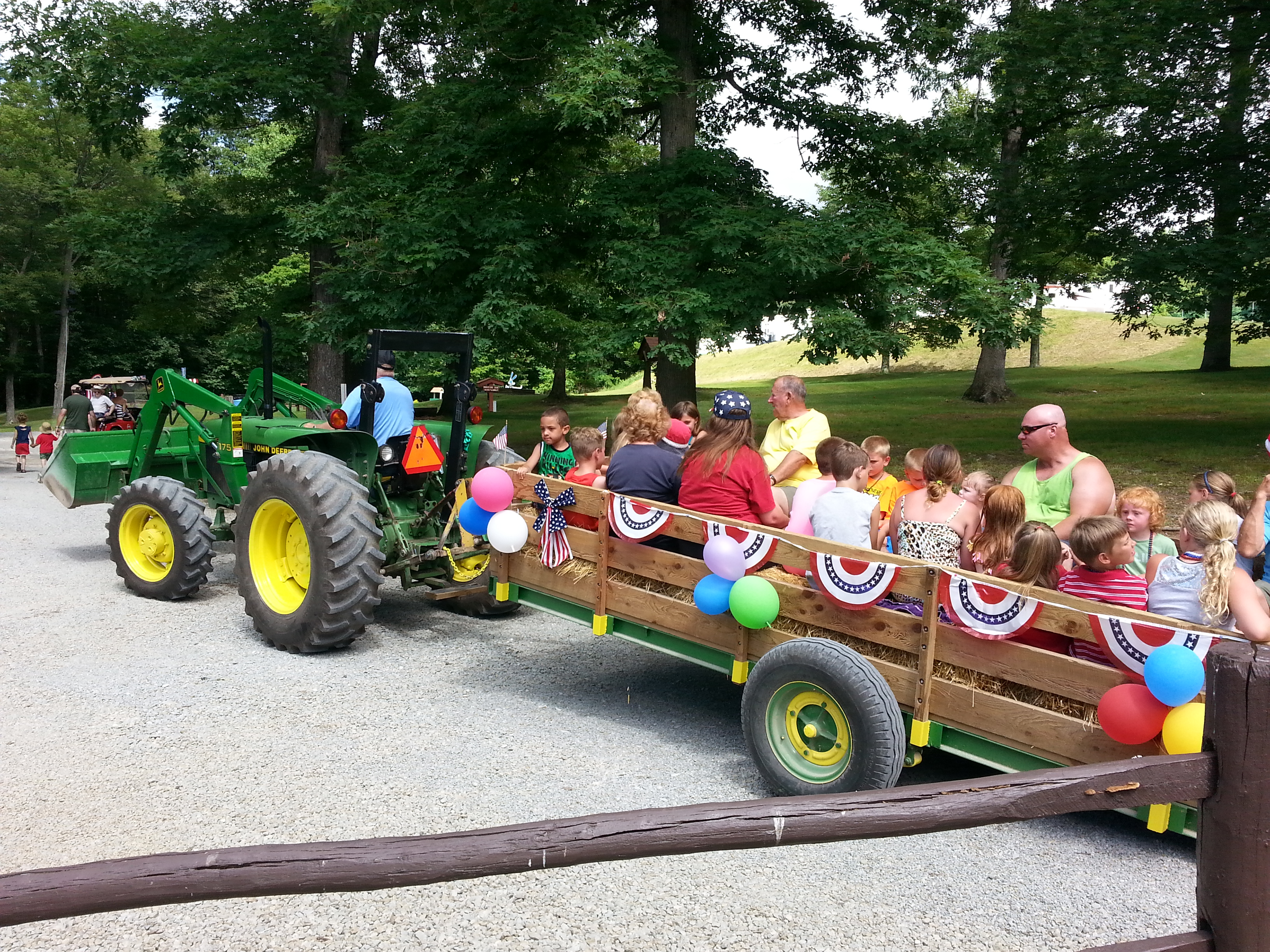
Families ride the haywagon during the 4th of July celebration at Roaring Run Resort in 2013.

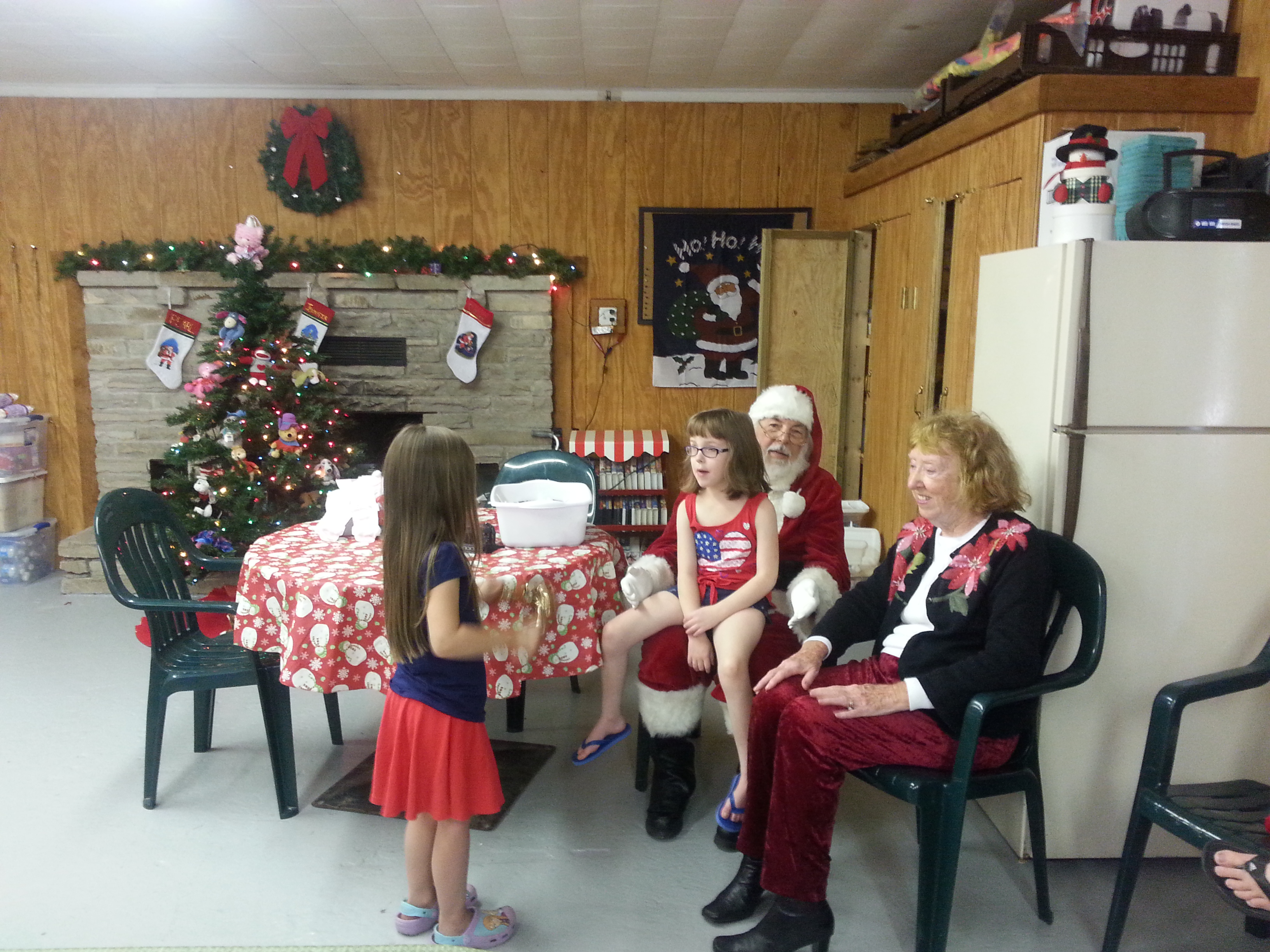
Kids visit Santa during Roaring Run Resort's annual summer "Christmas in July" party.

USA Today featured Roaring Run Resort's rental cabins as a place to stay in the Laurel Highlands region. In addition to the cabins, amenities include basketball, fishing, hiking and nature trails, horseshoes, miniature golf, ping pong, swimming, tennis, volleyball, bocce ball, and shuffleboard.

The resort shares a border with Roaring Run Natural Area, a 3,600-acre tract of land owned by the state of Pennsylvania, as well as a stream called Roaring Run. The stream falls 1,200 feet off Laurel Ridge. The stream is designated as a Wilderness Trout Stream and an Exceptional Value Stream. Roaring Run empties into Indian Creek, adjacent to Roaring Run Resort's property.

== History ==
The earliest recorded history related to the property goes back to President Warren G. Harding's death in 1923. At that time, the local Boy Scouts Troop 5 ran a scouting camp called Camp Confluence in Confluence, Pennsylvania. Frank Werner was the local scoutmaster for Troop 5 and one of the original camp counselors at Camp Aliquippa. When Harding's body was carried by train through Pennsylvania, Werner gathered over 200 Boy Scouts from Camp Confluence and saluted the fallen president as his train passed.

Five years later, in 1927, the McKeesport Boy Scout Council moved the camp to a new location in Champion, Pennsylvania, and renamed it Camp Aliquippa after Queen Alliquippa, a leader of the native American Seneca tribe. Camp Aliquippa later became Roaring Run Resort, but from 1927 to 1974, it was used solely for Boy Scouts.

In the 1940s, the local Kiwanis Club in McKeesport built a lodge at Camp Aliquippa. By 1974, Camp Aliquippa was no longer used for scouting and officially became a membership-based recreational campground park. In 1980, a local real estate developer purchased the property and renamed it Roaring Run Resort. In 2017 businessman Jay Corl purchased the property and has remained the owner as of 2017. As of 2025 it has been sold and is now called Pittsburgh Roaring Run RV Resort and is open to the public.

Mt. Hope Furnace, aka Hopewell Furnace, was a coke-burning furnace located at one time behind the caretaker's house at the original Camp Aliquippa. The furnace was built in 1810. As of 1965, the furnace had been reduced to a pile of stones standing 10 feet high.

In 1989, one local woman wrote a letter to a Pittsburgh Press columnist asking for advice on accepting free gifts in exchange for visiting Roaring Run. In her response, the columnist confirmed that Roaring Run Resort was complaint-free with the Better Business Bureau.

== Data ==
- Credit: Excellent
- BBB Rating: A+
- Primary SIC Code: Sporting and recreational camps (7032)
- Primary NAICS Code: Recreational and Vacation Camps (except Campgrounds) (721214)

== See also ==
- Local council camps of the Boy Scouts of America
- Membership campground
- Recreational vehicle
