= Hidden Valley Resort (Pennsylvania) =

Ski area in Pennsylvania, United States

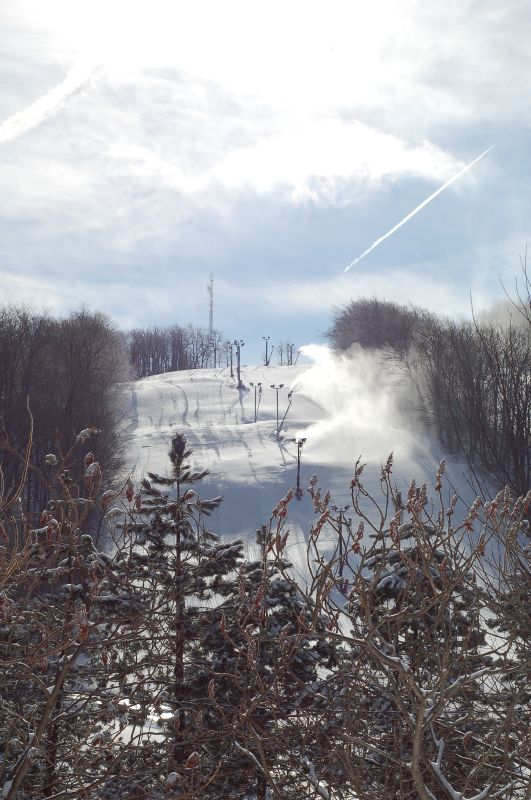
- Slope
- Interactive map of Hidden Valley Resort
- Location: Hidden Valley, Pennsylvania; United States
- Coordinates: 40.058042°N 79.258277°W
- Status: Operating
- Owner: Vail Resorts
- Vertical: 470 ft (140 m)
- Top elevation: 2,875 ft (876 m)
- Base elevation: 2,405 ft (733 m)
- Skiable area: 110 acres (45 ha)
- Trails: 26 trails
- Lift system: 4 chairs
- Terrain parks: 2
- Snowmaking: Yes
- Night skiing: Yes
- Website: hiddenvalleyresort.com

Hidden Valley Resort is a ski resort in the Laurel Highlands, near the village of Hidden Valley, Pennsylvania. In 2021, the resort was purchased by Vail Resorts, along with Seven Springs and Laurel Mountain.
