= Laurel Highlands =

Region in Pennsylvania

Coordinates: 40.241°N 79.239°W

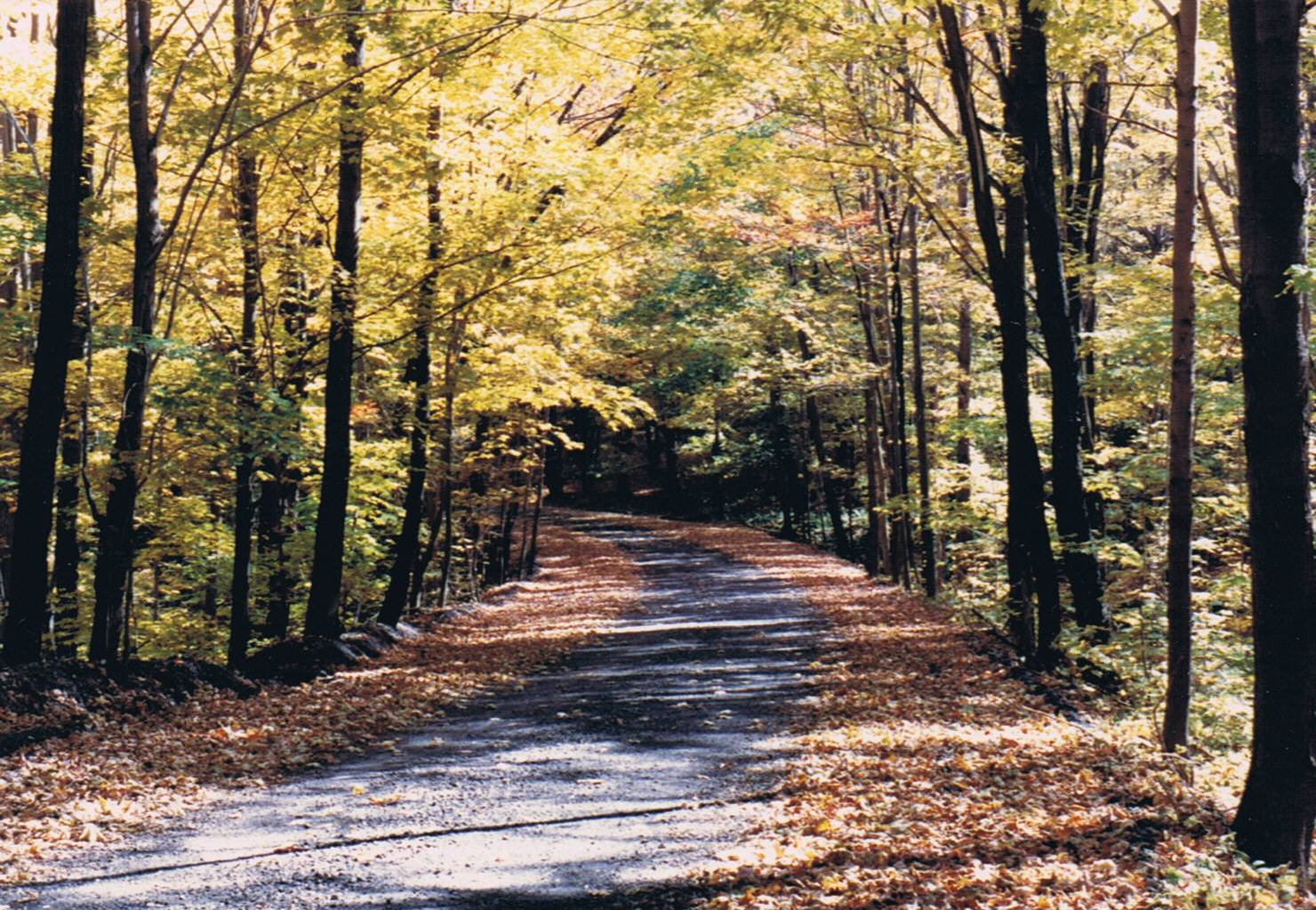
Autumn on a small road in Somerset County

The Laurel Highlands is a region in southwestern Pennsylvania made up of Fayette County, Somerset County, Westmoreland County, and parts of Cambria and Bedford Counties. It has a population of about 600,000 people.

The region is approximately 55 miles southeast of Pittsburgh; the Laurel Highlands center on Laurel Hill and Chestnut Ridge of the Allegheny Mountains. The mountains making up the Laurel Highlands are the highest in Pennsylvania, with Mount Davis in Somerset County the highest point in the state at 3,213 feet (979 m). Because of the elevation, weather in the Laurel Highlands is generally cooler and wetter than in most other parts of the state.

The Laurel Highlands is a popular area for camping, hiking, mountain biking, hunting, whitewater kayaking, trout fishing, wildlife viewing, downhill and cross-country skiing, and golf.

== Amusement parks and resorts ==
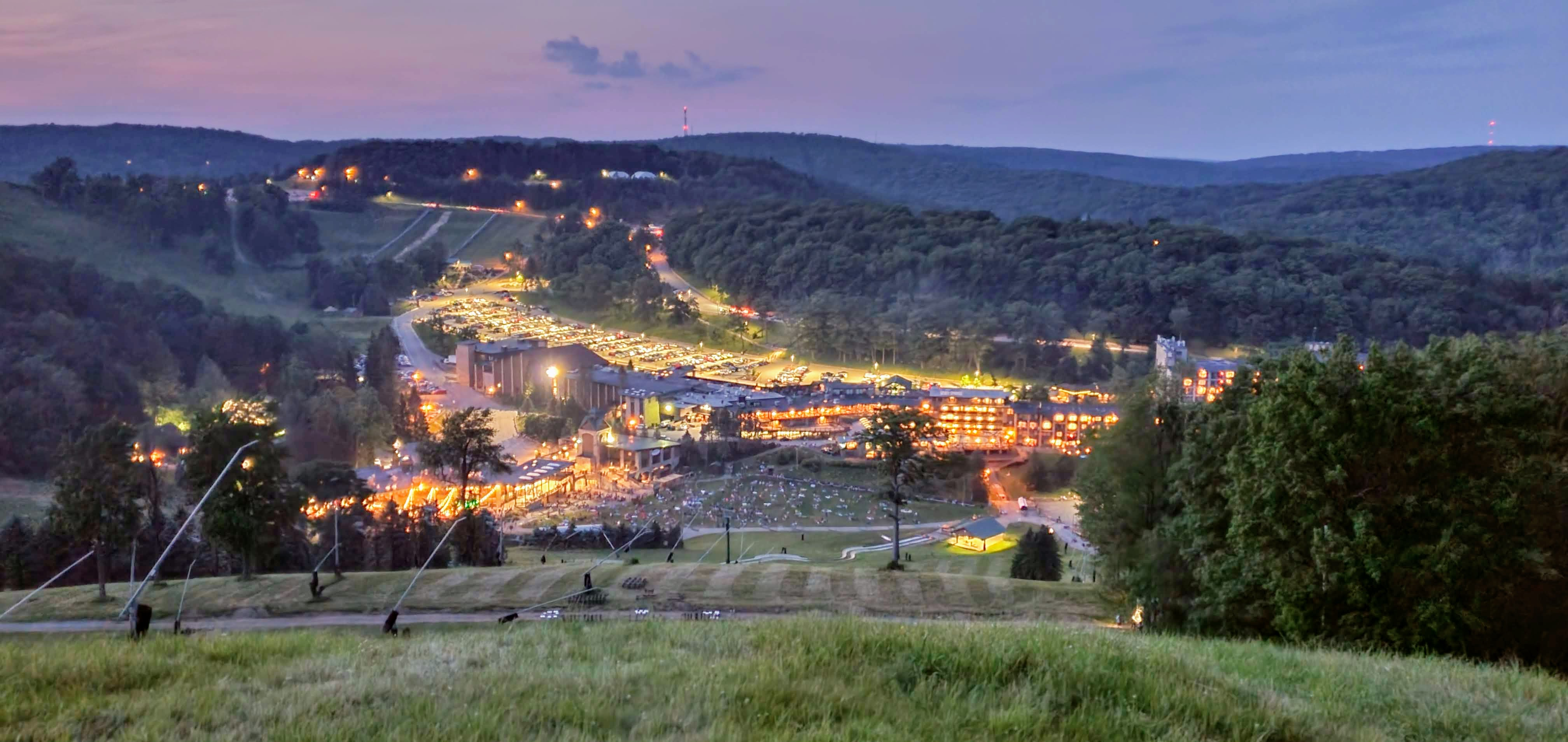
Seven Springs Mountain Resort in Seven Springs during Fourth of July celebrations

- Hidden Valley Resort
- Idlewild Park and Soak Zone
- Nemacolin Woodlands
- Polymath Park
- Seven Springs Mountain Resort
- Laurel Mountain
- Summit Inn Resort

== Architecture ==
- Fallingwater
- Kentuck Knob
- Polymath Park

== National parks and historic sites ==
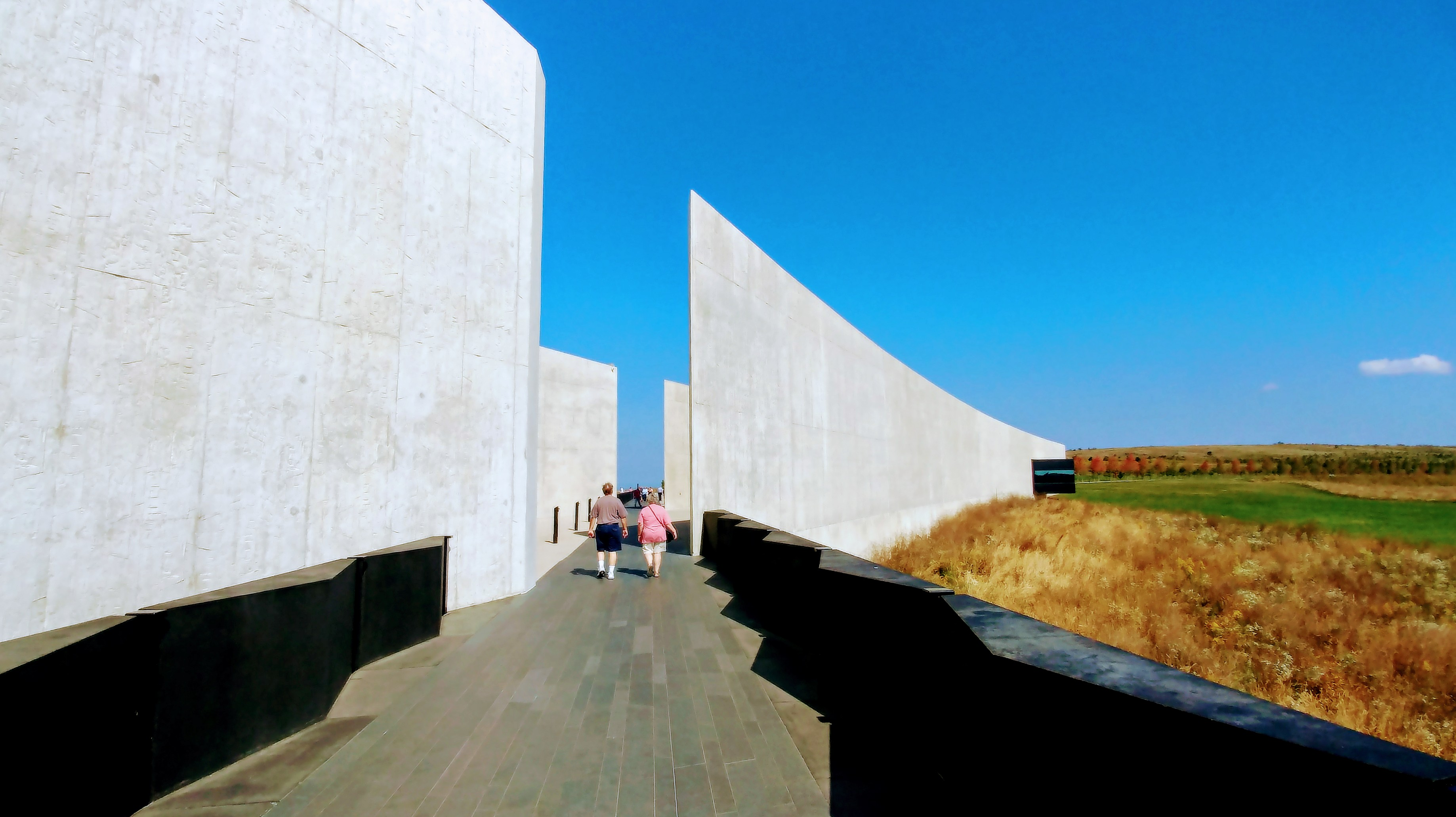
Flight 93 National Memorial in Stonycreek Township

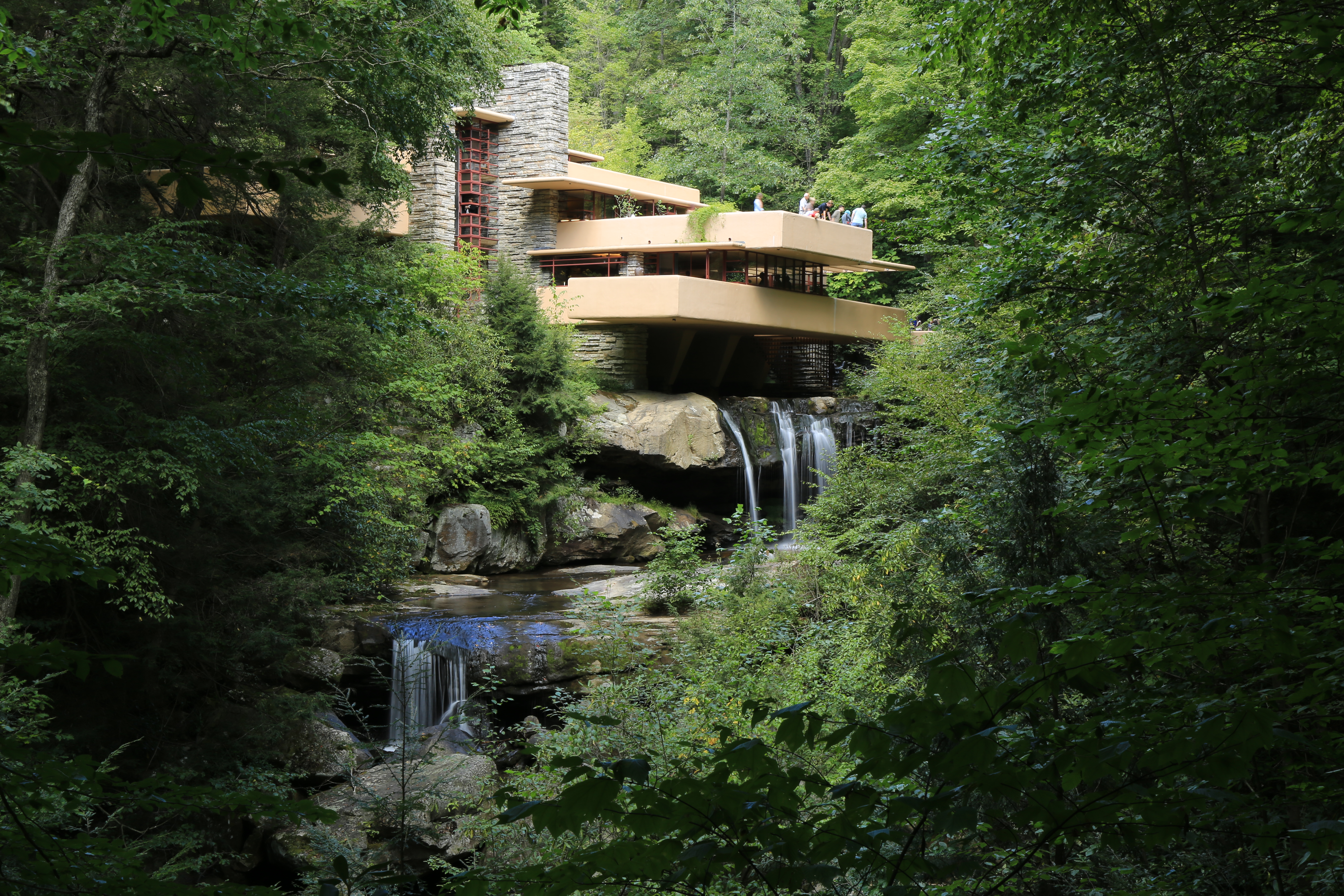
Fallingwater, designed by American architect Frank Lloyd Wright, in Springfield Township

National Parks

- Allegheny Portage Railroad
- Flight 93 National Memorial
- Fort Necessity
- Friendship Hill
- Johnstown Flood National Memorial

UNESCO World Heritage Site

- Fallingwater

Historic Sites

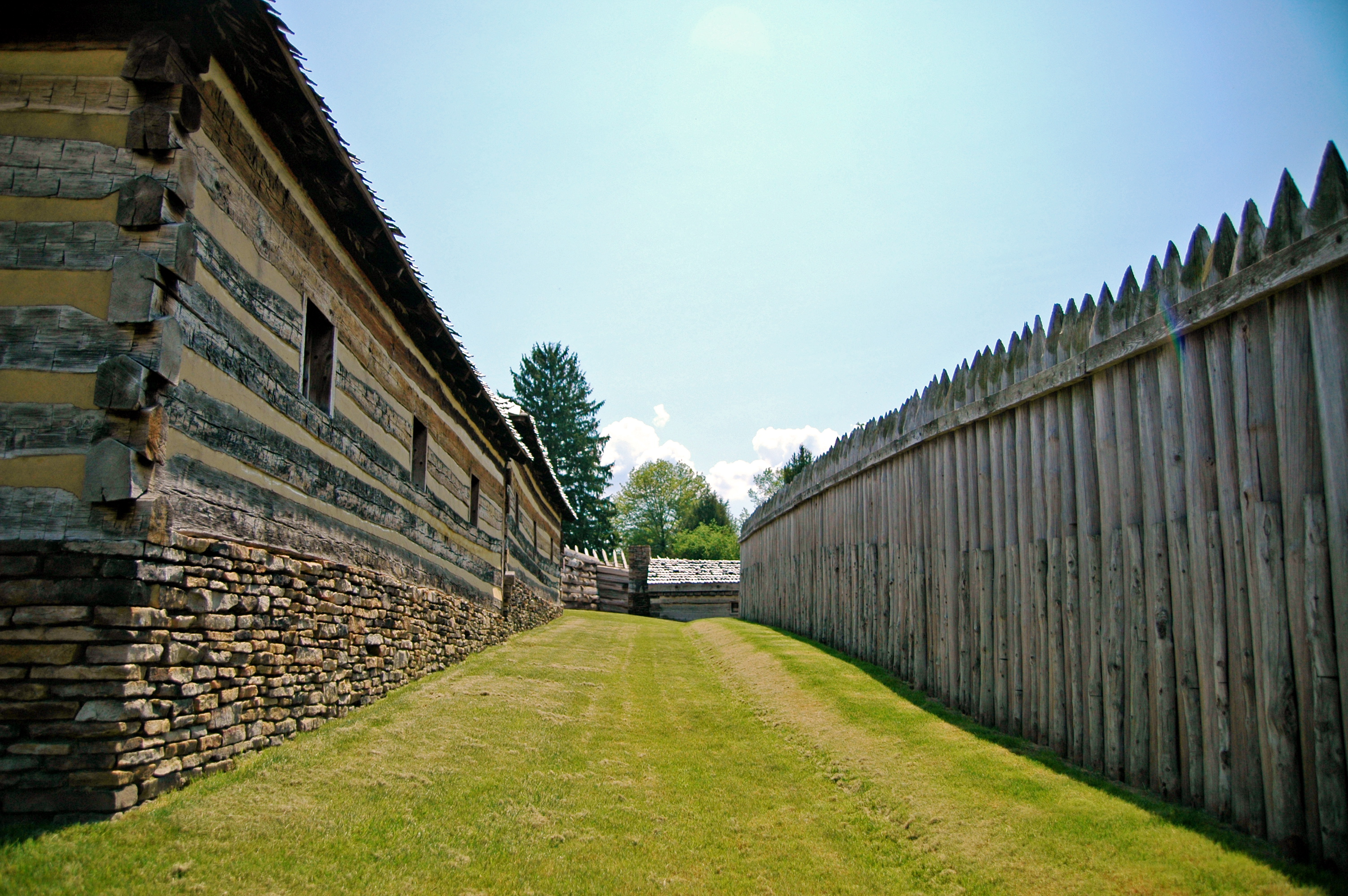
Fort Ligonier in Ligonier

- Bowman's Castle
- Bushy Run Battlefield
- Compass Inn
- Fort Ligonier
- Historic Hanna's Town
- Heritage Discovery Center
- Johnstown Flood Museum
- Johnstown Inclined Plane
- National Road
- Quecreek Mine Rescue
- Route of the Lincoln Highway
- Somerset County Courthouse
- Somerset Historical Center
- Staple Bend Tunnel
- Uptown Somerset Historic District
- Wagner–Ritter House & Garden
- West Overton, Pennsylvania

== Parks and outdoor recreation ==
State Parks and Forests

- Forbes State Forest
- Gallitzin State Forest
- Keystone State Park
- Kooser State Park
- Laurel Caverns State Park
- Laurel Hill State Park
- Laurel Mountain State Park
- Laurel Ridge State Park
- Laurel Summit State Park
- Linn Run State Park
- Mount Davis (part of Forbes State Forest)
- Ohiopyle State Park
- Prince Gallitzin State Park
- Quebec Run Wild Area (part of Forbes State Forest)
- Roaring Run Natural Area (part of Forbes State Forest)
- Youghiogheny River

Trails

- Coal and Coke Trail
- Ghost Town Trail
- Great Allegheny Passage
- Laurel Highlands Hiking Trail (part of Laurel Ridge State Park)
- Jim Mayer Riverwalk
- Westmoreland Heritage Trail
- Five Star Trail

== Downhill ski areas ==
- Hidden Valley Resort
- Laurel Mountain Ski Resort
- Seven Springs Mountain Resort
