= Empire Beauty =

Empire Beauty may refer to a number of things.

- MV Empire Beauty, a ship built in 1943 and scrapped in 1969.
- Empire Beauty Schools, a cosmetology school in the USA founded in 1948
