= Latrell =

Latrell is a given name. Notable people with the name include:

- Latrell Caples (born 2002), American football player
- Latrell McCutchin Sr. (born 2002), American football player
- Latrell Mitchell (born 1997), Australian rugby league footballer
- Latrell Schaumkel (born 1994), rugby league footballer
- Latrell Sprewell (born 1970), American basketball player

== See also ==
- Laurell
