= Laurel Mountain =

Laurel Mountain may refer to:

- Laurel Mountain, in the Forbes State Forest of Pennsylvania
  - Laurel Mountain, Pennsylvania, a borough near the Pennsylvania mountain
  - Laurel Mountain Ski Resort, Pennsylvania
  - Laurel Mountain State Park, Pennsylvania
- Laurel Mountain (West Virginia), West Virginia
- Laurel Mountain (California)
- Laurel Mountain (Oregon)
- Laurel Mountain Elementary School, Austin, Texas
- A former name of the Cumberland Mountains

== See also ==
- Mountain laurel (disambiguation), several flowering plants
