= Laureles =

Laureles may refer to:

- Laureles, Ñeembucú, a town in Paraguay
- Laureles, Texas, a census-designated place in Cameron County
- Laureles F.C., a football club in Uruguay
- Laureles (Mexibús), a BRT station in Ecatepec, Mexico

== See also ==
- Laurel (disambiguation)
