= Hidden Valley, Pennsylvania =

Unincorporated community in Pennsylvania, U.S.

Coordinates: 40°6′24″N 75°22′41″W

Hidden Valley is an unincorporated community that is located in Jefferson Township, Somerset County, Pennsylvania, United States.

== History and demographics ==
The Hidden Valley Foundation is a large homeowner association (HOA) which comprises Hidden Valley and the 1185 homes within its boundaries. The community is governed by an elected board of directors and is managed by a professional staff. The Hidden Valley Foundation provides the community with services including private roads, grounds maintenance, security, social and recreational programs, amenities (pools, tennis courts, pickleball courts, play grounds, parks, trails, the Mountain Metric Bike Race, and others), architectural control and enforcement of the conditions, covenants, and restrictions (CCRs) to maintain the HOA.

Formally, Hidden Valley Foundation and the Hidden Valley Resort were the combined operation of a single entity, Hidden Valley Resorts, a management subsidiary of Kettler Brothers of Maryland. The developer's control was sunsetted per legal declaration, and as of January 1, 2020, and the community of Hidden Valley through the Hidden Valley Foundation became a self-governing community.

The Hidden Valley Resort, a ski resort now owned by Vail Resorts, Inc., is located within the community, but is not part of the Hidden Valley Foundation (the HOA) along the southern side of Pennsylvania Route 31.

The Pennsylvania Turnpike (Interstates 70/76) is within a few miles of the community, which lies in the Laurel Highlands.

== Climate ==
Climate data for Hidden Valley, Pennsylvania, 1991–2020 normals: 2876ft (877m)
Month	Jan	Feb	Mar	Apr	May	Jun	Jul	Aug	Sep	Oct	Nov	Dec	Year
Record high °F (°C)	64 (18)	72 (22)	73 (23)	81 (27)	85 (29)	86 (30)	89 (32)	86 (30)	87 (31)	82 (28)	73 (23)	63 (17)	89 (32)
Mean daily maximum °F (°C)	31.8 (−0.1)	34.8 (1.6)	43.7 (6.5)	57.1 (13.9)	66.5 (19.2)	72.2 (22.3)	76.9 (24.9)	75.0 (23.9)	70.1 (21.2)	58.6 (14.8)	46.5 (8.1)	36.8 (2.7)	55.8 (13.2)
Daily mean °F (°C)	24.3 (−4.3)	26.4 (−3.1)	34.2 (1.2)	45.6 (7.6)	56.9 (13.8)	64.0 (17.8)	69.1 (20.6)	67.0 (19.4)	61.1 (16.2)	49.3 (9.6)	38.4 (3.6)	29.7 (−1.3)	47.2 (8.4)
Mean daily minimum °F (°C)	16.7 (−8.5)	17.9 (−7.8)	24.6 (−4.1)	34.0 (1.1)	47.2 (8.4)	55.8 (13.2)	61.2 (16.2)	58.9 (14.9)	52.1 (11.2)	40.0 (4.4)	30.2 (−1.0)	22.6 (−5.2)	38.4 (3.6)
Record low °F (°C)	−14 (−26)	−14 (−26)	−3 (−19)	12 (−11)	20 (−7)	40 (4)	50 (10)	48 (9)	37 (3)	26 (−3)	8 (−13)	−6 (−21)	−14 (−26)
Average precipitation inches (mm)	4.48 (114)	4.86 (123)	4.48 (114)	5.54 (141)	5.37 (136)	4.73 (120)	4.15 (105)	4.72 (120)	4.31 (109)	4.10 (104)	4.18 (106)	5.01 (127)	55.93 (1,419)
Average snowfall inches (cm)	25.5 (65)	25.0 (64)	17.1 (43)	7.0 (18)	0.2 (0.51)	0.0 (0.0)	0.0 (0.0)	0.0 (0.0)	0.0 (0.0)	0.3 (0.76)	5.1 (13)	22.0 (56)	102.2 (260.27)
Source 1: NOAA
Source 2: XMACIS (snowfall, temp records & monthly max/mins)
