= Mountain laurel =

Mountain Laurel or mountain laurel may refer to:

- Calia secundiflora, Texas mountain laurel
- Cryptocarya nova-anglica from eastern Australia
- Kalmia latifolia, from eastern North America
- Umbellularia californica, from north-western North America

== See also ==
- Laurel Mountain (disambiguation)
- Mount Laurel, New Jersey
