= Laurel Fork =

Laurel Fork may refer to:

== Places ==
=== United States ===
- Laurel Fork (Cheat River), a river in West Virginia
- Laurel Fork (Clear Fork Guyandotte River), a river in West Virginia
- Laurel Fork (North Fork South Branch Potomac River), a stream in Virginia and West Virginia
- Laurel Fork (conservation area), a wildland in western Virginia
- Laurel Fork Railway in Tennessee
- Laurel Fork, Tennessee
- Laurel Fork, Virginia
- Laurel Fork, West Virginia
