= Laurell =

Laurell may refer to:

- Laurell K. Hamilton (born 1963), American fantasy and romance writer
- Anna Laurell Nash (born 1980), Swedish boxer
- Valtteri Laurell Pöyhönen (born 1978), Finnish jazz guitarist, pianist, composer, bandleader, and producer
- Jacinda Kate Laurell Ardern (born 1980), New Zealand former politician and Prime Minister
- Carl-Bertil Laurell (1919-2001), Swedish medical doctor and researcher
- Kay Laurell (born Ruth Leslie) (1890-1927), American stage- and silent film actress and model
- Laurell (singer) (born 1979), Canadian singer and songwriter

== See also ==
- Laurel (disambiguation)
