= USS Laurel =

Tugboat of the United States Navy

History

United States
- Name: Erebus
- Operator: United States Army
- Launched: 1862
- Completed: 1862
- Acquired: 1862
- Fate: Transferred to U.S. Navy 30 August 1862

History

United States
- Name: USS Laurel
- Operator: United States Navy
- Acquired: 30 August 1862
- Commissioned: 19 October 1862
- Decommissioned: 12 August 1865
- Fate: Sold 17 August 1865

General characteristics
- Type: Tug
- Tonnage: 50 tons
- Length: 60 ft (18 m)
- Beam: 14 ft (4.3 m)
- Draft: 6 ft (1.8 m)
- Propulsion: Screw steamer
- Speed: 5 knots
- Armament: none

USS Laurel was a screw tug in commission in the United States Navy from 1862 to 1865. She saw service in the Union Navy during the American Civil War. Prior to her U.S. Navy service, she served as the United States Army tug Erebus.

== Construction and U.S. Army service ==
The tug was built for the U.S. Army in 1862 at St. Louis, Missouri, as Erebus for Union Army service. She entered service early in 1862. On 14 April 1862, she accidentally burned to the waterline on the Mississippi River and sank within a half-mile (0.8 km) of Craighead Point, 3,800 yards (3,475 meters) above Fort Pillow, Tennessee. Her crew was rescued, and she was refloated, repaired, and returned to service.

== U.S. Navy service ==
Erebus was transferred from the U.S. Army to the U.S. Navy on 30 August or 30 September 1862 (sources disagree) and renamed USS Laurel on 19 October 1862. She operated on the Mississippi River for the remainder of the American Civil War, supporting operations of both the Union Army and U.S. Navy.

After the war ended in 1865, Laurel assisted in the demobilization of the Mississippi Squadron before decommissioning at Mound City, Illinois, on 12 August 1865. She was sold at auction there to Sol. A. Silver on 17 August 1865. Documented as for commercial service as Laurel on 2 January 1867, she remained in service until abandoned in 1903.
