= Laurel High School =

Laurel High School may refer to:

- Laurel High School in Alexander City, Alabama, a high school for African Americans that merged with Benjamin Russell High School in 1971
- Laurel High School, in Los Alamitos, California
- Laurel High School (Delaware)
- Laurel High School (Maryland)
- Laurel High School (Mississippi)
- Laurel High School (Montana)
- Laurel High School (Wisconsin)
- Laurel High School (Knoxville, Tennessee), a high school in Knox County, Tennessee

== See also ==
- North Laurel High School and South Laurel High School, Laurel County Public Schools, Kentucky
