= Laurel Fork, West Virginia =

- Unincorporated community
- Location within West Virginia Location within the United States
- Coordinates: 38°41′21″N 80°40′29″W
- Country: United States
- State: West Virginia
- County: Braxton
- Elevation: 991 ft (302 m)
- Time zone: UTC-5 (Eastern (EST))
  - Summer (DST): UTC-4 (EDT)
- Area codes: 304 & 681
- GNIS feature ID: 1554917

Laurel Fork is an unincorporated community in Braxton County, West Virginia, United States.
