= Laurel, Barbour County, West Virginia =

Laurel
- Unincorporated community
- Location within the state of West Virginia Laurel (the United States)
- Coordinates: 38°57′38″N 79°59′19″W
- Country: United States
- State: West Virginia
- County: Barbour
- Elevation: 1,752 ft (534 m)
- Time zone: UTC-5 (Eastern (EST))
  - Summer (DST): UTC-4 (EDT)
- GNIS ID: 1697096

Laurel was an unincorporated community in Barbour County, West Virginia, United States.
