= Laurel station =

Laurel station may refer to:

== Places ==
- Laurel Station, a community in the township of Amaranth, Ontario

=== Railway Stations ===
- Laurel station (Mississippi), an Amtrak station in Laurel, Mississippi
- Laurel station (MARC), a MARC station in Laurel, Maryland
- Laurel station (LIRR), a former Long Island Rail Road station in Laurel, New York
- Laurel station (West Virginia), a former Chesapeake and Ohio Railway station in West Virginia

== See also ==
- Laurel Racetrack station
- Laurel House station
- Laurel Hill station
