= Laurel, Tennessee =

Unincorporated community in Tennessee, US

Coordinates: 35°46′37″N 83°24′21″W

Laurel is an unincorporated community, in Sevier County, Tennessee, on State Route 416, north of U.S. Route 321, in the Great Smoky Mountains.
