= Laurel Mountain Ski Resort =

Ski area in Pennsylvania, United States

Laurel Mountain
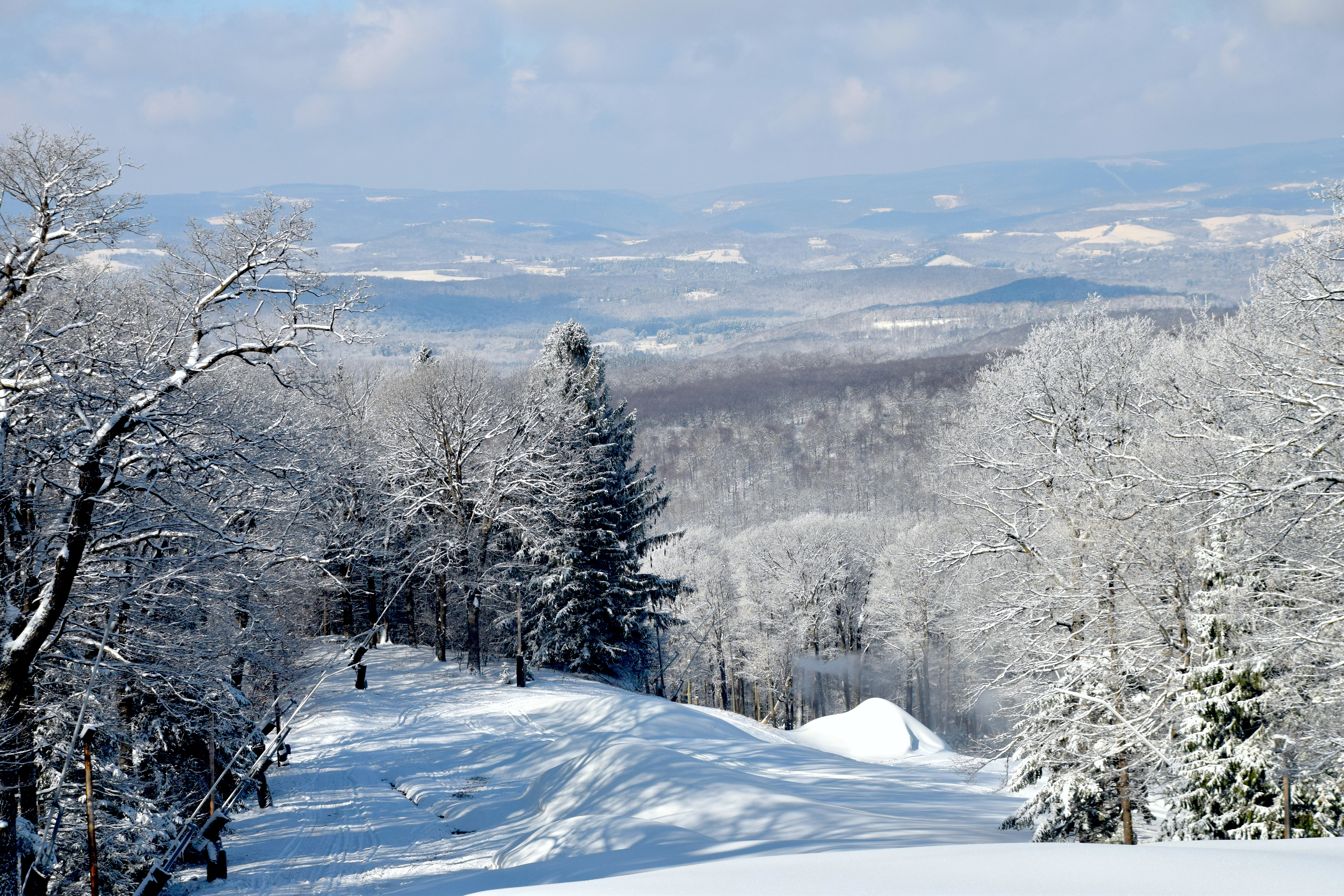
- Laurel Mountain views
- Interactive map of Laurel Mountain
- Location: Ligonier Township, Westmoreland County, Pennsylvania, United States
- Nearest city: Ligonier, Pennsylvania
- Owner: Commonwealth of Pennsylvania (operated by Vail Resorts)
- Vertical: 761 feet (232 m)
- Top elevation: 2,766 feet (843 m)
- Base elevation: 2,005 feet (611 m)
- Skiable area: 70 acres (280,000 m^{2})
- Trails: 20 total (10 Beginner, 7 Intermediate, 3 Advanced)
- Lift system: 1 Quad Chairlift, 1 Surface Lift
- Website: http://www.laurelmountainski.com/

Laurel Mountain Ski Resort is a ski resort located in Westmoreland County, Pennsylvania, United States within Laurel Mountain State Park. It is owned by the Commonwealth of Pennsylvania but operated under lease by Vail Resorts. The resort has 20 trails and 2 lifts with a 761 feet (232 m) vertical drop.

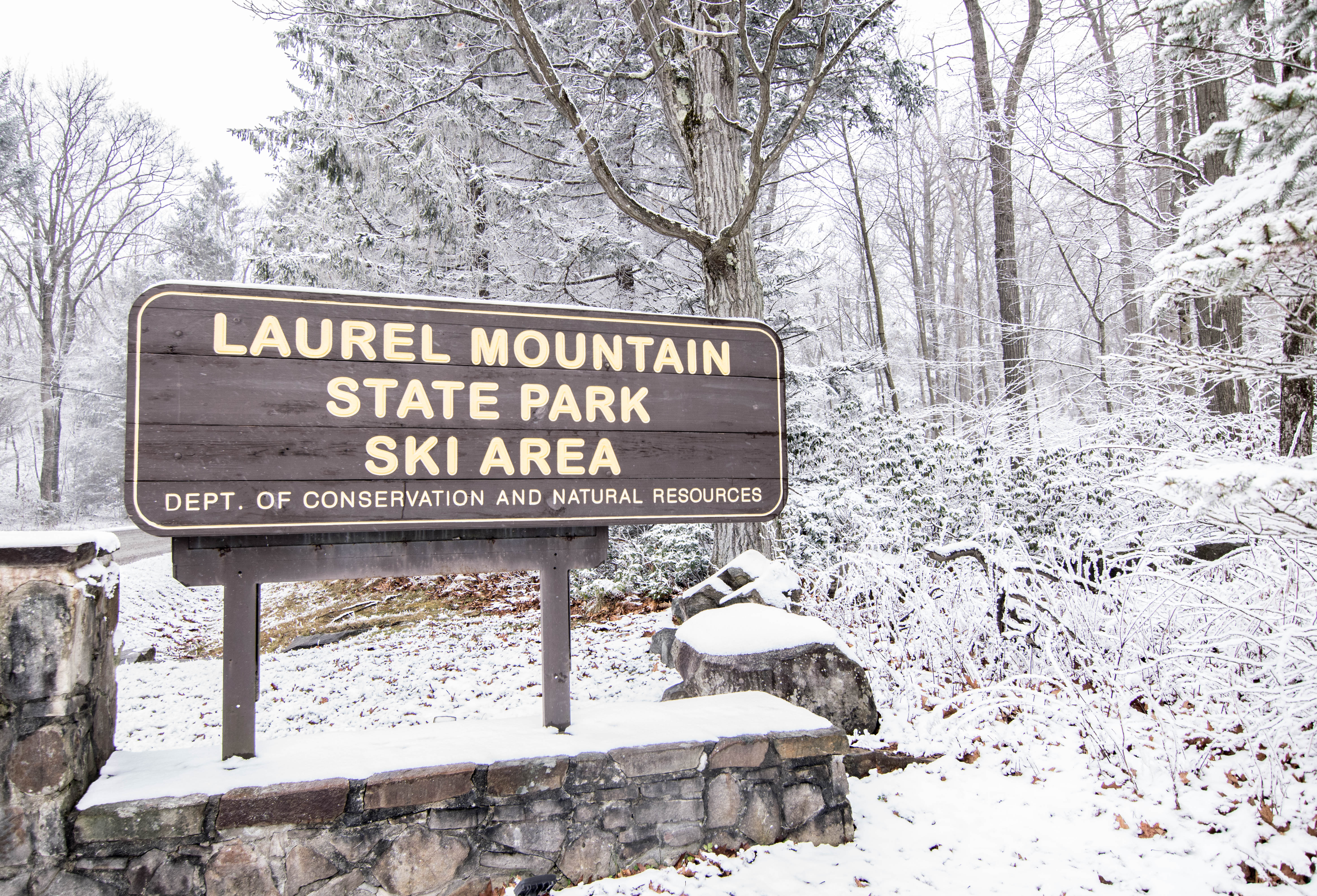
Laurel Mountain ski area sign after fresh snow

== History ==
Laurel Mountain’s distinct character is the result of a rich history. The slopes were originally designed by European skiing legend Johann "Hannes" Schneider, a renowned Austrian ski guide and inventor of the Arlberg Method, the basis of modern alpine ski technique. The resort opened in 1940, just before the U.S. entered World War II, and some of the original structures, including the storied Midway Cabin, still stand on the property. Once an exclusive club for the most prestigious residents of Pennsylvania, Laurel Mountain was gifted to the commonwealth in 1964.

The resort closed for more than a decade, starting in 2005. In 2008, Bob Nutting, owner of Seven Springs and Hidden Valley, signed a lease with the state to operate the resort. The Pennsylvania DCNR and Seven Springs Mountain Resort partnered to invest $6.5 million into a multi-year renovation project to upgrade the facility with a modern SkyTrac fixed-grip quad chairlift, renovated lodge, and improved slopes. The snowmaking system was overhauled with the addition of 52 new guns and the water storage capacity nearly doubled to 26 million gallons. Laurel Mountain reopened for the 2016-2017 season.

In December 2021, Vail Resorts took over the lease for the resort from Seven Springs Mountain Resort, Inc., with the Commonwealth of Pennsylvania retaining ownership.

== Facilities ==
The Midway Cabin. The original lodge at Laurel Mountain built in 1940 is located approximately halfway down the Broadway slope. Starting in 1954 the Pittsburgh Ski Club used the cabin as their mountain headquarters. The lodge had a dormitory that was available to members for an affordable $1.65/night. The PSC used the lodge until approximately 1954 when the region's focus on skiing shifted towards Seven Springs and Hidden Valley. The cabin is still standing today.

Modern Lodge. A more modern two-story lodge of approximately 14,500 square feet was built in 1999. The lodge offers services including retail, rental and tickets. There is historic Pennsylvania ski memorabilia throughout. The lodge has two restaurants, the Wildcat Lounge and the Laurel House cafe.

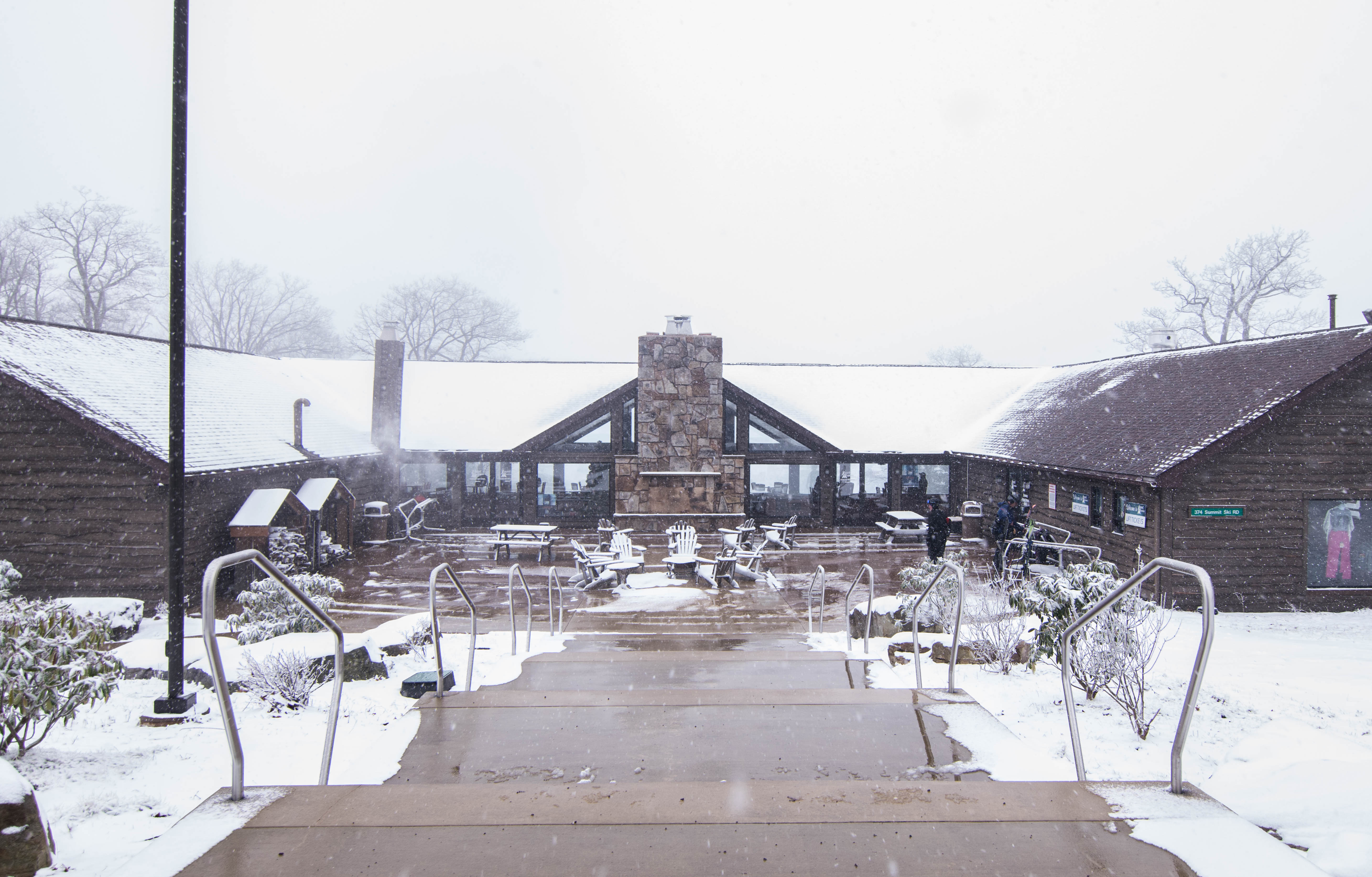
The lodge at Laurel Mountain State Park ski area, PA.

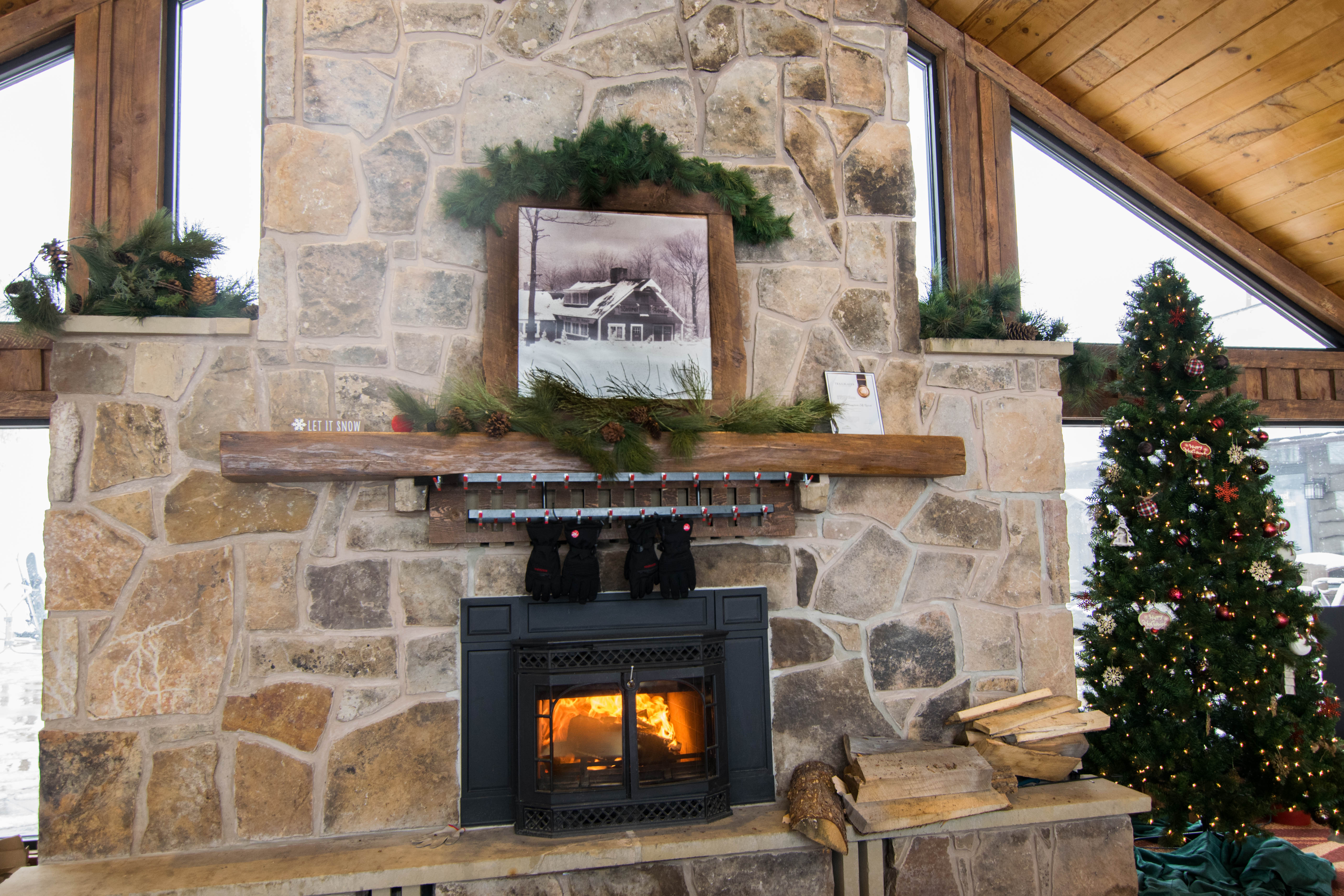
The hearth inside Laurel Mountain State Park's lodge.

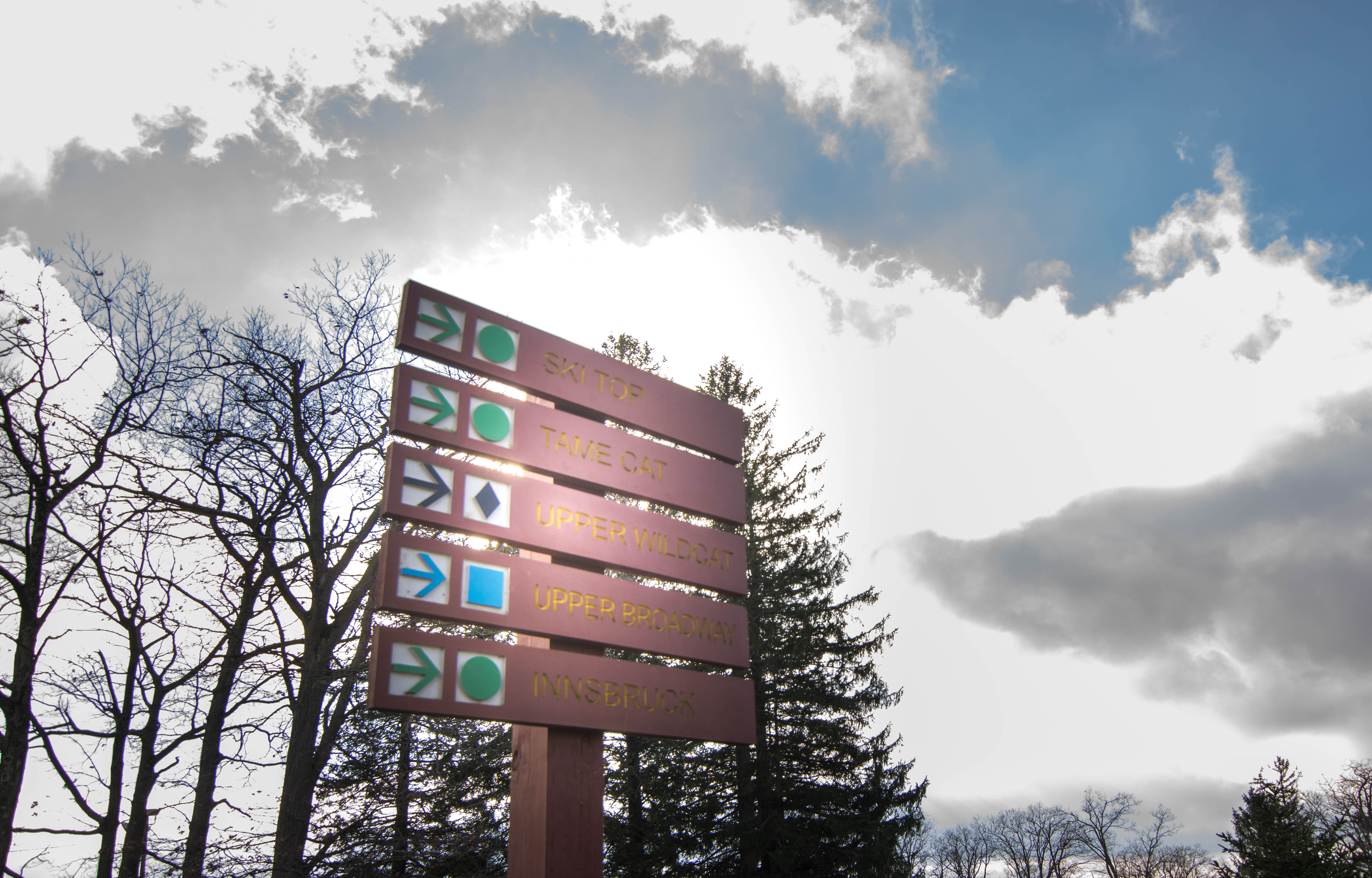
Trail sign at Laurel Mountain State Park Ski Area, PA

== Ski lifts ==
Laurel Mountain has a modern SkyTrac fixed-grip quad chairlift, constructed in 2016, and one surface lift.

== Terrain ==
The resort has 20 trails over 70 acres (28 ha) of terrain with a 761 feet (232 m) vertical drop.

== Climate ==
According to the Köppen Climate Classification system, Laurel Mountain has a warm-summer humid continental climate, abbreviated "Dfb" on climate maps. The hottest temperature recorded at Laurel Summit was 90 °F (32.2 °C) on July 7, 2020, while the coldest temperature recorded was −18 °F (−27.8 °C) on January 7–8, 2014.

Climate data for Laurel Summit, Pennsylvania, 1991–2020 normals, extremes 1999–present
Month	Jan	Feb	Mar	Apr	May	Jun	Jul	Aug	Sep	Oct	Nov	Dec	Year
Record high °F (°C)	63 (17)	73 (23)	75 (24)	83 (28)	85 (29)	87 (31)	90 (32)	87 (31)	89 (32)	83 (28)	75 (24)	68 (20)	90 (32)
Mean maximum °F (°C)	55.3 (12.9)	53.9 (12.2)	65.4 (18.6)	76.3 (24.6)	81.9 (27.7)	82.1 (27.8)	83.6 (28.7)	81.7 (27.6)	81.6 (27.6)	74.7 (23.7)	67.0 (19.4)	57.7 (14.3)	85.2 (29.6)
Mean daily maximum °F (°C)	30.9 (−0.6)	33.9 (1.1)	42.7 (5.9)	56.1 (13.4)	64.5 (18.1)	71.2 (21.8)	74.5 (23.6)	73.8 (23.2)	68.0 (20.0)	57.7 (14.3)	45.7 (7.6)	35.2 (1.8)	54.5 (12.5)
Daily mean °F (°C)	22.6 (−5.2)	24.8 (−4.0)	32.7 (0.4)	45.1 (7.3)	54.7 (12.6)	62.3 (16.8)	66.4 (19.1)	65.3 (18.5)	59.4 (15.2)	48.4 (9.1)	37.4 (3.0)	27.7 (−2.4)	45.6 (7.5)
Mean daily minimum °F (°C)	14.4 (−9.8)	15.7 (−9.1)	22.7 (−5.2)	34.1 (1.2)	44.9 (7.2)	53.4 (11.9)	58.2 (14.6)	56.8 (13.8)	50.7 (10.4)	39.2 (4.0)	29.2 (−1.6)	20.1 (−6.6)	36.6 (2.6)
Mean minimum °F (°C)	−4.5 (−20.3)	−3.2 (−19.6)	5.7 (−14.6)	19.8 (−6.8)	30.4 (−0.9)	41.9 (5.5)	49.0 (9.4)	48.7 (9.3)	40.7 (4.8)	27.5 (−2.5)	15.6 (−9.1)	5.9 (−14.5)	−7.0 (−21.7)
Record low °F (°C)	−18 (−28)	−15 (−26)	−8 (−22)	10 (−12)	19 (−7)	35 (2)	39 (4)	44 (7)	34 (1)	23 (−5)	3 (−16)	−12 (−24)	−18 (−28)
Average precipitation inches (mm)	4.41 (112)	3.50 (89)	4.72 (120)	4.87 (124)	5.47 (139)	5.94 (151)	5.14 (131)	4.78 (121)	4.81 (122)	4.23 (107)	4.31 (109)	4.43 (113)	56.61 (1,438)
Average snowfall inches (cm)	38.6 (98)	37.5 (95)	21.5 (55)	6.9 (18)	0.3 (0.76)	0.0 (0.0)	0.0 (0.0)	0.0 (0.0)	0.0 (0.0)	2.4 (6.1)	8.1 (21)	26.9 (68)	142.2 (361.86)
Average extreme snow depth inches (cm)	14.3 (36)	15.0 (38)	12.0 (30)	4.0 (10)	0.2 (0.51)	0.0 (0.0)	0.0 (0.0)	0.0 (0.0)	0.0 (0.0)	2.1 (5.3)	3.4 (8.6)	7.3 (19)	19.1 (49)
Average precipitation days (≥ 0.01 in)	19.0	14.9	14.7	14.5	15.0	13.8	12.8	12.0	10.8	12.8	12.9	16.4	169.6
Average snowy days (≥ 0.1 in)	16.0	13.0	9.2	3.6	0.4	0.0	0.0	0.0	0.0	1.1	5.1	11.4	59.8
Source 1: NOAA
Source 2: National Weather Service (mean maxima/minima, snow depth 2006–2020)

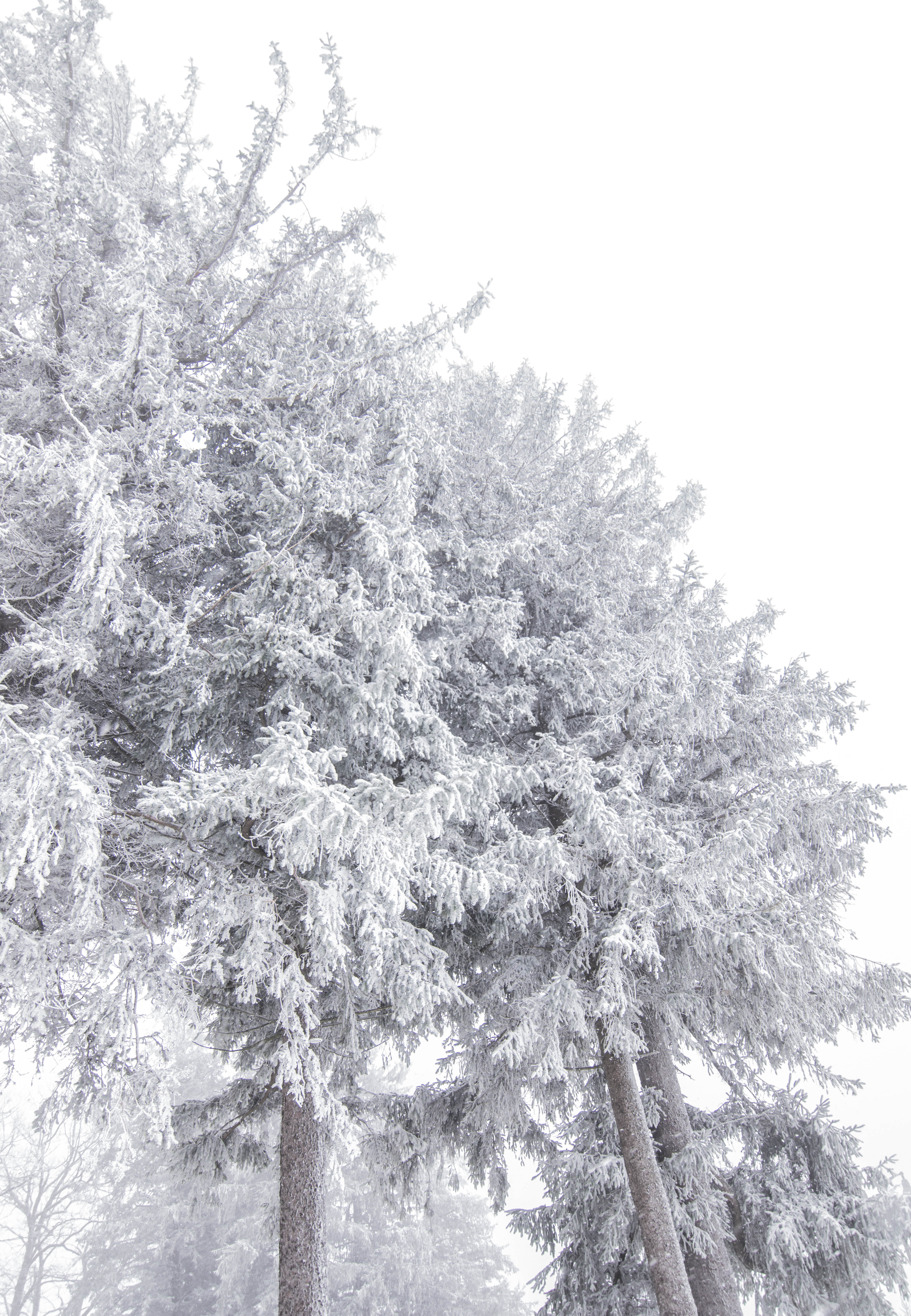
Trees covered in snow at Laurel Mountain state park ski area.
