= MV Polycrown =

Cargo ship built in 1943

History
- Name: Empire Beauty (1943-46); Polycrown (1946-62); Ioannis Aspiotis (1962-68); Laurel (1968-69)
- Owner: Ministry of War Transport (1943-46); Einar Rasmussen (1946-62); Lamda Shipping Enterprises Corporation (1962-68); Laurel Shipping Co Ltd (1968)
- Operator: Stephens, Sutton Ltd (1943-46); Kristiansands Tankrederi A/S (1946-62); Lamda Shipping Enterprises Corporation (1962-68); Laurel Shipping Co Ltd (1968)
- Port of registry: (United Kingdom) Sunderland (1943-46); (Norway) Kristiansand (1946-62); (Lebanon) Beirut (1962-68); (Cyprus) Famagusta (1968)
- Builder: William Doxford & Sons, Sunderland
- Yard number: 703
- Launched: 8 April 1943
- Completed: July 1943
- Identification: UK Official Number 169119 (1943-46); Code Letters BFJG (1943-46); Code Letters LLKP (1946-62)
- Fate: Scrapped 1969

General characteristics
- Type: Cargo ship
- Tonnage: 7,297 GRT; 4,936 NRT; 10,270 DWT
- Length: 428 ft 8 in (130.66 m)
- Beam: 56 ft 5 in (17.20 m)
- Depth: 35 ft 5 in (10.80 m)
- Propulsion: One SCSA oil engine, 516 hp (385 kW)
- Speed: 10 knots (19 km/h)
- Armament: 4" gun, 6 machine guns, net defence (Empire Beauty)

Polycrown was a 7,297 GRT cargo ship which was built by William Doxford & Sons, Sunderland in 1943 as Empire Beauty. Postwar she was sold into merchant service as Polycrown and saw further service as Ioannis Aspiotis and Laurel before she was scrapped in 1969.

== Description ==
Empire Beauty was built by William Doxford & Sons, Sunderland. She was yard number 703. Empire Beauty was launched on 8 April 1943 and completed in July that year. She had a GRT of 7,297, NRT of 4,936 and DWT of 10,270.

== Career ==
Empire Beauty was built for the Ministry of War Transport (MoWT) and placed under the management of Stephens, Sutton Ltd. Empire Beauty was a member of a number of convoys during the Second World War.

SL 167

Convoy SL 167 sailed from Freetown, Sierra Leone on 9 August 1944 and arrived at Liverpool on 29 October 1944. Empire Beauty was carrying a cargo of Linseed.

KMS 65

Convoy KMS 65 sailed from Liverpool on 4 October 1944 and arrived at Gibraltar on 11 October 1944. Empire Beauty was carrying a cargo of stores and was bound for Port Said, Egypt, Basra, Iraq and Bandar Mashur, Iran.

In June 1946, Empire Beauty was sold to Einar Rasmussen, Kristiansand, Norway and renamed Polycrown. She was placed under the management of Kristiansands Tankrederi A/S. In 1962, Polycrown was sold to Lamda Shipping Enterprises Corporation, Beirut, Lebanon and renamed Ioannis Aspiotis. In 1968, Ioannis Aspiotis was sold to Laurel Shipping Co Ltd, Famagusta, Cyprus and renamed Laurel. Later that year she was sold to shipbreakers at Kaohsiung, Taiwan, where she arrived for scrapping on 23 December 1968.

== Official Numbers and Code Letters ==
Official numbers were a forerunner to IMO Numbers. Empire Beauty had the UK Official Number 169119 and used the Code Letters BFJG. Polycrown used the Code Letters LLKP.

== Propulsion ==
The ship was propelled by a 3-cylinder SCSA oil engine which had cylinders of 23 5/8 in (60 cm) diameter by 91 5/16 in (232 cm) stroke. It was built by William Doxford & Sons. She was capable of 11.5 knots (21.3 km/h).
