= Laurel Mountain State Park =

State park in Pennsylvania, United States

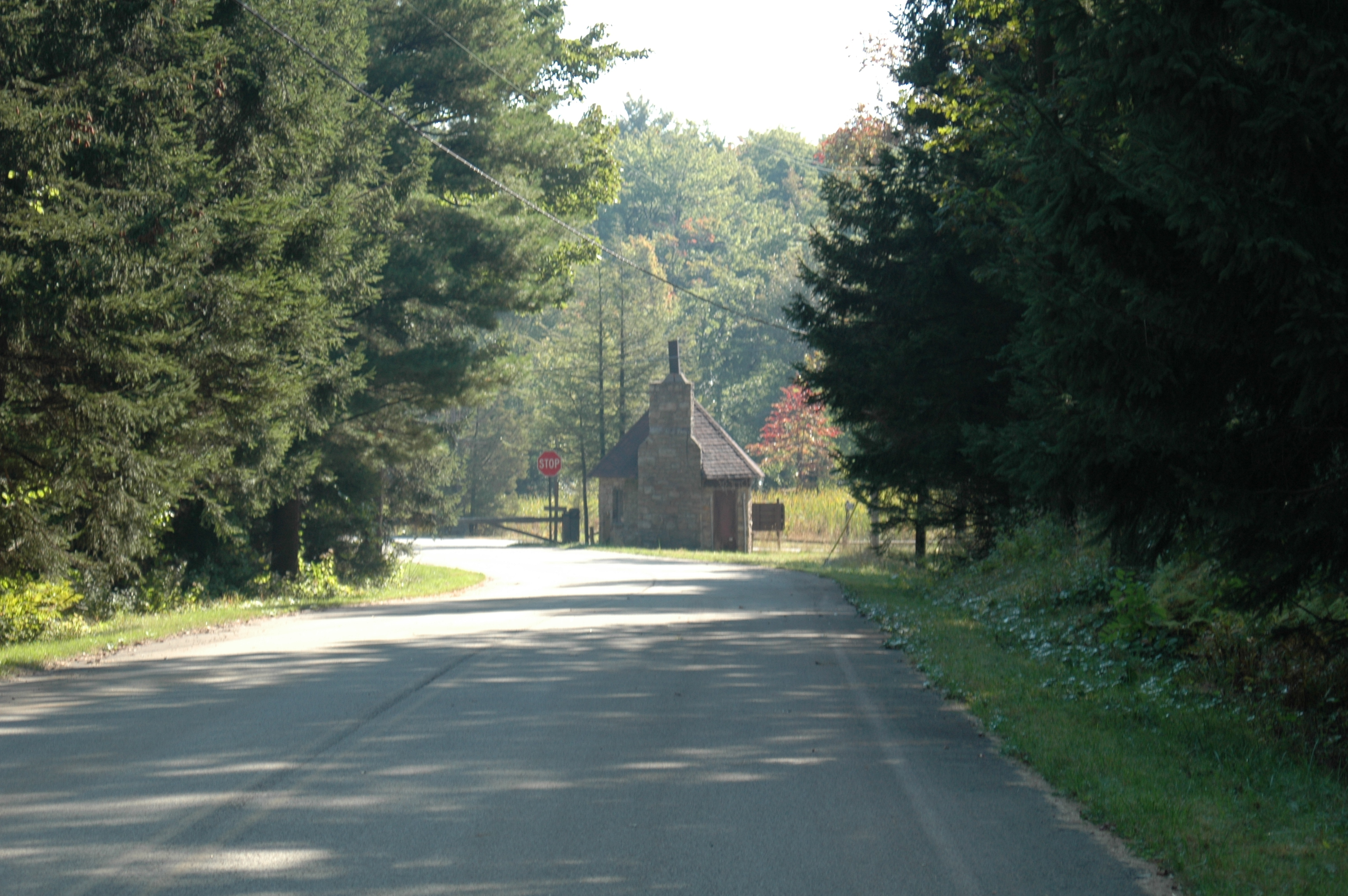
- Near the entrance to the ski area

- Location within Pennsylvania Location within the United States
- Interactive map of Laurel Mountain State Park
- Location: Westmoreland and Somerset counties, Pennsylvania, United States
- Coordinates: 40°07′04″N 79°10′35″W
- Area: 492.6 acres (199.3 ha)
- Elevation: 2,723 feet (830 m)
- Established: 1964
- Administrator: Pennsylvania Department of Conservation and Natural Resources
- Website: Official website
- Pennsylvania State Parks

Laurel Mountain State Park is a 493-acre (200 ha) Pennsylvania state park in Ligonier Township, Westmoreland County and Jenner Township, Somerset County, Pennsylvania in the United States.

== Geography ==
Laurel Mountain State Park is 2 miles (3.2 km) south of U.S. Route 30 near Jennerstown. Several communications and broadcast towers are located on the top of Laurel Mountain, which serves the eastern Pittsburgh area and Greater Johnstown.

== History ==
The park was opened as a private ski area in 1939 by General Richard K. Mellon for his private club. It was one of the first ski areas in Pennsylvania and although World War II caused the ski resort to be temporarily closed, in the years following the war, it was the "Ski Capital of Pennsylvania". General Mellon leased the land to the state in 1963 and gave it to the state in 1964, when it officially became "Laurel Mountain State Park".

This state park is a ski resort that closed for business in 2005. The ski assets of the park were purchased by Seven Springs Mountain Resort in November 2008 with the goal of reopening the slopes. They would be operated under contract with PA-DCNR by the management of Seven Springs. Seven Springs signed a 10-year lease with PA-DCNR in November 2009. This allows the ski company to move ahead with plans to renovate and reopen the ski slopes.
