= Seven Springs, Pennsylvania =

Borough in Pennsylvania, US

- Borough
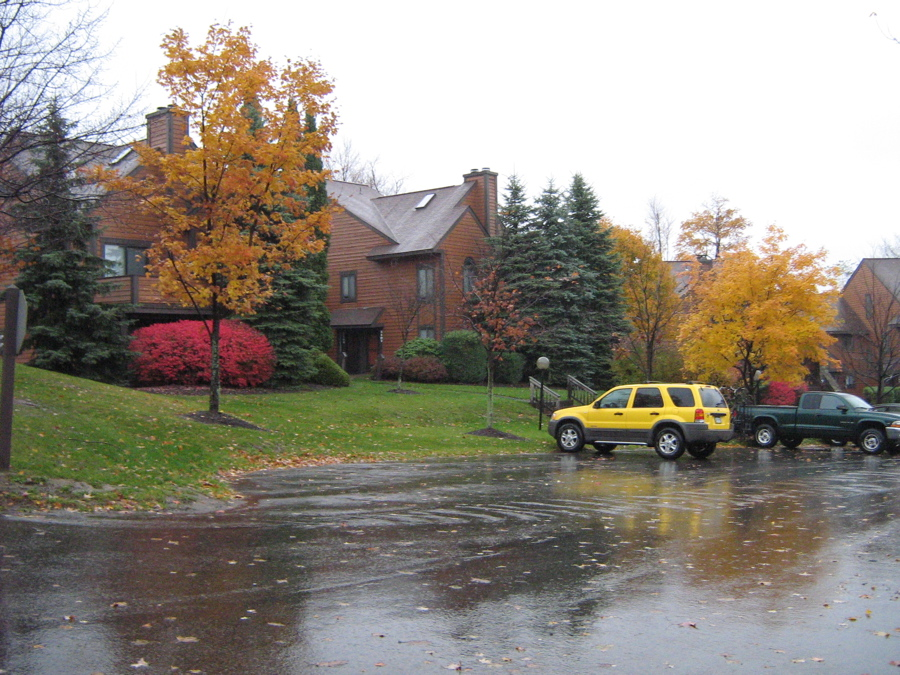
- Condominium in Seven Springs

- Location of Seven Springs in Somerset and Fayette Counties, Pennsylvania.

- Location within Pennsylvania Location within the United States
- Coordinates: 40°01′23″N 79°17′34″W
- Country: United States
- State: Pennsylvania
- County: Somerset, Fayette
- Established: January 1, 1964

Government
  - Mayor: Michael K. Mohr

Area
  - Total: 1.08 sq mi (2.79 km^{2})
  - Land: 1.08 sq mi (2.79 km^{2})
  - Water: 0 sq mi (0.00 km^{2})
- Elevation: 2,530 ft (770 m)

Population (2020)
  - Total: 26
  - Estimate (2019): 24
  - Density: 22/sq mi (8.6/km^{2})
- Time zone: UTC−4 (EST)
  - Summer (DST): UTC−5 (EDT)
- Area codes: 724, 814
- FIPS code: 42-69336

Seven Springs is a borough in Somerset and Fayette counties in the U.S. state of Pennsylvania. The Fayette County portion of the borough and resort are part of the Pittsburgh metropolitan area, and the Somerset County portion is part of the Johnstown Metropolitan Area. As of the 2020 census, Seven Springs had a population of 26.

The borough limits encompass the majority of Seven Springs Mountain Resort in Somerset County, although the resort's business address may be listed as "Champion", referring to an unincorporated village located 7 miles (11 km) to the northwest in Fayette County.

The borough is served by the Connellsville Area School District.

== Geography ==
Seven Springs is located at 40°1′23″N 79°17′34″W (40.022939, -79.292850). Most of the borough is located in western Somerset County, but a portion extends west into the northeastern corner of Fayette County.

According to the United States Census Bureau, the borough has an area of 1.08 square miles (2.80 km^{2}), all land.

Seven Springs has the distinction of being, in elevation, the highest borough in Pennsylvania, at 2,530 feet (770 m). It sits along the crest of Laurel Hill, a major north–south ridge of the Allegheny Mountains.

The borough is mostly surrounded by Middlecreek Township, Somerset County, but also borders Jefferson Township, Somerset County, and Saltlick Township, Fayette County.

== Demographics ==
Historical population
Census	Pop.	Note	%±
1970	37		—
1980	30		−18.9%
1990	22		−26.7%
2000	127		477.3%
2010	26		−79.5%
2020	26		0.0%

As of the census of 2000, there were 127 people, 63 households, and 38 families residing in the borough. The population density was 110.1 inhabitants per square mile (42.5/km^{2}). There were 888 housing units at an average density of 770.0 per square mile (297.3/km^{2}). The racial makeup of the borough was 99.21% White and 0.79% Asian. Hispanic or Latino of any race were 0.79% of the population.

There were 63 households, out of which 17.5% had children under the age of 18 living with them, 57.1% were married couples living together, 3.2% had a female householder with no husband present, and 38.1% were non-families. 34.9% of all households were made up of individuals, and 9.5% had someone living alone who was 65 years of age or older. The average household size was 2.02 and the average family size was 2.56.

In the borough the population was spread out, with 16.5% under the age of 18, 2.4% from 18 to 24, 29.9% from 25 to 44, 34.6% from 45 to 64, and 16.5% who were 65 years of age or older. The median age was 46 years. For every 100 females, there were 108.2 males. For every 100 females age 18 and over, there were 116.3 males.

The median income for a household in the borough was $48,750, and the median income for a family was $50,833. Males had a median income of $65,208 versus $24,167 for females. The per capita income for the borough was $42,131. There were no families and 4.6% of the population living below the poverty line, including no under eighteens and none of those over 64.

== Climate ==
Seven Springs has a humid continental climate (Dfb) that is influenced by the high elevation significantly enough that the area feels slightly more like a cooler version of the climate zone during the winter months. Due to its high elevation, the area is colder much of the winter than Altoona, Johnstown, or State College, despite being well south of those locations. During the summer months, the area is a retreat for other Pennsylvanians, with high temperatures averaging approximately 10 degrees cooler than those of Pittsburgh and eastern portions of the state. Seven Springs has recorded many record lows and the all-time low is quite close to the state's all-time coldest temperature.

Climate data for Seven Springs, Pennsylvania
Month	Jan	Feb	Mar	Apr	May	Jun	Jul	Aug	Sep	Oct	Nov	Dec	Year
Record high °F (°C)	65 (18)	71 (22)	79 (26)	84 (29)	89 (32)	91 (33)	93 (34)	92 (33)	89 (32)	84 (29)	74 (23)	70 (21)	93 (34)
Mean daily maximum °F (°C)	28 (−2)	30 (−1)	39 (4)	53 (12)	62 (17)	70 (21)	77 (25)	75 (24)	67 (19)	58 (14)	41 (5)	32 (0)	51 (11)
Mean daily minimum °F (°C)	8 (−13)	10 (−12)	19 (−7)	27 (−3)	39 (4)	45 (7)	58 (14)	57 (14)	47 (8)	35 (2)	26 (−3)	15 (−9)	36 (2)
Record low °F (°C)	−36 (−38)	−32 (−36)	−21 (−29)	−4 (−20)	11 (−12)	22 (−6)	32 (0)	29 (−2)	21 (−6)	9 (−13)	−10 (−23)	−23 (−31)	−36 (−38)
Average precipitation inches (mm)	3.1 (79)	2.9 (74)	3.5 (89)	3.9 (99)	4.5 (110)	4.7 (120)	5.0 (130)	4.8 (120)	4.4 (110)	3.1 (79)	4.0 (100)	3.9 (99)	47.9 (1,220)
Average snowfall inches (cm)	34.0 (86)	30.8 (78)	27.7 (70)	10.8 (27)	3.2 (8.1)	—	0 (0)	0 (0)	—	2.7 (6.9)	14.8 (38)	28.1 (71)	153.1 (389)
