= Seven Springs Mountain Resort =

All-season resort in Pennsylvania, US

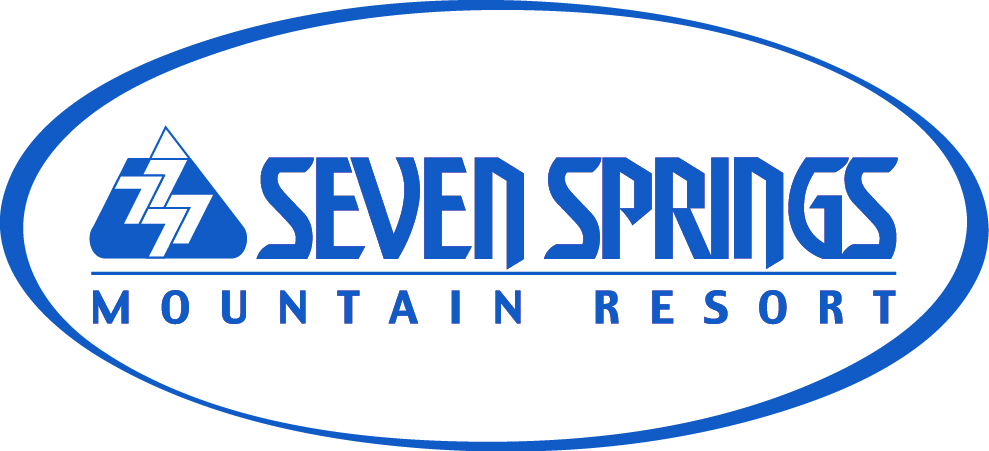

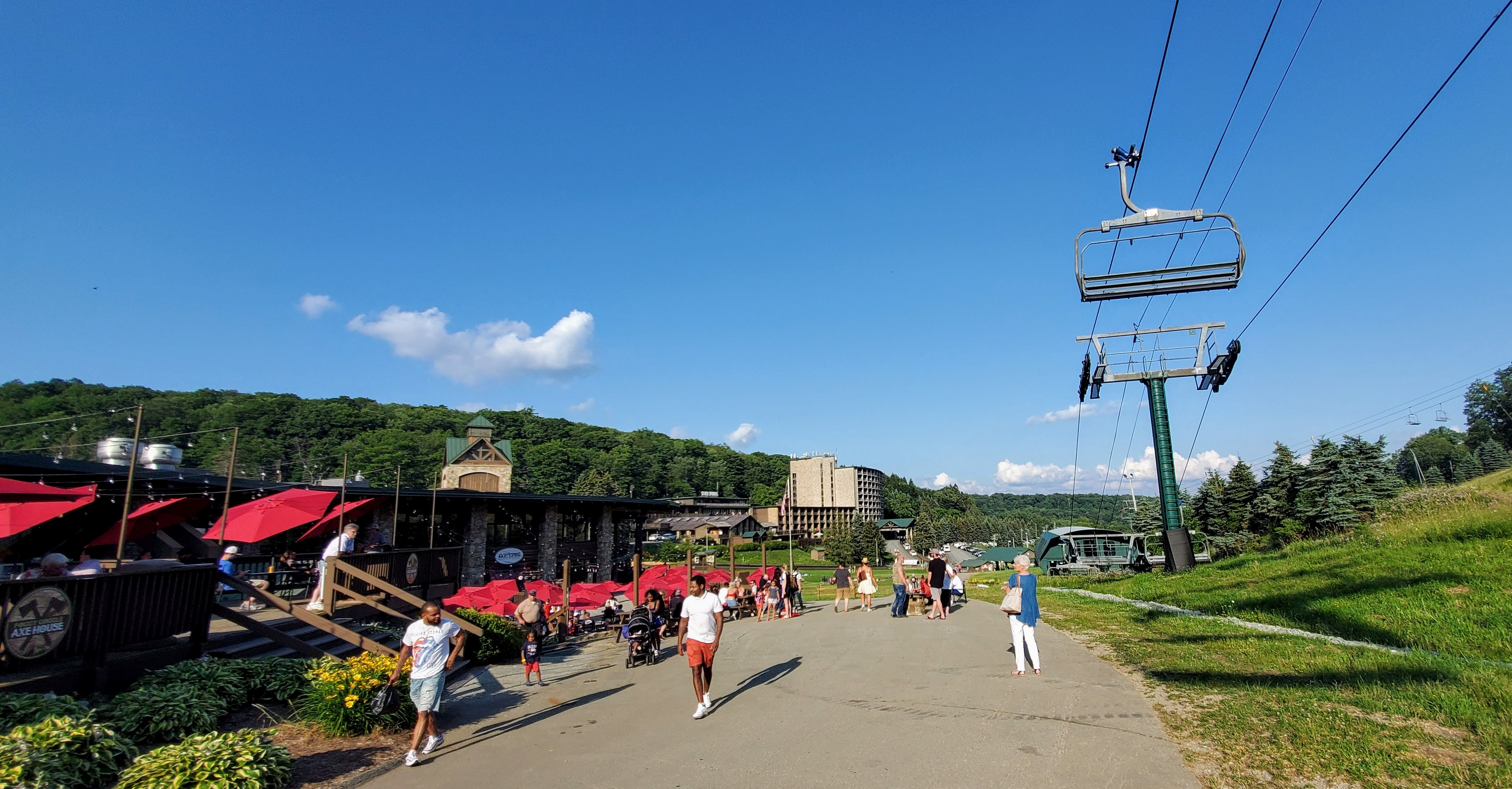
- Seven Springs Mountain Resort

- Location in Pennsylvania
- Location: Seven Springs, Pennsylvania, United States
- Nearest city: Champion; Pittsburgh
- Coordinates: 40°1′23″N 79°17′34″W
- Vertical: 750 ft (230 m)
- Top elevation: 2,994 ft (913 m)
- Base elevation: 2,240 ft (680 m)
- Skiable area: 285 acres (1.15 km^{2})
- Trails: 40 trails 35% Beginner; 40% Intermediate; 15% Advanced; 10% Expert
- Longest run: Lost Boy; 1.3 miles (2.1 km)
- Lift system: 14 total: 10 chairs; 1 surface; 3 conveyor
- Lift capacity: 26,620/hour
- Terrain parks: 7
- Snowfall: 135 in (3,400 mm)
- Snowmaking: Yes
- Night skiing: Yes (75% coverage)
- Website: 7springs.com

Seven Springs Mountain Resort is an all-season resort located in the borough of Seven Springs, Pennsylvania. It has a high elevation for a Pennsylvania ski area, at 2,994 feet (913 m) above sea level. Activities include biking, canopy touring, ziplining, sporting clays, fishing, hiking and golfing in the summer and skiing, snowboarding and snow tubing in the winter. The ski season at Seven Springs typically begins in late November and continues to mid-April, depending on the weather.

Seven Springs hosts events such as the adventure race Mud on the Mountain, Brewski Fest, Fireworks and Food Trucks, Rib and Wing Festival, Wine Festival, Autumnfest, Pond Skim and Toyotathon.

In 2021, Seven Springs became part of Vail Resorts.

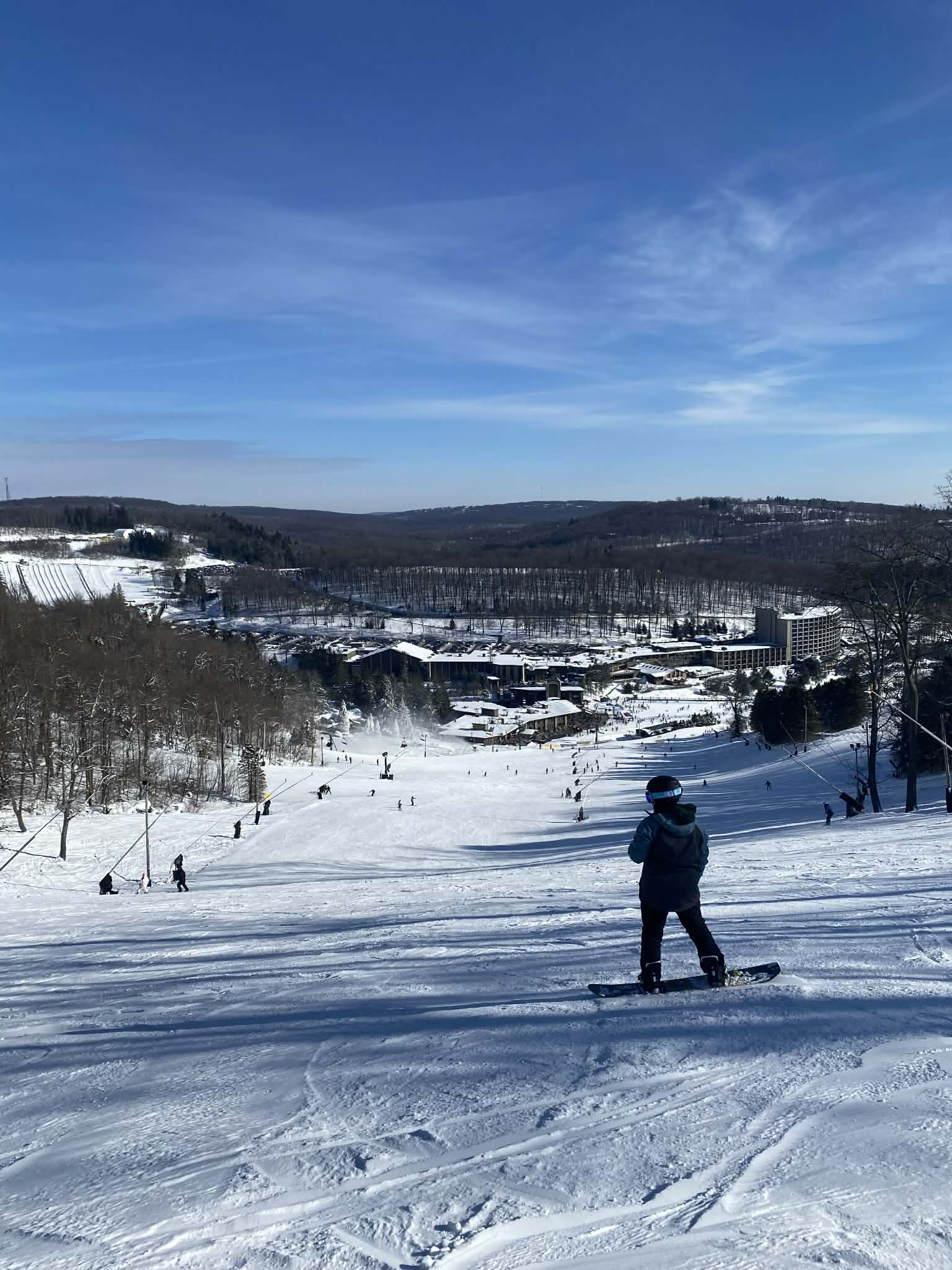
View from atop the mountain, looking down towards the Main Lodge and hotel.

== Lift statistics ==
Type	Length (feet)	Hourly capacity
Two highspeed six-passenger chairlifts	2,600	6,000
Three quad chairlifts	2,600–4,202	7,000
Five triple chairlifts	2,320–4,410	7,800
One rope tow	N/A	2,100
Three Magic Carpet conveyors	N/A	4,500

== History ==
=== 1932 ===
In 1932, German immigrants from Bavaria Adolph and Helen Dupre bought 275 acres and founded Seven Springs farm on the site of the later resort. The Dupres installed a rope tow for local skiers, and eventually expanded to multiple lifts, which became the Seven Springs Resort.

=== 2007 ===
In Fall 2007, the hotel at Seven Springs received a full renovation and redecoration. 414 hotel rooms were planned for refurbishment.

Another project opened in 2007 was a second high-speed six-passenger chairlift serving the Gunnar slope at the North Face. The Gunnar Express Lift was constructed in place of the Gunnar Triple Chairlift.

=== 2009 ===
Transworld Snowboarding magazine ranked the resort as the East Coast's top halfpipe and third place terrain parks.

=== 2010 ===
The 2010–2011 winter ski and snowboard season was marked with Transworld Snowboarding magazine again selecting Seven Springs as the East Coast's best halfpipe.

=== 2021 ===
On December 31, 2021, Vail Resorts announced it had acquired Seven Springs, Hidden Valley Resort, and Laurel Mountain Ski Area for approximately $118 million.

== Gallery ==
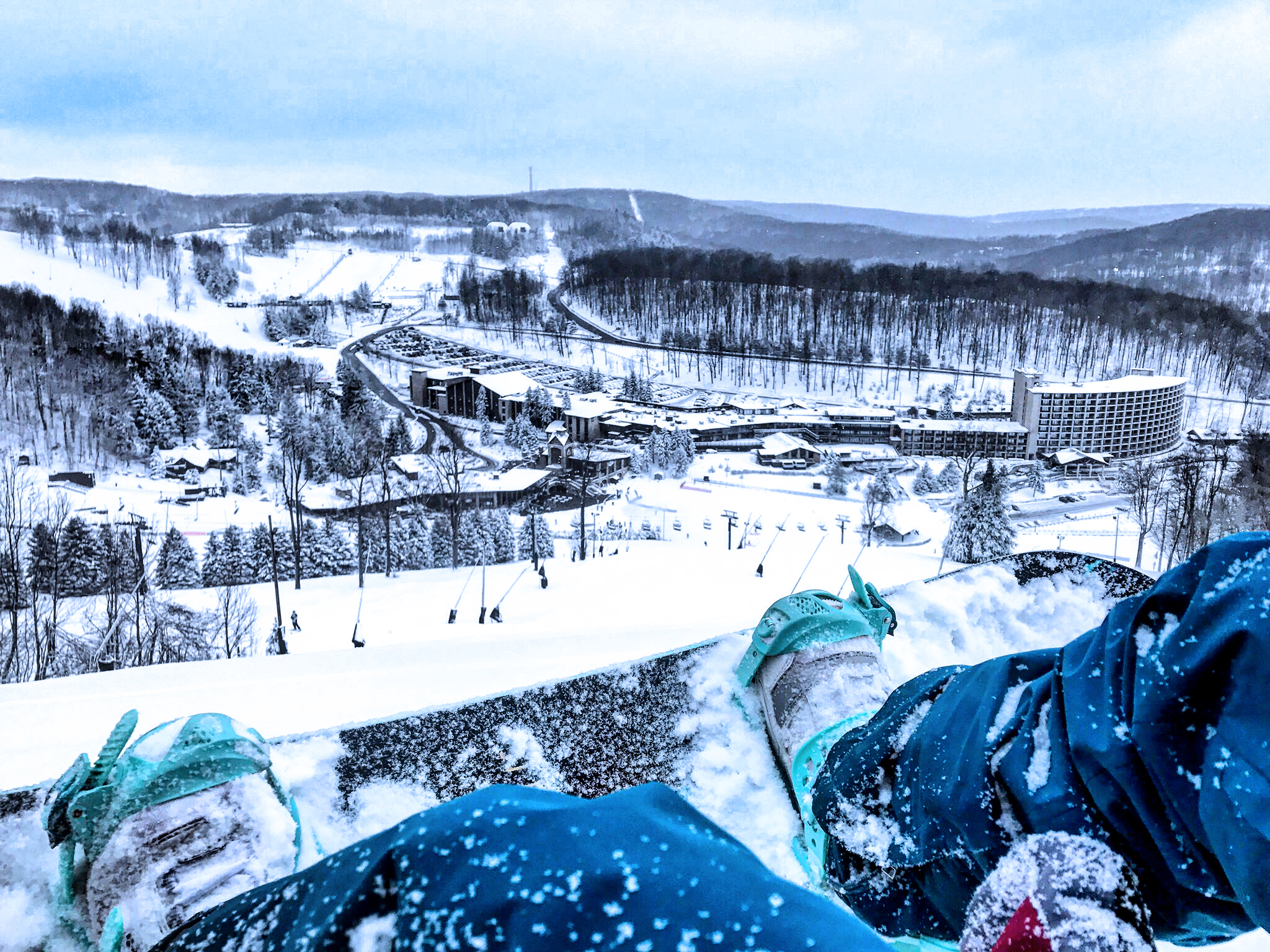

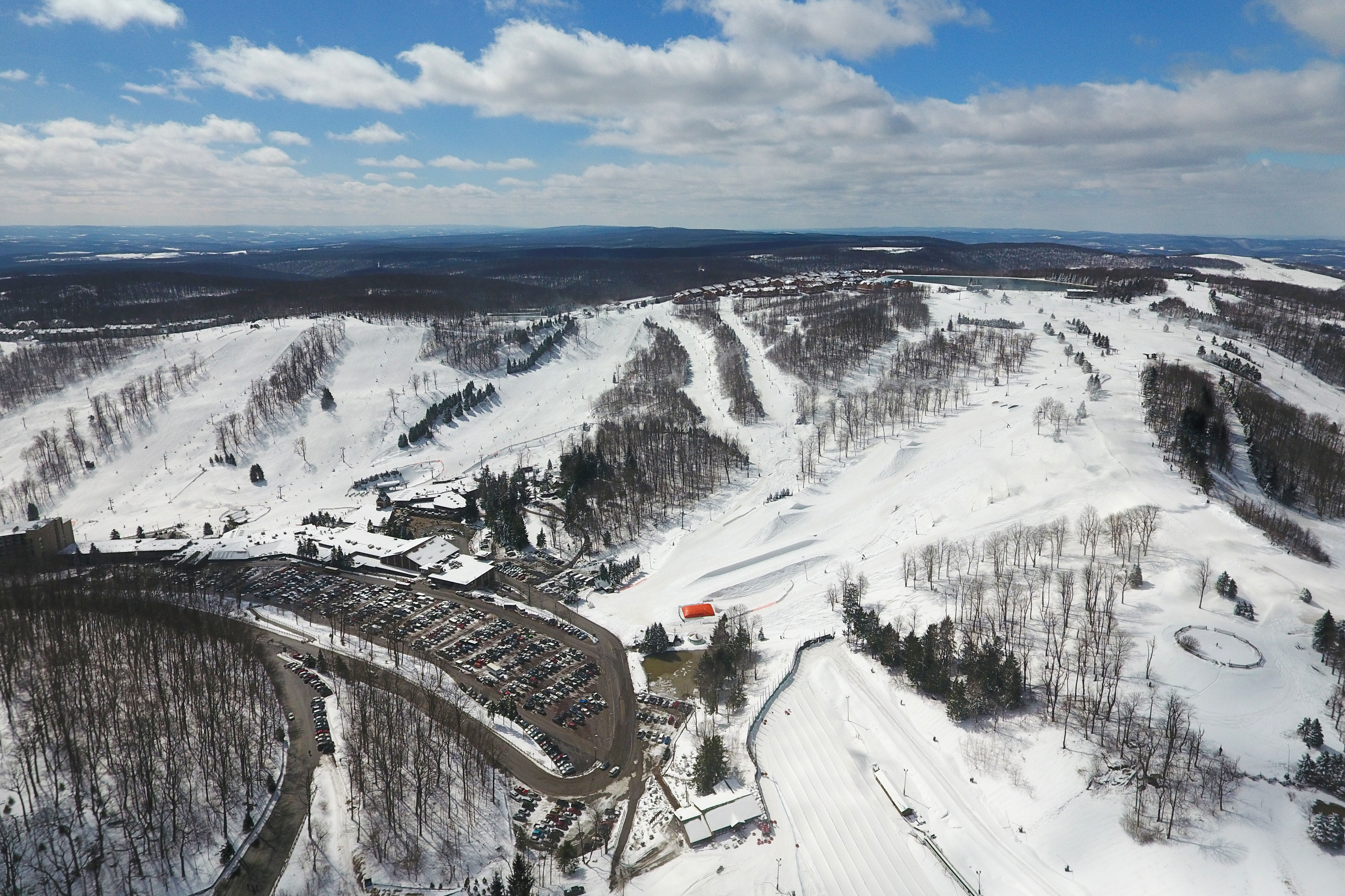

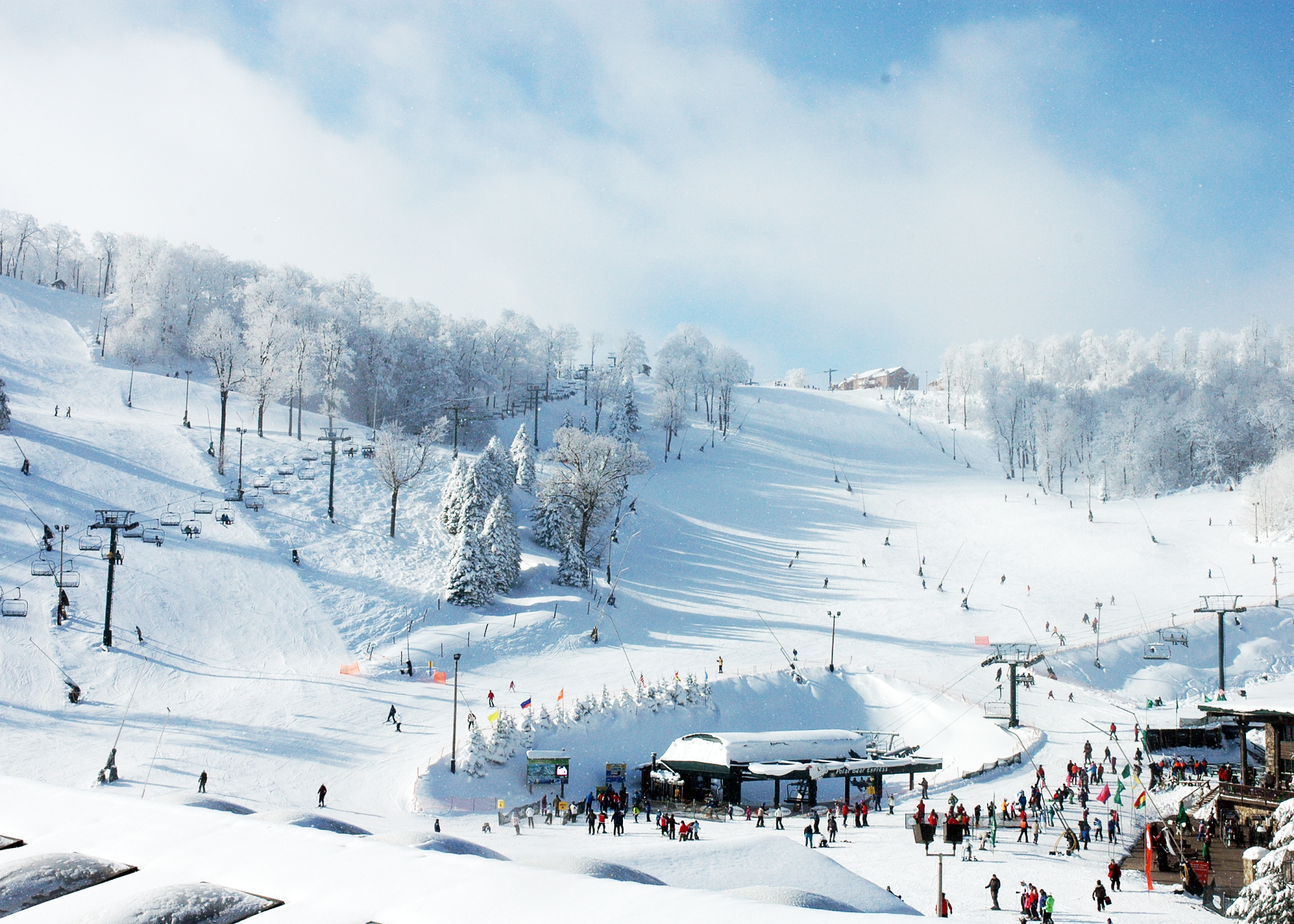

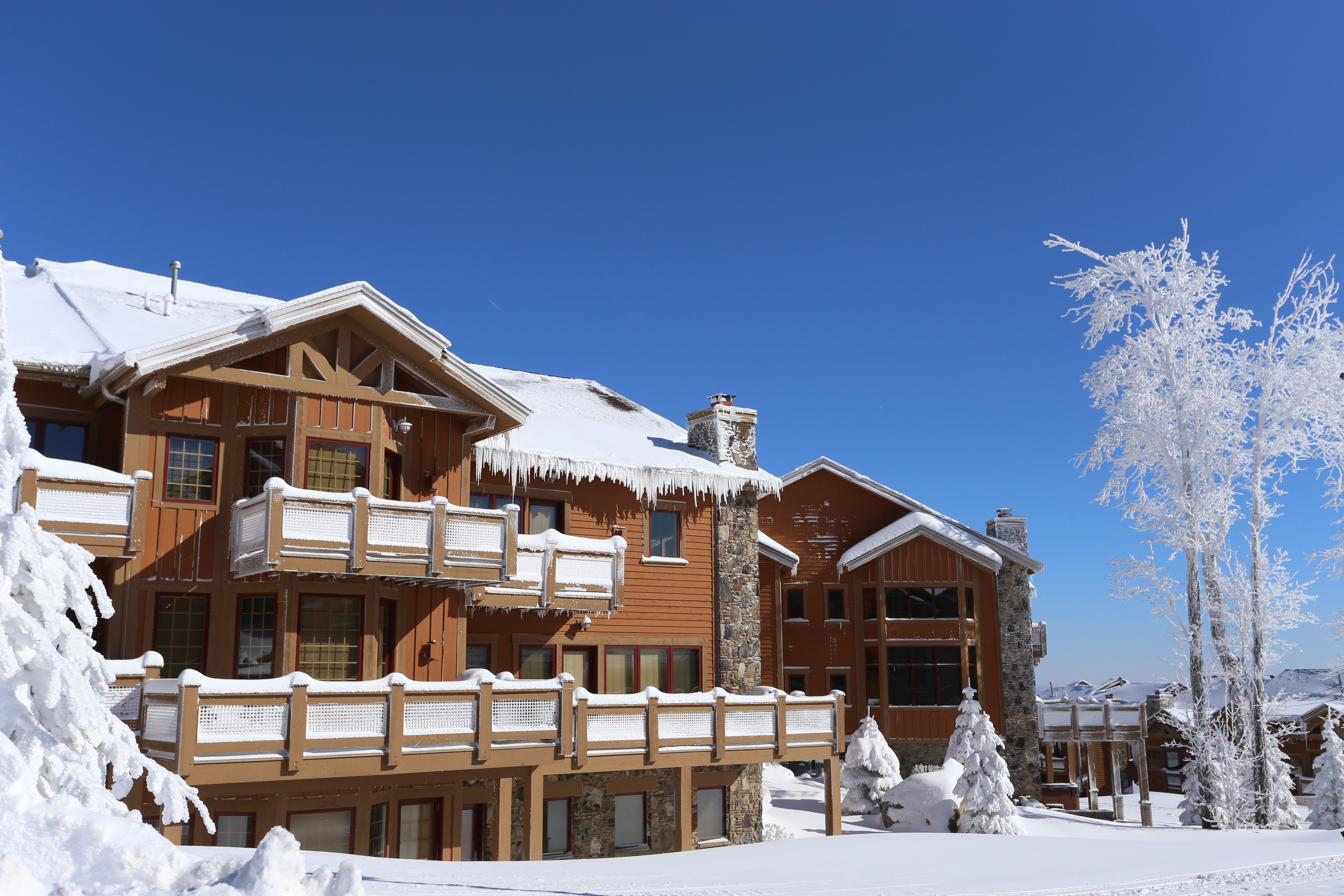

== See also ==
- List of ski areas and resorts in the United States
