= List of birds of Maryland =

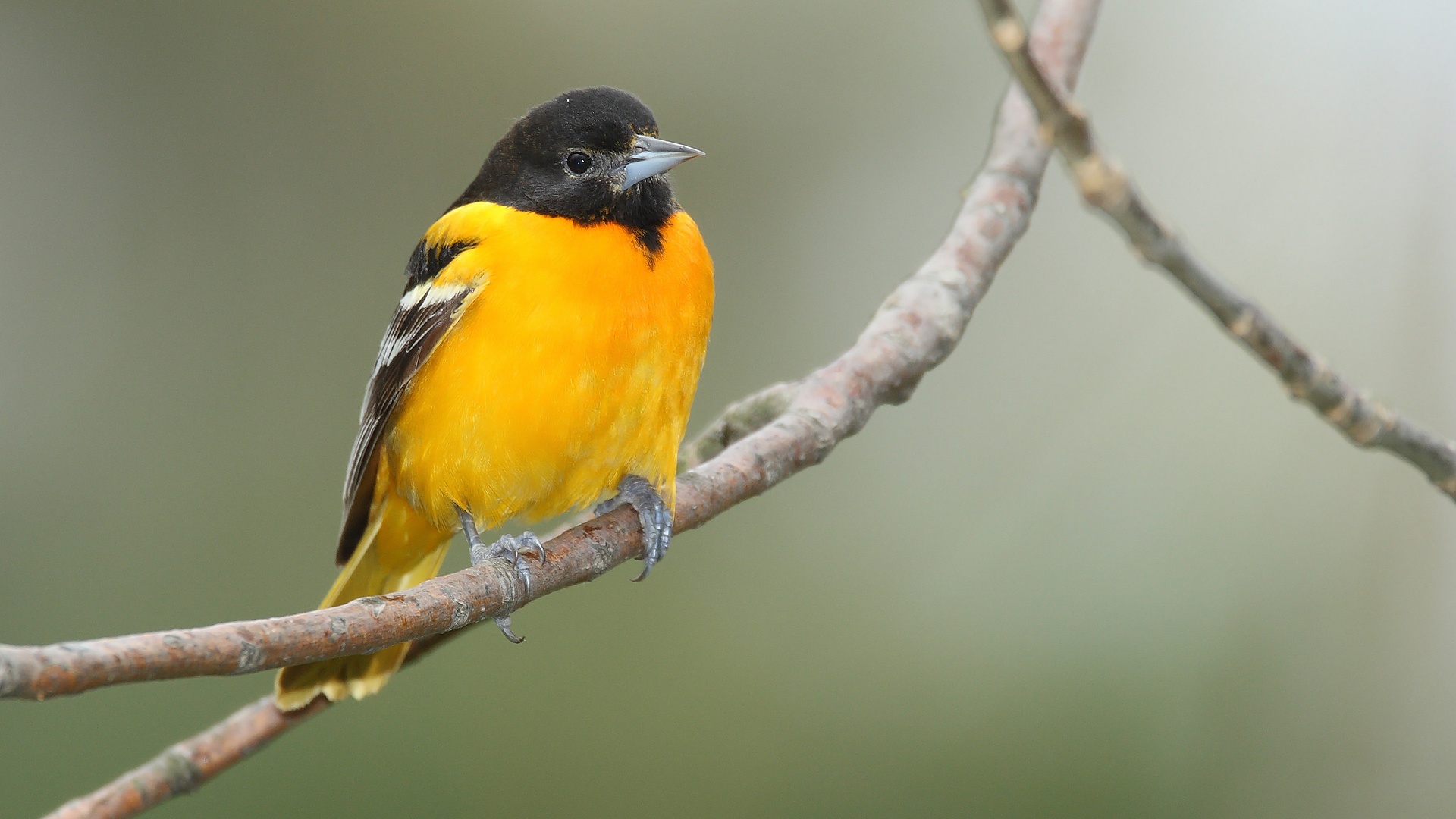
The Baltimore oriole is the state bird of Maryland.

This list of birds of Maryland includes species credibly documented in the U.S. state of Maryland and accepted by the Maryland / District of Columbia Records Committee (MRC) of the Maryland Ornithological Society as of 2022. There are 456 species included in the official list. Eight additional species of questionable origin and two of exotic origin per the MRC are also included in this page. Of the 460 species, 121 are rare anywhere in the state, 64 are rare in some part of the state, six have been introduced to North America, two are extinct, and two have been extirpated. Three additional accidental species have been added from different sources.

This list is presented in the taxonomic sequence of the Check-list of North and Middle American Birds, 7th edition through the 62nd Supplement, published by the American Ornithological Society (AOS). Common and scientific names are also those of the Check-list, except that the common names of families are from the Clements taxonomy because the AOS list does not include them.

Unless otherwise noted, all species listed below are considered to occur regularly in Maryland as permanent residents, summer or winter visitors, or migrants. The following tags are used to annotate some species:

- (R) Rare - "Reviewable if found anywhere in Maryland" per the MRC
- (R*) Rare (limited area) - "Reviewable if found in certain specified ranges in Maryland" per the MRC
- (QO) Questionable origin - "Accepted species that may or may not be wild or naturally occurring" per the MRC
- (EO) Exotic origin - "Accepted species whose natural history precludes wild or natural occurrence" per the MRC
- (I) Introduced - a species that has been introduced to North America by the actions of humans, either directly or indirectly
- (Xt) Extinct - a recent species that no longer exists
- (Xp) Extirpated wild - a natural or wild species which is no longer found in Maryland, but still exists elsewhere
- (Xx) Extirpated exotic - a formerly established introduced species which no longer occurs in Maryland

== Ducks, geese, and waterfowl ==
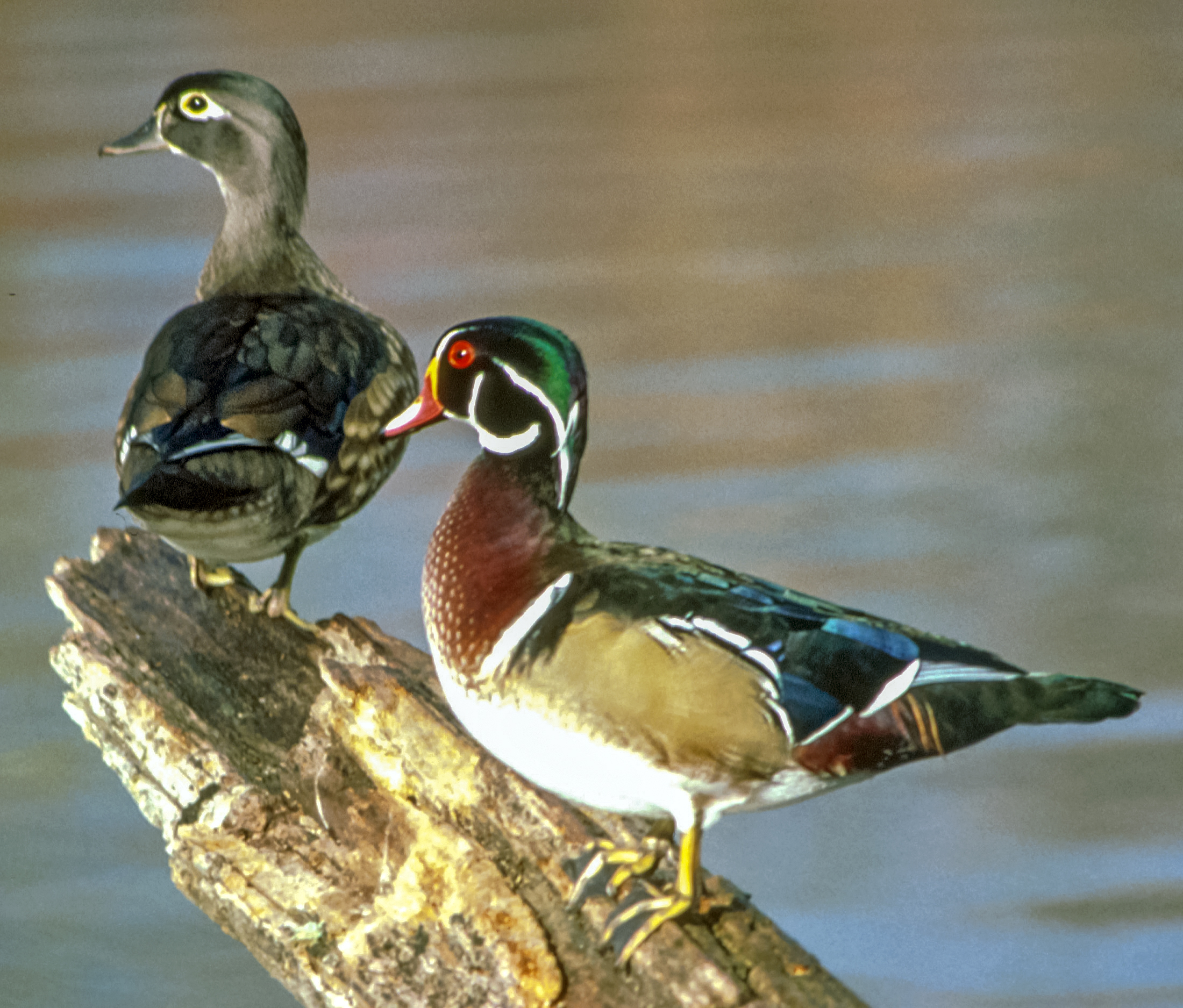
Wood ducks

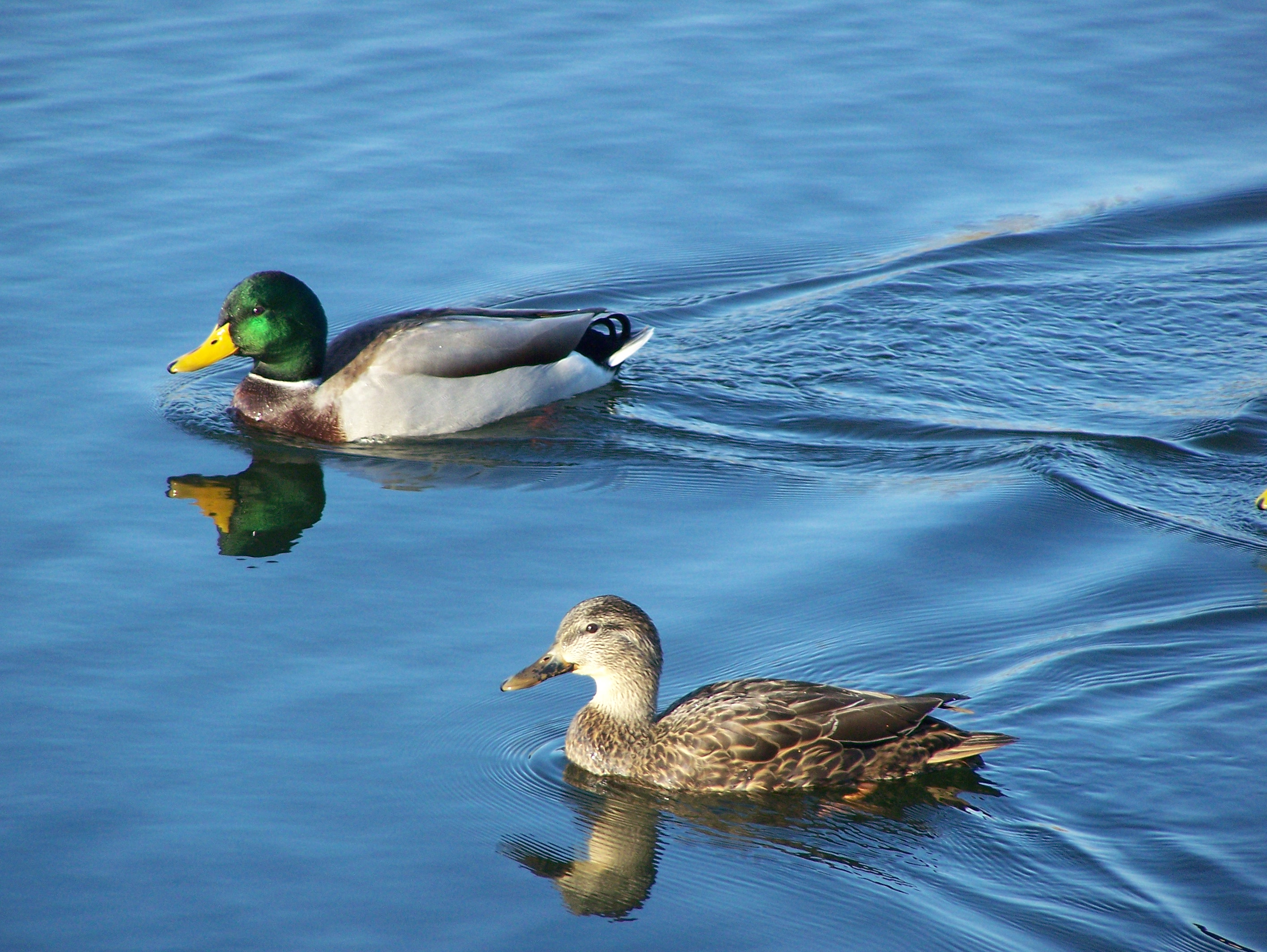
Mallards

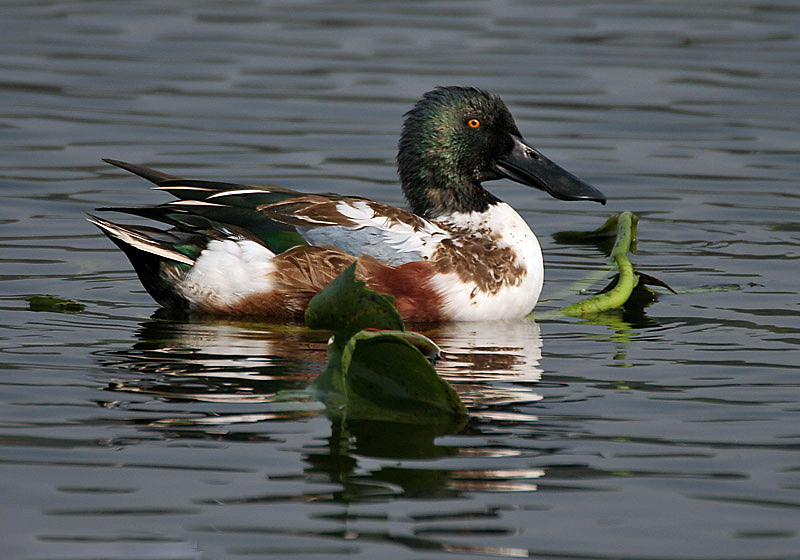
Northern shoveler

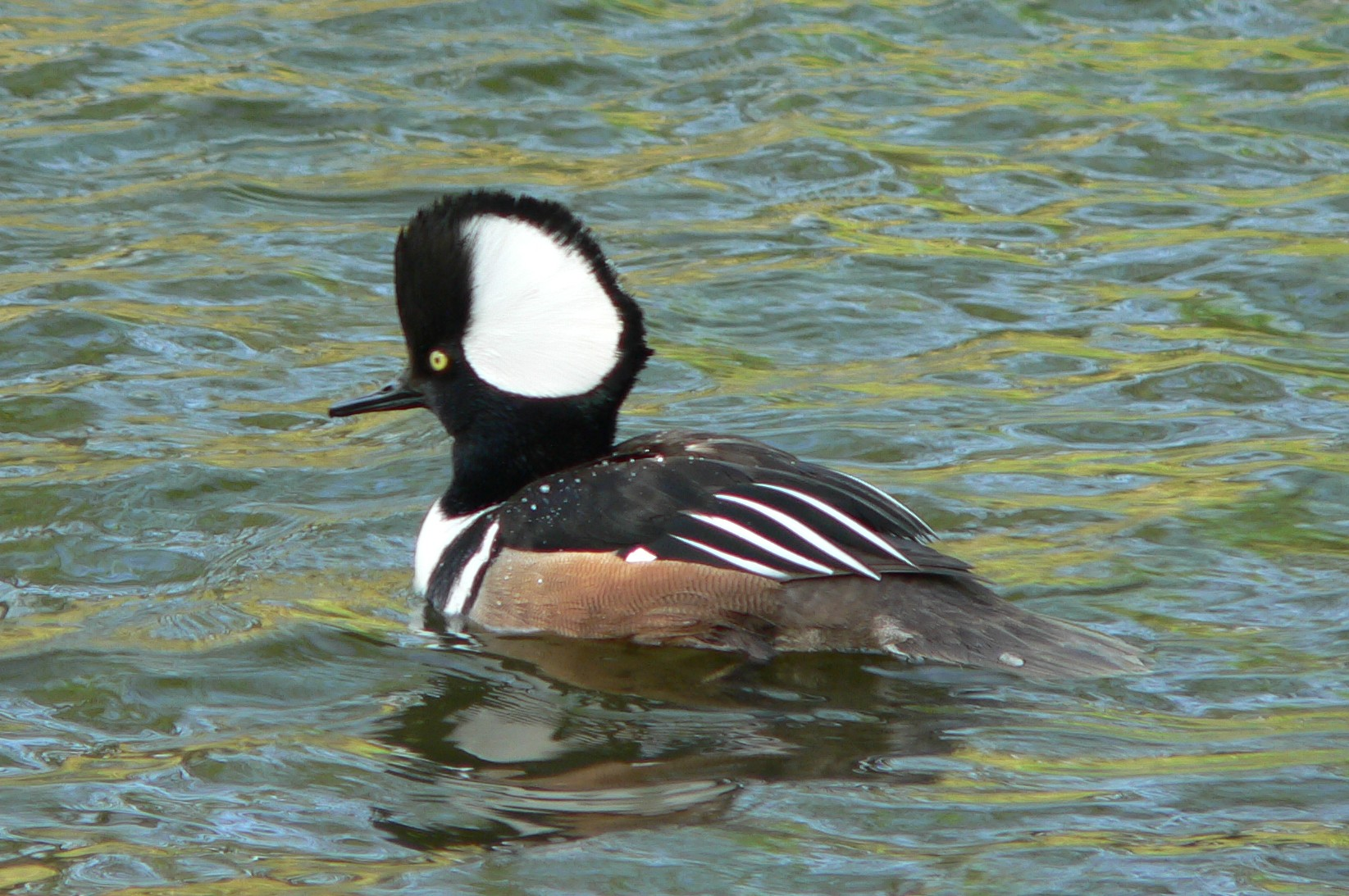
Hooded merganser

Order: Anseriformes Family: Anatidae

The family Anatidae includes the ducks and most duck-like waterfowl, such as geese and swans. These birds are adapted to an aquatic existence with webbed feet, bills that are flattened to a greater or lesser extent, and feathers that are excellent at shedding water due to special oils. Forty-six confirmed species, two of questionable origin, and one of exotic origin have been recorded in Maryland.

- Black-bellied whistling-duck, Dendrocygna autumnalis (R)
- Fulvous whistling-duck, Dendrocygna bicolor (R)
- Snow goose, Anser caerulescens
- Ross's goose, Anser rossii
- Greater white-fronted goose, Anser albifrons
- Pink-footed goose, Anser brachyrhynchus (R)
- Brant, Branta bernicla (R*)
- Barnacle goose, Branta leucopsis (R)
- Cackling goose, Branta hutchinsii
- Canada goose, Branta canadensis
- Mute swan, Cygnus olor (I)
- Black swan, Cygnus atratus (EO) (not on the AOS Check-list; scientific name and placement are per Clements)
- Trumpeter swan, Cygnus buccinator (Xp)
- Tundra swan, Cygnus columbianus
- Wood duck, Aix sponsa
- Baikal teal, Sibirionetta formosa (QO)
- Blue-winged teal, Spatula discors
- Cinnamon teal, Spatula cyanoptera (R)
- Northern shoveler, Spatula clypeata
- Gadwall, Mareca strepera
- Falcated duck, Mareca falcata (QO)
- Eurasian wigeon, Mareca penelope
- American wigeon, Mareca americana
- Mallard, Anas platyrhynchos
- Mottled duck, Anas fulvigula (R)
- American black duck, Anas rubripes
- Northern pintail, Anas acuta
- Green-winged teal, Anas crecca
- Canvasback, Aythya valisineria
- Redhead, Aythya americana
- Ring-necked duck, Aythya collaris
- Tufted duck, Aythya fuligula (R)
- Greater scaup, Aythya marila
- Lesser scaup, Aythya affinis
- King eider, Somateria spectabilis (R*)
- Common eider, Somateria mollissima (R*)
- Harlequin duck, Histrionicus histrionicus (R*)
- Surf scoter, Melanitta perspicillata
- White-winged scoter, Melanitta deglandi
- Black scoter, Melanitta americana
- Long-tailed duck, Clangula hyemalis
- Bufflehead, Bucephala albeola
- Common goldeneye, Bucephala clangula
- Barrow's goldeneye, Bucephala clangula (R)
- Hooded merganser, Lophodytes cucullatus
- Common merganser, Mergus merganser
- Red-breasted merganser, Mergus serrator
- Masked duck, Nomonyx dominicus (R)
- Ruddy duck, Oxyura jamaicensis

== New World quail ==
Order: Galliformes Family: Odontophoridae

The New World quails are small, plump terrestrial birds only distantly related to the Old World quails, but named for their similar appearance and habits. One confirmed species and one of questionable origin have been recorded in Maryland.

- Northern bobwhite, Colinus virginianus
- Callipepla species, Callipepla sp. (QO)

== Pheasants, grouse, and allies ==
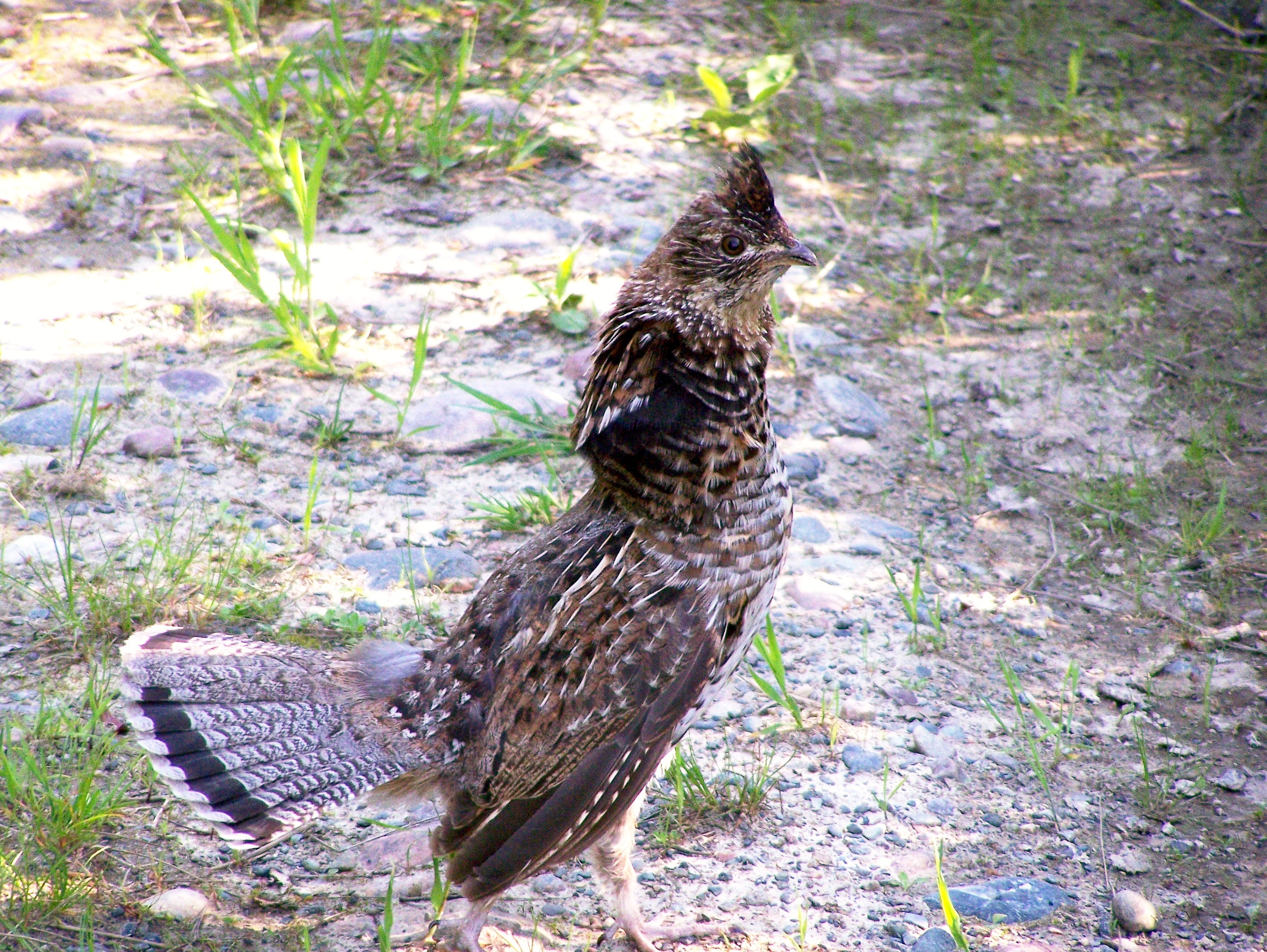
Ruffed grouse

Order: Galliformes Family: Phasianidae

Phasianidae consists of the pheasants and their allies. These are terrestrial species, variable in size but generally plump with broad relatively short wings. Many species are gamebirds or have been domesticated as a food source for humans. Turkeys have a distinctive fleshy wattle that hangs from the underside of the beak and a fleshy protuberance that hangs from the top of its beak called a snood. As with many galliform species, the female (the hen) is smaller and much less colorful than the male (the tom). With wingspans of 1.5–1.8 metres (4.9–5.9 ft), the turkeys are the largest birds in the open forests in which they live and are rarely mistaken for any other species. Grouse inhabit temperate and subarctic regions of the Northern Hemisphere. In all of Maryland's species, males are polygamous and have elaborate courtship displays. These heavily built birds have legs feathered to the toes. Most species are year-round residents and do not migrate. Four species of Phasianidae have been recorded in Maryland.

- Wild turkey, Meleagris gallopavo
- Ruffed grouse, Bonasa umbellus (R*)
- Greater prairie-chicken, Tympanuchus cupido (Xp)
  - Heath hen, T. c. cupido (Xt)
- Ring-necked pheasant, Phasianus colchicus (I) (Xx)

== Flamingoes ==
Order: Phoenicopteriformes Family: Phoenicopteridae

Flamingoes are gregarious wading birds, usually 0.91 to 1.5 metres (3.0 to 4.9 ft) in height, found in both the Western and Eastern Hemispheres. Flamingos filter-feed on shellfish and algae. Their oddly shaped beaks are specially adapted to separate mud and silt from the food they consume and, uniquely, are used upside-down. One species has been recorded in Maryland.

- American flamingo, Phoenicopterus ruber (R)

== Grebes ==
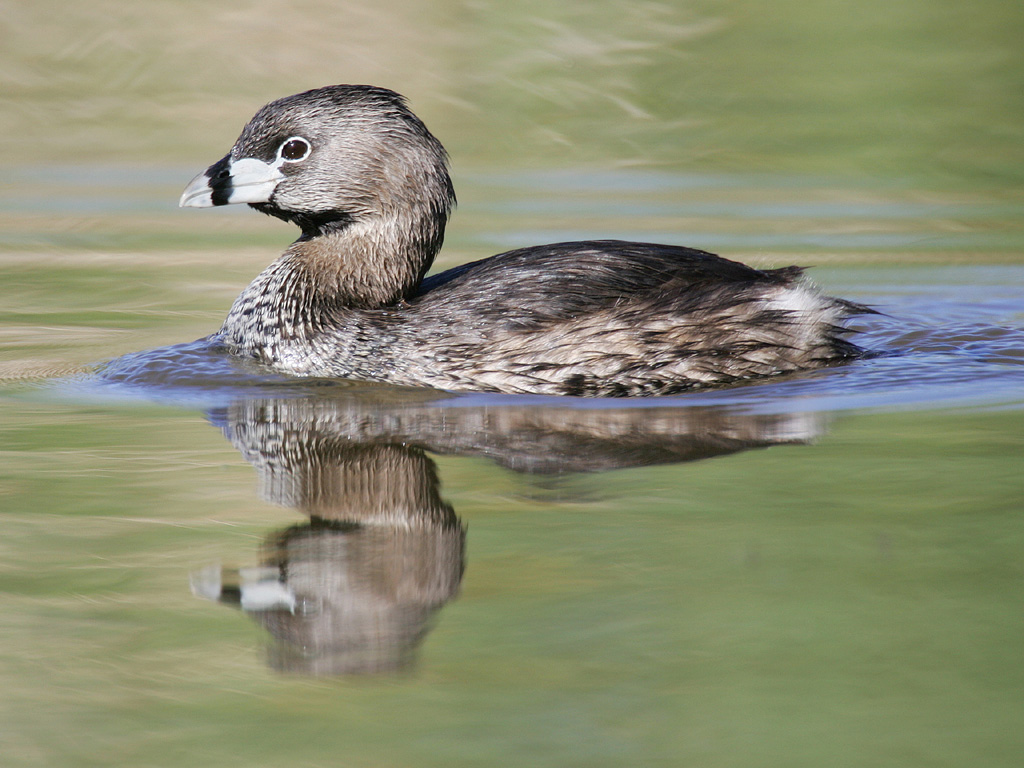
Pied-billed grebe

Order: Podicipediformes Family: Podicipedidae

Grebes are small to medium-large freshwater diving birds. They have lobed toes and are excellent swimmers and divers. However, they have their feet placed far back on the body, making them quite ungainly on land. Five species have been recorded in Maryland.

- Pied-billed grebe, Podilymbus podiceps
- Horned grebe, Podiceps auritus
- Red-necked grebe, Podiceps grisegena
- Eared grebe, Podiceps nigricollis
- Western grebe, Aechmorphorus occidentalis (R)

== Pigeons and doves ==
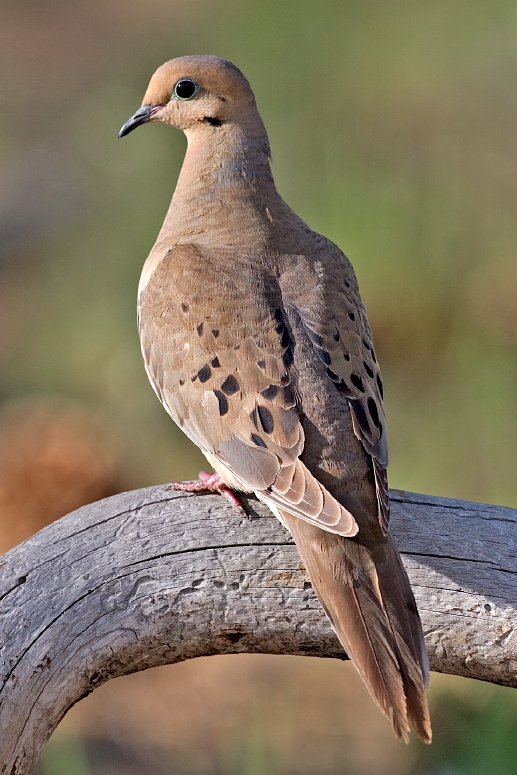
Mourning dove

Order: Columbiformes Family: Columbidae

Pigeons and doves are stout-bodied birds with short necks and short slender bills with a fleshy cere. Seven species have been recorded in Maryland.

- Rock pigeon, Columba livia (I)
- Eurasian collared-dove, Streptopelia decaocto (R) (I)
- Passenger pigeon, Ectopistes migratorius (Xt)
- Inca dove, Columbina inca (R)
- Common ground dove, Columbina passerina (R)
- White-winged dove, Zenaida asiatica (R)
- Mourning dove, Zenaida macroura

== Cuckoos ==
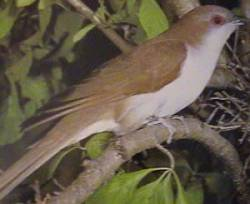
Black-billed cuckoo

Order: Cuculiformes Family: Cuculidae

The family Cuculidae includes cuckoos, roadrunners, and anis. These birds are of variable size with slender bodies, long tails, and strong legs. Three species have been recorded in Maryland.

- Groove-billed ani, Crotophaga sulcirostris (R)
- Yellow-billed cuckoo, Coccyzus americanus
- Black-billed cuckoo, Coccyzus erythropthalmus

== Nightjars and allies ==
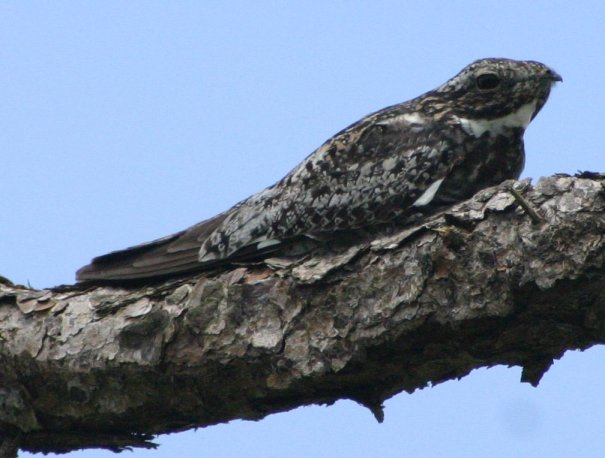
Common nighthawk

Order: Caprimulgiformes Family: Caprimulgidae

Nightjars are medium-sized nocturnal birds that usually nest on the ground. They have long wings, short legs, and very short bills. Most have small feet that are of little use for walking and long, pointed wings. Their soft plumage is cryptically colored to resemble bark or leaves. Three species have been recorded in Maryland.

- Common nighthawk, Chordeiles minor
- Chuck-will's-widow, Antrostomus carolinensis
- Eastern whip-poor-will, Antrostomus vociferus

== Swifts ==
Order: Apodiformes Family: Apodidae

The swifts are small birds which spend the majority of their lives flying. These birds have very short legs and never settle voluntarily on the ground, perching instead only on vertical surfaces. Many swifts have long swept-back wings which resemble a crescent or boomerang. One species has been recorded in Maryland.

- Chimney swift, Chaetura pelagica

== Hummingbirds ==
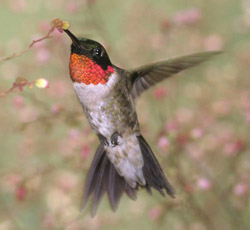
Ruby-throated hummingbird

Order: Apodiformes Family: Trochilidae

Hummingbirds are small birds capable of hovering in mid-air due to the rapid flapping of their wings. They are the only birds that can fly backwards. Seven species have been recorded in Maryland.

- Mexican violetear, Colibri thalassinus (R)
- Ruby-throated hummingbird, Archilochus colubris
- Black-chinned hummingbird, Archilochus alexandri (R)
- Anna's hummingbird, Calypte anna (R)
- Calliope hummingbird, Selasphorus calliope (R)
- Rufous hummingbird, Selasphorus rufus
- Allen's hummingbird, Selasphorus sasin (R)

== Rails, gallinules, and coots ==
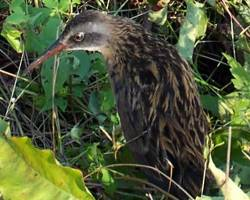
Virginia rail

Order: Gruiformes Family: Rallidae

Rallidae is a large family of small- to medium-sized birds that includes the rails, crakes, coots, and gallinules. The most typical family members occupy dense vegetation in damp environments near lakes, swamps, or rivers. In general they are shy and secretive birds, making them difficult to observe. Most species have strong legs and long toes that are well adapted to soft uneven surfaces. They tend to have short, rounded wings and to be weak fliers. Ten species have been recorded in Maryland.

- Clapper rail, Rallus crepitans (R*)
- King rail, Rallus elegans (R*)
- Virginia rail, Rallus limicola
- Corn crake, Crex crex (R)
- Sora, Porzana carolina
- Common gallinule, Gallinula galeata
- American coot, Fulica americana
- Purple gallinule, Porphyrio martinicus (R)
- Yellow rail, Coturnicops noveboracensis (R)
- Black rail, Laterallus jamaicensis (R*)

== Limpkin ==
Order: Gruiformes Family: Aramidae

The Limpkin is a large bird in a monotypic family. It is similar in appearance to the rails, but skeletally it is closer to the cranes. It is found in marshes and gets its common name from its appearance of limping as it walks.

- Limpkin, Aramus guarauna (R)

== Cranes ==
Order: Gruiformes Family: Gruidae

Cranes are large, long-legged, and long-necked birds. Unlike the similar-looking but unrelated herons, cranes fly with necks outstretched, not pulled back. Most have elaborate and noisy courting displays or "dances". One species has been recorded in Maryland.

- Sandhill crane, Antigone canadensis

== Stilts and avocets ==
Order: Charadriiformes Family: Recurvirostridae

Recurvirostridae is a family of large wading birds that includes the avocets and stilts. The avocets have long legs and long up-curved bills. The stilts have extremely long legs and long, thin, straight bills. Two species have been recorded in Maryland.

- Black-necked stilt, Himantopus mexicanus (R*)
- American avocet, Recurvirostra americana

== Oystercatchers ==
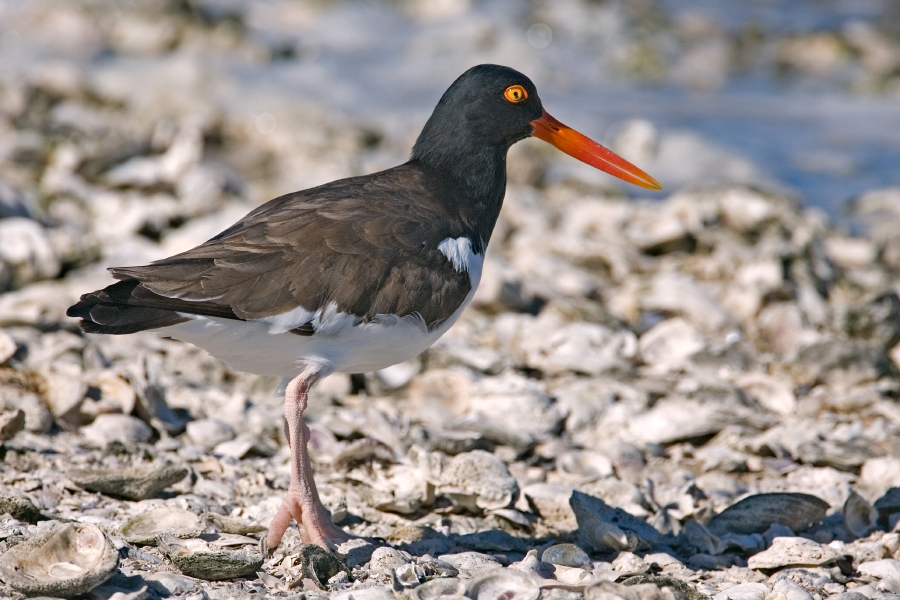
American oystercatcher

Order: Charadriiformes Family: Haematopodidae

The oystercatchers are large and noisy plover-like birds, with strong bills used for smashing or prying open molluscs. One species has been recorded in Maryland.

- American oystercatcher, Haematopus palliatus (R*)

== Plovers and lapwings ==
Order: Charadriiformes Family: Charadriidae

The family Charadriidae includes the plovers, dotterels, and lapwings. They are small- to medium-sized birds with compact bodies, short thick necks, and long, usually pointed, wings. They are usually found in open country worldwide, mostly in habitats near water. Eight confirmed species and one of questionable origin have been recorded in Maryland.

- Northern lapwing, Vanellus vanellus (R)
- Southern lapwing, Vanellus chilensis (QO)
- Black-bellied plover, Pluvialis squatarola
- American golden-plover, Pluvialis dominica
- Killdeer, Charadrius vociferus
- Semipalmated plover, Charadrius semipalmatus
- Piping plover, Charadrius melodus (R*)
- Wilson's plover, Charadrius wilsonia (R)
- Snowy plover, Charadrius nivosus (R)

== Sandpipers and allies ==
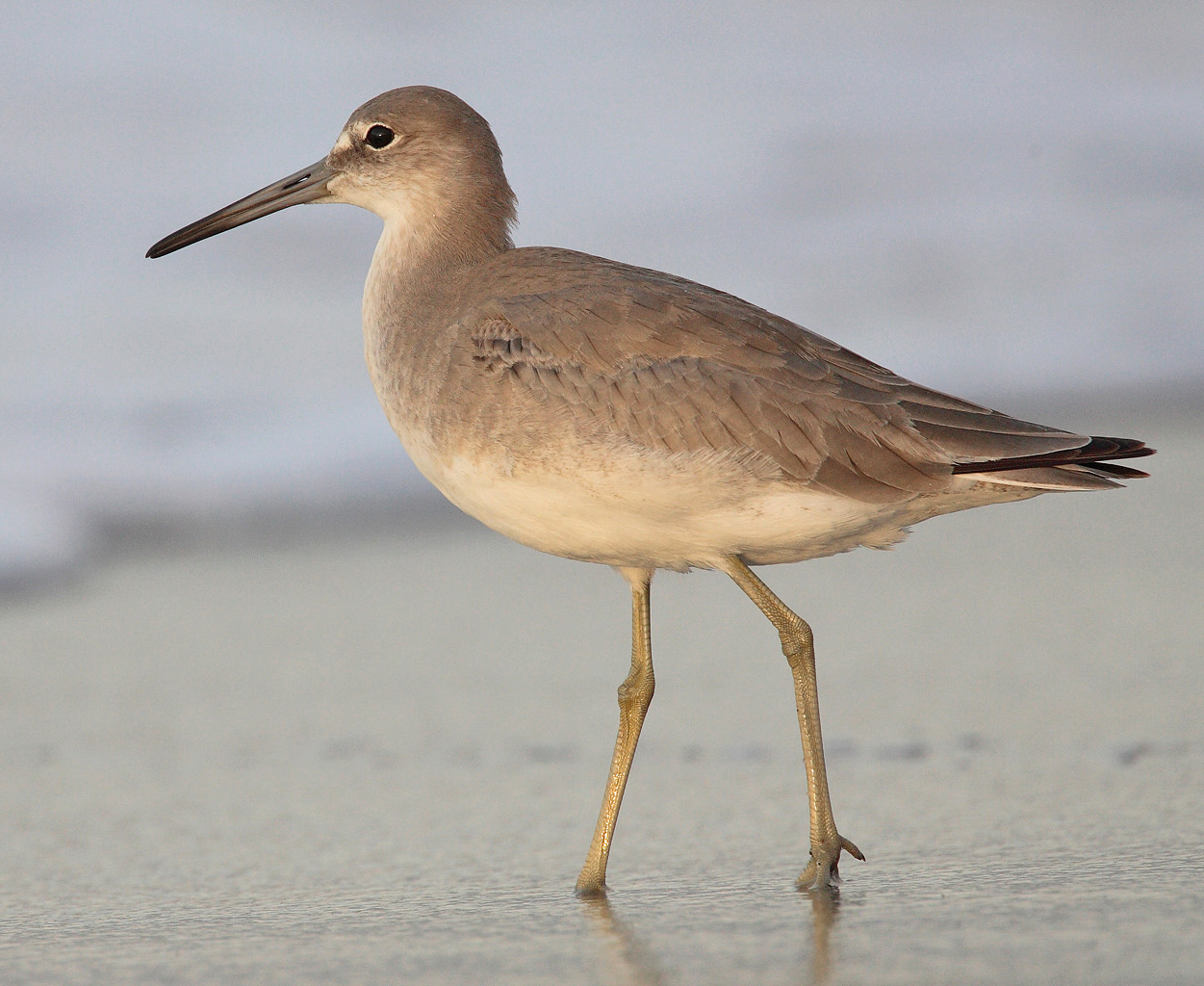
Willet

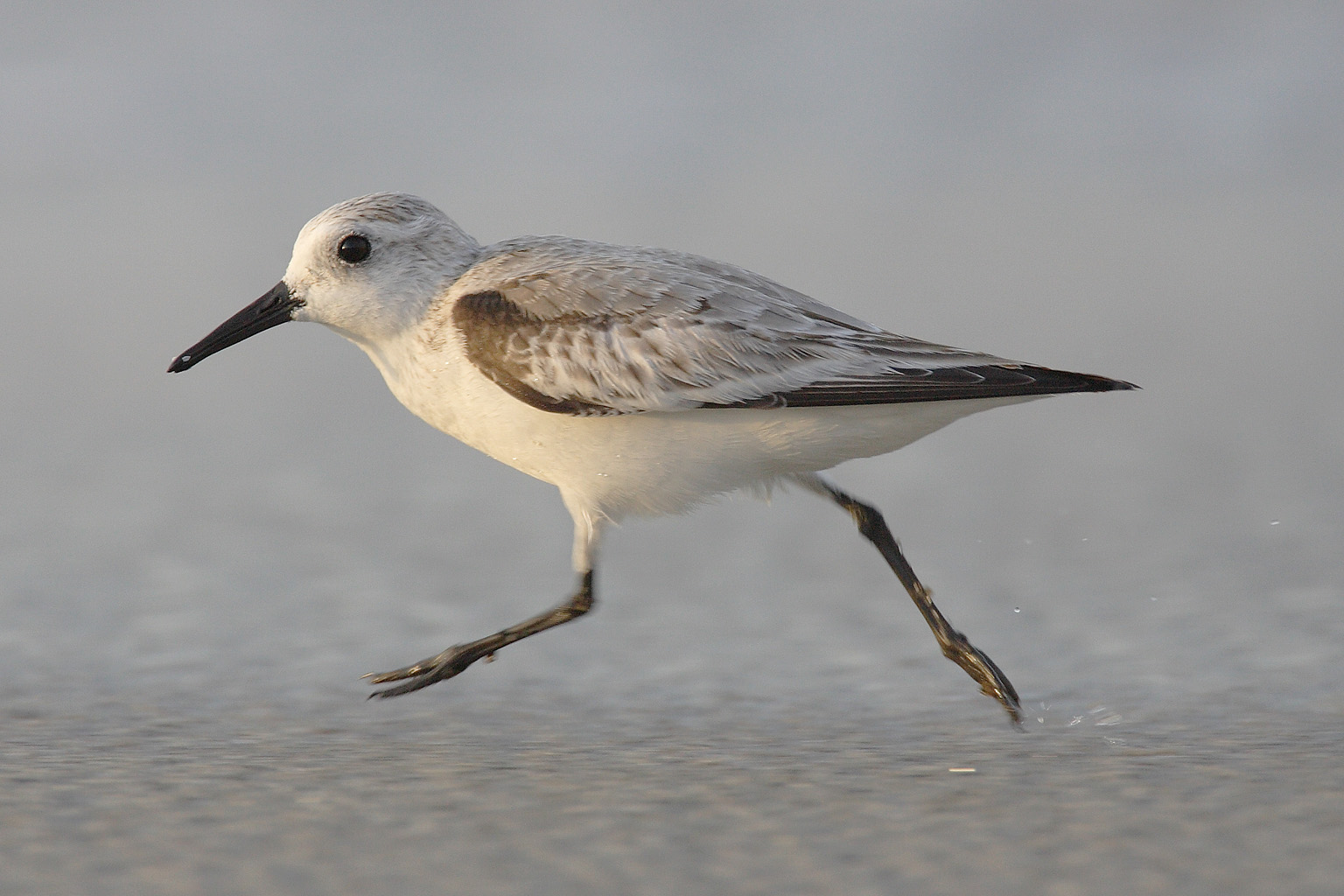
Sanderling

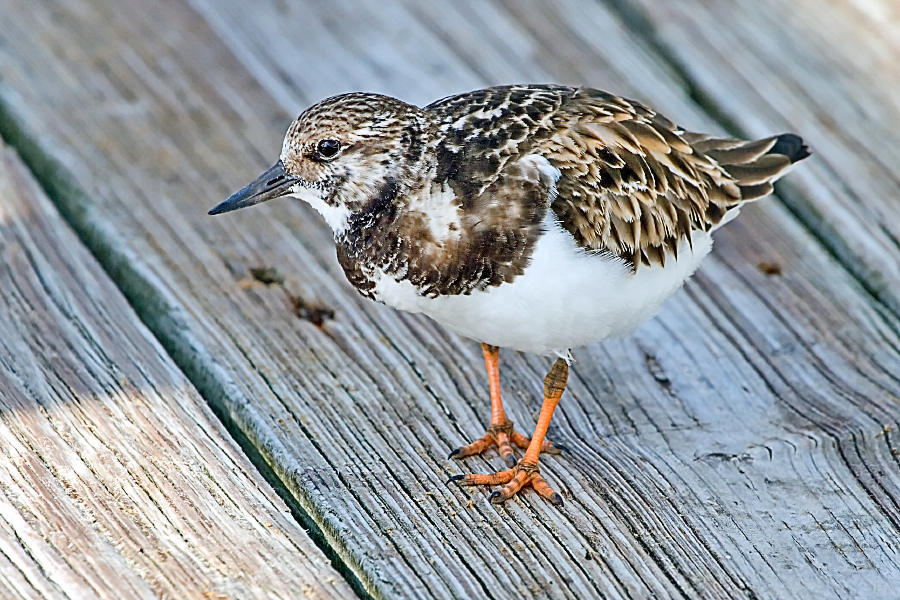
Ruddy turnstone

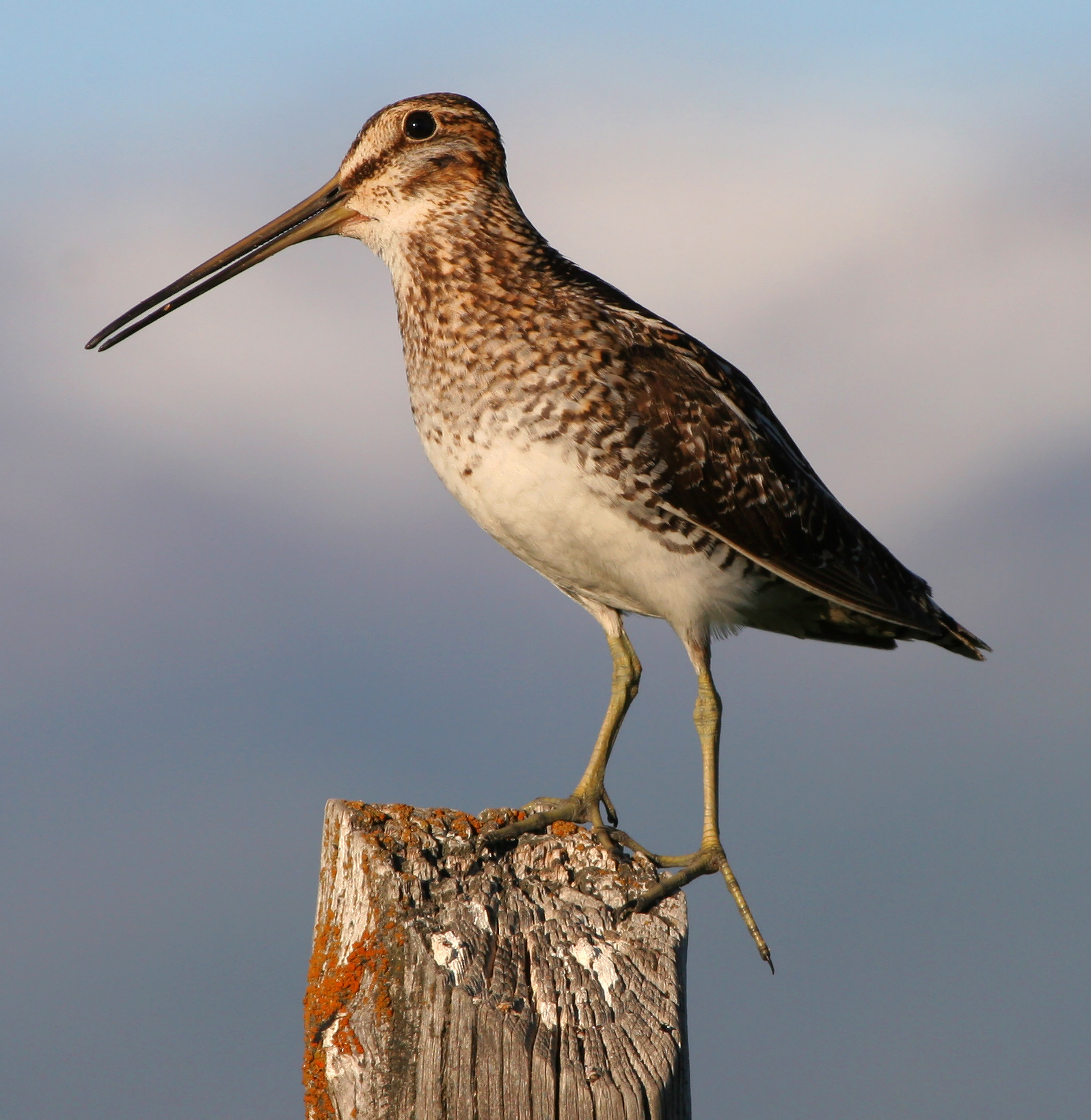
Wilson's snipe

Order: Charadriiformes Family: Scolopacidae

Scolopacidae is a large diverse family of small- to medium-sized shorebirds, including the sandpipers, curlews, godwits, shanks, tattlers, woodcocks, snipes, dowitchers, and phalaropes. The majority of these species eat small invertebrates picked out of the mud or soil. Different lengths of legs and bills enable multiple species to feed in the same habitat, particularly on the coast, without direct competition for food. Thirty-six species have been recorded in Maryland.

- Upland sandpiper, Bartramia longicauda
- Whimbrel, Numenius phaeopus (R*)
- Eskimo curlew, Numenius borealis (R) (X)
- Long-billed curlew, Numenius americanus (R)
- Hudsonian godwit, Limosa haemastica (R*)
- Marbled godwit, Limosa fedoa (R*)
- Ruddy turnstone, Arenaria interpres
- Red knot, Calidris canutus (R*)
- Ruff, Calidris pugnax (R*)
- Sharp-tailed sandpiper, Calidris acuminata (R)
- Stilt sandpiper, Calidris himantopus
- Curlew sandpiper, Calidris ferruginea (R)
- Red-necked stint, Calidris ruficollis (R)
- Sanderling, Calidris alba
- Dunlin, Calidris alpina
- Purple sandpiper, Calidris maritima (R*)
- Baird's sandpiper, Calidris bairdii
- Little stint, Calidris minuta (R)
- Least sandpiper, Calidris minutilla
- White-rumped sandpiper, Calidris fuscicollis
- Buff-breasted sandpiper, Calidris subruficollis
- Pectoral sandpiper, Calidris melanotos
- Semipalmated sandpiper, Calidris pusilla
- Western sandpiper, Calidris mauri
- Short-billed dowitcher, Limnodromus griseus
- Long-billed dowitcher, Limnodromus scolopaceus (R*)
- American woodcock, Scolopax minor
- Wilson's snipe, Gallinago delicata
- Spotted sandpiper, Actitis macularius
- Solitary sandpiper, Tringa solitaria
- Lesser yellowlegs, Tringa flavipes
- Willet, Tringa semipalmata
- Greater yellowlegs, Tringa melanoleuca
- Wilson's phalarope, Phalaropus tricolor
- Red-necked phalarope, Phalaropus lobatus
- Red phalarope, Phalaropus fulicarius (R*)

== Skuas and jaegers ==
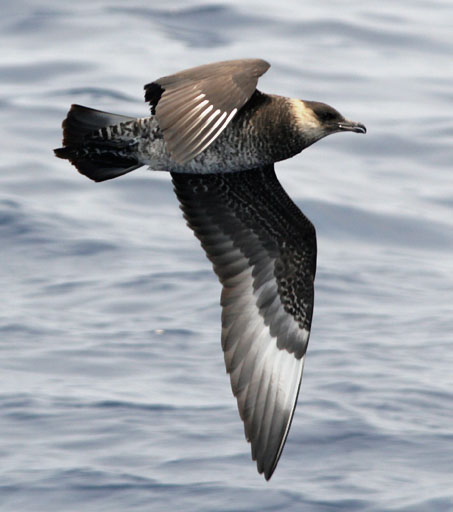
Pomarine jaeger

Order: Charadriiformes Family: Stercorariidae

The skuas and jaegers are in general medium to large birds, typically with gray or brown plumage, often with white markings on the wings. They have longish bills with hooked tips and webbed feet with sharp claws. They look like large dark gulls, but have a fleshy cere above the upper mandible. They are strong, acrobatic fliers. Five species have been recorded in Maryland.

- Great skua, Stercorarius skua (R)
- South polar skua, Stercorarius maccormicki (R)
- Pomarine jaeger, Stercorarius pomarinus (R*)
- Parasitic jaeger, Stercorarius parasiticus (R*)
- Long-tailed jaeger, Stercorarius longicaudus (R)

== Auks, murres, and puffins ==
Order: Charadriiformes Family: Alcidae

Alcids are superficially similar to penguins due to their black-and-white colors, their upright posture, and some of their habits; however, they are only distantly related to the penguins and are able to fly. Auks live on the open sea, only deliberately coming ashore to nest. Six species have been recorded in Maryland.

- Dovekie, Alle alle (R*)
- Common murre, Uria aalge (R*)
- Thick-billed murre, Uria lomvia (R)
- Razorbill, Alca torda (R*)
- Black guillemot, Cepphus columba (R)
- Atlantic puffin, Fratercula arctica (R*)

== Gulls, terns, and skimmers ==
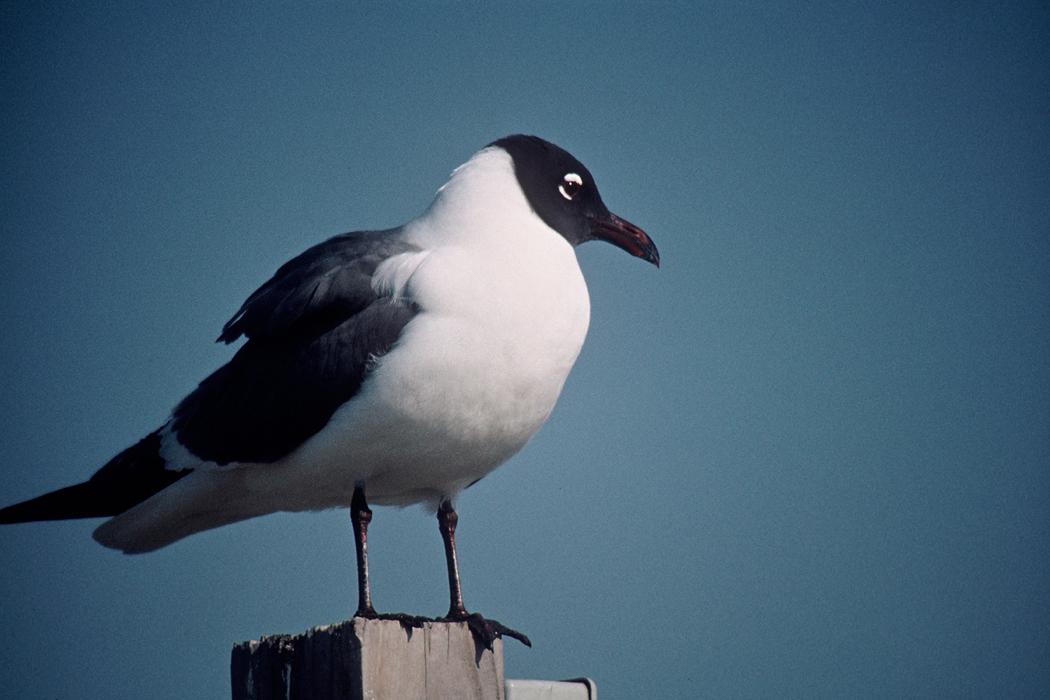
Laughing gull

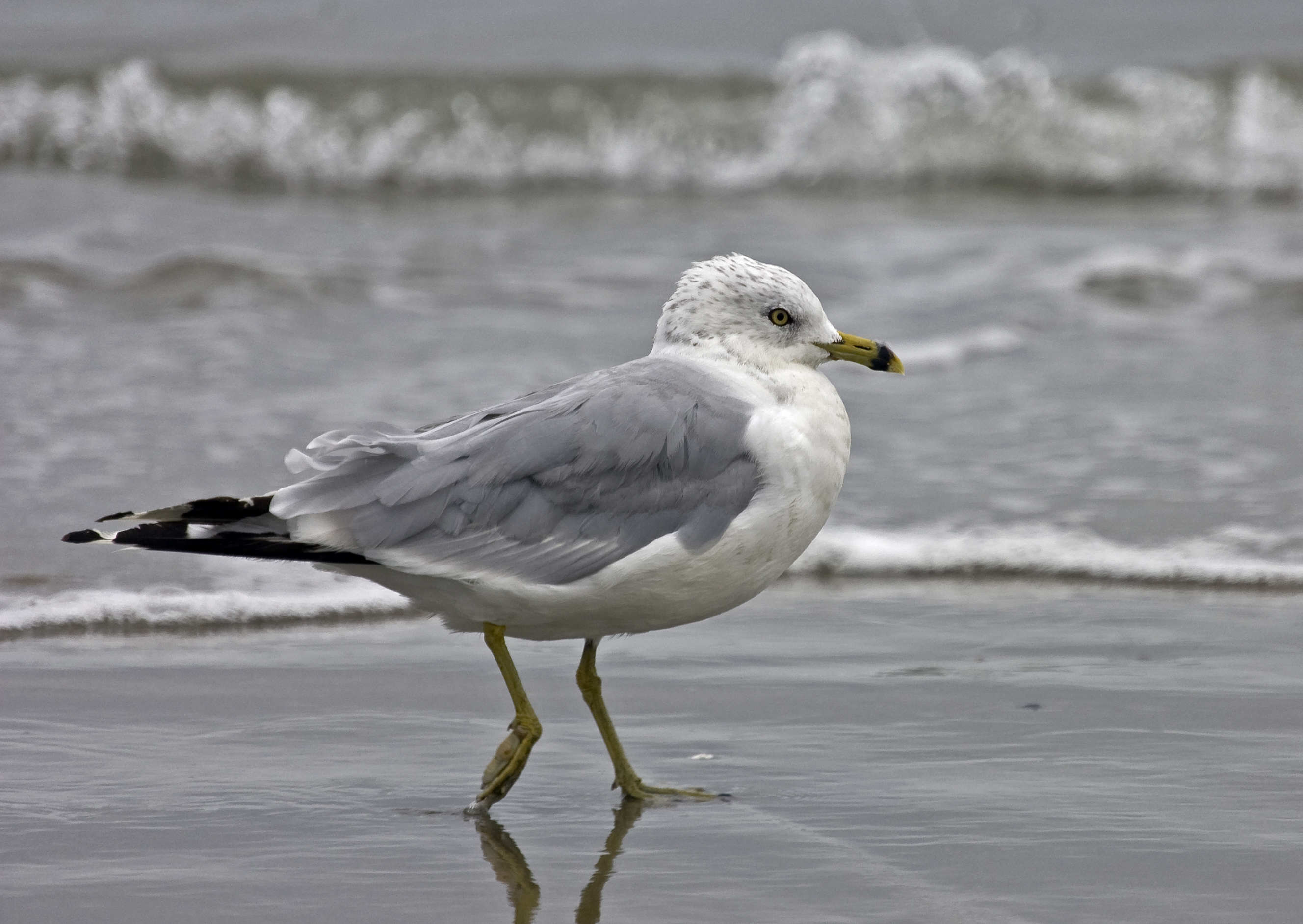
Ring-billed gull

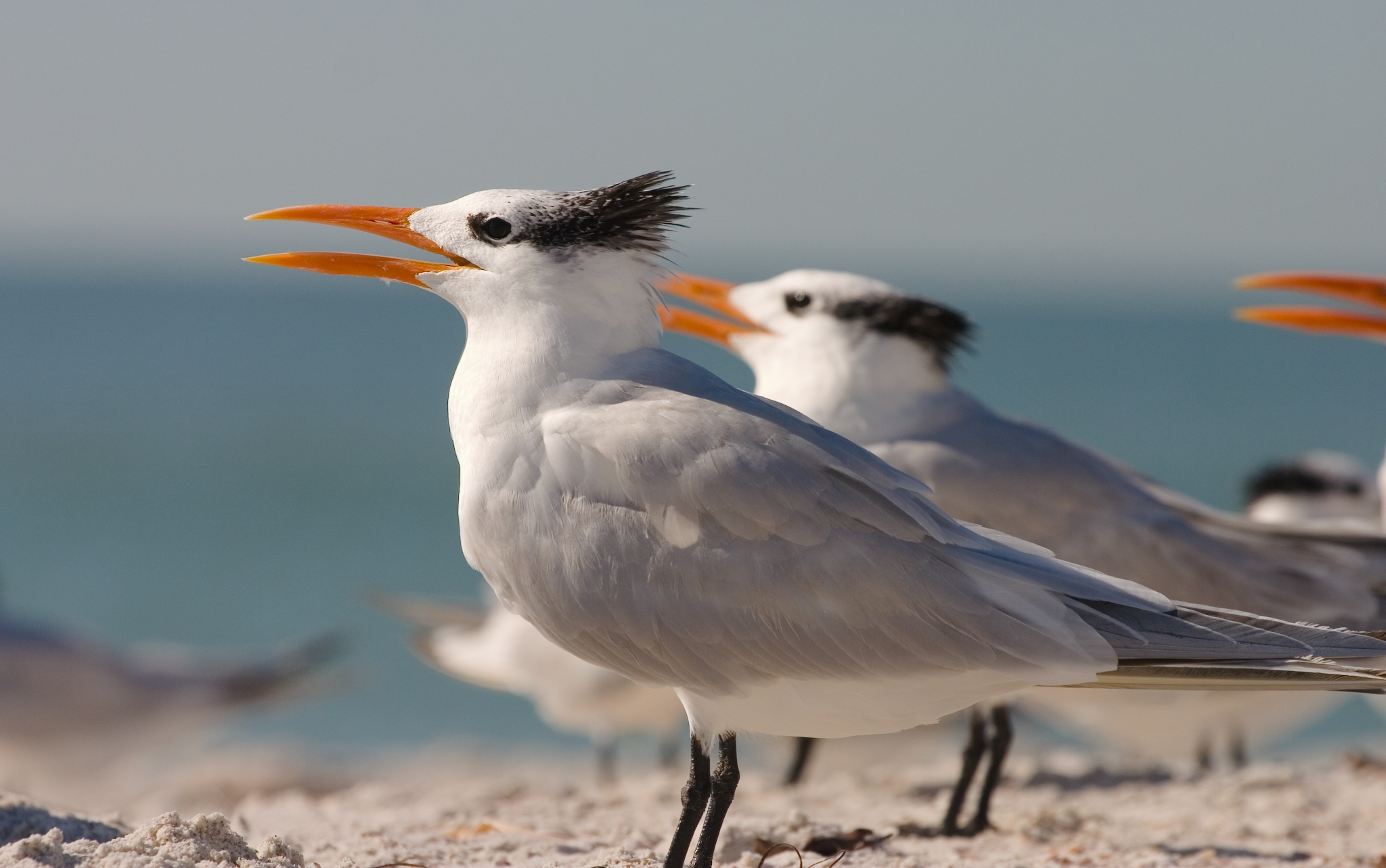
Royal tern

Order: Charadriiformes Family: Laridae

Gulls are typically medium-to-large birds, usually gray or white, often with black markings on the head or wings. They have stout, longish bills and webbed feet. The large species take up to four years to attain full adult plumage, but two years is typical for small gulls. Terns are in general medium-to-large birds, typically with gray or white plumage, often with black markings on the head. They have longish bills and webbed feet. They are lighter bodied and more streamlined than gulls, and look elegant in flight with long tails and long narrow wings. Skimmers are tropical and subtropical species. They have an elongated lower mandible. They feed by flying low over the water surface with the lower mandible skimming the water for small fish. Thirty-two confirmed species of Laridae, and one species of questionable origin, have been recorded in Maryland.

- Black-legged kittiwake, Rissa tridactyla (R*)
- Sabine's gull, Xema sabini (R)
- Bonaparte's gull, Chroicocephalus philadelphia
- Black-headed gull, Chroicocephalus ridibundus (R*)
- Little gull, Hydrocoloeus minutus (R*)
- Silver gull, Chroicocephalus novaehollandiae (QO) (not on the AOS Check-list; scientific name and placement are per Clements)
- Ross's gull, Rhodostethia rosea (R)
- Laughing gull, Leucophaeus atricilla (R*)
- Franklin's gull, Leucophaeus pipixcan (R)
- Black-tailed gull, Larus crassirostris (R)
- Common gull, Larus canus (R)
- Ring-billed gull, Larus delawarensis
- California gull, Larus californicus (R)
- American herring gull, Larus smithsonianus
- European herring gull, Larus argentatus (accidental)
- Yellow-legged gull, Larus michahellis (R)
- Iceland gull, Larus glaucoides (R*)
- Lesser black-backed gull, Larus fuscus
- Glaucous gull, Larus hyperboreus (R*)
- Great black-backed gull, Larus marinus (R*)
- Kelp gull, Larus dominicanus (R)
- Sooty tern, Onychoprion fuscatus (R*)
- Bridled tern, Onychoprion anaethetus (R*)
- Least tern, Sternula antillarum (R*)
- Gull-billed tern, Gelochelidon nilotica (R*)
- Caspian tern, Hydroprogne caspia
- Black tern, Chlidonias niger
- Roseate tern, Sterna dougallii (R)
- Common tern, Sterna hirundo
- Arctic tern, Sterna paradisaea (R)
- Forster's tern, Sterna forsteri
- Royal tern, Thalasseus maximus (R*)
- Sandwich tern, Thalasseus sandvicensis (R*)
- Black skimmer, Rynchops niger (R*)

== Tropicbirds ==
Order: Phaethontiformes Family: Phaethontidae

Tropicbirds are slender white birds of tropical oceans with exceptionally long central tail feathers. Their long wings have black markings, as does the head. Two species have been recorded in Maryland.

- White-tailed tropicbird, Phaethon lepturus (R)
- Red-billed tropicbird, Phaethon aethereus (R)

== Loons ==
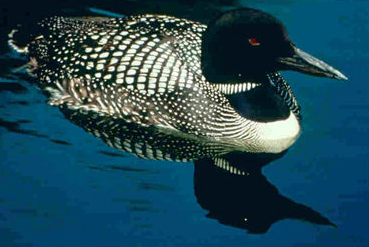
Common loon

Order: Gaviiformes Family: Gaviidae

Loons are aquatic birds that are the size of a large duck, to which they are unrelated. Their plumage is largely gray or black, and they have spear-shaped bills. Loons swim well and fly adequately, but, because their legs are placed towards the rear of the body, are extremely poor at walking. Three species have been recorded in Maryland.

- Red-throated loon, Gavia stellata
- Pacific loon, Gavia pacifica (R)
- Common loon, Gavia immer

== Albatrosses ==
Order: Procellariiformes Family: Diomedeidae

The albatrosses are among the largest of flying birds, and the great albatrosses from the genus Diomedea have the largest wingspans of any extant birds. One species has been recorded in Maryland.

- Yellow-nosed albatross, Thalassarche chlororhynchos (R)

== Southern storm-petrels ==
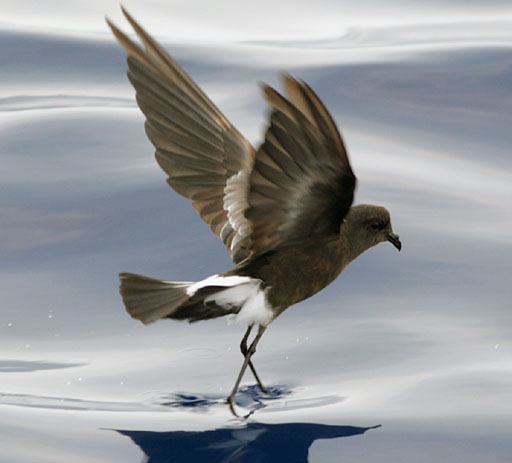
Wilson's storm-petrel

Order: Procellariiformes Family: Oceanitidae

The storm-petrels are the smallest seabirds, relatives of the petrels, feeding on planktonic crustaceans and small fish picked from the surface, typically while hovering. The flight is fluttering and sometimes bat-like. Until 2018, this family's three species were included with the other storm-petrels in family Hydrobatidae. Two species have been recorded in Maryland.

- Wilson's storm-petrel, Oceanites oceanicus (R*)
- White-faced storm-petrel, Pelagodroma marina (R)

== Northern storm-petrels ==
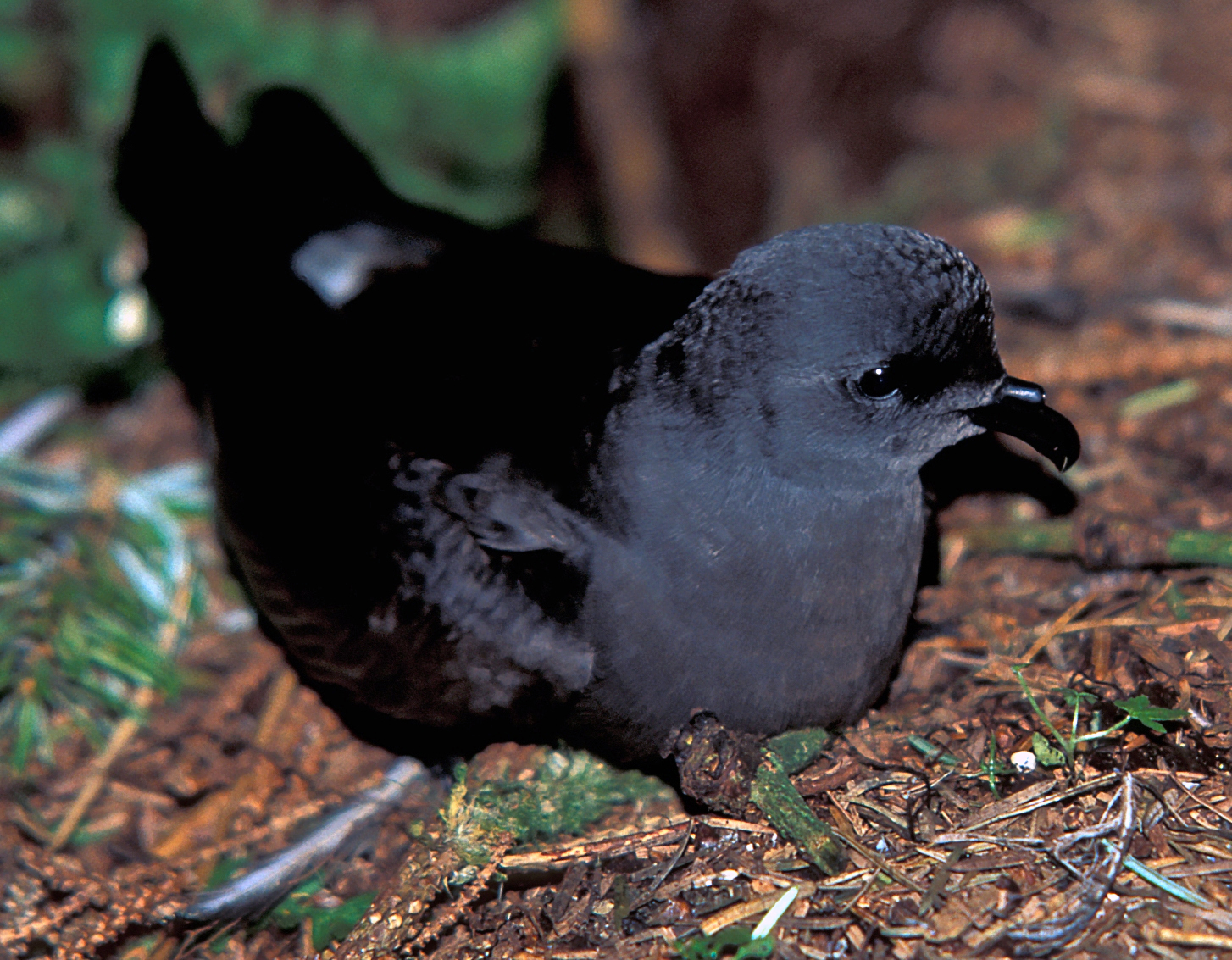
Leach's storm-petrel

Order: Procellariiformes Family: Hydrobatidae

Though the members of this family are similar in many respects to the southern storm-petrels, including their general appearance and habits, there are enough genetic differences to warrant their placement in a separate family. Two species have been recorded in Maryland.

- Leach's storm-petrel, Hydrobates leucorhous (R*)
- Band-rumped storm-petrel, Hydrobates castro (R)

== Shearwaters and petrels ==
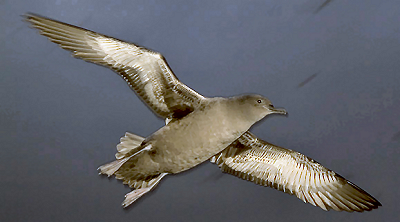
Sooty shearwater

Order: Procellariiformes Family: Procellariidae

The procellariids are the main group of medium-sized "true petrels", characterized by united nostrils with medium septum and a long outer functional primary. Eight species and a species pair have been recorded in Maryland.

- Northern fulmar, Fulmarus glacialis (R*)
- Trindade petrel, Pterodroma arminjoniana (R)
- Black-capped petrel, Pterodroma hasitata (R)
- Zino's petrel/Fea's petrel, Pterodroma madeira/Pterodroma feae (R)
- Cory's shearwater, Calonectris diomedea (R*)
- Sooty shearwater, Ardenna griseus (R*)
- Great shearwater, Ardenna gravis (R*)
- Manx shearwater, Puffinus puffinus (R*)
- Sargasso shearwater, Puffinus lherminieri (R*)

== Storks ==
Order: Ciconiiformes Family: Ciconiidae

Storks are large, heavy, long-legged, long-necked wading birds with long stout bills and wide wingspans. They lack the powder down that other wading birds such as herons, spoonbills and ibises use to clean off fish slime. Storks lack a pharynx and are mute. One species has been recorded in Maryland.

- Wood stork, Mycteria americana (R)

== Frigatebirds ==
Order: Suliformes Family: Fregatidae

Frigatebirds are large seabirds usually found over tropical oceans. They are large, black, or black-and-white, with long wings and deeply forked tails. The males have colored inflatable throat pouches. They do not swim or walk and cannot take off from a flat surface. Having the largest wingspan-to-body-weight ratio of any bird, they are essentially aerial, able to stay aloft for more than a week. One species has been recorded in Maryland.

- Magnificent frigatebird, Fregata magnificens (R)

== Boobies and gannets ==
Order: Suliformes Family: Sulidae

The sulids comprise the gannets and boobies. Both groups are medium-large coastal seabirds that plunge-dive for fish. Three species have been recorded in Maryland.

- Masked booby, Sula dactylatra (R)
- Brown booby, Sula leucogaster (R)
- Northern gannet, Morus bassanus (R*)

== Anhingas ==
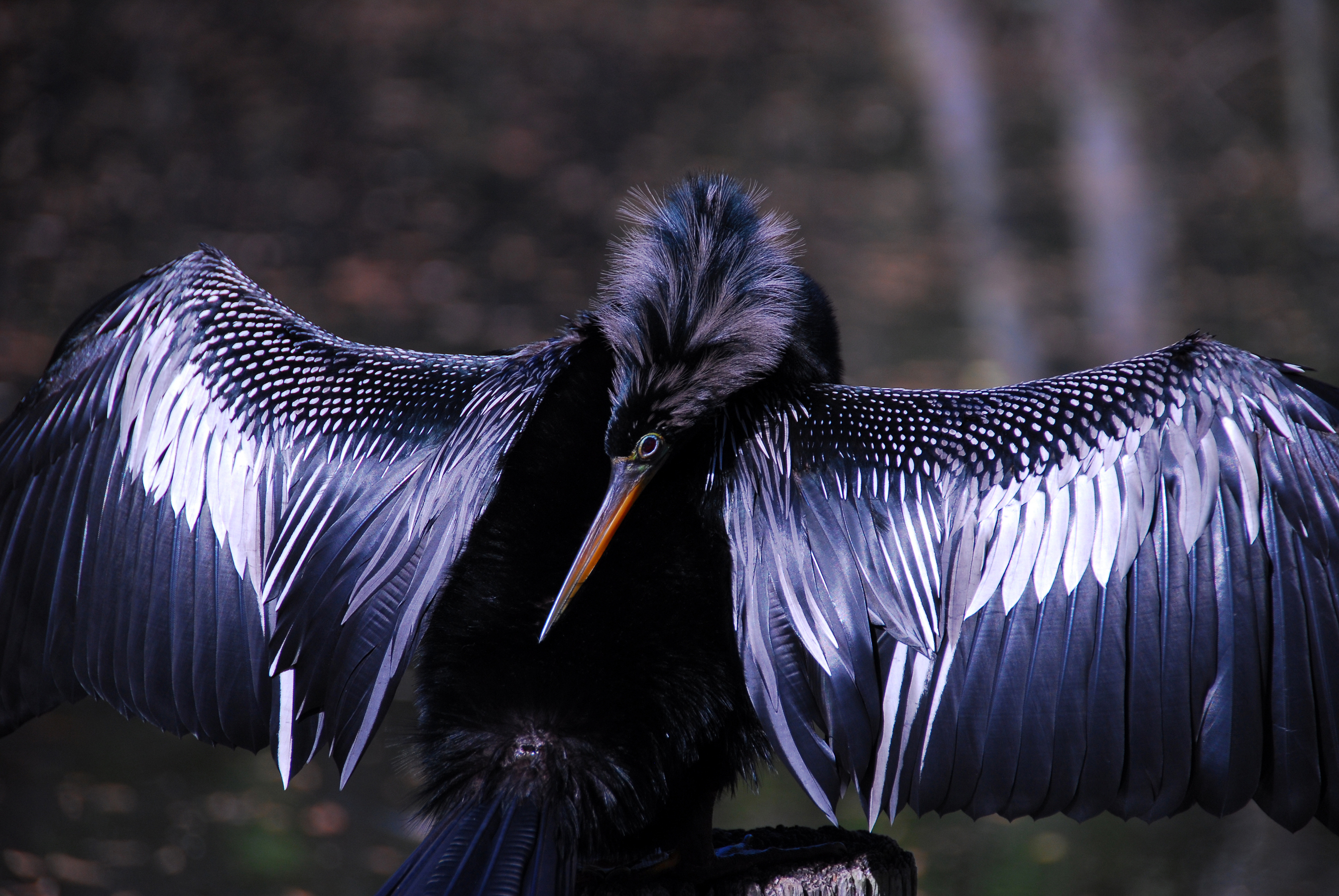
Anhinga

Order: Suliformes Family: Anhingidae

Darters and anhingas are cormorant-like water birds with long necks and long, straight beaks. They are fish eaters which often swim with only their neck above the water. One species has been recorded in Maryland.

- Anhinga, Anhinga anhinga

== Cormorants and shags ==
Order: Suliformes Family: Phalacrocoracidae

Cormorants are medium-to-large aquatic birds, usually with mainly dark plumage and areas of colored skin on the face. The bill is long, thin, and sharply hooked. Their feet are four-toed and webbed. Three species have been recorded in Maryland.

- Great cormorant, Phalacrocorax carbo (R*)
- Double-crested cormorant, Nannopterum auritum
- Neotropic cormorant, Nannopterum brasilianum (R)

== Pelicans ==
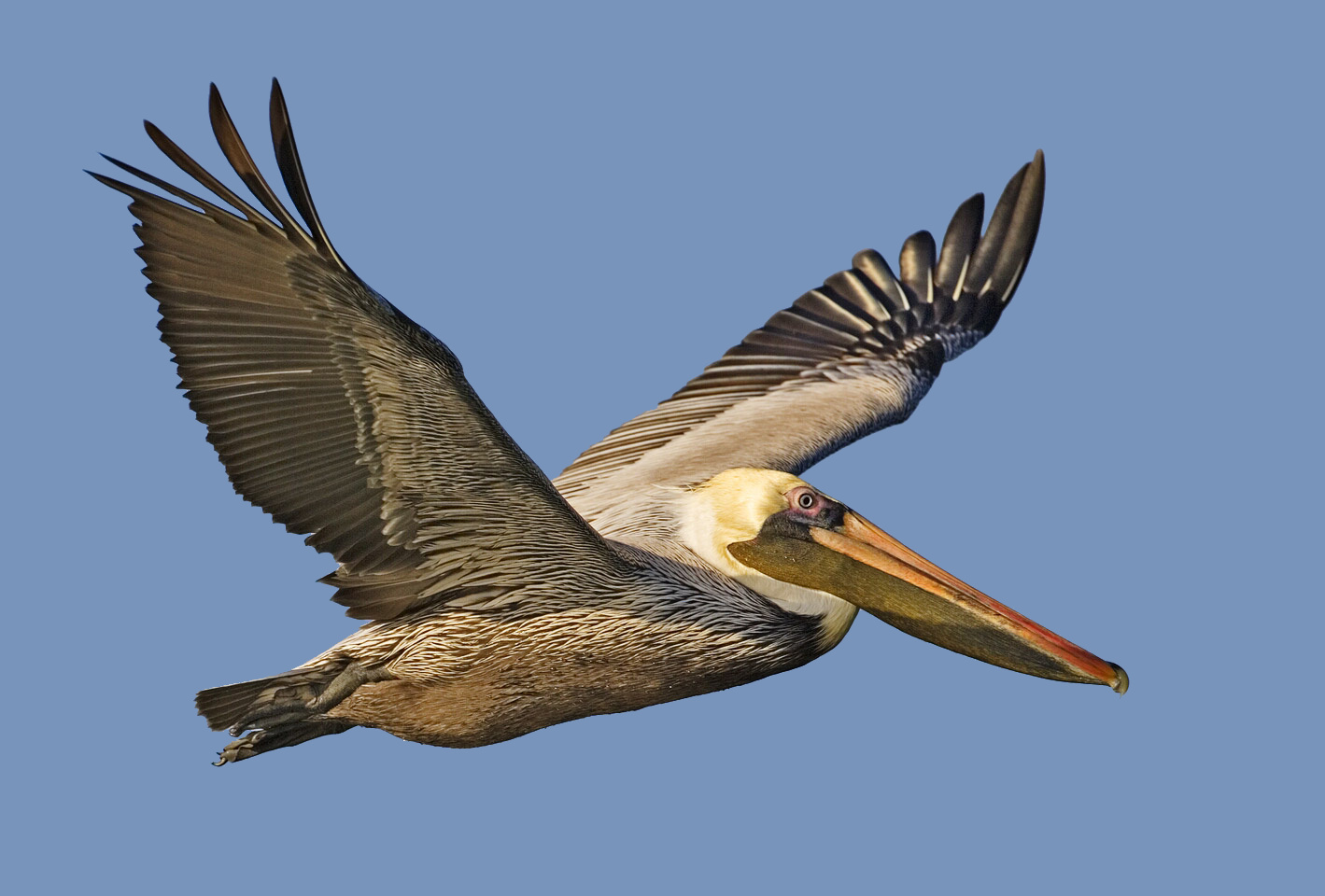
Brown pelican

Order: Pelecaniformes Family: Pelecanidae

Pelicans are large water birds with a distinctive pouch under their beak. Like other birds in the order Pelecaniformes, they have four webbed toes. Two species have been recorded in Maryland.

- American white pelican, Pelecanus erythrorhynchos
- Brown pelican, Pelecanus occidentalis (R*)

== Herons, egrets, and bitterns ==
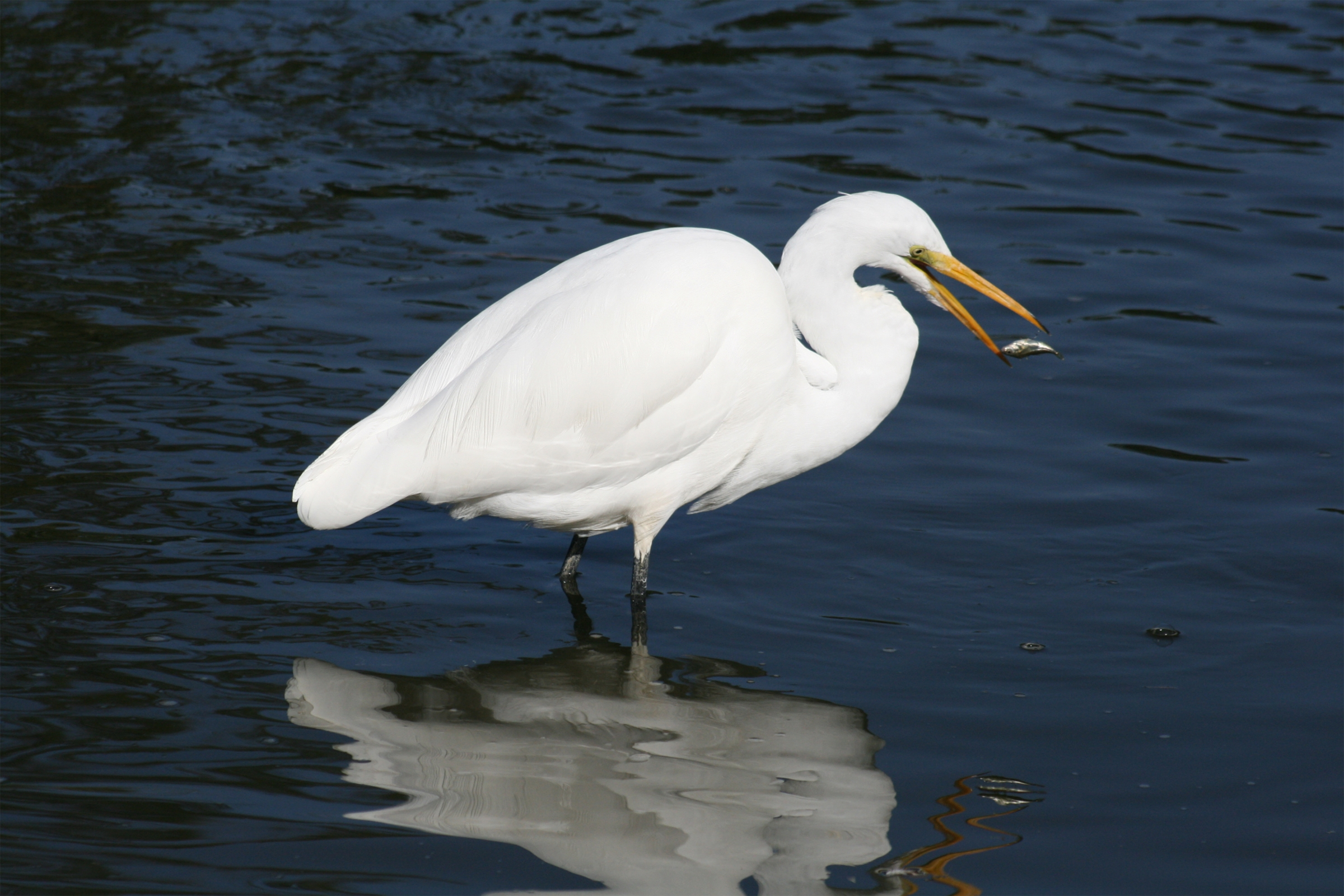
Great egret

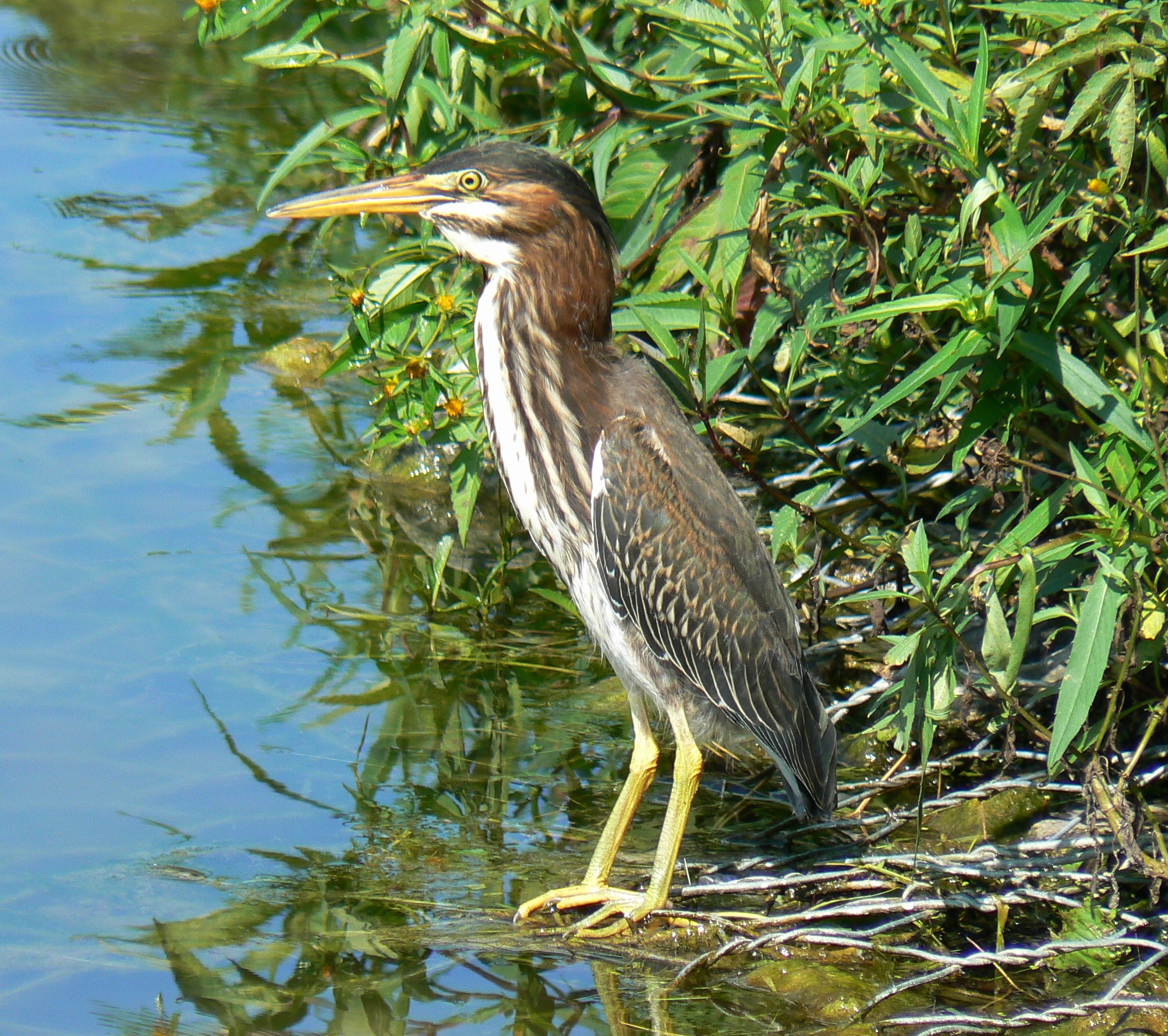
Green heron

Order: Pelecaniformes Family: Ardeidae

The family Ardeidae contains the herons, egrets, and bitterns. Herons and egrets are medium to large wading birds with long necks and legs. Bitterns tend to be shorter-necked and more secretive. Members of Ardeidae fly with their necks retracted, unlike other long-necked birds such as storks, ibises, and spoonbills. Thirteen species have been recorded in Maryland.

- American bittern, Botaurus lentiginosus
- Least bittern, Ixobrychus exilis
- Great blue heron, Ardea herodias
- Great egret, Ardea alba
- Snowy egret, Egretta thula
- Little egret, Egretta garzetta (R)
- Little blue heron, Egretta caerulea
- Tricolored heron, Egretta tricolor (R*)
- Reddish egret, Egretta rufescens (R)
- Cattle egret, Bubulcus ibis
- Green heron, Butorides virescens
- Black-crowned night-heron, Nycticorax nycticorax
- Yellow-crowned night-heron, Nyctanassa violacea

== Ibises and spoonbills ==
Order: Pelecaniformes Family: Threskiornithidae

The family Threskiornithidae includes the ibises and spoonbills. They have long, broad wings. Their bodies tend to be elongated, the neck more so, with rather long legs. The bill is also long, decurved in the case of the ibises, straight and distinctively flattened in the spoonbills. Four species have been recorded in Maryland.

- White ibis, Eudocimus albus
- Glossy ibis, Plegadis falcinellus
- White-faced ibis, Plegadis chihi (R*)
- Roseate spoonbill, Platalea ajaja (R)

== New World vultures ==
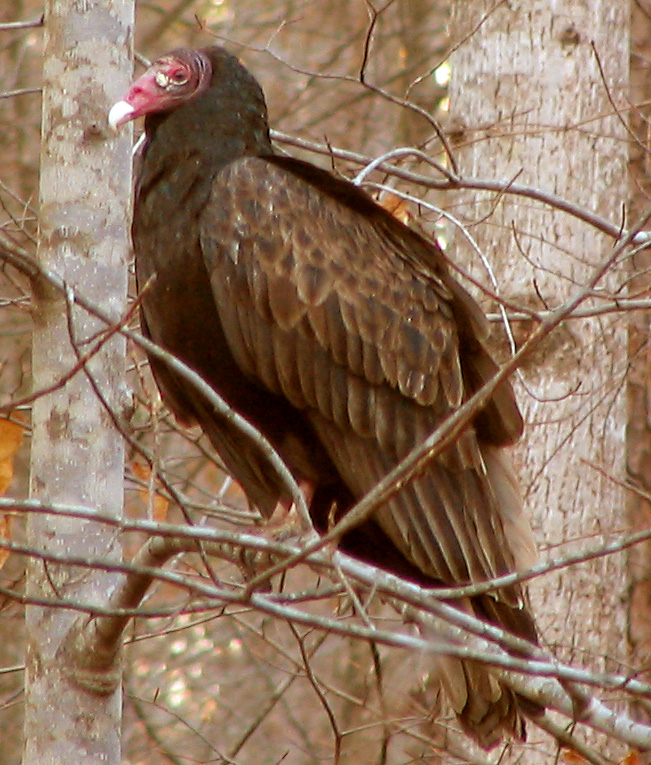
Turkey vulture

Order: Cathartiformes Family: Cathartidae

The New World vultures are not closely related to Old World vultures, but superficially resemble them because of convergent evolution. Like the Old World vultures, they are scavengers. However, unlike Old World vultures, which find carcasses by sight, New World vultures have a good sense of smell with which they locate carcasses. Two species have been recorded in Maryland.

- Black vulture, Coragyps atratus
- Turkey vulture, Cathartes aura

== Osprey ==
Order: Accipitriformes Family: Pandionidae

The Osprey is a medium-large fish-eating bird of prey or raptor. It is widely distributed because it tolerates a wide variety of habitats, nesting in any location that is near a body of water and provides an adequate food supply. It is the only member of its family.

- Osprey, Pandion haliaetus

== Hawks, eagles, and kites ==
Red-tailed hawks at nest

Order: Accipitriformes Family: Accipitridae

Accipitridae is a family of birds of prey which includes hawks, eagles, kites, harriers, and Old World vultures. These birds have large powerful hooked beaks for tearing flesh from their prey, strong legs, powerful talons, and keen eyesight. Fifteen species have been recorded in Maryland.

- White-tailed kite, Elanus leucurus (R)
- Swallow-tailed kite, Elanoides forficatus
- Golden eagle, Aquila chrysaetos
- Northern harrier, Circus hudsonius
- Sharp-shinned hawk, Accipiter striatus
- Cooper's hawk, Accipiter cooperii
- American goshawk, Accipiter atricapillus (R)
- Bald eagle, Haliaeetus leucocephalus
- Mississippi kite, Ictinia mississippiensis
- Red-shouldered hawk, Buteo lineatus
- Broad-winged hawk, Buteo platypterus
- Swainson's hawk, Buteo swainsoni (R)
- Red-tailed hawk, Buteo jamaicensis
- Rough-legged hawk, Buteo lagopus
- Zone-tailed hawk, Buteo albonotatus (R)

== Barn-owls ==
Order: Strigiformes Family: Tytonidae

Barn-owls are medium to large owls with large heads and characteristic heart-shaped faces. They have long strong legs with powerful talons. One species has been recorded in Maryland.

- American barn owl, Tyto furcata

== Owls ==
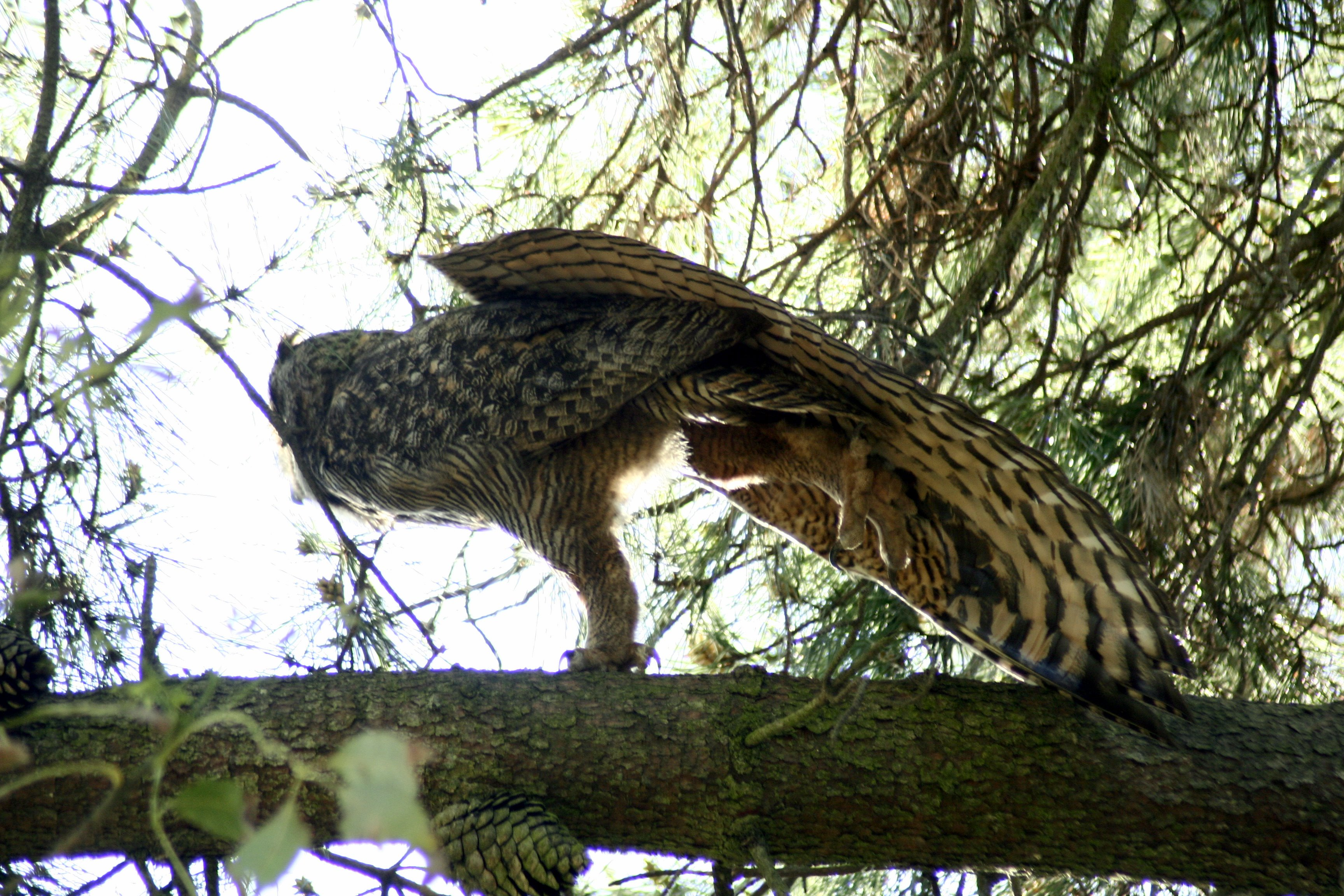
Great horned owl

Order: Strigiformes Family: Strigidae

The typical owls are small-to-large solitary nocturnal birds of prey. They have large forward-facing eyes and ears, a hawk-like beak, and a conspicuous circle of feathers around each eye called a facial disk. Eight species have been recorded in Maryland.

- Eastern screech-owl, Megascops asio
- Great horned owl, Bubo virginianus
- Snowy owl, Bubo scandiacus
- Burrowing owl, Athene cunicularia (R)
- Barred owl, Strix varia
- Long-eared owl, Asio otus
- Short-eared owl, Asio flammeus
- Northern saw-whet owl, Aegolius acadicus

== Kingfishers ==
Order: Coraciiformes Family: Alcedinidae

Kingfishers are medium-sized birds with large heads, long, pointed bills, short legs, and stubby tails. One species has been recorded in Maryland.

- Belted kingfisher, Megaceryle alcyon

== Woodpeckers ==
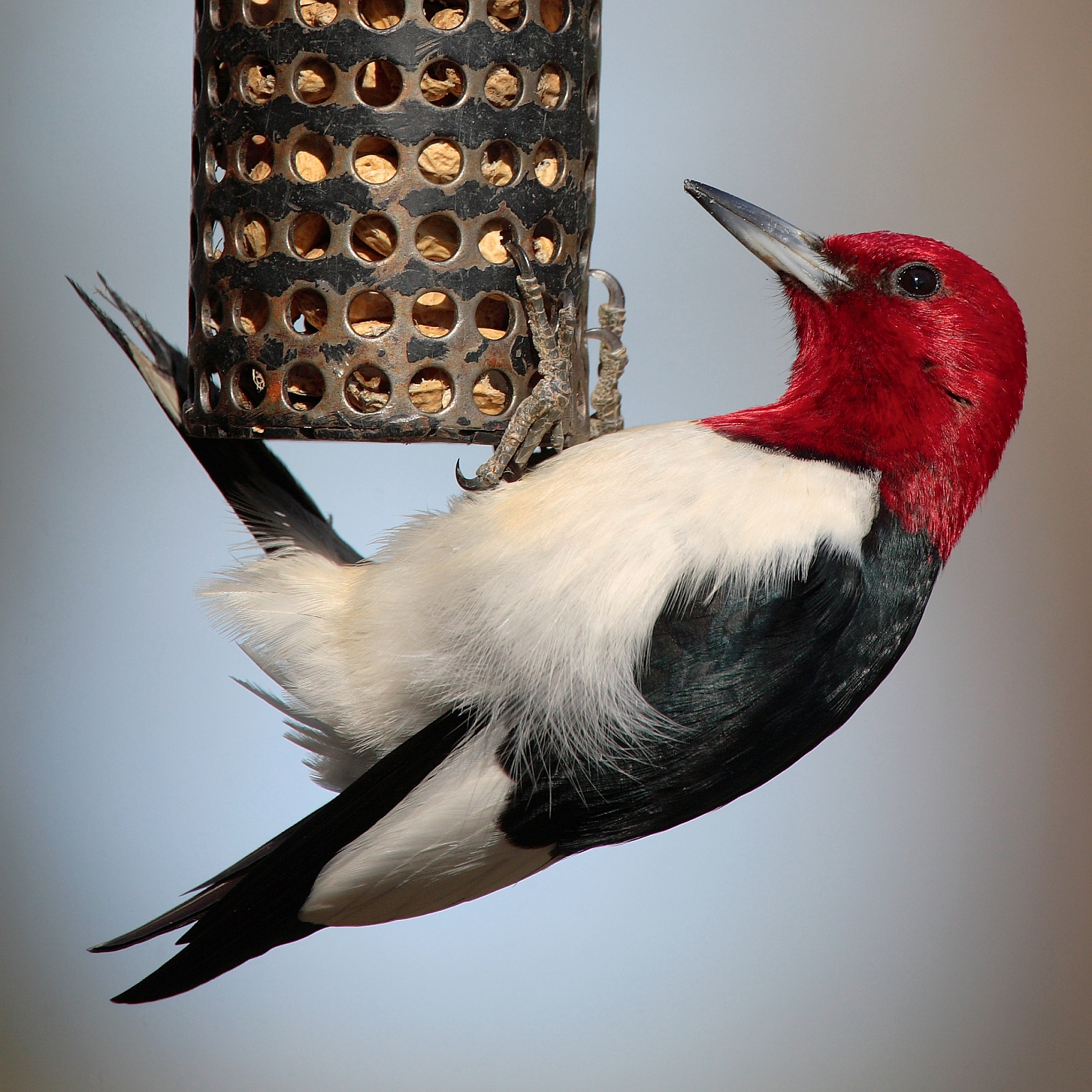
Red-headed woodpecker

Order: Piciformes Family: Picidae

Woodpeckers are small- to medium-sized birds with chisel-like beaks, short legs, stiff tails, and long tongues used for capturing insects. Some species have feet with two toes pointing forward and two backward, while several species have only three toes. Many woodpeckers have the habit of tapping noisily on tree trunks with their beaks. Eight species have been recorded in Maryland.

- Red-headed woodpecker, Melanerpes erythrocephalus
- Red-bellied woodpecker, Melanerpes carolinus
- Yellow-bellied sapsucker, Sphyrapicus varius
- Downy woodpecker, Dryobates pubescens
- Red-cockaded woodpecker, Dryobates borealis (R)
- Hairy woodpecker, Dryobates villosus
- Northern flicker, Colaptes auratus
- Pileated woodpecker, Dryocopus pileatus

== Falcons and caracaras ==
Order: Falconiformes Family: Falconidae

Falconidae is a family of diurnal birds of prey, notably the falcons and caracaras. They differ from hawks, eagles, and kites in that they kill with their beaks instead of their talons. Five species have been recorded in Maryland.

- Crested caracara, Caracara plancus (R)
- American kestrel, Falco sparverius
- Merlin, Falco columbarius
- Gyrfalcon, Falco rusticolus (R)
- Peregrine falcon, Falco peregrinus

== New World and African parrots ==
Order: Psittaciformes Family: Psittacidae

Parrots are small-to-large birds with a characteristic curved beak. Their upper mandibles have slight mobility in the joint with the skull and they have a generally erect stance. All parrots are zygodactyl, having the four toes on each foot placed two at the front and two to the back. Most of the more than 150 species in this family are found in the New World. Two species have been recorded in Maryland.

- Carolina parakeet, Conuropsis carolinensis (Xt)
- Monk parakeet, Myiopsitta monachus (QO)

== Tyrant flycatchers ==
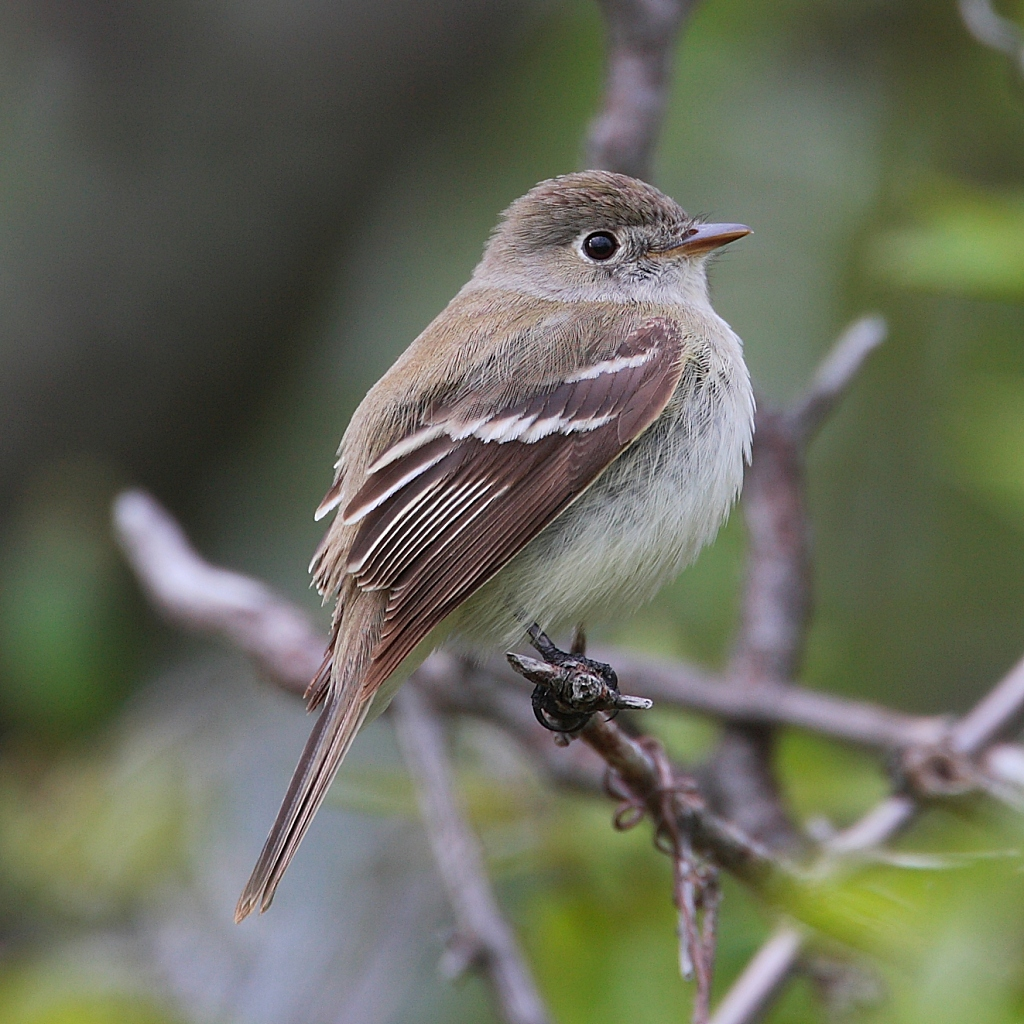
Least flycatcher

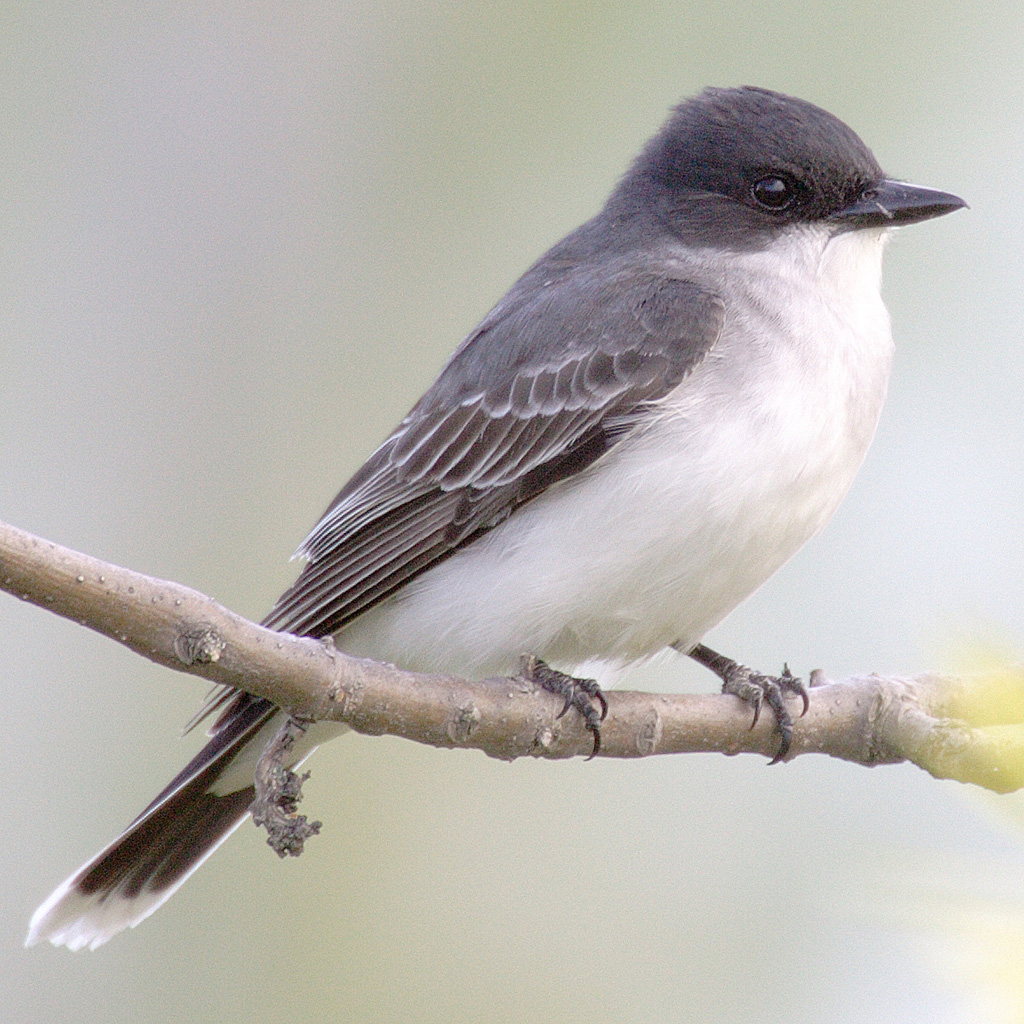
Eastern kingbird

Order: Passeriformes Family: Tyrannidae

Tyrant flycatchers are passerine birds which occur throughout North and South America. They superficially resemble the Old World flycatchers, but are more robust and have stronger bills. They do not have the sophisticated vocal capabilities of the songbirds. Most, but not all, are rather plain in plumage. As the name implies, most are insectivorous. Twenty-two species and a species pair have been recorded in Maryland.

- Ash-throated flycatcher, Myiarchus cinerascens (R)
- Great crested flycatcher, Myiarchus crinitus
- Great kiskadee, Pitangus sulphuratus (accidental)
- Tropical kingbird, Tyrannus melancholicus (R)
- Couch's kingbird, Tyrannus couchii (R)
- Western kingbird, Tyrannus verticalis
- Eastern kingbird, Tyrannus tyrannus
- Gray kingbird, Tyrannus dominicensis (R)
- Scissor-tailed flycatcher, Tyrannus forficatus (R)
- Fork-tailed flycatcher, Tyrannus savana (R)
- Olive-sided flycatcher, Contopus cooperi
- Eastern wood-pewee, Contopus virens
- Yellow-bellied flycatcher, Empidonax flaviventris
- Acadian flycatcher, Empidonax virescens
- Alder flycatcher, Empidonax alnorum
- Willow flycatcher, Empidonax traillii
- Least flycatcher, Empidonax minimus
- Hammond's flycatcher, Empidonax hammondii (R)
- Western flycatcher, Empidonax difficilis (R)
- Eastern phoebe, Sayornis phoebe
- Say's phoebe, Sayornis saya (R)
- Vermilion flycatcher, Pyrocephalus rubinus (R)

== Vireos, shrike-babblers, and erpornis ==
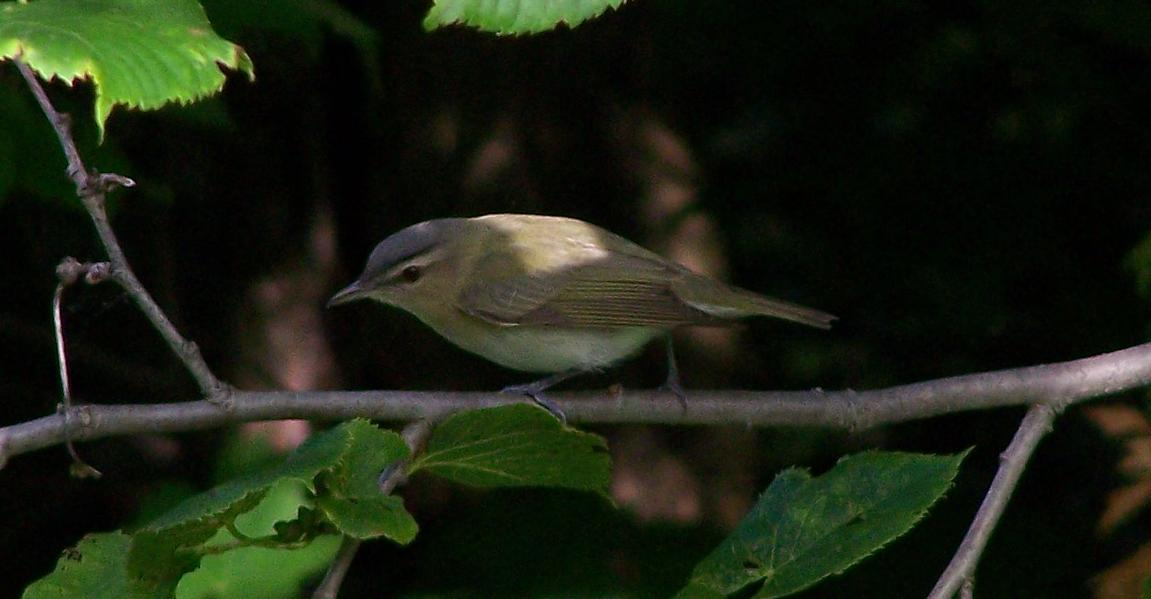
Red-eyed vireo

Order: Passeriformes Family: Vireonidae

The vireos are a group of small- to medium-sized passerine birds. They are typically greenish in color and resemble the wood-warblers, except for their heavier bills. Seven species have been recorded in Maryland.

- White-eyed vireo, Vireo griseus
- Bell's vireo, Vireo bellii (R)
- Yellow-throated vireo, Vireo flavifrons
- Blue-headed vireo, Vireo solitarius
- Philadelphia vireo, Vireo philadelphicus
- Warbling vireo, Vireo gilvus
- Red-eyed vireo, Vireo olivaceus

== Shrikes ==
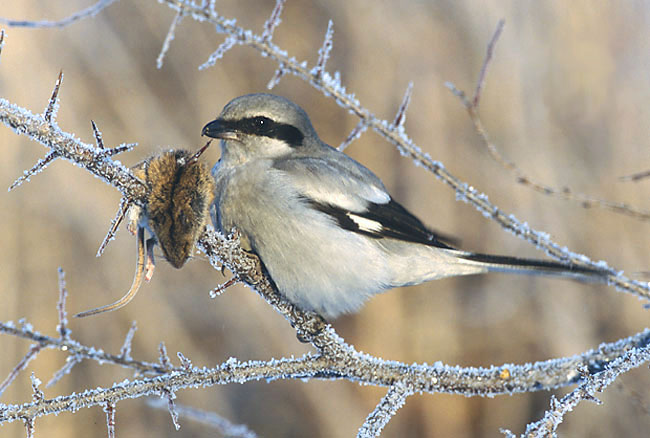
Northern shrike

Order: Passeriformes Family: Laniidae

Shrikes are passerine birds known for their habit of catching other birds and small animals and impaling the uneaten portions of their bodies on thorns. A shrike's beak is hooked, like that of a typical bird of prey. Two species have been recorded in Maryland.

- Loggerhead shrike, Lanius ludovicianus (R)
- Northern shrike, Lanius borealis

== Crows, jays, and magpies ==
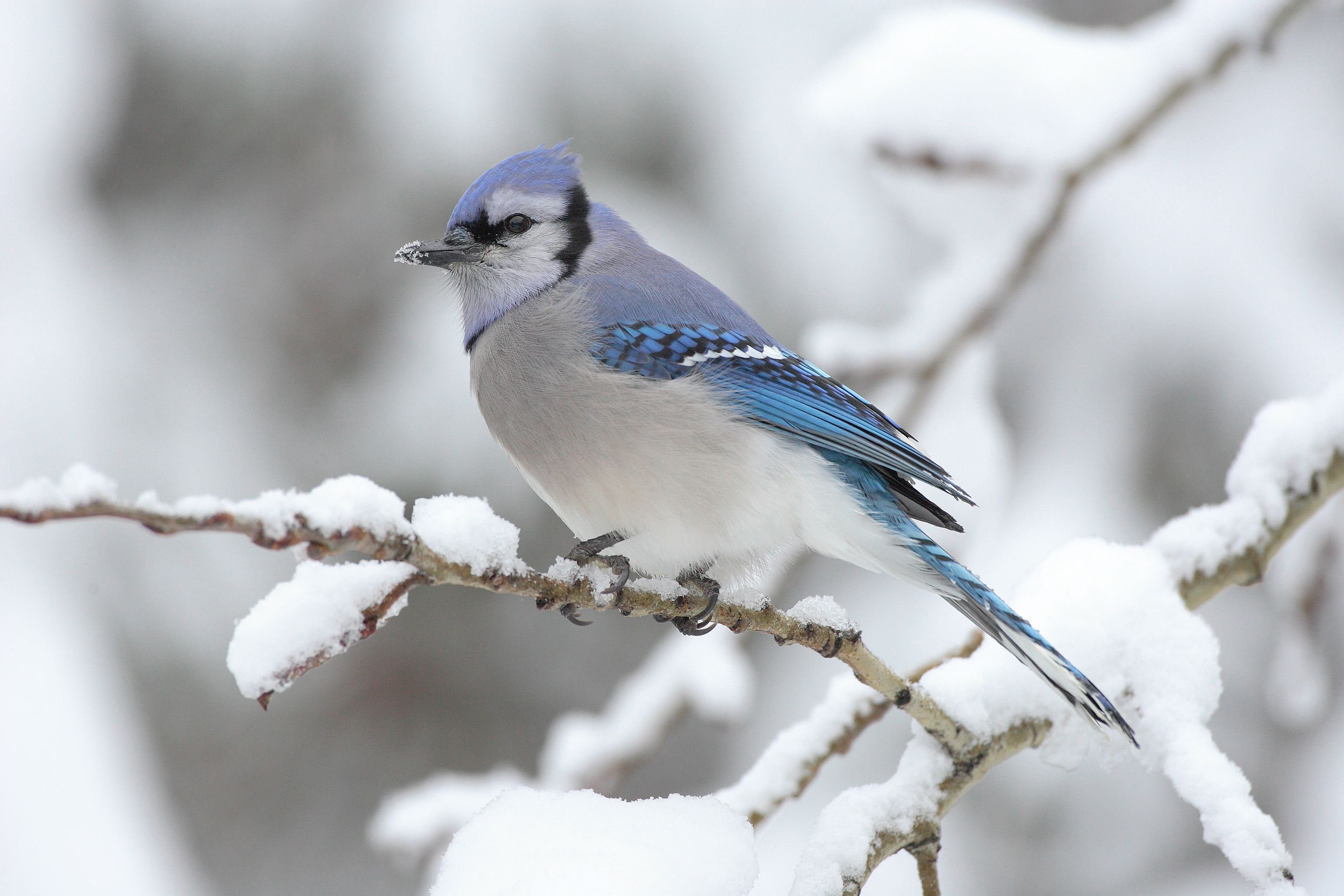
Blue jay

Order: Passeriformes Family: Corvidae

The family Corvidae includes crows, ravens, jays, choughs, magpies, treepies, nutcrackers, and ground jays. Corvids are above average in size among the Passeriformes, and some of the larger species show high levels of intelligence. Four species have been recorded in Maryland.

- Blue jay, Cyanocitta cristata
- American crow, Corvus brachyrhynchos
- Fish crow, Corvus ossifragus
- Common raven, Corvus corax (R*)

== Tits, chickadees, and titmice ==
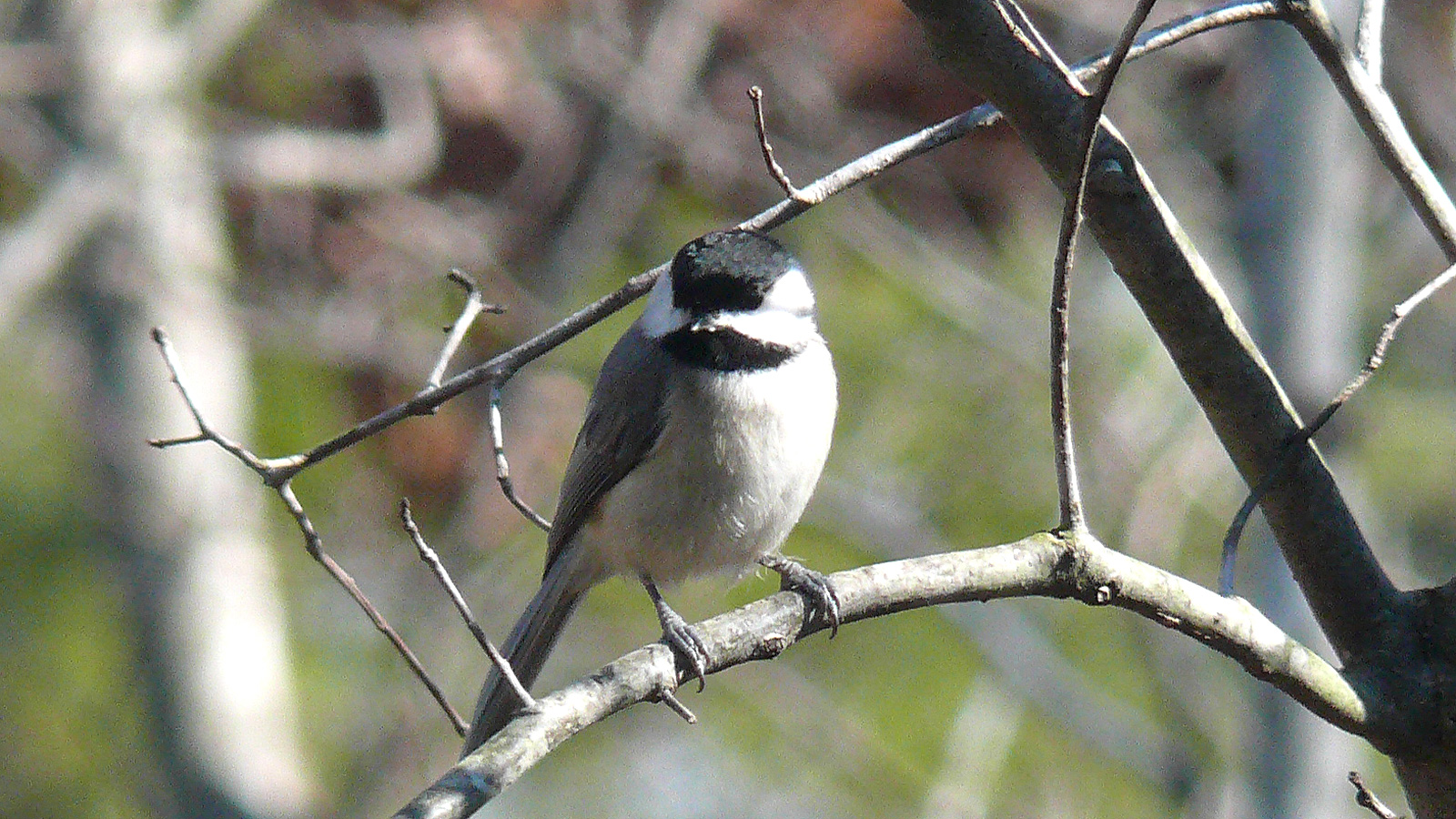
Carolina chickadee

Order: Passeriformes Family: Paridae

The Paridae are mainly small stocky woodland species with short stout bills. Some have crests. They are adaptable birds, with a mixed diet which includes seeds and insects. Five species have been recorded in Maryland.

- Carolina chickadee, Poecile carolinensis (R*)
- Black-capped chickadee, Poecile atricapilla (R*)
- Boreal chickadee, Poecile hudsonica (R)
- Tufted titmouse, Baeolophus bicolor
- Great tit, Parus major (EO) (not on the AOS Check-list; scientific name and placement are per Clements)

== Larks ==
Order: Passeriformes Family: Alaudidae

Larks are small terrestrial birds with often extravagant songs and display flights. Most larks are fairly dull in appearance. They feed on insects and seeds. One species has been recorded in Maryland.

- Horned lark, Eremophila alpestris

== Swallows ==
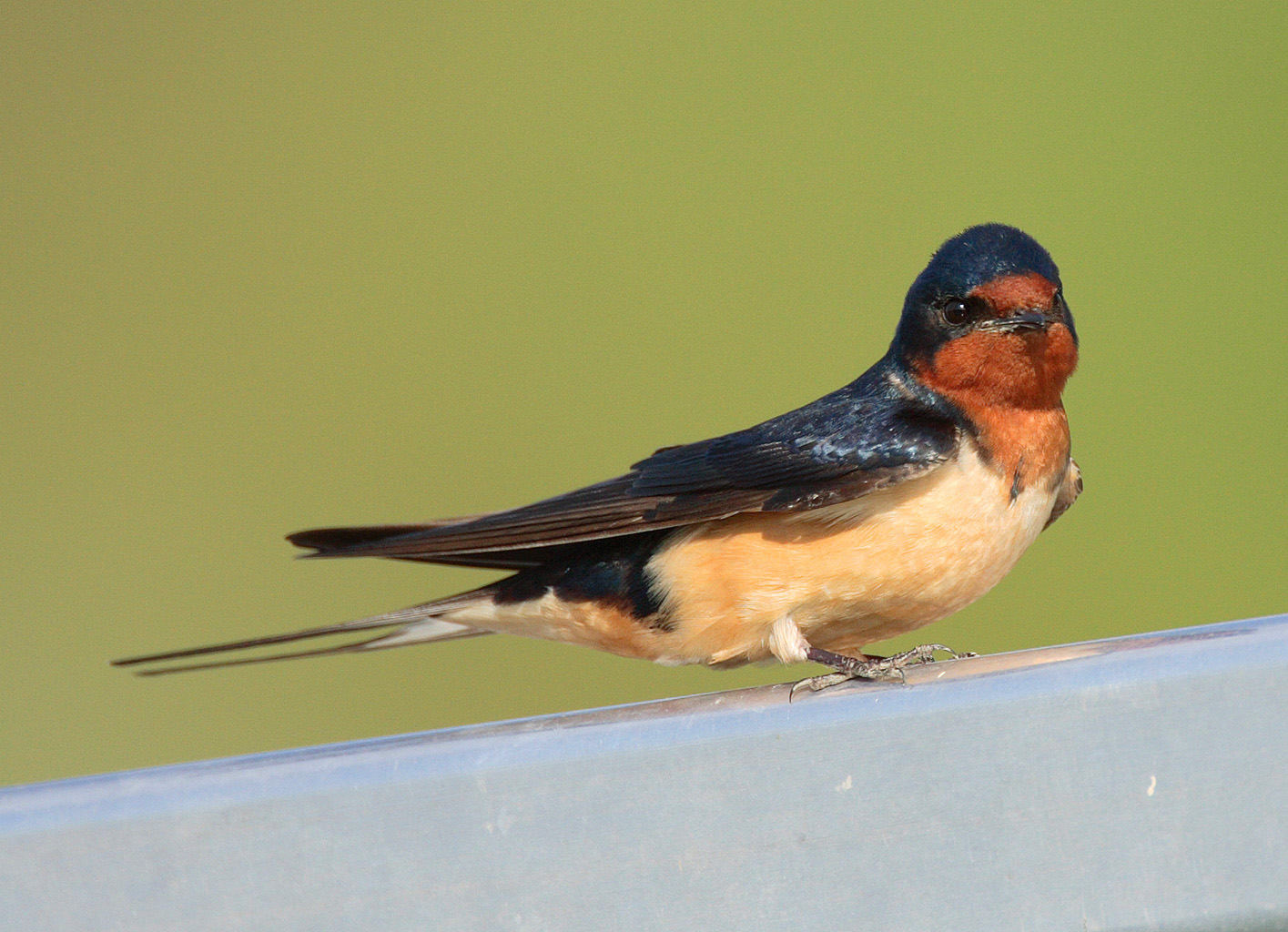
Barn swallow

Order: Passeriformes Family: Hirundinidae

The family Hirundinidae is adapted to aerial feeding. They have a slender streamlined body, long pointed wings, and a short bill with a wide gape. The feet are adapted to perching rather than walking and the front toes are partially joined at the base. Seven species have been recorded in Maryland.

- Bank swallow, Riparia riparia
- Tree swallow, Tachycineta bicolor
- Northern rough-winged swallow, Stelgidopteryx serripennis
- Purple martin, Progne subis
- Barn swallow, Hirundo rustica
- Cliff swallow, Petrochelidon pyrrhonota
- Cave swallow, Petrochelidon fulva

== Kinglets ==
Order: Passeriformes Family: Regulidae

The kinglets are a family of small insectivorous birds. The adults have colored crowns, giving rise to their name. Two species have been recorded in Maryland.

- Ruby-crowned kinglet, Corthylio calendula
- Golden-crowned kinglet, Regulus satrapa

== Waxwings ==
Order: Passeriformes Family: Bombycillidae

The waxwings are a group of birds with soft silky plumage and unique red tips to some of the wing feathers. In the Bohemian and cedar waxwings, these tips look like sealing wax and give the group its name. These are arboreal birds of northern forests. They live on insects in summer and berries in winter. Two species have been recorded in Maryland.

- Bohemian waxwing, Bombycilla garrulus (R)
- Cedar waxwing, Bombycilla cedrorum

== Nuthatches ==
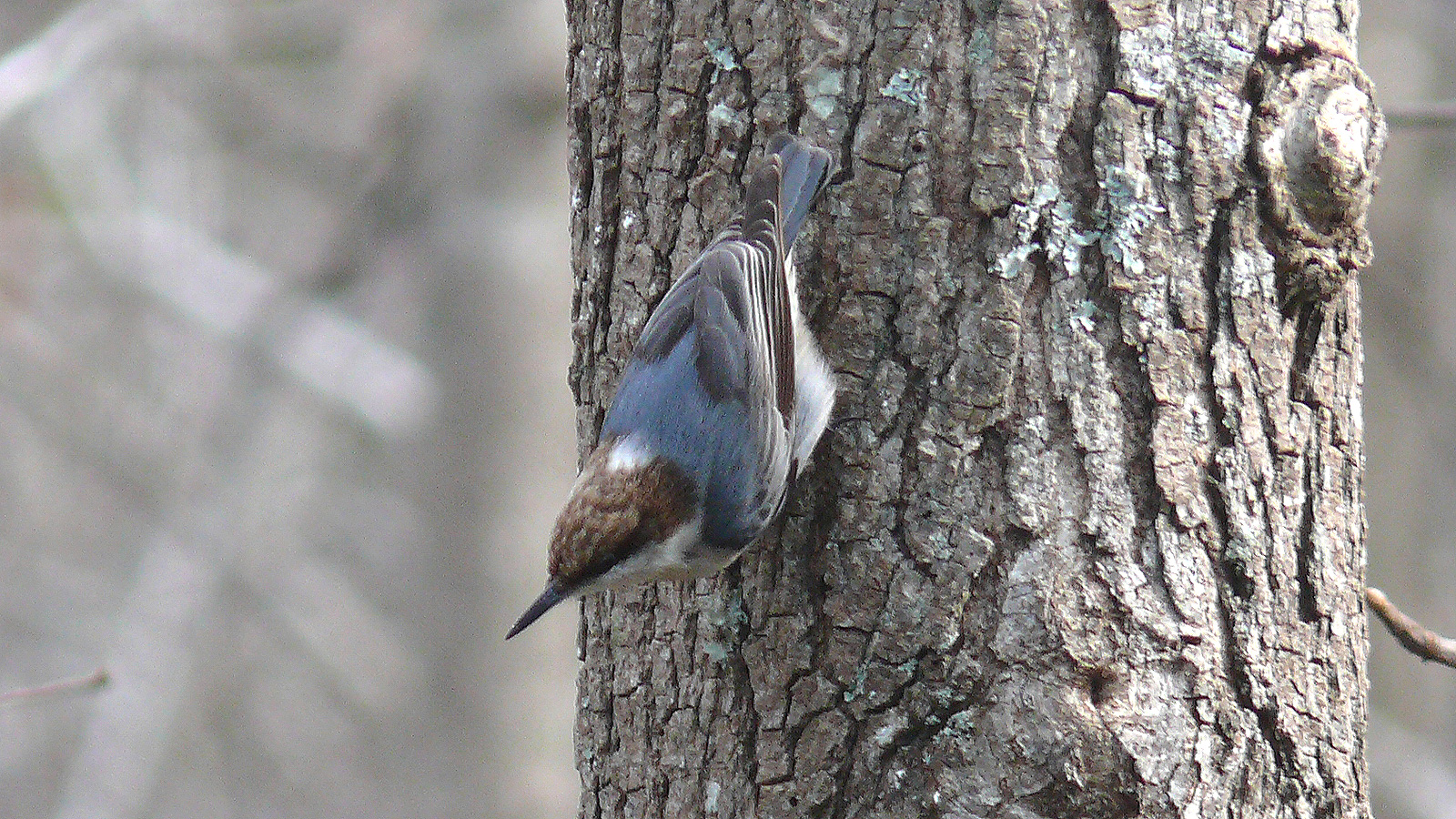
Brown-headed nuthatch

Order: Passeriformes Family: Sittidae

Nuthatches are small woodland birds. They have the unusual ability to climb down trees head first, unlike other birds, which can only go upwards. Nuthatches have big heads, short tails, and powerful bills and feet. Three species have been recorded in Maryland.

- Red-breasted nuthatch, Sitta canadensis
- White-breasted nuthatch, Sitta carolinensis
- Brown-headed nuthatch, Sitta pusilla (R*)

== Treecreepers ==
Order: Passeriformes Family: Certhiidae

Treecreepers are small woodland birds with brown backs and white underparts. They have thin pointed down-curved bills, which they use to extricate insects from bark. They have stiff tail feathers, like woodpeckers, which they use to support themselves on vertical trees. One species has been recorded in Maryland.

- Brown creeper, Certhia americana

== Gnatcatchers ==
Order: Passeriformes Family: Polioptilidae

These dainty birds resemble Old World warblers in their structure and habits, moving restlessly through foliage while seeking insects. The gnatcatchers are mainly a soft bluish gray in color and have the long sharp bill typical of an insectivore. Many species have distinctive black head patterns (especially males) and long, regularly cocked black-and-white tails. One species has been recorded in Maryland.

- Blue-gray gnatcatcher, Polioptila caerulea

== Wrens ==
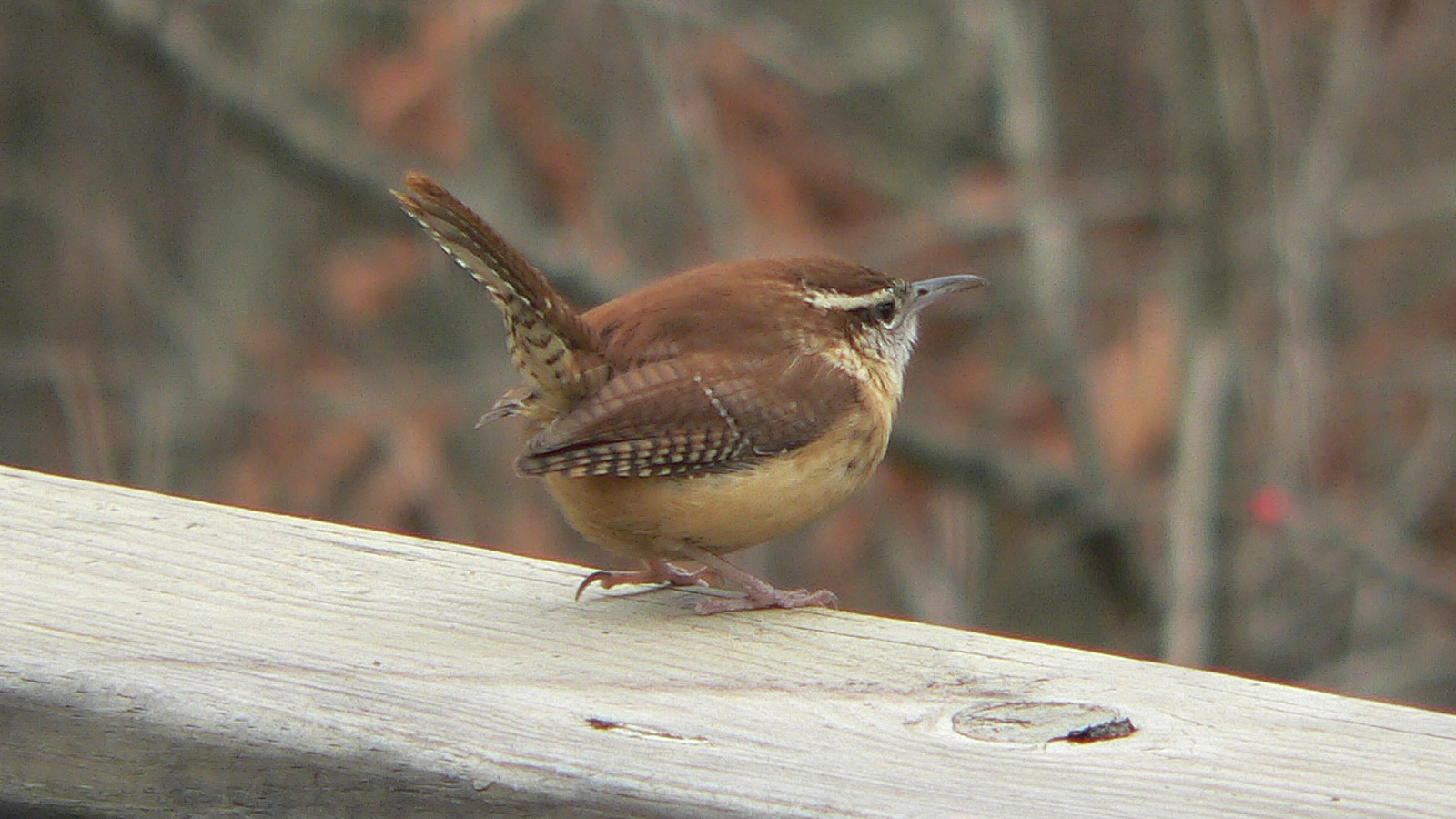
Carolina wren

Order: Passeriformes Family: Troglodytidae

Wrens are small and inconspicuous birds, except for their loud songs. They have short wings and thin down-turned bills. Several species often hold their tails upright. All are insectivorous. Seven species have been recorded in Maryland.

- Rock wren, Salpinctes obsoletus (R)
- House wren, Troglodytes aedon
- Winter wren, Troglodytes hiemalis
- Sedge wren, Cistothorus platensis
- Marsh wren, Cistothorus palustris
- Carolina wren, Thryothorus ludovicianus
- Bewick's wren, Thryomanes bewickii (R)

== Mockingbirds and thrashers ==
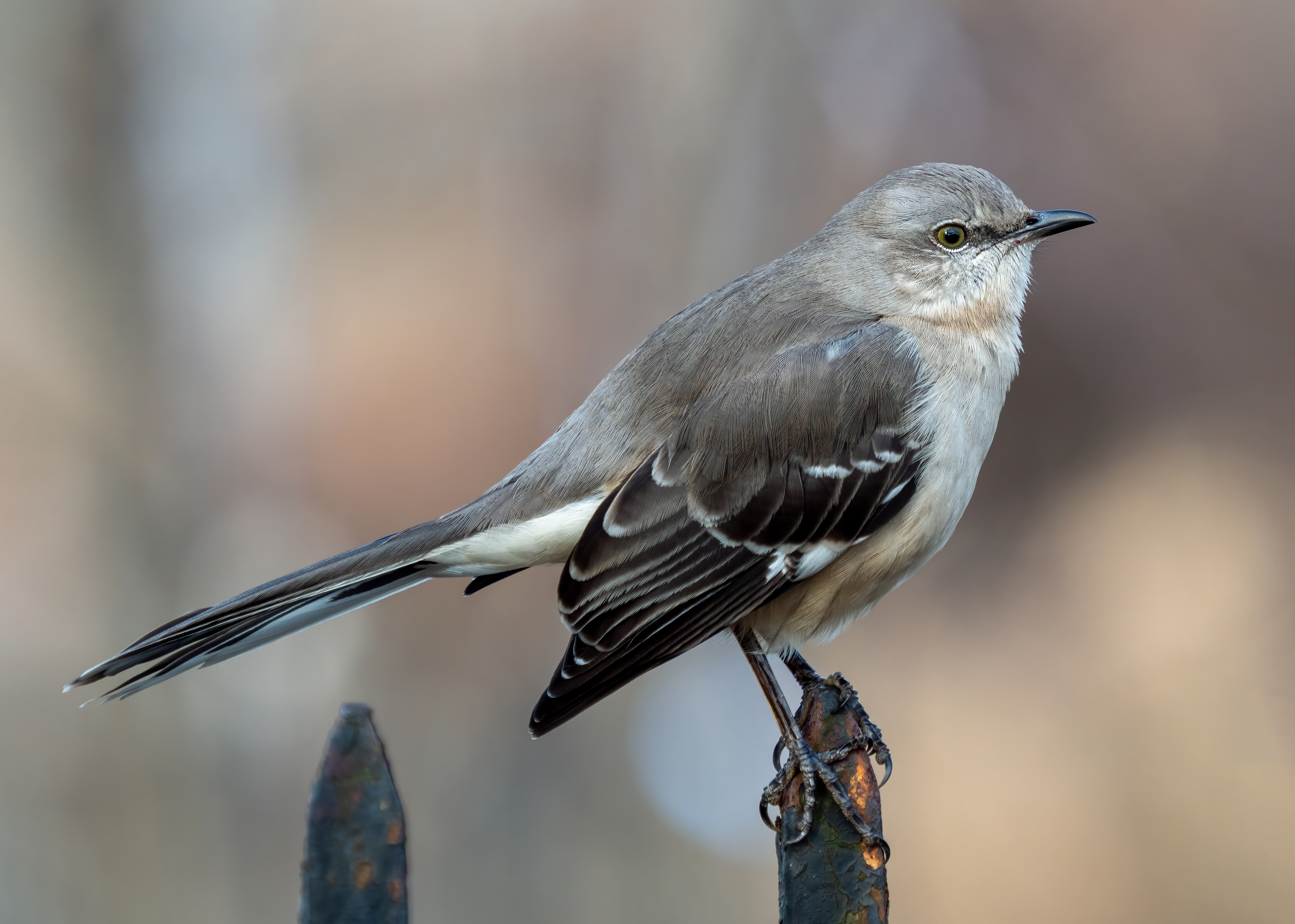
Northern mockingbird

Order: Passeriformes Family: Mimidae

The mimids are a family of passerine birds which includes thrashers, mockingbirds, tremblers, and the New World catbirds. These birds are notable for their vocalization, especially their remarkable ability to mimic a wide variety of birds and other sounds heard outdoors. The species' appearance tends towards dull grays and browns in plumage. Five species have been recorded in Maryland.

- Gray catbird, Dumetella carolinensis
- Brown thrasher, Toxostoma rufum
- Sage thrasher, Oreoscoptes montanus (R)
- Northern mockingbird, Mimus polyglottos
- Chalk-browed mockingbird, Mimus saturninus (accidental) (not on the AOS Check-list)

== Starlings ==
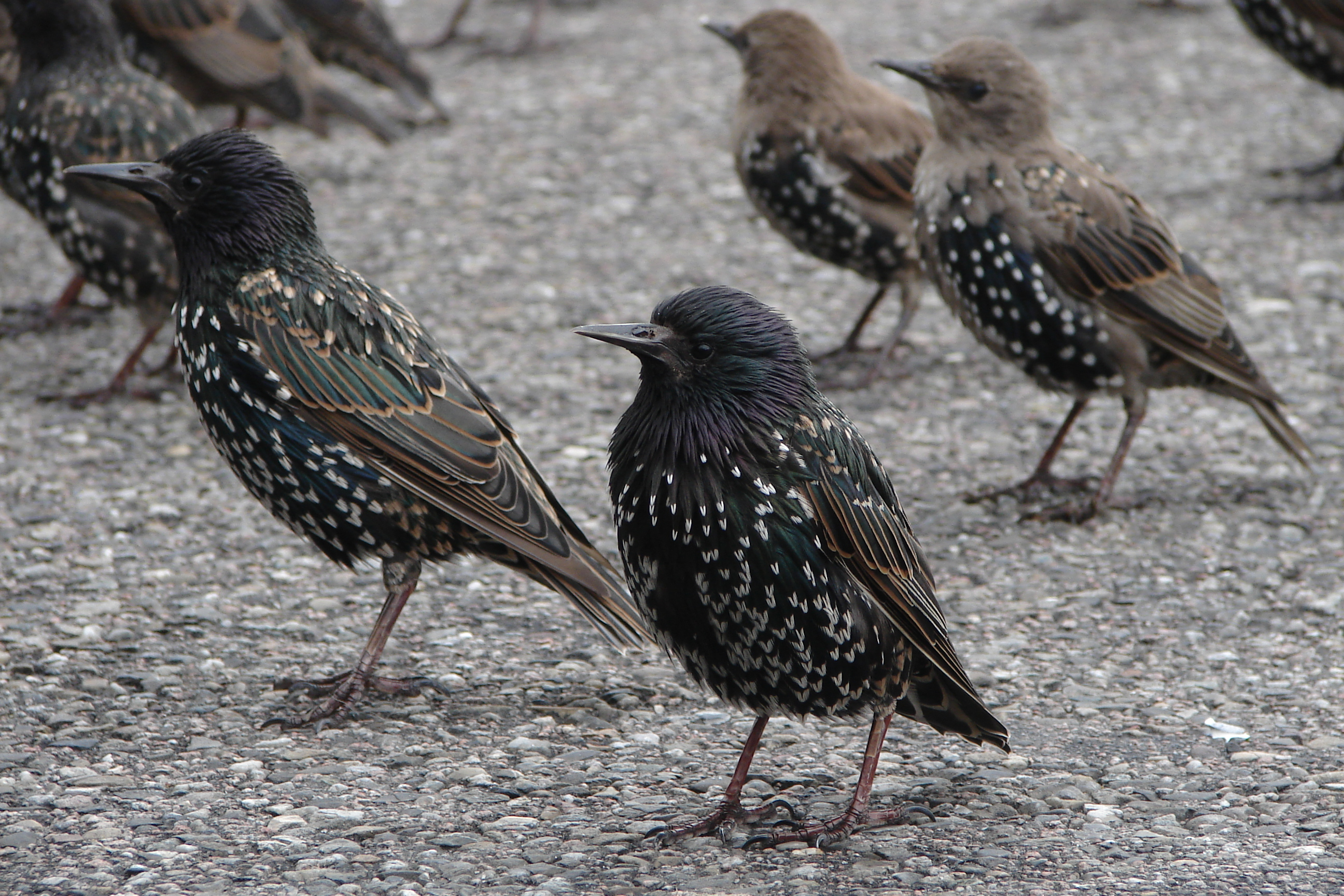
European starling

Order: Passeriformes Family: Sturnidae

Starlings are small- to medium-sized Old World passerine birds with strong feet. Their flight is strong and direct and most are gregarious. Their preferred habitat is fairly open country, and they eat insects and fruit. The plumage of several species is dark with a metallic sheen. One species has been recorded in Maryland.

- European starling, Sturnus vulgaris (I)

== Thrushes and allies ==
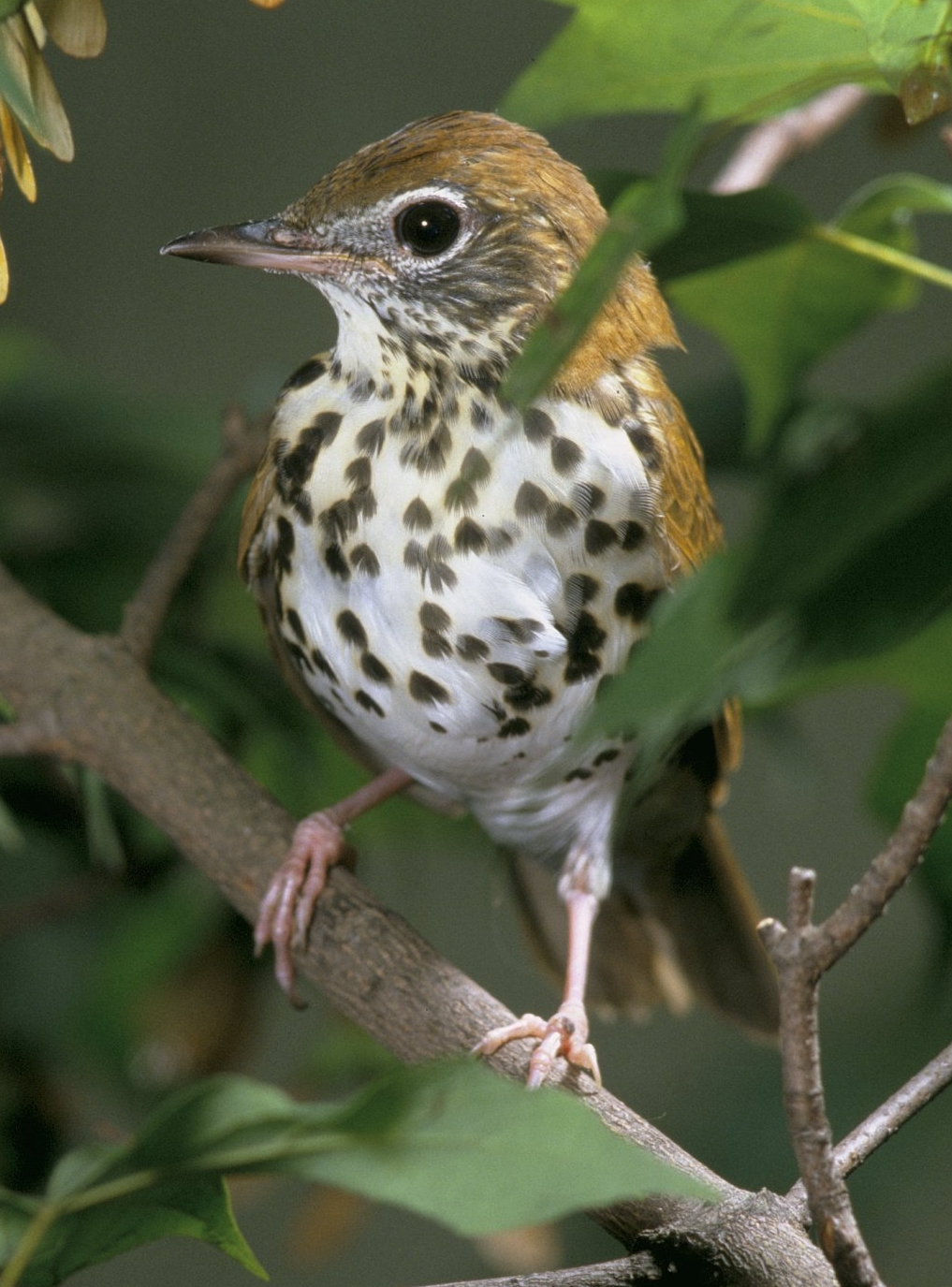
Wood thrush

Order: Passeriformes Family: Turdidae

The thrushes are a group of passerine birds that inhabit mainly but not exclusively in the Old World. They are plump, soft plumaged, small- to medium-sized insectivores or sometimes omnivores, often feeding on the ground. Eleven species have been recorded in Maryland.

- Eastern bluebird, Sialia sialis
- Mountain bluebird, Sialia currucoides (R)
- Townsend's solitaire, Myadestes townsendi (R)
- Veery, Catharus fuscescens
- Gray-cheeked thrush, Catharus minimus
- Bicknell's thrush, Catharus bicknelli (R*)
- Swainson's thrush, Catharus ustulatus
- Hermit thrush, Catharus guttatus
- Wood thrush, Hylocichla mustelina
- American robin, Turdus migratorius
- Varied thrush, Ixoreus naevius (R)

== Old World flycatchers ==
Order: Passeriformes Family: Muscicapidae

The Old World flycatchers form a large family of small passerine birds. These are mainly small arboreal insectivores, many of which, as the name implies, take their prey on the wing. One species has been recorded in Maryland.

- Northern wheatear, Oenanthe oenanthe (R)

== Old World sparrows ==
Order: Passeriformes Family: Passeridae

Old World sparrows are small passerine birds. In general, these sparrows tend to be small plump brownish or grayish birds with short tails and short powerful beaks. Sparrows are seed eaters, but they also consume small insects. One species has been recorded in Maryland.

- House sparrow, Passer domesticus (I)

== Wagtails and pipits ==
Order: Passeriformes Family: Motacillidae

Motacillidae is a family of small passerine birds with medium to long tails. They include the wagtails, longclaws, and pipits. They are slender, ground-feeding insectivores of open country. One species has been recorded in Maryland.

- American pipit, Anthus rubescens

== Finches, euphonias, and allies ==
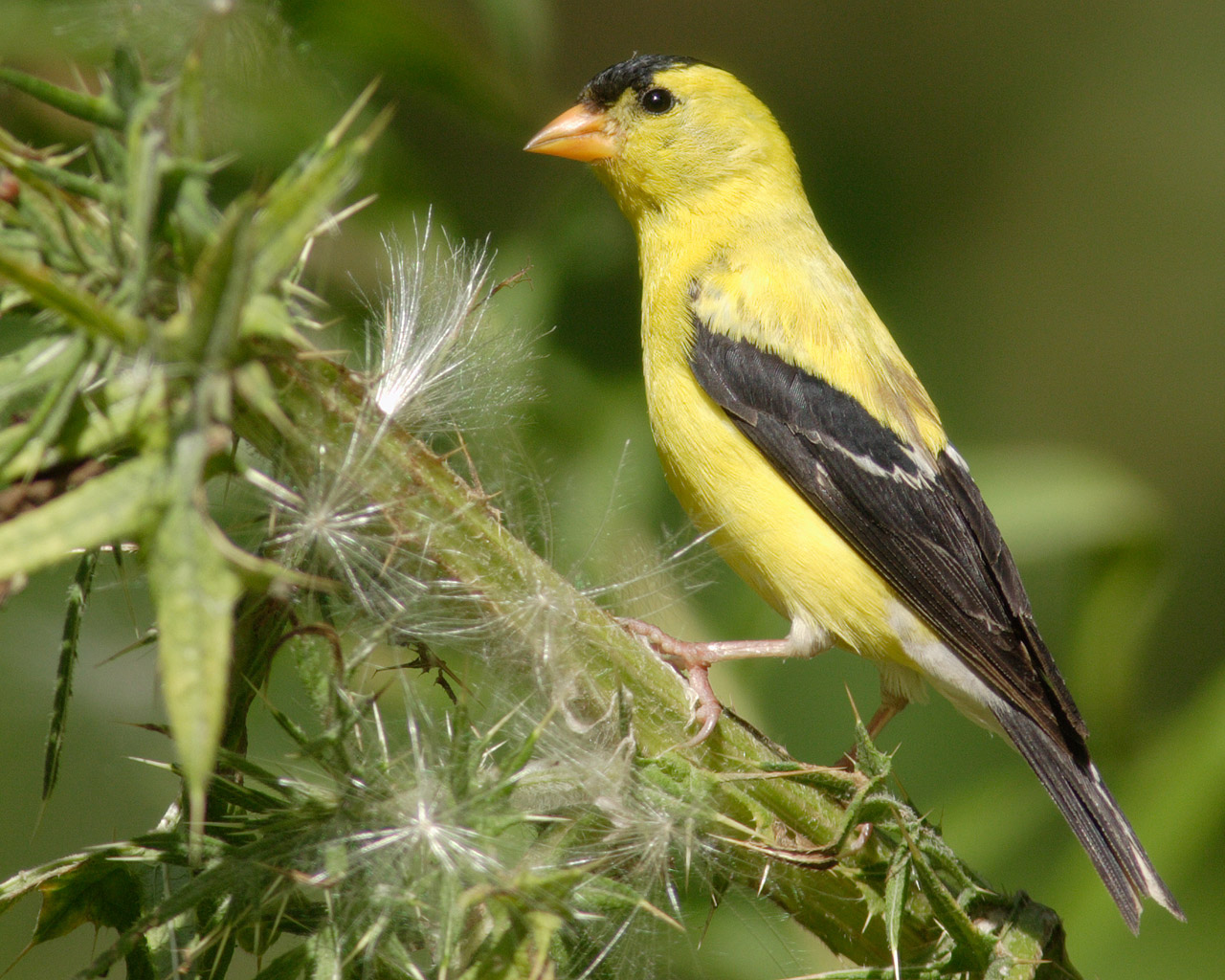
American goldfinch

Order: Passeriformes Family: Fringillidae

Finches are seed-eating passerine birds that are small to moderately large and have a strong beak, usually conical and in some species very large. All have twelve tail feathers and nine primaries. These birds have a bouncing flight with alternating bouts of flapping and gliding on closed wings, and most sing well. Ten confirmed species and two species of questionable origin have been recorded in Maryland.

- Evening grosbeak, Coccothraustes vespertinus
- Pine grosbeak, Pinicola enucleator (R)
- House finch, Haemorhous mexicanus (native to the southwestern U.S.; introduced in the east)
- Purple finch, Haemorhous purpureus
- Common redpoll, Acanthis flammea
- Hoary redpoll, Acanthis hornemanni (R)
- European greenfinch, Chloris chloris (QO) (not on the AOS Check-list; scientific name and placement are per Clements)
- Red crossbill, Loxia curvirostra
- White-winged crossbill, Loxia leucoptera
- European goldfinch, Carduelis tristis (QO)
- Pine siskin, Spinus pinus
- American goldfinch, Spinus tristis

== Longspurs and snow buntings ==
Order: Passeriformes Family: Calcariidae

The Calcariidae are a group of passerine birds that had been traditionally grouped with the New World sparrows, but differ in a number of respects and are usually found in open grassy areas. Four species have been recorded in Maryland.

- Lapland longspur, Calcarius lapponicus
- Chestnut-collared longspur, Calcarius ornatus (R)
- Smith's longspur, Calcarius pictus (R)
- Snow bunting, Plectrophenax nivalis

== New World sparrows ==
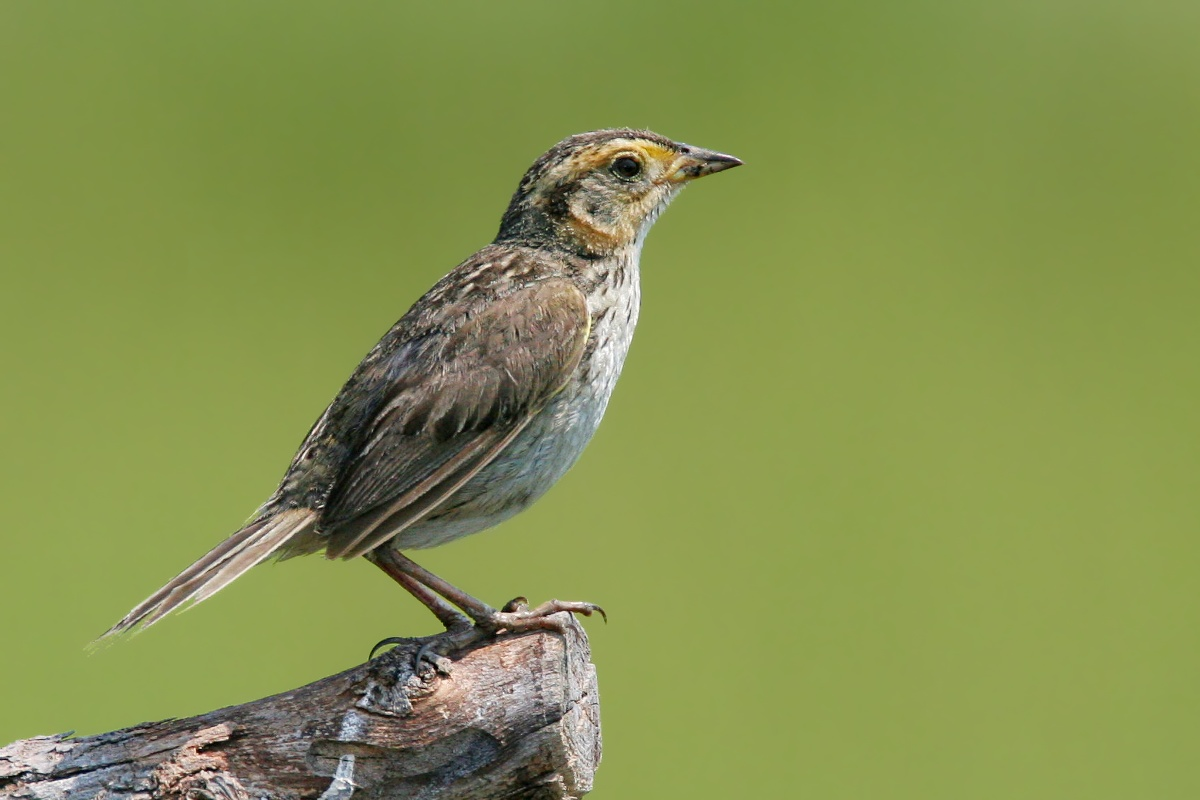
Saltmarsh sparrow

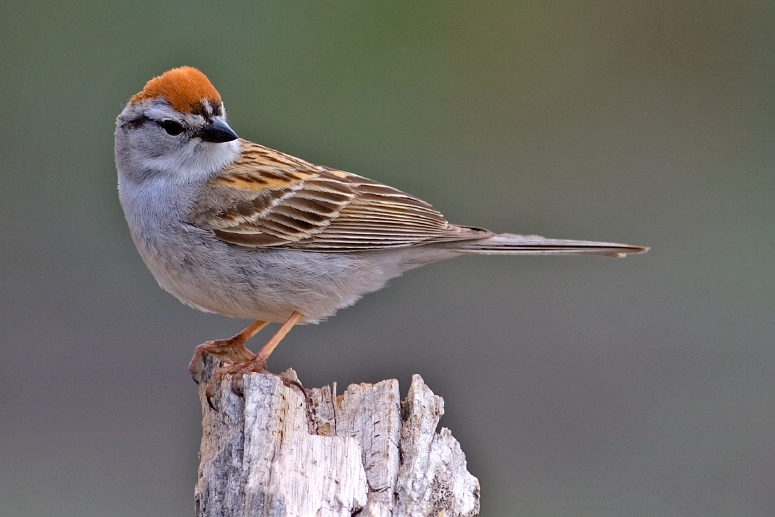
Chipping sparrow

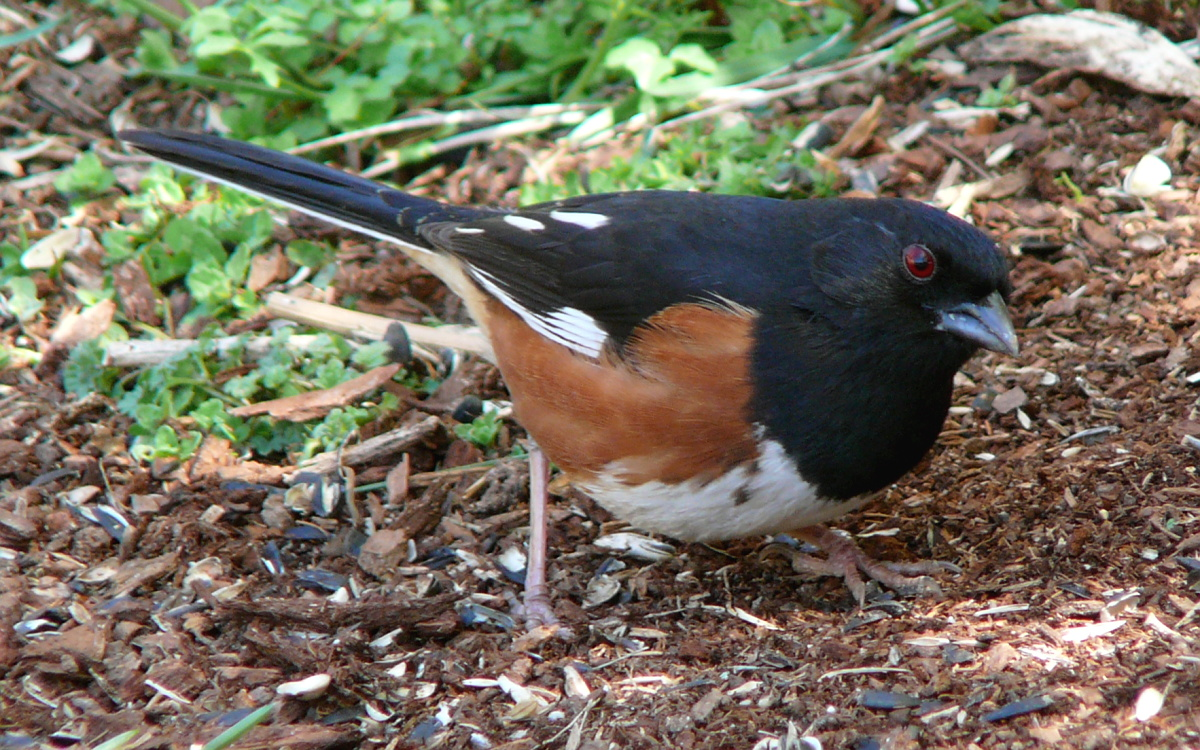
Eastern towhee

Order: Passeriformes Family: Passerellidae

Until 2017, these species were considered part of the family Emberizidae. Most of the species are known as sparrows, but these birds are not closely related to the Old World sparrows which are in the family Passeridae. Many of these have distinctive head patterns. Twenty-nine species have been recorded in Maryland.

- Cassin's sparrow, Peucaea cassinii (R)
- Bachman's sparrow, Peucaea aestivalis (R)
- Grasshopper sparrow, Ammodramus savannarum
- Lark sparrow, Chondestes grammacus
- Lark bunting, Calamospiza melanocorys (R)
- Chipping sparrow, Spizella passerina
- Clay-colored sparrow, Spizella pallida
- Field sparrow, Spizella pusilla
- Fox sparrow, Passerella iliaca
- American tree sparrow, Spizelloides arborea
- Dark-eyed junco, Junco hyemalis
- White-crowned sparrow, Zonotrichia leucophrys
- Golden-crowned sparrow, Zonotrichia atricapilla (R)
- Harris's sparrow, Zonotrichia querula (R)
- White-throated sparrow, Zonotrichia albicollis
- Vesper sparrow, Pooecetes gramineus
- LeConte's sparrow, Ammospiza leconteii (R)
- Seaside sparrow, Ammospiza maritima (R*)
- Nelson's sparrow, Ammospiza nelsoni
- Saltmarsh sparrow, Ammospiza caudacuta (R*)
- Baird's sparrow, Centronyx bairdii (R)
- Henslow's sparrow, Centronyx henslowii (R*)
- Savannah sparrow, Passerculus sandwichensis
- Song sparrow, Melospiza melodia
- Lincoln's sparrow, Melospiza lincolnii
- Swamp sparrow, Melospiza georgiana
- Green-tailed towhee, Pipilo chlorurus (R)
- Spotted towhee, Pipilo maculatus (R)
- Eastern towhee, Pipilo erythrophthalmus

== Yellow-breasted chat ==
Order: Passeriformes Family: Icteriidae

This species was historically placed in the wood-warblers (Parulidae) but nonetheless most authorities were unsure if it belonged there. It was placed in its own family in 2017.

- Yellow-breasted chat, Icteria virens

== Troupials and allies ==
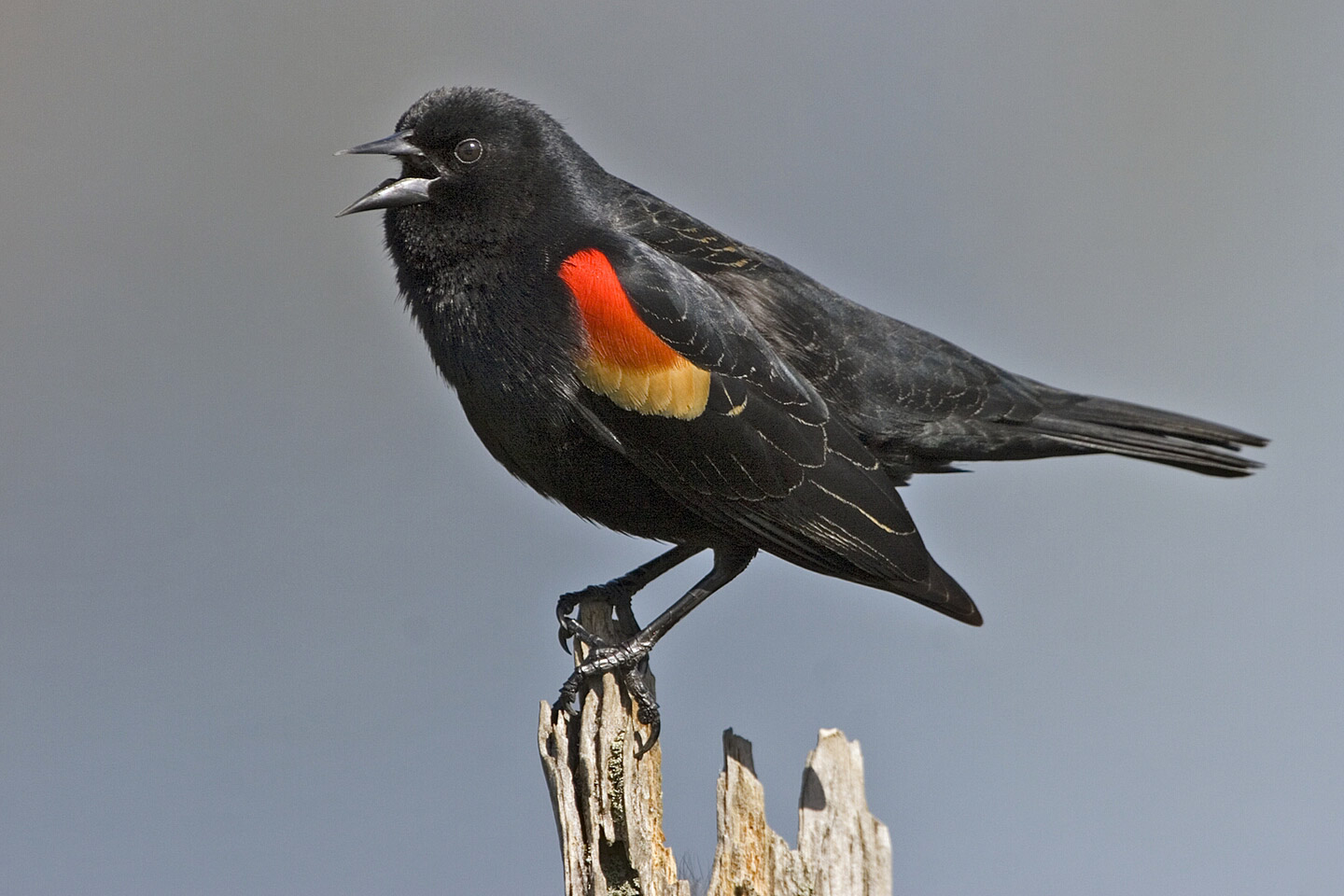
Red-winged blackbird

Order: Passeriformes Family: Icteridae

The icterids are a group of small-to-medium, often colorful passerine birds restricted to the New World and include the grackles, New World blackbirds, and New World orioles. Most species have black as a predominant plumage color, often enlivened by yellow, orange, or red. Fourteen species have been recorded in Maryland.

- Yellow-headed blackbird, Xanthocephalus xanthocephalus (R*)
- Bobolink, Dolichonyx oryzivorus
- Eastern meadowlark, Sturnella magna
- Western meadowlark, Sturnella neglecta (R)
- Orchard oriole, Icterus spurius
- Bullock's oriole, Icterus bullockii (R)
- Baltimore oriole, Icterus galbula
- Red-winged blackbird, Agelaius phoeniceus
- Shiny cowbird, Molothrus bonariensis (R)
- Brown-headed cowbird, Molothrus ater
- Rusty blackbird, Euphagus carolinus
- Brewer's blackbird, Euphagus cyanocephalus (R)
- Common grackle, Quiscalus quiscula
- Boat-tailed grackle, Quiscalus major (R*)

== New World warblers ==
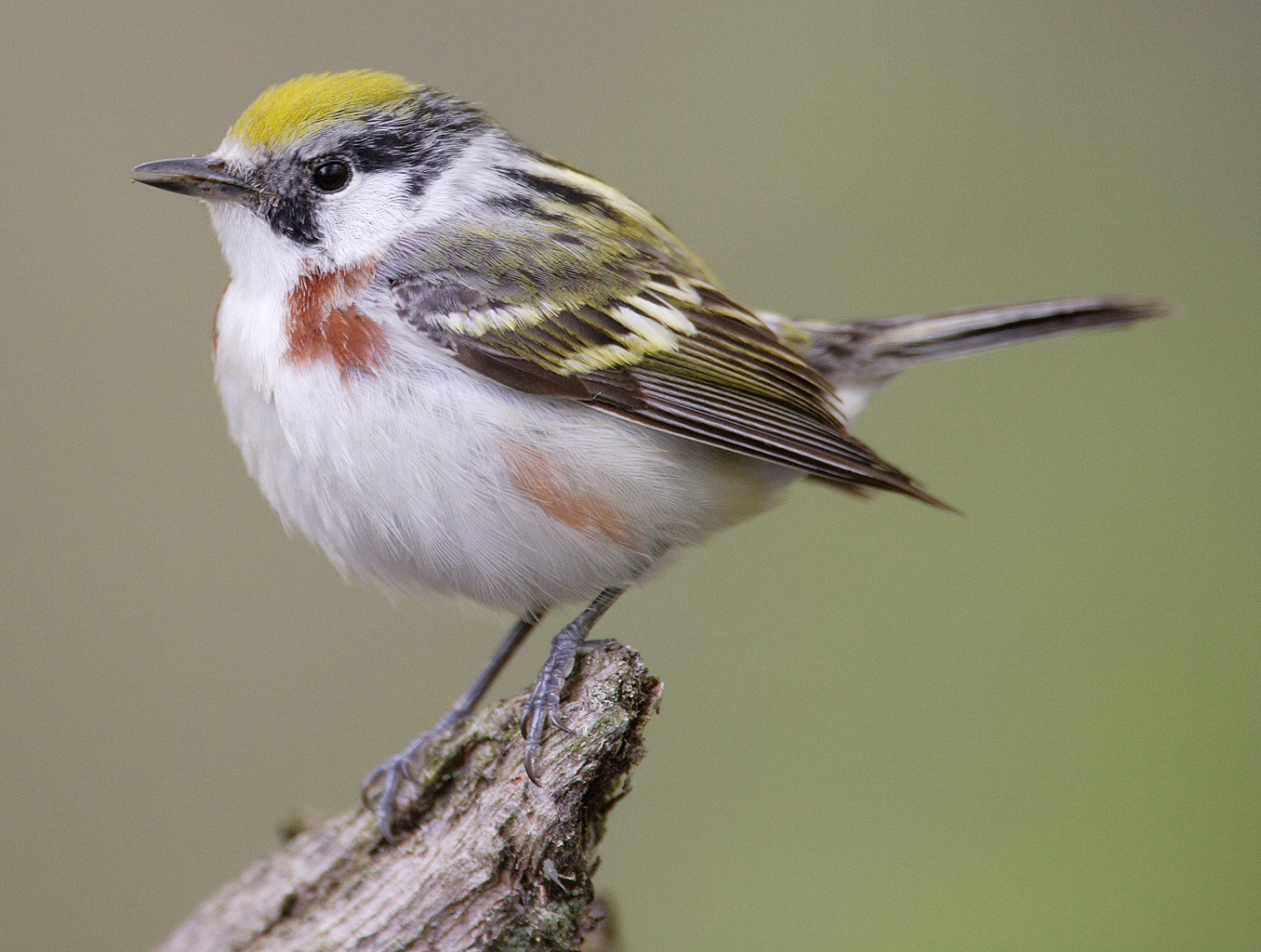
Chestnut-sided warbler

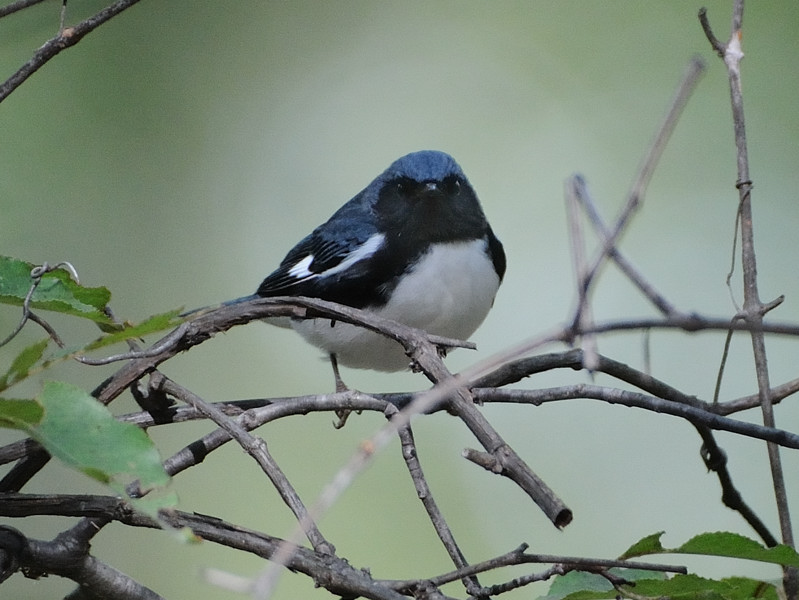
Black-throated blue warbler

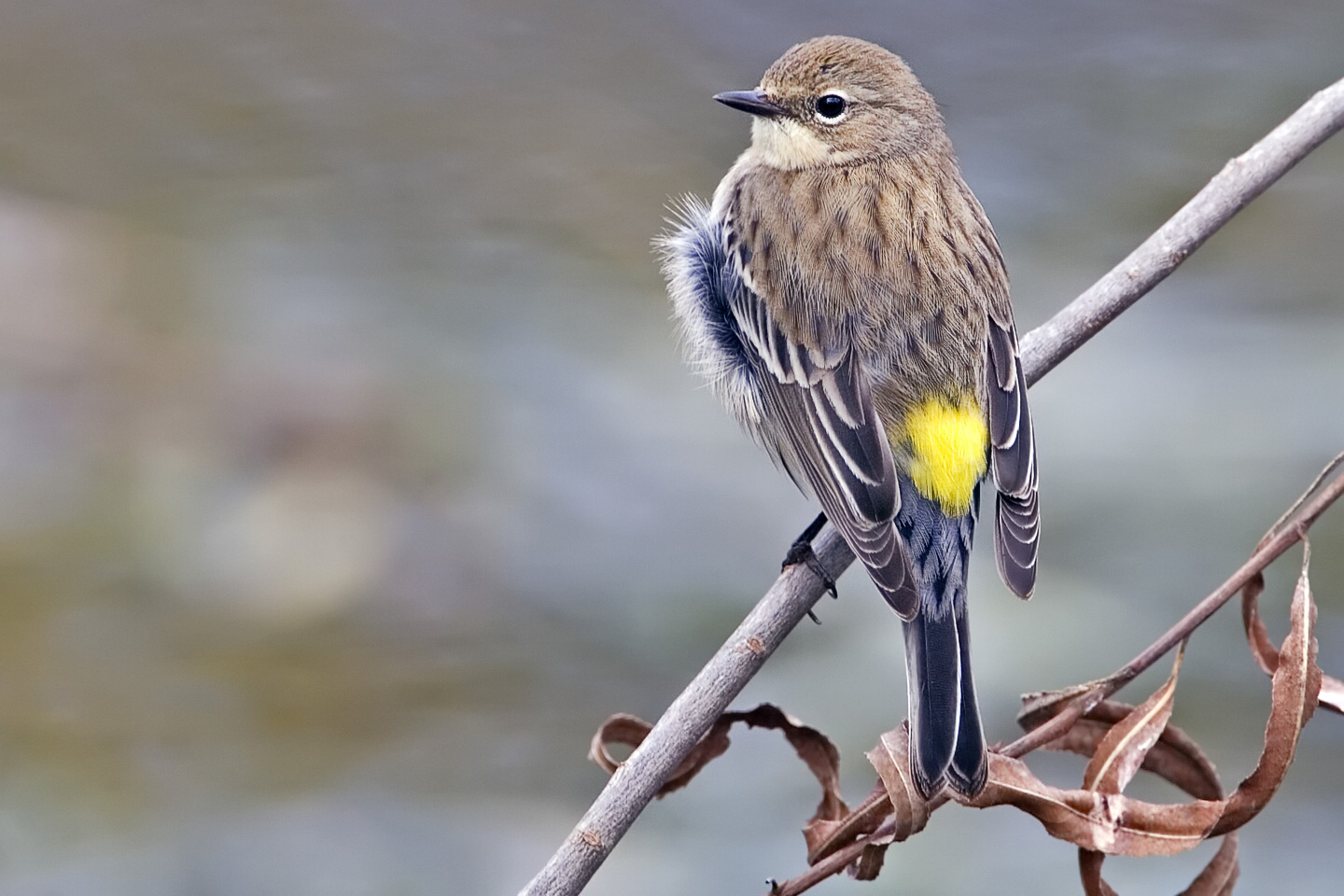
Yellow-rumped warbler

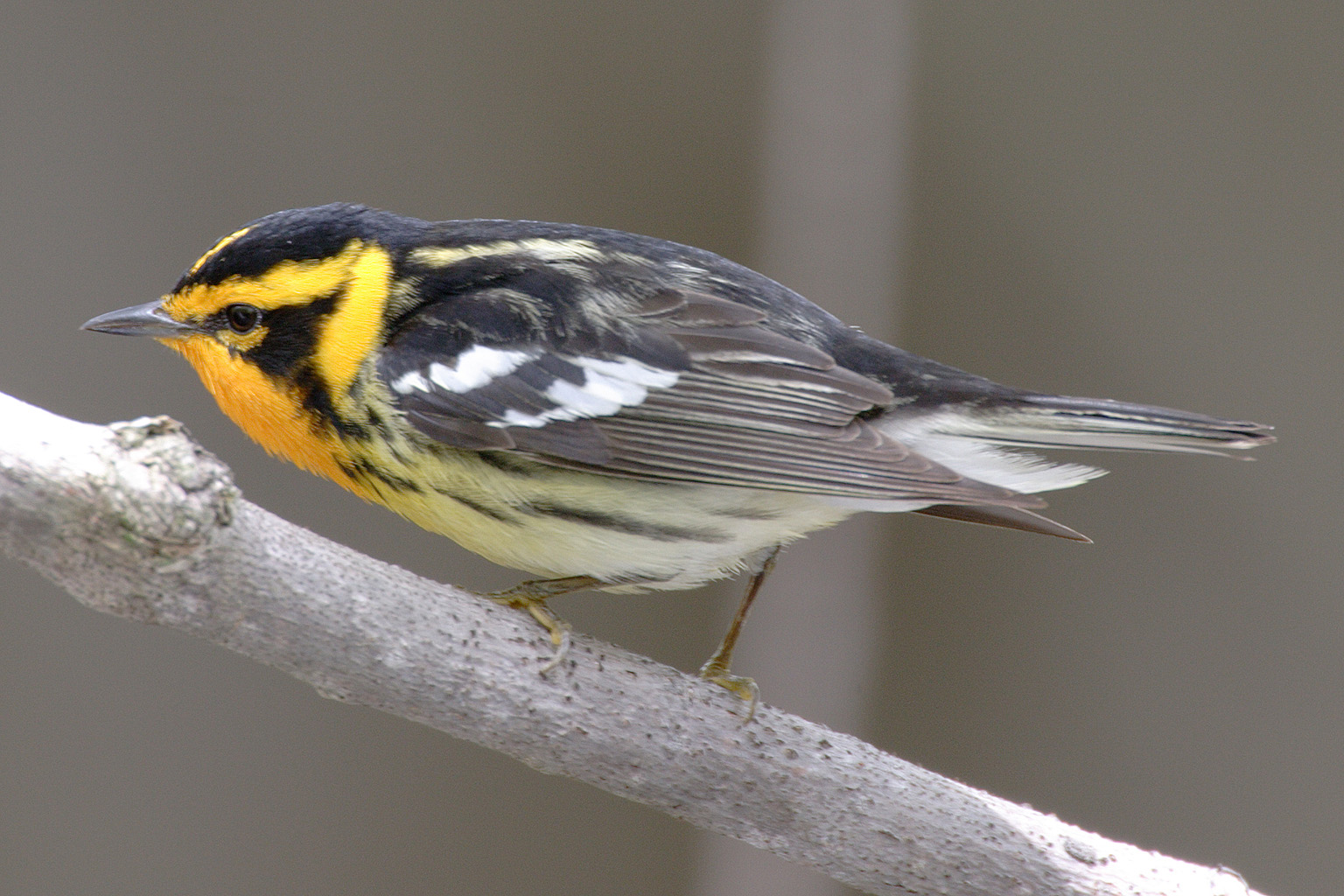
Blackburnian warbler

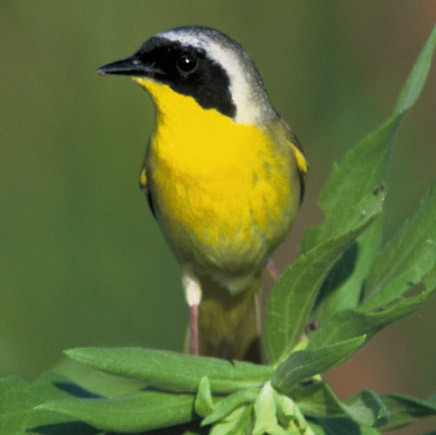
Common yellowthroat

Order: Passeriformes Family: Parulidae

The wood-warblers are a group of small, often colorful passerine birds restricted to the New World. Most are arboreal, but some are more terrestrial, such as the Ovenbird. Most members of this family are insectivores. Forty-one species have been recorded in Maryland.

- Ovenbird, Seiurus aurocapilla
- Worm-eating warbler, Helmitheros vermivorum
- Louisiana waterthrush, Parkesia motacilla
- Northern waterthrush, Parkesia noveboracensis
- Golden-winged warbler, Vermivora chrysoptera
- Blue-winged warbler, Vermivora cyanoptera
- Black-and-white warbler, Mniotilta varia
- Prothonotary warbler, Protonotaria citrea
- Swainson's warbler, Limnothlypis swainsonii (R)
- Tennessee warbler, Leiothlypis peregrina
- Orange-crowned warbler, Leiothlypis celata
- Nashville warbler, Leiothlypis ruficapilla
- Virginia's warbler, Leiothlypis virginiae (R)
- Connecticut warbler, Oporornis agilis
- Mourning warbler, Geothlypis philadelphia
- Kentucky warbler, Geothlypis formosa
- Common yellowthroat, Geothlypis trichas
- Hooded warbler, Setophaga citrina
- American redstart, Setophaga ruticilla
- Cape May warbler, Setophaga tigrina
- Cerulean warbler, Setophaga cerulea
- Northern parula, Setophaga americana
- Magnolia warbler, Setophaga magnolia
- Bay-breasted warbler, Setophaga castanea
- Blackburnian warbler, Setophaga fusca
- Yellow warbler, Setophaga petechia
- Chestnut-sided warbler, Setophaga pensylvanica
- Blackpoll warbler, Setophaga striata
- Black-throated blue warbler, Setophaga caerulescens
- Palm warbler, Setophaga palmarum
- Pine warbler, Setophaga pinus
- Yellow-rumped warbler, Setophaga coronata
- Yellow-throated warbler, Setophaga dominica
- Prairie warbler, Setophaga discolor
- Black-throated gray warbler, Setophaga nigrescens (R)
- Kirtland's warbler, Setophaga kirtlandii (R)
- Townsend's warbler, Setophaga townsendi (R)
- Hermit warbler, Setophaga occidentalis (R)
- Black-throated green warbler, Setophaga virens
- Canada warbler, Cardellina canadensis
- Wilson's warbler, Cardellina pusilla

== Cardinals and allies ==
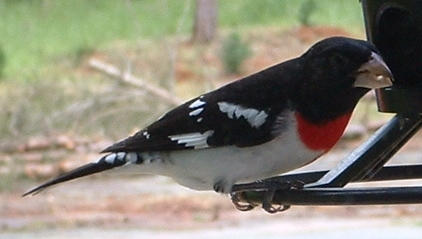
Rose-breasted grosbeak

Order: Passeriformes Family: Cardinalidae

The Cardinals are a family of robust, seed-eating birds with strong bills. They typically live in open woodland. The sexes usually have distinct plumages. Eleven species have been recorded in Maryland.

- Summer tanager, Piranga rubra (R*)
- Scarlet tanager, Piranga olivacea
- Western tanager, Piranga ludoviciana (R)
- Northern cardinal, Cardinalis cardinalis
- Rose-breasted grosbeak, Pheucticus ludovicianus
- Black-headed grosbeak, Pheucticus melanocephalus (R)
- Blue grosbeak, Passerina caerulea
- Lazuli bunting, Passerina amoena (R)
- Indigo bunting, Passerina cyanea
- Painted bunting, Passerina ciris (R*)
- Dickcissel, Spiza americana

== See also ==
- List of birds
- Lists of birds by region
- List of North American birds
