= Alta =

Alta or ALTA may refer to:

== Places ==
=== Canada ===
- Alta Creek, the official name of the River of Golden Dreams, in Whistler, British Columbia
- Alta Lake (British Columbia), a lake in Whistler
- Mont Alta, a hill in the Laurentian Mountains of Quebec, basis of the Ski Mont Alta ski hill - see List of former ski areas of Quebec
- Alberta, a province abbreviated Alta.

=== Norway ===
- Alta Municipality, a municipality
  - Alta (town), a town within the municipality
  - Alta Airport, an airport in the municipality

=== United States ===
- Alta, California, an unincorporated community and census-designated place
- Alta, Illinois, an unincorporated community
- Alta, Indiana, an unincorporated community
- Alta, Iowa, a city
- Alta, Utah, a town
  - Alta Ski Area, a ski area located in the Wasatch Mountains, in Salt Lake County, Utah
- Alta, Fayette County, West Virginia, an unincorporated community
- Alta, Greenbrier County, West Virginia, an unincorporated community
- Alta, Wyoming, a census-designated place
- Alta Township, Harvey County, Kansas
- Alta Township, Barnes County, North Dakota
- Alta Lake, in Alta Lake State Park, Washington state
- Alta Peak, a mountain in the Sequoia National Park

=== Elsewhere ===
- Älta, a locality in Nacka Municipality, Sweden
- Alta (river), Ukraine
- Lake Alta, South Island, New Zealand
- Alta Reef, part of the Bendigo Goldfields, South Island, New Zealand

== People ==
- Alta (given name), a list of people with the given name or nickname
- Alta (poet), American poet and prose writer Alta Gerrey (1942–2024)
- Eelco Alta (1723–1798), Frisian clergyman, theologian and contributor to veterinary medicine

== Acronyms ==
- Alt-A, short for Alternative A-paper, a type of US mortgage
- American Land Title Association, a national trade association
- American Literary Translators Association, an American association
- Amur Leopard and Tiger Alliance or ALTA, an initiative to conserve the Amur leopard and Amur tiger
- Atlanta Lawn Tennis Association
- Accelerated life testing or Accelerated life testing analysis

== Businesses ==
- Alta (vehicles), a defunct Greek manufacturer of cars, light trucks and motorcycles
- Alta Architects, an American architecture firm based in San Antonio, Texas
- Alta banka a.d., a Serbian bank
- Alta Bike Share, a provider of bicycle sharing systems in the United States and Australia
- Alta Car and Engineering Company, an English automobile and Formula One racing manufacturer
- Alta Copper, a Canadian mining company
- Alta Devices, an American photovoltaics manufacturer
- Alta Flights, a former charter airline based in Edmonton, Alberta, Canada
- Alta Group Newspapers, a defunct American newspaper publisher
- Alta Motors, a defunct American manufacturer of electric motorcycles
- Alta Newspaper Group, a newspaper publisher in Western Canada and Quebec
- Alta Records, Dallas, Texas
- Alta Wind Energy Center, Kern County, California

== Ships ==
- MV Alta, a ship that was abandoned at sea in 2018 and ran aground in Ireland in 2020
- Alta-class minesweeper, a Royal Norwegian Navy ship class
- HNoMS Alta, a former Royal Norwegian Navy Sauda-class mine countermeasure vessel

== Other uses ==
- Alta (novel), a 2004 fantasy novel by Mercedes Lackey
- Alta, Spanish term equivalent to the dance Saltarello
- Alta High School (Iowa), Alta, Iowa, United States
- Alta High School (Utah), Sandy, Utah, United States
- Alta Club, a private club in Salt Lake City, Utah, United States
- Alta IF, a Norwegian football club based in Alta Municipality, Norway
- AV Alta FC, an American professional soccer team based in Lancaster, California
- Alta (dye), a red paste used by women in Bangladesh, India and Nepal to paint the borders of the feet
- Alta language, a pair of languages spoken in northern Luzon, the Philippines

== See also ==
- Alta Battalion, a Norwegian Army unit
- Altaelva (lit. 'Alta River'), a river in Alta Municipality in Finnmark county, Norway
- Altas (disambiguation)
- Alto (disambiguation)
- Arta (disambiguation)
