= Arta =

Arta, ARTA, or Artà may refer to:

== Places ==
=== Djibouti ===
- Arta, Djibouti, a regional capital city in southeastern Djibouti
- Arta Mountains, a mountain range in Djibouti
- Arta Region, Djibouti

=== Greece ===
- Arta, Greece, a regional capital city in northwestern Greece
- Arta (regional unit), Greece
- Ambracian Gulf, also known as the Gulf of Arta, a gulf of the Ionian Sea

=== Elsewhere ===
- Arta, Azerbaijan, a village and municipality
- Artà, an independent municipality and village on the Spanish Balearic island of Majorca
- Arta Terme, a comune (municipality) in Friuli-Venezia Giulia, Italy
- Nartë (Arta in Greek), Albania
- Medieval Despotate of Arta (1358–1416) in modern Albania

== Organizations ==
- Anti-Red Tape Authority, a Philippine government agency
- Arta FM, first Kurdish radio station in Syria
- Auckland Regional Transport Authority, New Zealand
- Autobacs Racing Team Aguri, a Japanese auto racing team
- CE Artà, a football club in Spain's Balearic Islands

== Other ==
- Arta (given name)
- Arta (crater), a crater on Mars
- Arta (moth), a genus of moths
- Arta language of the northern Philippines
- Asha (also called Arta), a concept of rightness and divine order in ancient Indo-Iranian cultures
- Arta (Kamuia), Indo-Scythian ruler in ancient India

== See also ==
- Artas (disambiguation)
- Alta (disambiguation)
- Arth (disambiguation)
