= Chanticleer =

Chanticleer may refer to:

== Fiction ==
- Chanticleer, a rooster appearing in fables about Reynard the Fox
  - A character in "The Nun's Priest's Tale", a version of "Chanticleer and the Fox" told in Chaucer's Canterbury Tales
  - The protagonist of the novel The Book of the Dun Cow, based on the cock from The Nun's Priest's Tale
- Chanticleer, the name of a rooster in the poem The First Snow-fall, by American poet James Russell Lowell (1819-1891)
- Chanticleer, a character in the 1991 movie Rock-a-Doodle, voiced by Glen Campbell
- Chanticleer, the surname of the main family in Hope Mirrlees' 1926 novel Lud-in-the-Mist
- Chanticleer, the name of a hen in Disney's 2015 adaptation of Cinderella
- Chanticleer, a rooster mentioned twice in Oscar Wilde's short story "The Canterville Ghost"
- Chanticleer, the name of the drummer orange cat in Car Seat Headrest's rock opera and thirteenth album The Scholars

== Arts ==
- Chanticleer (ensemble), a male vocal ensemble
- Chanticleer (magazine), a short-lived (1952–1954) literary magazine edited by the poets Patrick Galvin and Gordon Wharton
- Chanticleer, a race of angelic humanoids in the game Project Nomad
- The Chanticleer, a student-run magazine at Averett University in Danville, VA
- The Chanticleer (yearbook), Duke University's undergraduate yearbook
- Chanticleer (yearbook), Hellyer College's yearbook
- "Chanticleer", a long-running newspaper column focused on business, published in the Australian Financial Review

== Sports ==
- "The Chanticleers", the mascots of:
  - Rutgers University, before changing to the Scarlet Knights
  - Coastal Carolina Chanticleers, the athletics team of Coastal Carolina University, Conway, South Carolina, United States
  - Ord High School, Ord, Nebraska, United States
  - The French national rugby league team (as Les Chanticleers)

== Places ==
- Chanticleer, Arkansas, an unincorporated community in Chicot County, Arkansas, United States
- Chanticleer Garden, a botanical garden located in Wayne, Pennsylvania, United States
- Chanticleer Island, an island lying off the northwest end of Hoseason Island in the Palmer Archipelago
- Chanticleer Point, a geographical landmark on the Oregon side of the Columbia River Gorge

== Ships ==
- HMS Chanticleer, more than one ship of the British Royal Navy
- USS Chanticleer, more than one United States Navy ship
- Chanticleer-class submarine rescue vessel

== See also ==
- Chantecler (disambiguation)
