= Altamont =

Altamont may refer to:

== Places ==
=== Canada ===
- Altamont, British Columbia
- Altamont, Manitoba

=== India ===
- Altamont Road, in south Mumbai

=== United States ===
- Altamont, California
  - Altamont Pass, in California
- Altamont, Illinois
- Altamont, Kansas
- Altamont, Maryland
- Altamont, Missouri
- Altamont, New York
- Tupper Lake (town), New York, formerly Altamont, in Franklin County
- Altamont, North Carolina
- Altamont, Ohio
- Altamont, Oregon
- Altamont, Pennsylvania
- Altamont, South Carolina
- Altamont, South Dakota
- Altamont, Tennessee
- Altamont, Utah

== Enterprises and organizations ==
- Altamont Apparel, a clothing brand
- The Altamont Enterprise, a weekly newspaper in Albany County, New York
- Altamont Raceway Park, a motorsports race track located in Alameda County in Northern California and site of the Altamont Free Concert
- Altamont School, Birmingham, Alabama

== Fictional entities ==
=== Characters ===
- Captain Altamont, the archenemy of Captain Hatteras in The Adventures of Captain Hatteras
- Altamont, the alias used by Sherlock Holmes in the story "His Last Bow"
- Frederick Altamont, an alias of a pirate in Walter Scott's novel The Pirate
- Frederick Altamont Cornwallis Twistleton, 5th Earl of Ickenham, or Uncle Fred, in the P. G. Wodehouse novels
- Mr. Frederic Altamont, a character in W. M. Thackeray's Memoirs of Mr. Charles J. Yellowplush

=== Places ===
- Altamont the stand-in for Asheville, North Carolina in Thomas Wolfe's Look Homeward, Angel

== Music ==
- Altamont (band)
- Altamont Free Concert, a 1969 rock concert held in Altamont, California
- "Altamont", a song by Aphrodite's Child on their album 666
- "Altamont", a song by Echo & The Bunnymen on their album Evergreen

== Transportation ==
- Altamont Corridor Express

== See also ==
- Mont Alta, a former ski area of Quebec
