= Alta (given name) =

Alta is a feminine given name and a nickname. It may refer to:

== Given name ==
- Alta Bates (1879–1955), American nurse anesthetist, founder and director of the hospital now known as Alta Bates Summit Medical Center
- Alta Charo (born 1958), American bioethicist and law professor
- Alta Fixsler (2018–2021), British girl with Haredi parents who died after her life support was removed, subject of a best interests case
- Alta Gerrey (1942–2024), aka Alta (poet), American poet and prose writer
- Alta M. Hulett (1854–1877), American lawyer
- Alta Kotze (born 1971), South African former cricketer
- Alta Little (1923–1999), American baseball player in the All-American Girls Professional Baseball League
- Alta Rockefeller Prentice (1871–1962), American philanthropist and socialite
- Alta Schrock (1911–2001), American biology professor and community activist, first Mennonite woman in the United States to earn a Ph.D.
- Alta Faige Teitelbaum (1912–2001), Polish-born American Hasidic community leader
- Alta Corbett Thomas (1918–2017), American pilot for the Women Airforce Service Pilots
- Alta Walker (1942–2015), American geologist
- Alta Weiss (1890–1964), American semiprofessional minor league baseball pitcher
- Alta Allee Willis (1947–2019), American songwriter and art director

== Nickname ==
- Albert Alta Cohen (1908–2003), American Major League Baseball player
- Aletta Alta Schutte (born 1977), South African medical researcher
