= Geography of Maryland =

Physical regions of Maryland

The U.S. state of Maryland has a varied geography. It has an area of 12,406.68 square miles (32,133.2 km^{2}) and is comparable in overall area with Belgium [11,787 square miles (30,530 km^{2})]. It is the 42nd largest and 9th smallest state and is closest in size to the state of Hawaii (10,930.98 square miles (28,311.1 km^{2})), the next smallest state. The next largest state, its neighbor West Virginia, is almost twice the size of Maryland (24,229.76 square miles (62,754.8 km^{2})). Maryland borders Pennsylvania to the north, Delaware to the northeast, the Atlantic Ocean to the east, and to the west and south by West Virginia and Virginia.

== Overview ==
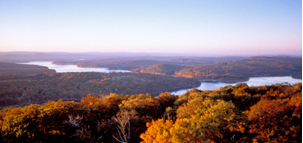
Western Maryland is known for its heavily forested mountains. A panoramic view of Deep Creek Lake and the surrounding Appalachian Mountains in Garrett County.

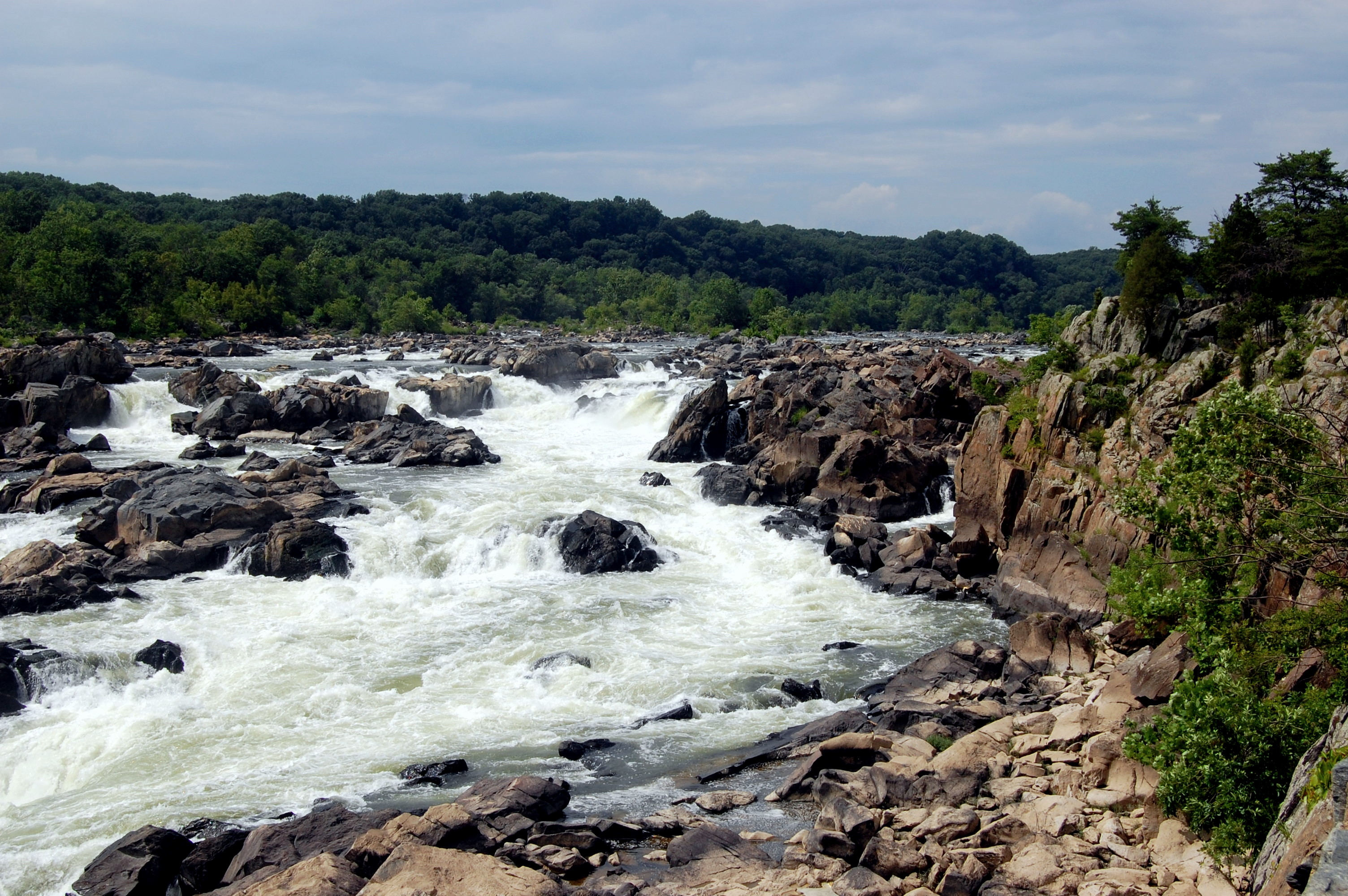
Great Falls on the Potomac River

Maryland possesses a variety of topography within its borders, contributing to its nickname America in Miniature. It ranges from sandy dunes dotted with seagrass in the east, to low marshlands teeming with wildlife and large bald cypress near the Chesapeake Bay, to gently rolling hills of oak forests in the Piedmont Region, and pine groves in the Maryland mountains to the west.

Maryland borders four states: it is bounded on its north by Pennsylvania, on its north and east by Delaware, on its east by the Atlantic Ocean, and on its south and west, across the Potomac River, by West Virginia and Virginia. The mid-portion of this latter border is interrupted by the District of Columbia, which sits on land that was originally part of Montgomery and Prince George's counties and including the town of Georgetown, Maryland. This land was ceded to the United States federal government in 1790 to form the District of Columbia. (The Commonwealth of Virginia gave land south of the Potomac, including the town of Alexandria, Virginia; however, Virginia retroceded its portion in 1846.) The Chesapeake Bay nearly bisects the state and the counties east of the bay are known collectively as the Eastern Shore.

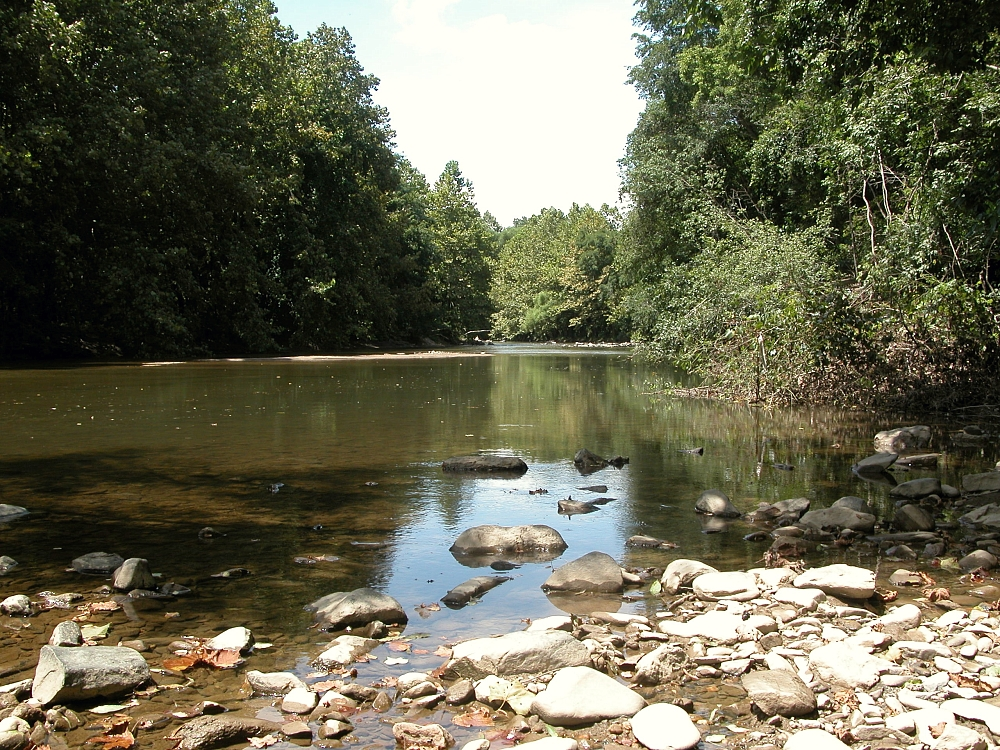
Typical freshwater river above the tidal zone. The Patapsco River includes the famous Thomas Viaduct and is part of the Patapsco Valley State Park. Later, the river forms Baltimore's Inner Harbor as it empties into the Chesapeake Bay.

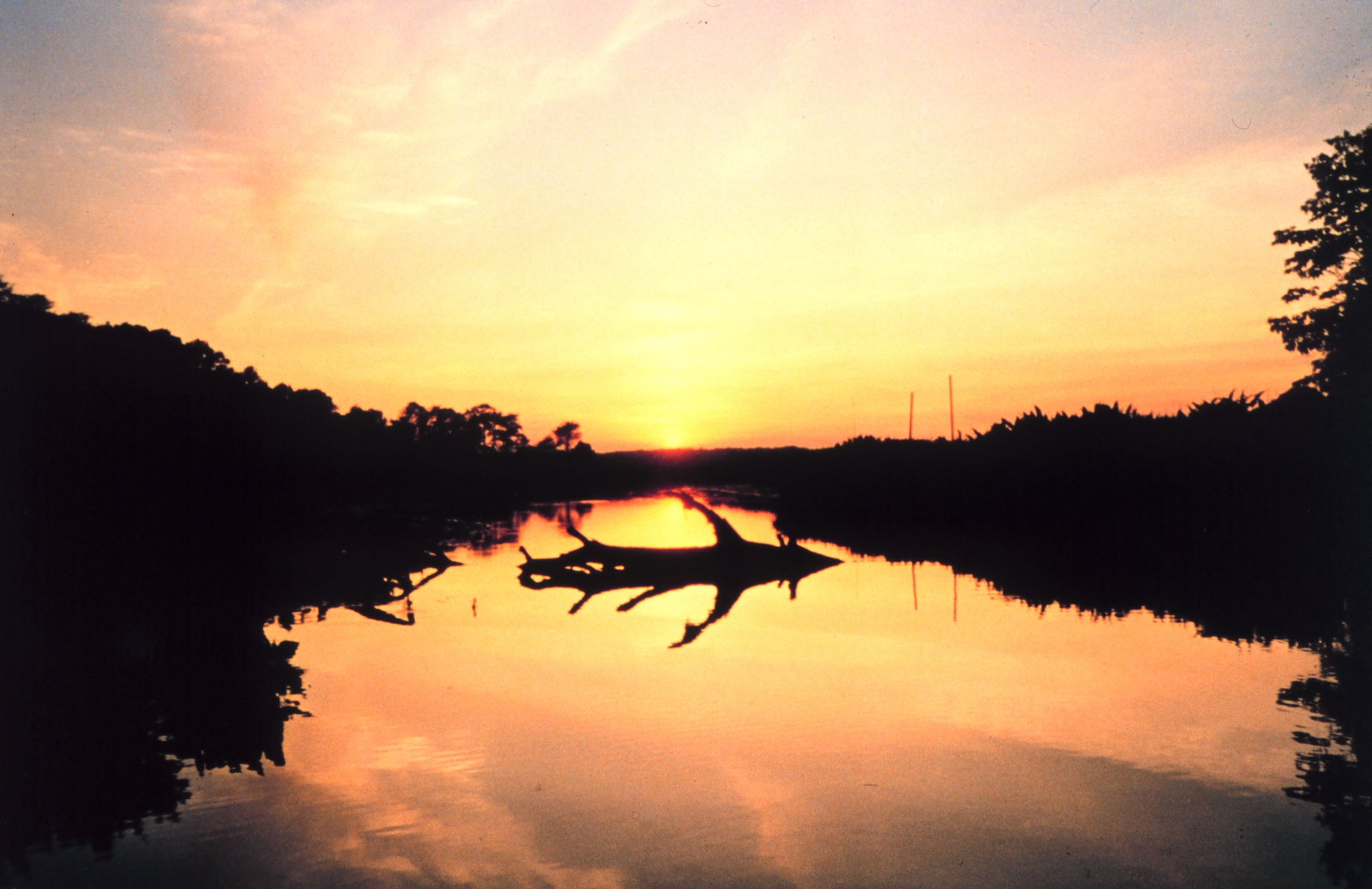
Typical brackish tidal river. Sunset over a marsh at Cardinal Cove on the Patuxent River.

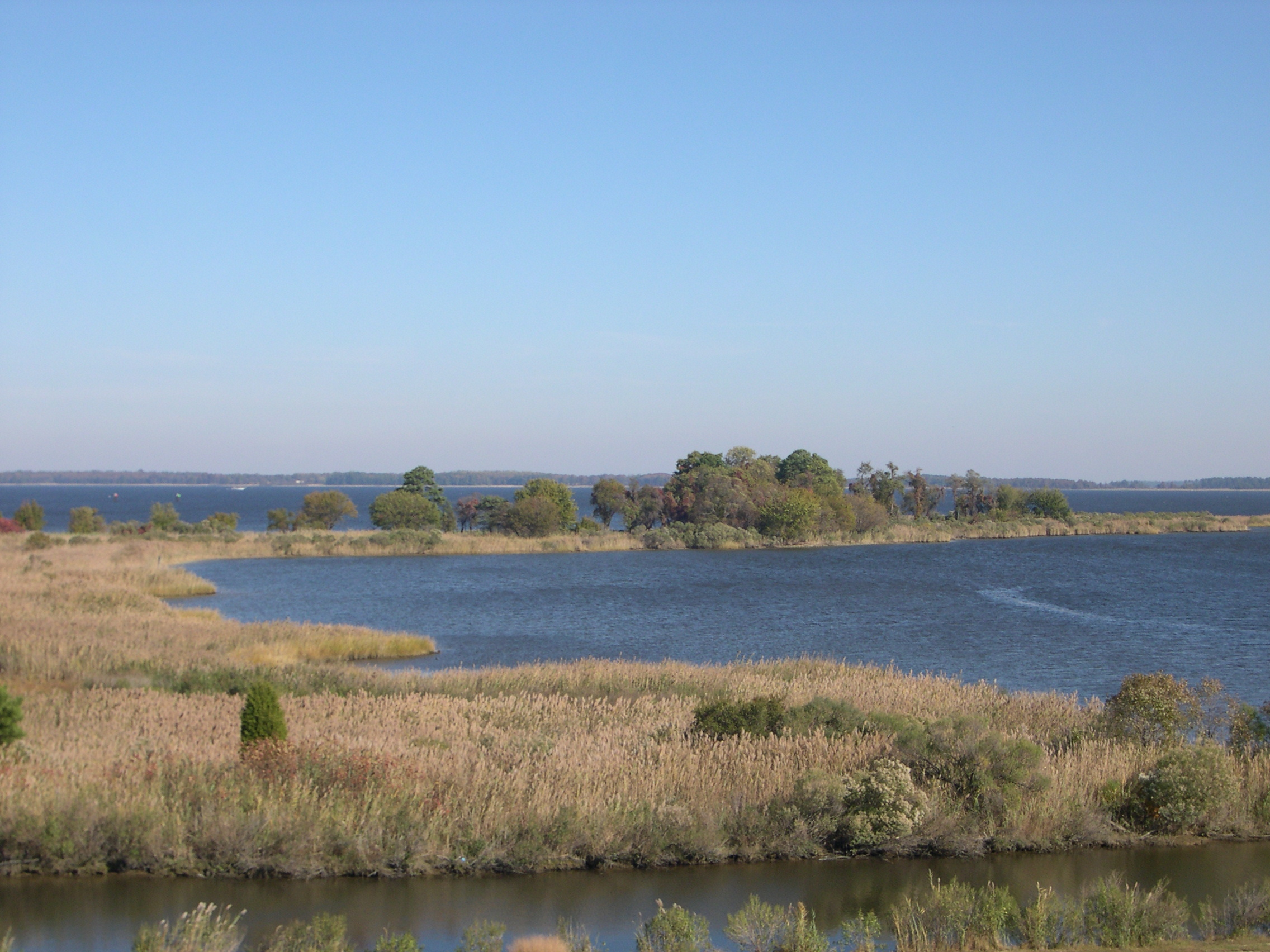
Tidal wetlands of the Chesapeake Bay, the largest estuary in the United States and the largest water feature in Maryland

Most of the state's waterways are part of the Chesapeake Bay watershed, with the exceptions of a tiny portion of extreme western Garrett County (drained by the Youghiogheny River as part of the watershed of the Mississippi River), the eastern half of Worcester County (which drains into Maryland's Atlantic coastal bays), and a small portion of the state's northeast corner (which drains into the Delaware River watershed). So prominent is the Chesapeake in Maryland's geography and economic life that there has been periodic agitation to change the state's official nickname to the "Bay State", a nickname that has been used by Massachusetts for decades.

The highest point in Maryland, with an elevation of 3,360 feet (1,020 m), is Hoye Crest on Backbone Mountain, in the southwest corner of Garrett County, near the border with West Virginia, and near the headwaters of the North Branch of the Potomac River. Close to the small town of Hancock, in western Maryland, about two-thirds of the way across the state, less than 2 miles (3.2 km) separates its borders, the Mason–Dixon line to the north, and the northwards-arching Potomac River to the south.

Portions of Maryland are included in various official and unofficial geographic regions. For example, the Delmarva Peninsula is composed of the Eastern Shore counties of Maryland, the entire state of Delaware, and the two counties that make up the Eastern Shore of Virginia, whereas the westernmost counties of Maryland are considered part of Appalachia. Much of the Baltimore–Washington corridor lies just south of the Piedmont in the Coastal Plain, though it straddles the border between the two regions.

== Geology ==
Earthquakes in Maryland are infrequent and small due to the state's distance from seismic/earthquake zones. The M5.8 Virginia earthquake in 2011 was felt moderately throughout Maryland. Buildings in the state are not well-designed for earthquakes and can suffer damage easily.

Maryland has no natural lakes, mostly due to the lack of glacial history in the area. All lakes in the state today were constructed, mostly via dams. Buckel's Bog is believed by geologists to have been a remnant of a former natural lake.

Maryland has shale formations containing natural gas, where fracking is theoretically possible.

== Wildlife ==
=== Flora ===
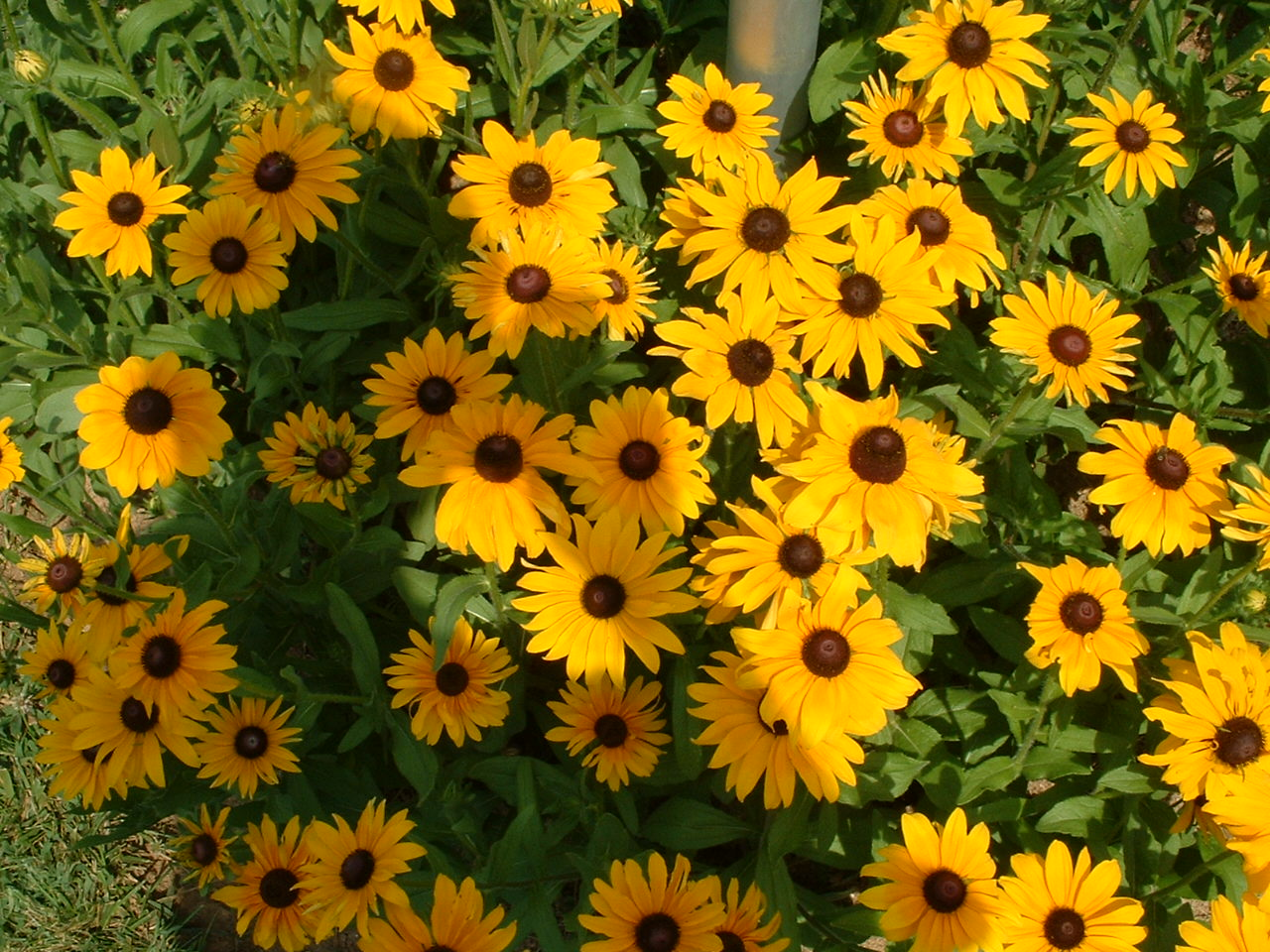
Black-eyed susans, the state flower, grow throughout much of the state.

As is typical of states on the East Coast, Maryland's plant life is abundant and healthy. A modest volume of annual precipitation helps to support many types of plants, including seagrass and various reeds at the smaller end of the spectrum to the gigantic Wye Oak, a huge example of white oak, the state tree, which can grow over 70 feet (21 m) tall.

Middle Atlantic coastal forests, typical of the southeastern Atlantic coastal plain, grow around Chesapeake Bay and on the Delmarva Peninsula. Moving west, a mixture of Northeastern coastal forests and Southeastern mixed forests cover the central part of the state. The Appalachian Mountains of western Maryland are home to Appalachian-Blue Ridge forests. These give way to Appalachian mixed mesophytic forests near the West Virginia border.

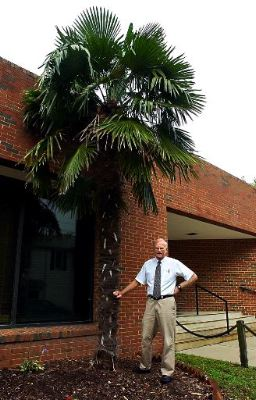
Mature Trachycarpus fortunei in Solomons, Maryland

Many foreign species are cultivated in the state, some as ornamentals, others as novelty species. Included among these are the crape myrtle, Italian cypress, southern magnolia, live oak in the warmer parts of the state, and even hardy palm trees in the warmer central and eastern parts of the state. USDA plant hardiness zones in the state range from Zones 5 and 6 in the extreme western part of the state to Zone 7 in the central part, and Zone 8 around the southern part of the coast, the bay area, and parts of metropolitan Baltimore. Invasive plant species, such as kudzu, tree of heaven, multiflora rose, and Japanese stiltgrass, stifle growth of endemic plant life. Maryland's state flower, the black-eyed susan, grows in abundance in wild flower groups throughout the state.

=== Fauna ===
The state harbors a considerable number of white-tailed deer, especially in the woody and mountainous west of the state, and overpopulation can become a problem. Mammals can be found ranging from the mountains in the west to the central areas and include black bears, bobcats, foxes, coyotes, raccoons, and otters.

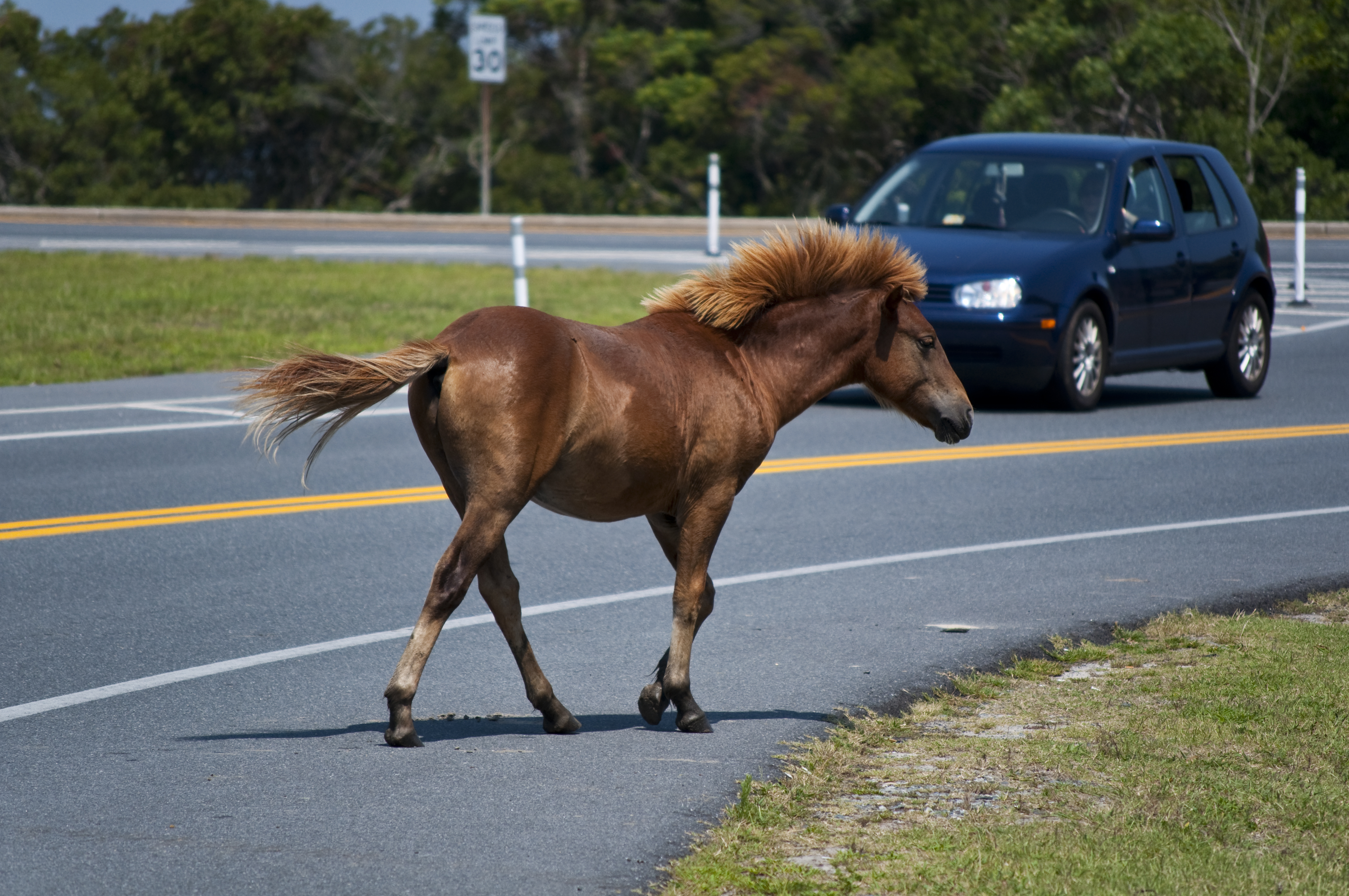
On Maryland's Atlantic coastal islands: A feral Chincoteague Pony on Assateague

There is a population of rare wild (feral) horses found on Assateague Island. They are believed to be descended from horses who escaped from Spanish galleon shipwrecks. Every year during the last week of July, they are captured and swim across a shallow bay for sale at Chincoteague, Virginia, a conservation technique which ensures the tiny island is not overrun by the horses. The ponies and their sale were popularized by the children's book, Misty of Chincoteague.

The purebred Chesapeake Bay Retriever dog was bred specifically for water sports, hunting and search and rescue in the Chesapeake area. In 1878, the Chesapeake Bay Retriever was the first individual retriever breed recognized by the American Kennel Club. and was later adopted by the University of Maryland, Baltimore County as their mascot.

Maryland's reptile and amphibian population includes the diamondback terrapin turtle, which was adopted as the mascot of University of Maryland, College Park, as well as the threatened Eastern box turtle. The state is part of the territory of the Baltimore oriole, which is the official state bird and mascot of the MLB team the Baltimore Orioles. Aside from the oriole, 435 other species of birds have been reported from Maryland.

The state insect is the Baltimore checkerspot butterfly, although it is not as common in Maryland as it is in the southern edge of its range.

== Environment ==
Maryland joined with neighboring states during the end of the 20th century to improve the health of the Chesapeake Bay. The bay's aquatic life and seafood industry have been threatened by development and by fertilizer and livestock waste entering the bay.

In 2007, Forbes.com rated Maryland as the fifth "Greenest" state in the country, behind three of the Pacific States and Vermont. Maryland ranks 40th in total energy consumption nationwide, and it managed less toxic waste per capita than all but six states in 2005. In April 2007, Maryland joined the Regional Greenhouse Gas Initiative (RGGI)—a regional initiative, formed by all the Northeastern states, Washington, D.C., and three Canadian provinces, to reduce greenhouse gas emissions. In March 2017, Maryland became the first state with proven gas reserves to ban fracking by passing a law against it. Vermont has such a law, but no shale gas, and New York has such a ban, though it was made by executive order.

== Climate ==
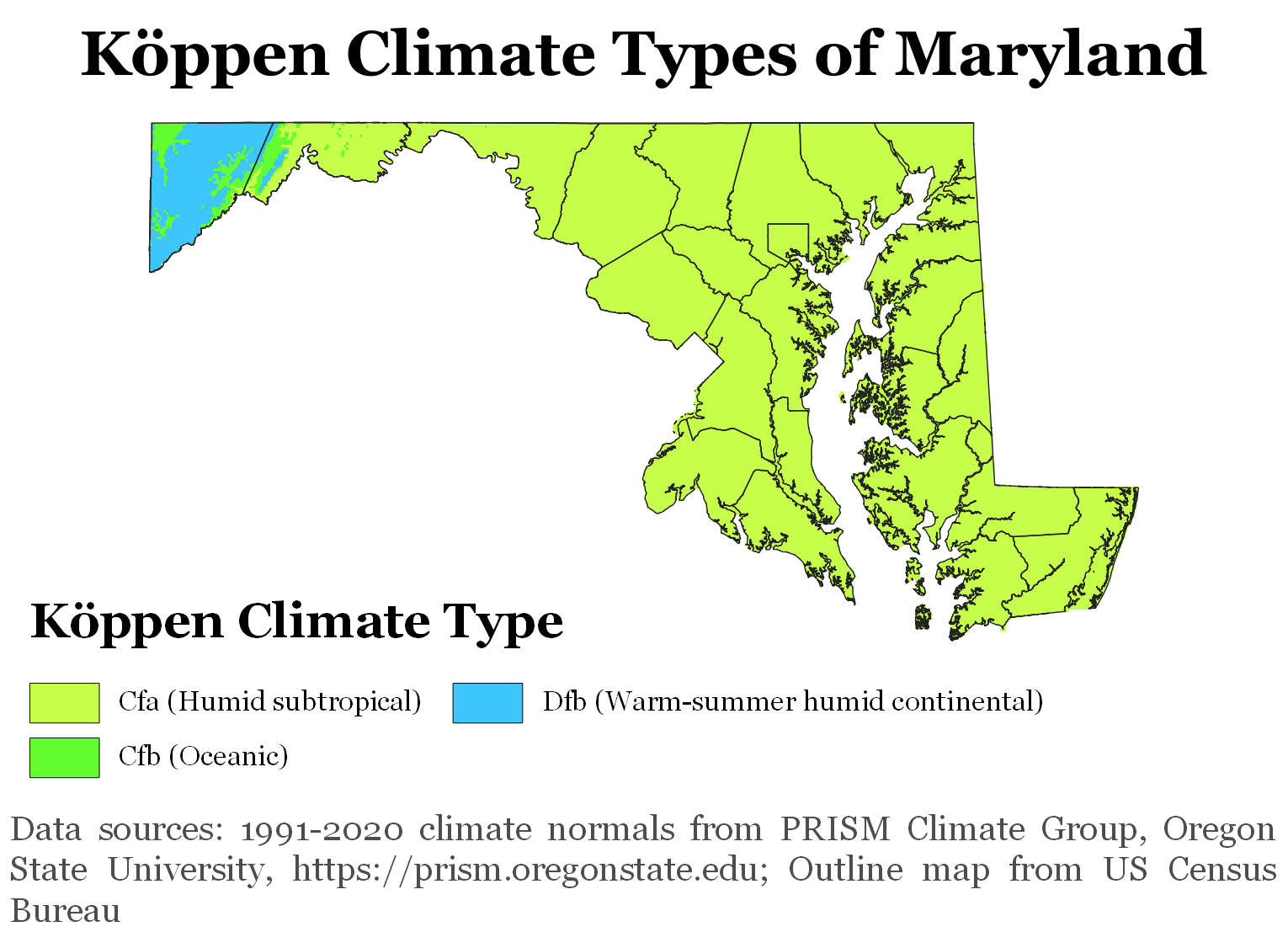
Köppen climate types of Maryland, using 1991–2020 climate normals.

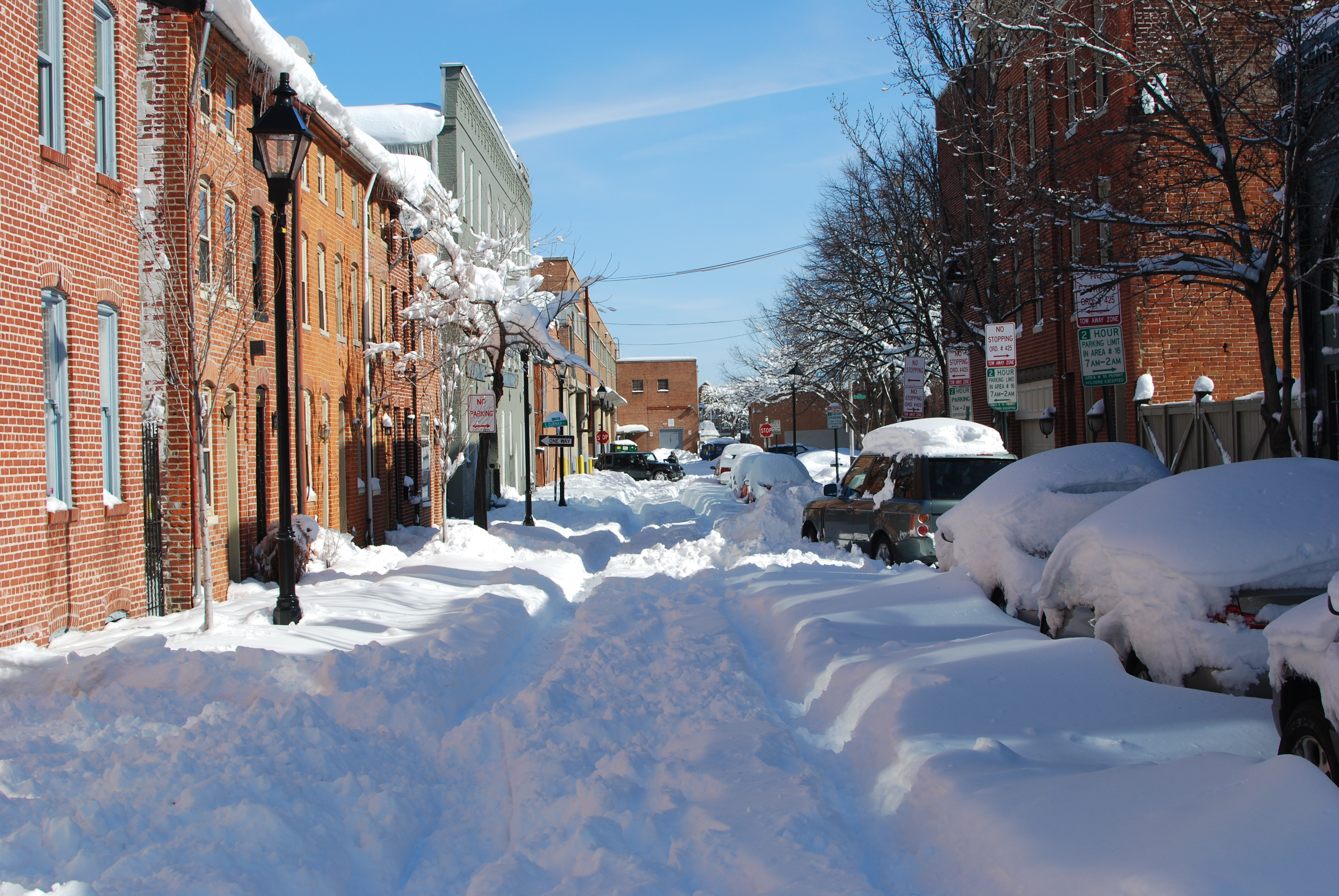
Winter in Baltimore, Lancaster Street, Fells Point

Maryland has a wide array of climates, due to local variances in elevation, proximity to water, and protection from colder weather due to downslope winds.

The eastern half of Maryland—which includes the cities of Ocean City, Salisbury, Annapolis, and the southern and eastern suburbs of Washington, D.C., and Baltimore—lies on the Atlantic Coastal Plain, with flat topography and sandy or muddy soil. This region has a humid subtropical climate (Köppen Cfa), with hot, humid summers and a cool to cold winter; it falls under USDA Hardiness zone 8a.

The Piedmont region—which includes northern and western greater Baltimore, Westminster, Gaithersburg, Frederick, and Hagerstown—has average seasonal snowfall totals generally exceeding 20 inches (51 cm), and, as part of USDA Hardiness zones 7b and 7a, temperatures below 10 °F (−12 °C) are less rare. From the Cumberland Valley on westward, the climate begins to transition to a humid continental climate (Köppen Dfa).

In western Maryland, the higher elevations of Allegany and Garrett counties—including the cities of Cumberland, Frostburg, and Oakland—display more characteristics of the humid continental zone, due in part to elevation. They fall under USDA Hardiness zones 6b and below.

Precipitation in the state is characteristic of the East Coast. Annual rainfall ranges from 35 to 45 inches (890 to 1,140 mm) with more in higher elevations. Nearly every part of Maryland receives 3.5–4.5 inches (89–114 mm) per month of rain. Average annual snowfall varies from 9 inches (23 cm) in the coastal areas to over 100 inches (250 cm) in the western mountains of the state.

Because of its location near the Atlantic Coast, Maryland is somewhat vulnerable to tropical cyclones, although the Delmarva Peninsula and the outer banks of North Carolina provide a large buffer, such that strikes from major hurricanes (category 3 or above) occur infrequently. More often, Maryland gets the remnants of a tropical system that has already come ashore and released most of its energy. Maryland averages around 30–40 days of thunderstorms and six tornado strikes annually.

=== Climate data ===
Monthly average high and low temperatures for various Maryland cities and landmarks (covering breadth and width of the state)
City	Jan	Feb	Mar	Apr	May	Jun	Jul	Aug	Sep	Oct	Nov	Dec
Oakland	34 °F (1 °C); 16 °F (−9 °C)	38 °F (3 °C); 17 °F (−8 °C)	48 °F (9 °C); 25 °F (−4 °C)	59 °F (15 °C); 34 °F (1 °C)	68 °F (20 °C); 45 °F (7 °C)	75 °F (24 °C); 53 °F (12 °C)	79 °F (26 °C); 58 °F (14 °C)	78 °F (26 °C); 56 °F (13 °C)	71 °F (22 °C); 49 °F (9 °C)	62 °F (17 °C); 37 °F (3 °C)	50 °F (10 °C); 28 °F (−2 °C)	39 °F (4 °C); 21 °F (−6 °C)
Cumberland	41 °F (5 °C); 22 °F (−6 °C)	46 °F (8 °C); 24 °F (−4 °C)	56 °F (13 °C); 32 °F (0 °C)	68 °F (20 °C); 41 °F (5 °C)	77 °F (25 °C); 51 °F (11 °C)	85 °F (29 °C); 60 °F (16 °C)	89 °F (32 °C); 65 °F (18 °C)	87 °F (31 °C); 63 °F (17 °C)	80 °F (27 °C); 55 °F (13 °C)	69 °F (21 °C); 43 °F (6 °C)	57 °F (14 °C); 34 °F (1 °C)	45 °F (7 °C); 26 °F (−3 °C)
Hagerstown	39 °F (4 °C); 22 °F (−6 °C)	42 °F (6 °C); 23 °F (−5 °C)	52 °F (11 °C); 30 °F (−1 °C)	63 °F (17 °C); 39 °F (4 °C)	72 °F (22 °C); 50 °F (10 °C)	81 °F (27 °C); 59 °F (15 °C)	85 °F (29 °C); 64 °F (18 °C)	83 °F (28 °C); 62 °F (17 °C)	76 °F (24 °C); 54 °F (12 °C)	65 °F (18 °C); 43 °F (6 °C)	54 °F (12 °C); 34 °F (1 °C)	43 °F (6 °C); 26 °F (−3 °C)
Frederick	42 °F (6 °C); 26 °F (−3 °C)	47 °F (8 °C); 28 °F (−2 °C)	56 °F (13 °C); 35 °F (2 °C)	68 °F (20 °C); 45 °F (7 °C)	77 °F (25 °C); 54 °F (12 °C)	85 °F (29 °C); 63 °F (17 °C)	89 °F (32 °C); 68 °F (20 °C)	87 °F (31 °C); 66 °F (19 °C)	80 °F (27 °C); 59 °F (15 °C)	68 °F (20 °C); 47 °F (8 °C)	56 °F (13 °C); 38 °F (3 °C)	45 °F (7 °C); 30 °F (−1 °C)
Baltimore	42 °F (6 °C); 29 °F (−2 °C)	46 °F (8 °C); 31 °F (−1 °C)	54 °F (12 °C); 39 °F (4 °C)	65 °F (18 °C); 48 °F (9 °C)	75 °F (24 °C); 57 °F (14 °C)	85 °F (29 °C); 67 °F (19 °C)	90 °F (32 °C); 72 °F (22 °C)	87 °F (31 °C); 71 °F (22 °C)	80 °F (27 °C); 64 °F (18 °C)	68 °F (20 °C); 52 °F (11 °C)	58 °F (14 °C); 43 °F (6 °C)	46 °F (8 °C); 33 °F (1 °C)
Elkton	42 °F (6 °C); 24 °F (−4 °C)	46 °F (8 °C); 26 °F (−3 °C)	55 °F (13 °C); 32 °F (0 °C)	67 °F (19 °C); 42 °F (6 °C)	76 °F (24 °C); 51 °F (11 °C)	85 °F (29 °C); 61 °F (16 °C)	88 °F (31 °C); 66 °F (19 °C)	87 °F (31 °C); 65 °F (18 °C)	80 °F (27 °C); 57 °F (14 °C)	69 °F (21 °C); 45 °F (7 °C)	58 °F (14 °C); 36 °F (2 °C)	46 °F (8 °C); 28 °F (−2 °C)
Ocean City	45 °F (7 °C); 28 °F (−2 °C)	46 °F (8 °C); 29 °F (−2 °C)	53 °F (12 °C); 35 °F (2 °C)	61 °F (16 °C); 44 °F (7 °C)	70 °F (21 °C); 53 °F (12 °C)	79 °F (26 °C); 63 °F (17 °C)	84 °F (29 °C); 68 °F (20 °C)	82 °F (28 °C); 67 °F (19 °C)	77 °F (25 °C); 60 °F (16 °C)	68 °F (20 °C); 51 °F (11 °C)	58 °F (14 °C); 39 °F (4 °C)	49 °F (9 °C); 32 °F (0 °C)
Waldorf	44 °F (7 °C); 26 °F (−3 °C)	49 °F (9 °C); 28 °F (−2 °C)	58 °F (14 °C); 35 °F (2 °C)	68 °F (20 °C); 43 °F (6 °C)	75 °F (24 °C); 53 °F (12 °C)	81 °F (27 °C); 62 °F (17 °C)	85 °F (29 °C); 67 °F (19 °C)	83 °F (28 °C); 65 °F (18 °C)	78 °F (26 °C); 59 °F (15 °C)	68 °F (20 °C); 47 °F (8 °C)	59 °F (15 °C); 38 °F (3 °C)	48 °F (9 °C); 30 °F (−1 °C)
Point Lookout State Park	47 °F (8 °C); 29 °F (−2 °C)	51 °F (11 °C); 31 °F (−1 °C)	60 °F (16 °C); 38 °F (3 °C)	70 °F (21 °C); 46 °F (8 °C)	78 °F (26 °C); 55 °F (13 °C)	86 °F (30 °C); 64 °F (18 °C)	89 °F (32 °C); 69 °F (21 °C)	87 °F (31 °C); 67 °F (19 °C)	81 °F (27 °C); 60 °F (16 °C)	71 °F (22 °C); 49 °F (9 °C)	61 °F (16 °C); 41 °F (5 °C)	50 °F (10 °C); 32 °F (0 °C)

Climate data for Baltimore (Baltimore/Washington International Airport) (1991−2020 normals, extremes 1872–present)
Month	Jan	Feb	Mar	Apr	May	Jun	Jul	Aug	Sep	Oct	Nov	Dec	Year
Record high °F (°C)	79 (26)	83 (28)	90 (32)	94 (34)	98 (37)	105 (41)	107 (42)	105 (41)	101 (38)	98 (37)	86 (30)	77 (25)	107 (42)
Mean daily maximum °F (°C)	43.2 (6.2)	46.4 (8.0)	54.8 (12.7)	66.5 (19.2)	75.5 (24.2)	84.4 (29.1)	88.8 (31.6)	86.5 (30.3)	79.7 (26.5)	68.3 (20.2)	57.3 (14.1)	47.5 (8.6)	66.6 (19.2)
Daily mean °F (°C)	34.3 (1.3)	36.6 (2.6)	44.3 (6.8)	55.0 (12.8)	64.4 (18.0)	73.5 (23.1)	78.3 (25.7)	76.2 (24.6)	69.2 (20.7)	57.4 (14.1)	46.9 (8.3)	38.6 (3.7)	56.2 (13.4)
Mean daily minimum °F (°C)	25.4 (−3.7)	26.9 (−2.8)	33.9 (1.1)	43.6 (6.4)	53.3 (11.8)	62.6 (17.0)	67.7 (19.8)	65.8 (18.8)	58.8 (14.9)	46.5 (8.1)	36.5 (2.5)	29.6 (−1.3)	45.9 (7.7)
Record low °F (°C)	−7 (−22)	−7 (−22)	4 (−16)	15 (−9)	32 (0)	40 (4)	50 (10)	45 (7)	35 (2)	25 (−4)	12 (−11)	−3 (−19)	−7 (−22)
Average precipitation inches (mm)	3.08 (78)	2.90 (74)	4.01 (102)	3.39 (86)	3.85 (98)	3.98 (101)	4.48 (114)	4.09 (104)	4.44 (113)	3.94 (100)	3.13 (80)	3.71 (94)	45.00 (1,143)
Average snowfall inches (cm)	6.4 (16)	7.5 (19)	2.8 (7.1)	0.0 (0.0)	0.0 (0.0)	0.0 (0.0)	0.0 (0.0)	0.0 (0.0)	0.0 (0.0)	0.0 (0.0)	0.1 (0.25)	2.5 (6.4)	19.3 (49)
Average precipitation days (≥ 0.01 in)	10.1	9.3	11.0	11.2	11.9	11.3	10.4	9.6	9.1	8.6	8.5	10.3	121.3
Average snowy days (≥ 0.1 in)	2.8	2.9	1.5	0.1	0.0	0.0	0.0	0.0	0.0	0.0	0.2	1.5	9.0
Average relative humidity (%)	63.2	61.3	59.2	58.9	66.1	68.4	69.1	71.1	71.3	69.5	66.5	65.5	65.8
Mean monthly sunshine hours	155.4	164.0	215.0	230.7	254.5	277.3	290.1	264.4	221.8	205.5	158.5	144.5	2,581.7
Percentage possible sunshine	51	54	58	58	57	62	64	62	59	59	52	49	58
Source: NOAA

Sea temperature data for Baltimore
Month	Jan	Feb	Mar	Apr	May	Jun	Jul	Aug	Sep	Oct	Nov	Dec	Year
Average sea temperature °F (°C)	46.0 (7.8)	44.4 (6.9)	45.1 (7.3)	50.4 (10.2)	55.9 (13.3)	68.2 (20.1)	75.6 (24.2)	77.4 (25.2)	73.4 (23.0)	66.0 (18.9)	57.2 (14.0)	50.7 (10.4)	59.2 (15.1)
Mean daily daylight hours	10.0	11.0	12.0	13.0	14.0	15.0	15.0	14.0	12.0	11.0	10.0	9.0	12.2
Source: Weather Atlas

== See also ==
- Geography of Virginia
- List of islands of Maryland
- List of rivers of Maryland
- Chesapeake Bay
- Baltimore
