= Alta, West Virginia =

Alta, West Virginia may refer to:

- Alta, Fayette County, West Virginia, an unincorporated community in Fayette County, West Virginia
- Alta, Greenbrier County, West Virginia, an unincorporated community in Greenbrier County, West Virginia
