= Chantecler =

Chantecler may refer to:

- Chantecler, the rooster in the epic tale of Reynard
- Chantecler (chicken), a breed of chicken
- Chantecler (play), a play by Edmond Rostand
- Chantecler (record label), a Brazilian subsidiary of Warner Music Group
- Chantecler (Luxury jewelry) a luxury jewelry brand founded in 1947, originally from Capri-Italy
- Ski Chantecler, a ski station in the Laurentians of Quebec in Canada near Montreal
- Le Chantecler, a former ski resort in the Laurentians of Quebec in Canada near Montreal, see List of former ski areas of Quebec

== See also ==
- Chanticleer (disambiguation)
