= Stanton's Mill =

Historic district in Maryland, United States

- U.S. National Register of Historic Places
- U.S. Historic district
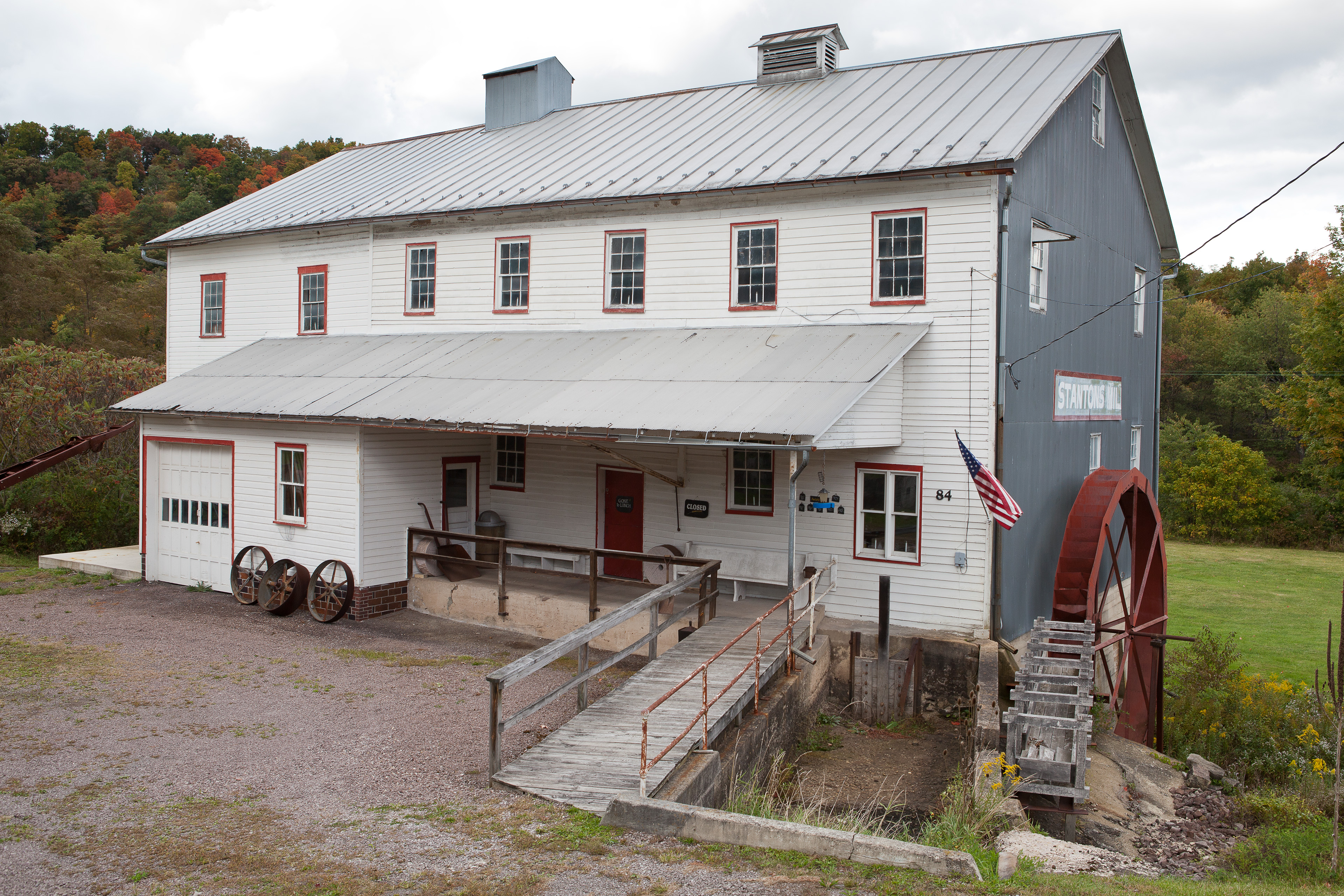

- Location within Maryland Location within the United States
- Location: East of Grantsville on U.S. Route 40, Grantsville, Maryland
- Coordinates: 39°41′46″N 79°8′24″W
- Area: 6 acres (2.4 ha)
- Built: 1797
- NRHP reference No.: 83002949
- Added to NRHP: January 17, 1983

Stanton's Mill is a historic grist mill complex located at Grantsville, Garrett County, Maryland, consisting of five interrelated buildings and structures. The Stanton's Mill building dates from about 1797. It is two stories and constructed of heavy timber frame with a gable roof; an addition was constructed in 1890. The complex includes a stone-faced, mid-19th-century timber crib dam and raceway, natural earthen tailrace, and a small, single-span stone arch bridge, dating to 1813, constructed as part of the National Road. Also on the property is a frame storage building, constructed about 1900.

It was listed on the National Register of Historic Places in 1983.

The mill is still operational and is located next to the Casselman River Bridge State Park.

== See also ==
- Spruce Forest Artisan Village
