= Arth (disambiguation) =

Arth is a village in Switzerland.

Arth may also refer to:

== People ==
- Jeanne Arth (born 1935), tennis player
- Tom Arth (born 1981), American football coach and former player

== Other ==
- Arth (film), 1982 Indian film by Mahesh Bhatt
  - Arth - The Destination, 2017 Pakistani film by Shaan Shahid, remake of the Indian film
- Artham, 1988 Indian film
- Arth-Goldau railway station, in Switzerland
- Dyffryn Arth, community in Wales
- River Arth, in Wales

== See also ==
- Anth (disambiguation)
- Arta (disambiguation)
- Artha, Indian philosophical term
  - Arthashastra, ancient Indian treatise
