= Altas =

Altas may refer to:

- Perpetual Altas, a Philippine sports team
- Altaş, Ardahan, a village in Ardahan Province, Turkey
- Altaş, Afşin, a village in Afşin District, Kahramanmaraş Province, Turkey

== See also ==
- Altass, a village in Scotland
- Alta (disambiguation)
- Atlas (disambiguation)
