= Grantsville, Maryland =

- Town
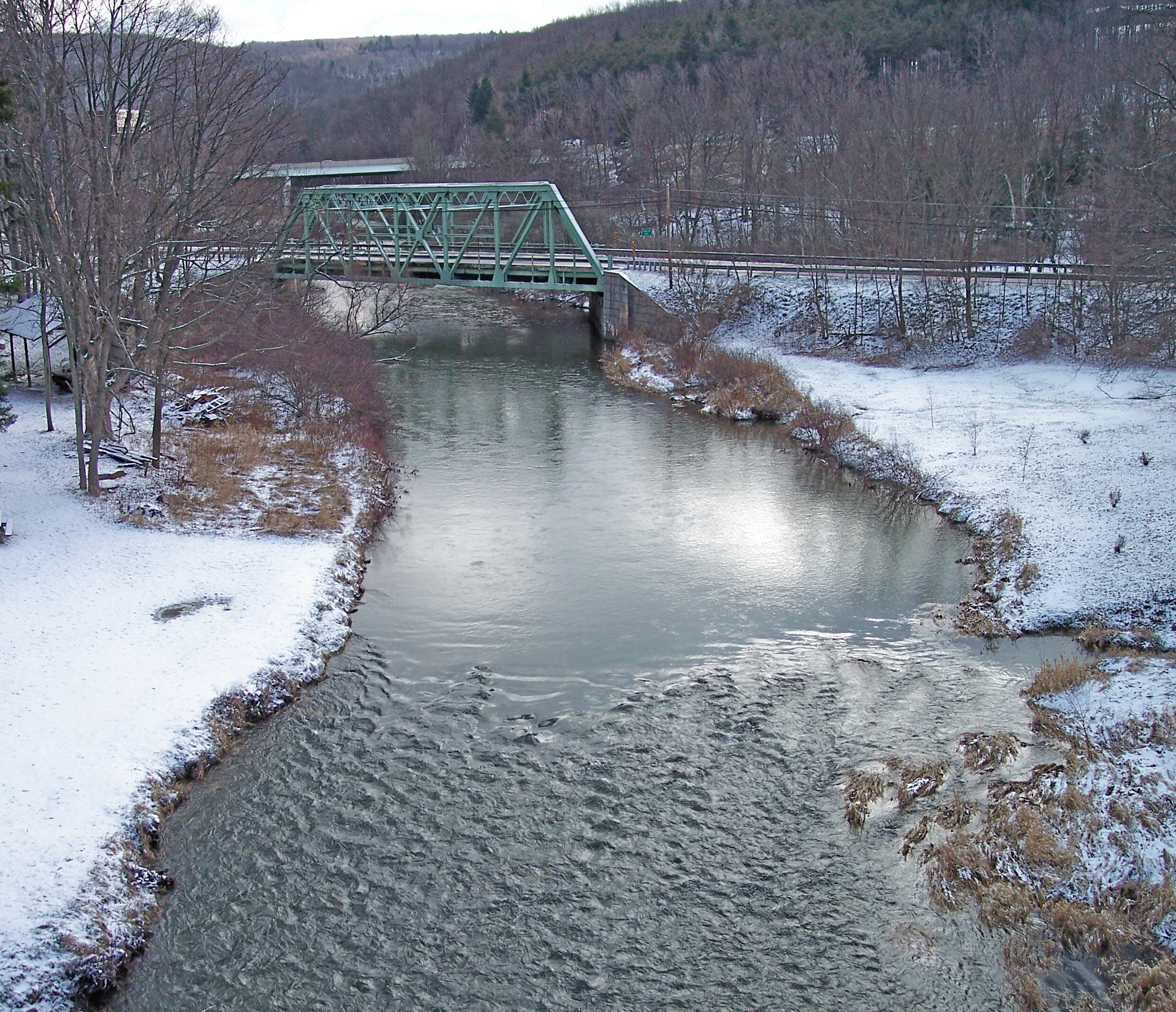
- The Casselman River in Casselman River Bridge State Park near Grantsville, Maryland

- Seal

- Location of Grantsville, Maryland
- Coordinates: 39°41′49″N 79°09′10″W
- Country: United States
- State: Maryland
- County: Garrett
- Incorporated: 1864

Area
  - Total: 1.04 sq mi (2.69 km^{2})
  - Land: 1.04 sq mi (2.69 km^{2})
  - Water: 0 sq mi (0.00 km^{2})
- Elevation: 2,303 ft (702 m)

Population (2020)
  - Total: 968
  - Density: 933.5/sq mi (360.43/km^{2})
- Time zone: UTC-5 (Eastern (EST))
  - Summer (DST): UTC-4 (EDT)
- ZIP code: 21536
- Area codes: 301, 240
- FIPS code: 24-34525
- GNIS feature ID: 2390215
- Website: www.visitgrantsville.com

Grantsville is a town in the northern part of Garrett County, Maryland, United States, near the Pennsylvania border. The population was 968 as of the 2020 census.

== History ==
Grantsville, half a mile west of the Casselman River, began as a small Amish and Mennonite settlement, called Tomlinson's or Little Crossing, along Braddock Road, which wound westward from Cumberland over Negro Mountain. Later a new village flourished as a stop along the nearby National Road, U.S. Route 40. From 1818, the national road carried hundreds of thousands of pioneers and settlers in stagecoaches and covered wagons. In the 1800s, an area just outside Grantsville (once known as Little Crossing but now marked by the intersection of Route 40 and River Road) was a major stop on the old National Pike. There is a "dip" in the road that travelers will not miss when they pass through Little Crossing on Route 40.

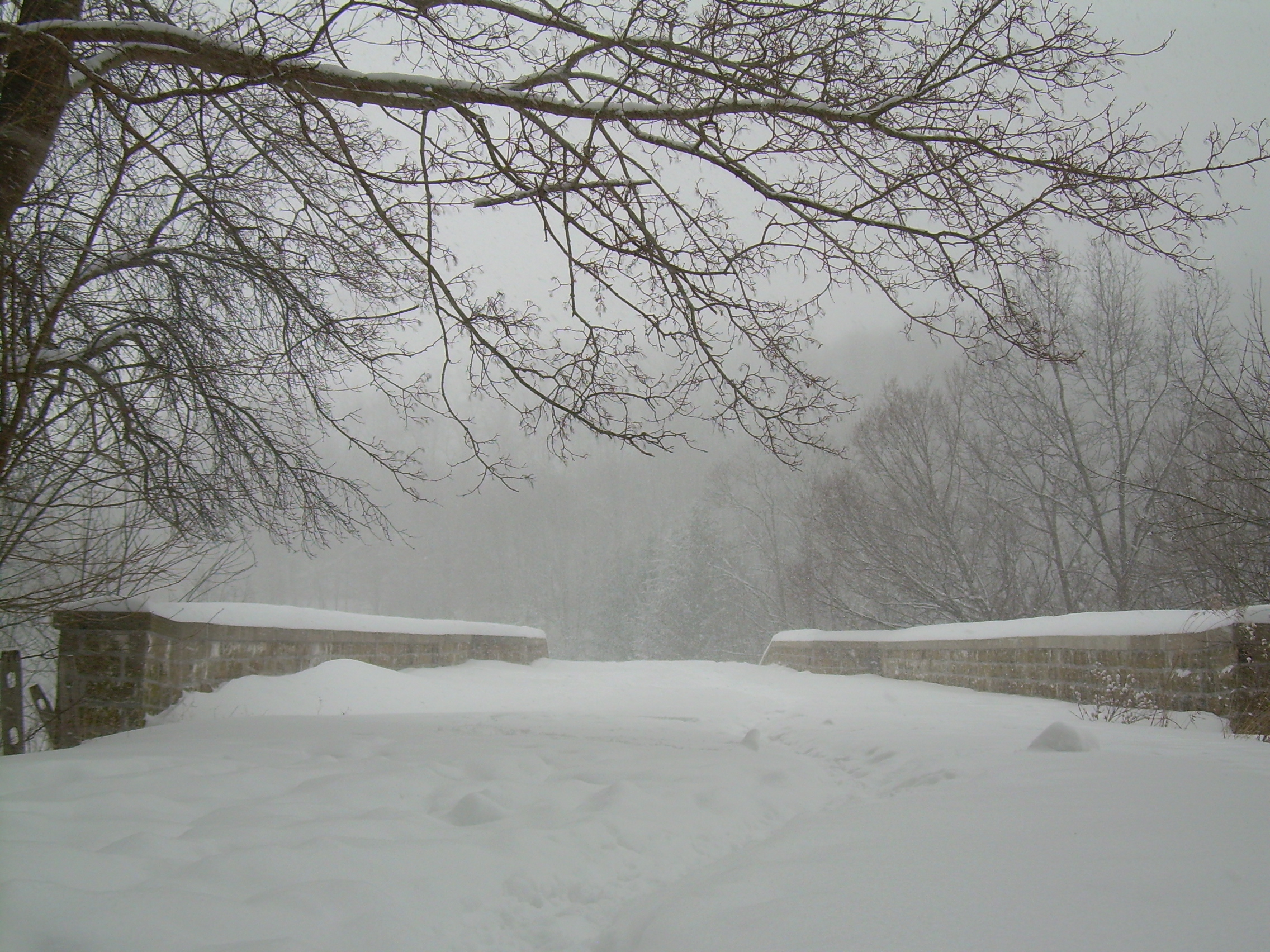
The Casselman Bridge

Signs mark the location of the post office and the blacksmith shop that stayed open all night to fix broken horseshoes. An 1879 article in Harper's Monthly described the wagons as "so numerous that the leaders of one team had their noses in the trough at the end of the next wagon ahead."

The Casselman Inn sits in the center of town, where it has provided food and lodging to travelers since 1824. A sign outside displays a replica 1842 stagecoach advertisement.

Near the Casselman Bridge, a historic stone arch bridge, are Penn Alps Restaurant and The Spruce Forest Artisan Village, which was founded in 1957 by Alta Schrock. Penn Alps Restaurant is housed in the last log hospitality house on the National Pike. It is situated between a 1797 gristmill and the Casselman Bridge, the longest single span of stone in America when built in 1813.

Spruce Forest Artisan Village, a part of the extended Penn Alps campus, has grown from a few cabins to some 12 log and frame structures of early vintage, two of which date to the Revolutionary War Period. Most of these provide studio space for artisans. Artisans work in various media, including bird carving, stained glass, basket making, hand-loom weaving, and hand-thrown pottery.

== Transportation ==
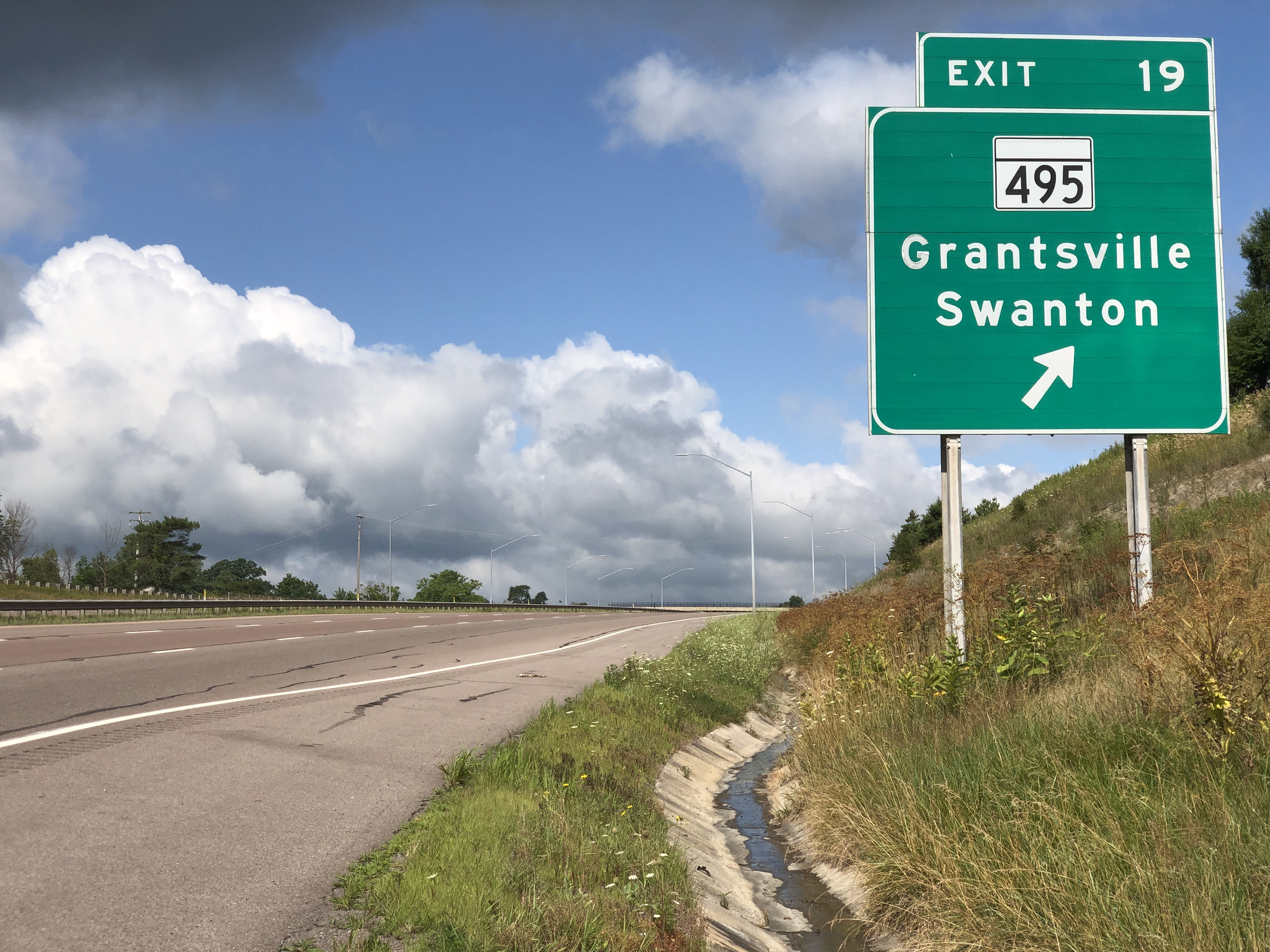
I-68/US 40 westbound and US 219 southbound at the exit for MD 495 in Grantsville

The main mode of transportation to Grantsville is by road. Interstate 68, U.S. Route 40 and U.S. Route 219 all traverse Grantsville via the National Freeway, an east-west freeway traversing western Maryland and northern West Virginia. Direct access to Grantsville is provided by an interchange with Maryland Route 495. U.S. Route 40 Alternate and Maryland Route 669 also serve Grantsville.

Grantsville was served by Greyhound bus until 2005. Since January 2011, it has been served by a Bayrunner Shuttle that originates in Grantsville and serves Frostburg, Cumberland, Allegany College of Maryland Cumberland Campus, Hancock, Hagerstown, Frederick Transit Center, Frederick Airport, BWI, BWI Amtrak Station, and Baltimore Greyhound Station.

== Geography ==
According to the United States Census Bureau, the town has a total area of 0.98 square miles (2.54 km^{2}), all land.

=== Climate ===
Grantsville has a humid continental climate under the Köppen climate classification, with warm summers and cold winters.

== Demographics ==
Historical population
Census	Pop.	Note	%±
1880	220		—
1900	175		—
1910	248		41.7%
1920	264		6.5%
1930	400		51.5%
1940	465		16.3%
1950	461		−0.9%
1960	446		−3.3%
1970	517		15.9%
1980	498		−3.7%
1990	505		1.4%
2000	619		22.6%
2010	766		23.7%
2020	968		26.4%
U.S. Decennial Census

In the 1960s the town had a stable population of approximately 400 individuals.

=== 2010 census ===
As of the census of 2010, there were 766 people, 350 households, and 213 families living in the town. The population density was 781.6 inhabitants per square mile (301.8/km^{2}). There were 397 housing units at an average density of 405.1 per square mile (156.4/km^{2}). The racial makeup of the town was 98.3% White, 0.1% African American, 0.4% Native American, and 1.2% from two or more races. Hispanic or Latino of any race were 1.6% of the population.

There were 350 households, of which 32.3% had children under the age of 18 living with them, 39.1% were married couples living together, 17.1% had a female householder with no husband present, 4.6% had a male householder with no wife present, and 39.1% were non-families. 35.7% of all households were made up of individuals, and 19.5% had someone living alone who was 65 years of age or older. The average household size was 2.19 and the average family size was 2.77.

The median age in the town was 38.4 years. 23.5% of residents were under the age of 18; 11.1% were between the ages of 18 and 24; 22.9% were from 25 to 44; 22.7% were from 45 to 64; and 19.8% were 65 years of age or older. The gender makeup of the town was 47.1% male and 52.9% female.

=== 2000 census ===
As of the census of 2000, there were 619 people, 278 households, and 177 families living in the town. The population density was 877.2 inhabitants per square mile (338.7/km^{2}). There were 298 housing units at an average density of 422.3 per square mile (163.1/km^{2}). The racial makeup of the town was 98.87% White, 0.48% African American, 0.32% Asian, and 0.32% from two or more races. Hispanic or Latino of any race were 0.48% of the population.

There were 278 households, out of which 30.6% had children under the age of 18 living with them, 43.5% were married couples living together, 14.7% had a female householder with no husband present, and 36.0% were non-families. 33.1% of all households were made up of individuals, and 12.2% had someone living alone who was 65 years of age or older. The average household size was 2.22 and the average family size was 2.74.

In the town, the population was spread out, with 24.4% under the age of 18, 8.2% from 18 to 24, 28.9% from 25 to 44, 24.1% from 45 to 64, and 14.4% who were 65 years of age or older. The median age was 37 years. For every 100 females, there were 86.4 males. For every 100 females age 18 and over, there were 85.0 males.

The median income for a household in the town was $27,778, and the median income for a family was $35,000. Males had a median income of $29,167 versus $21,250 for females. The per capita income for the town was $15,625. About 22.2% of families and 23.8% of the population were below the poverty line, including 38.0% of those under age 18 and 8.8% of those age 65 or over.

== Notable people ==
- George C. Edwards, Maryland state senator.
- Alta Schrock, Founder of Penn Alps, Springs Folk Festival, Springs Historical Society, Springs Museum.
