= Artas =

Artas may refer to:

== People ==
- Arta (Kamuia), the father of Kharaosta Kamuio, an ancient Asian people
- Artas of Messapia, king of the Messapians

== Locations ==
- Artas, Bethlehem, a Palestinian village in the West Bank
- Artas, Isère, a commune of the Isère département, in France
- Artas, South Dakota, a place in the United States

== Other ==
- American Reality Television Awards (The ARTAS), annual award for reality television in the United States
- ARTAS, Air Traffic Management (ATM) suRveillance Tracker And Server of EUROCONTROL
