= SilentHawk =

Hybrid-electric military motorcycle

SilentHawk is an all-wheel drive, hybrid-electric military bike designed for the United States Armed Forces. The bike, currently in its prototype stage, is being developed by Fairfax, Virginia-based contractor Logos Technologies with the aid of a Small Business Innovation Research (SBIR) award from the Defense Advanced Research Projects Agency (DARPA). According to Logos Technologies, the objective of the SBIR is to deliver a low-acoustic, highly maneuverable vehicle that can carry American Special Operations personnel and their equipment behind enemy lines, over difficult terrain, without being detected.

== Design and development ==
The SilentHawk design incorporates an all-electric RedShift MX dirt bike, produced by Alta Motors in Brisbane, California, and a multi-fuel genset originally developed by Logos Technologies for a separate unmanned parafoil project. By combining the Logos Technologies genset with the existing 5.8 kWh Alta Motors lithium-ion battery pack, designers contend that they can extend the total range of the bike and also allow it to recharge on the go.

The Alta Motors electric motorcycle of the core of the design weighs almost 270 pounds (122.47 kg). Added to that are the SilentHawk features, including a multi-fuel hybrid system, an advanced control system, and auxiliary charging systems. In addition, SilentHawk has an on-demand front-wheel drive hub motor, for improved handling on loose terrain and steep inclines. All this brings the weight of the SilentHawk prototype to 350 pounds (158.76 kg).

DARPA first awarded Logos Technologies a Phase 1 SIBR award in February 2014 to the assess the feasibility of developing a hybrid-electric bike. Following that study, the agency awarded a Phase 2 award in December 2014, which led to the development of the current prototype in October 2016.

== Features and capabilities ==
SilentHawk has both a silent electric and hybrid range extension mode. When running in its "silent" electric mode, SilentHawk operates at 55 decibels—slightly quieter than the average conversation, which can reach 60 decibels.

In its hybrid range extension mode, the bike reaches 75 decibels, or the noise level of a vacuum cleaner. SilentHawk can use its genset to recharge the Alta battery pack and any plugged-in electronic devices a rider might be carrying with him. SilentHawk's genset was also designed to burn whatever fuels might be found in the field, including propane, gasoline, diesel, JP5 and JP8 jet propellants.

It has up to 170 miles (273.59 km) total range (including 2 hours in quiet mode), but varies based on speed and terrain.

Its top speed can reach up to 80 mph (128.748 km/h).

The hard case saddlebags at the rear of the bike can carry 75 pounds (34 kg) of gear, and mounting points allow for the attaching of additional bags and gear.

== Further development ==
As part of a second Phase 2 SIBR, Logos Technologies is scheduled to produce two SilentHawk bikes for DARPA: an electric one with all-wheel drive and a reduced weight hybrid-electric system with a modular architecture. Company officials say that their plan to lessen the weight of the latter bike involves switching from a liquid-cooled engine to an air-cooled engine and removing SilentHawk's radiators.

== Other electric and hybrid-electric military bikes ==
In addition to SilentHawk, DARPA is sponsoring work on another hybrid-electric bike. That one is called Nightmare, and it is being developed by LSA Autonomy, in Westminster, Md. At 400 pounds, Nightmare weighs more than SilentHawk, but it also generates greater horsepower.

In 2013, U.S. Special Operation Forces also conducted testing of the MMX, an all-electric bike developed by Zero Motorcycles for the military. However, the problem with the MMX was that its battery needed to be recharged every 2 hours, and carrying a backup battery would come at the expense of other types of gear carried by the military rider.
