= Casselman Bridge =

State park in Maryland, United States

Casselman River Bridge State Park
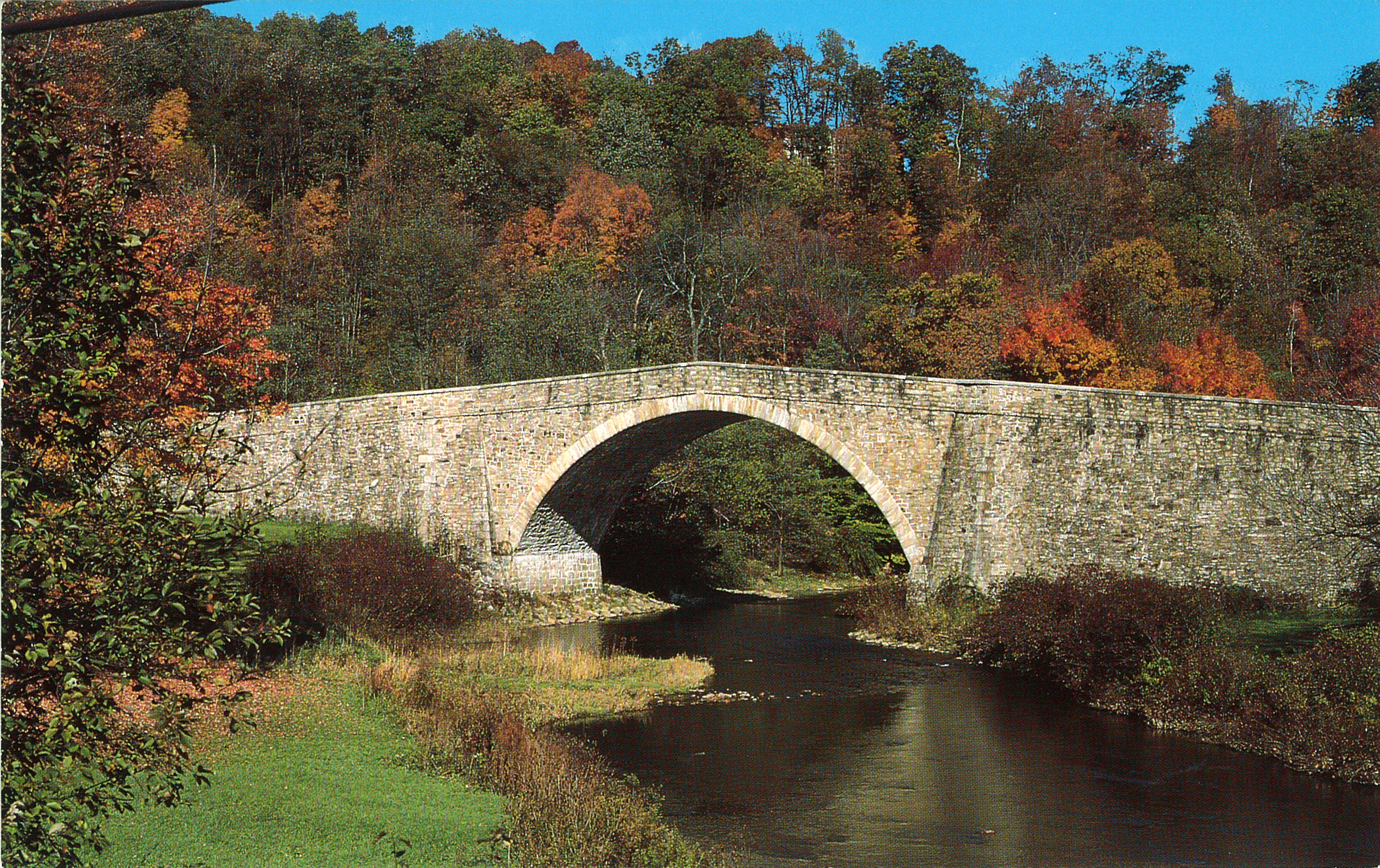
- The bridge's south aspect

- Location within Maryland Location within the United States
- Location: Garrett County, Maryland, United States
- Nearest town: Grantsville, Maryland
- Coordinates: 39°41′48″N 79°08′37″W
- Area: 4 acres (1.6 ha)
- Elevation: 2,113 ft (644 m)
- Established: 1957
- Administrator: Maryland Department of Natural Resources
- Status: Closed pending bridge repairs scheduled for 2024
- Designation: Maryland state park
- Website: Official website
- Casselman's Bridge, National Road
- U.S. National Register of Historic Places
- U.S. National Historic Landmark
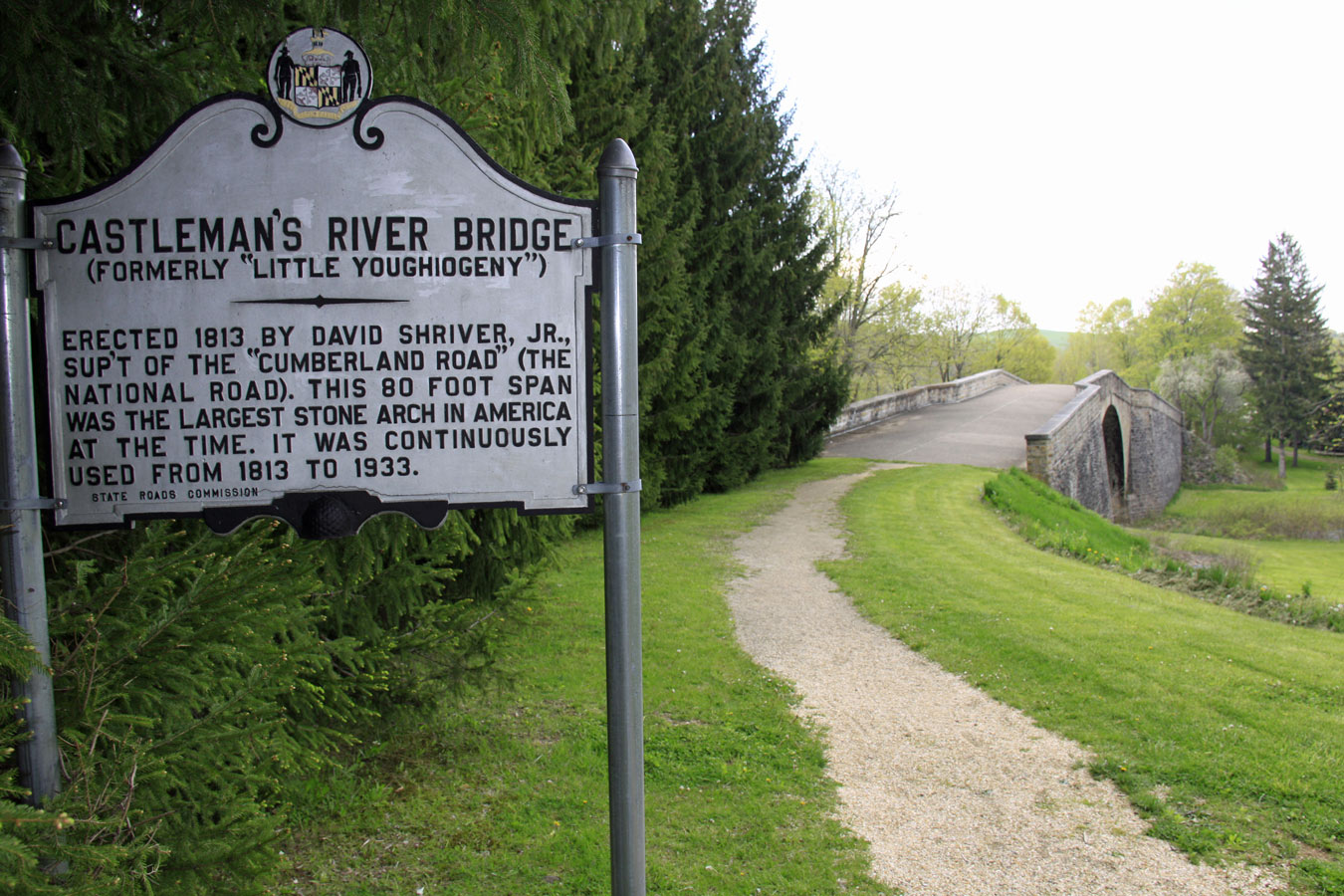
- Location: East of Grantsville on U.S. Route 40 Alternate, Grantsville, Maryland
- Area: < 1 acre
- Built: 1813–1814
- Architect: David Shriver Jr.
- NRHP reference No.: 66000391

Significant dates
- Added to NRHP: October 15, 1966
- Designated NHL: January 29, 1964

The Casselman Bridge is a historic transportation structure on the Casselman River, located immediately east of Grantsville in Garrett County, Maryland, and preserved by the state of Maryland as Casselman River Bridge State Park. The bridge was built in 1813–1814 as part of the National Road. Historic markers posted at each end read:

Erected 1813 by David Shriver Jr.,
Sup't of the "Cumberland Road" (The
National Road). This 80 foot span
was the largest stone arch in America
at the time. It was continuously
used from 1813 to 1933.

The structure, which has also been known as Casselmans Bridge, Castleman's Bridge, and Little Crossings Bridge, was declared a National Historic Landmark in 1964 and placed on the National Historic Register in 1966.

== History ==
The 354-foot-long (108 m) stone arch bridge spans 80 feet (24 m) with a 30-foot-high (9.1 m) arch and a roadway width of 48 feet (15 m). The bridge was constructed in 1813–1814 to aid in the westward movement through the frontier wilderness west of Cumberland, Maryland. The first wheeled vehicles crossed the bridge in 1815. As a "tidal wave" of western expansion followed the opening of the National Road, Casselman Bridge had heavy traffic that included 10-ton loads drawn by 12-horse teams. A small portion of the original National Road still exists at the approaches to the bridge.

The bridge was strengthened for motorized traffic in 1911 and continued in service as a highway until 1933, when a modern steel span was built nearby to serve what is now US Route 40 Alternate. In the 1940s and early 1950s, efforts were made to preserve the bridge when sections started to crumble. The bridge was closed to vehicles in 1953, partially restored by the state in the mid-1950s, and became a state park in 1957. Additional maintenance occurred in 1979, 1996, 2002, and 2012.

== Activities and amenities ==
In addition to walking over the historic bridge, the state park offers picnicking facilities and fishing in Casselman River. Historic structures to the east of the park include Stanton's Mill, which is listed on the National Register of Historic Places, and the restored log cabin craft shops of Spruce Forest Artisan Village.

== See also ==
- Buckel's Bog
- Maryland bridges documented on the Historic American Engineering Record
- Maryland bridges on the National Register of Historic Places
- List of National Historic Landmarks in Maryland
- National Register of Historic Places listings in Garrett County, Maryland
