= Altamont, British Columbia =

Neighbourhood of West Vancouver, British Columbia

Coordinates: 49.340°N 123.197°W

Altamont is a neighbourhood in British Columbia, Canada, on the North Shore of the Burrard Inlet, within the municipality of West Vancouver.

Named by John Fitzgerald Mahon ( - 1942) of Vancouver and London, who subdivided land here in 1913, after his brother-in-law's courtesy title, Earl of Altamont, the eldest son of the Marquess of Sligo, and brother of his wife, Lady Alice Mahon.

== See also ==
- Altamont (disambiguation)
