= The Altamont Enterprise =

- Type: Weekly newspaper
- Format: Broadsheet
- Owner(s): Melisa Hale-Spencer, Marcello Iaia
- Editor: Melissa Hale-Spencer
- Founded: July 26, 1884, published continuously to present.
- Headquarters: Altamont, Albany County, New York, United States
- Circulation: 4,345 (as of 2017)
- ISSN: 0890-6025
- OCLC number: 14354034
- Website: altamontenterprise.com

The Altamont Enterprise & Albany County Post is a weekly newspaper in Albany County, New York, founded in 1884. It covers the towns of Guilderland, New Scotland, Berne, Knox, Westerlo, and Rensselaerville, as well as the villages of Altamont and Voorheesville. It is the newspaper of record for the towns and villages it covers. The Altamont Enterprise has won numerous awards from the New York Press Association, along with consistently ranking as one of the top 10 newspapers in New York State. It has a circulation of 6,679. It is owned by former reporter and current editor Melissa Hale-Spencer and Marcello Iaia.
