= Atlanta Lawn Tennis Association =

The Atlanta Lawn Tennis Association (ALTA) is a non-profit organization founded in 1934 that is devoted to the development of tennis for recreation and physical fitness and is pledged to maintain the rules of play and high standard of sportsmanship based in Atlanta, Georgia.

== Function ==
The primary function of ALTA is scheduling league play for adult and junior teams in the five-county Atlanta metro area. A facility annexation program was developed in 1988 to include qualifying facilities in counties adjacent to the metro counties.

The Atlanta Lawn Tennis Association was first registered with the United States Lawn Tennis Association in 1934. The purpose of the organization at that time was to promote tennis tournaments and junior tennis development in the Atlanta area.

== Growth ==
ALTA started league play in 1971 with less than 1,000 members. It grew to almost 10,000 in 1975, 35,000 in 1982, over 51,000 in 1988 and 71,000 in 1992. Today, ALTA has approximately 80,000 members. It is the largest tennis-based community organization in the world.

== See also ==
- South America Tennis Confederation
