= Alta Walker =

American geologist (1942–2015)

A.S. Walker
- Born: April 28, 1942
- Died: August 1, 2015 (aged 73)
- Other name: Alta Sharon Walker
- Education: Syracuse University; University of Minnesota; Rice University
- Occupations: Geologist, geochemist

Alta Walker (April 28, 1942 – August 1, 2015) also known as A.S. Walker was an American geologist for the National Air and Space Museum, the US Geological Survey, and Department of the Interior, where she mapped the moons of Jupiter as well as the dark side of Earth’s Moon. Walker participated in a National Academy of Sciences scientific study group in 1980 in China. Her research on desertification was featured in American Scientist with her article, “Deserts of China.”

According to her obituary, she was one of the first female Americans to be an astronaut candidate.

Walker authored several books on deserts, geology and resources between 1981 and 2000<, was a contributing writer of the book Geomorphology from Space and co-authored Rocks and War: Geology and the Civil War Campaign of Second Manassas with her partner E-An Zen.

== Early life and education ==
Walker was from Ogdensburg, New York and her parents were William and Kathleen Walker and she graduated from Ogdensburg Free Academy in 1960. She went on to earn a Bachelor of Arts in English from Syracuse University, a Master of Arts in Earth Science from the University of Minnesota and a Doctor of Philosophy in Geochemistry from Rice University. Her doctoral dissertation was titled "Inert Gas Investigations of Five Apollo 11 and 12 Breccias and of an Apollo 17 Soil Sample".
