= Altamont, South Carolina =

Coordinates: 34.9410°N 82.4103°W

Altamont was an unincorporated community in Greenville County, South Carolina. Its summer post office operated from 1896 to 1915.

== Sources ==
- Journal of the American Philatelist, published monthly. State College, Pennsylvania. Use form US-T154/MMYYYY/p#. 072000/p648
- Altamont, South Carolina. Geographic Names Information System, U.S. Geological Survey.
