= Alta Schrock =

Biology professor and community activist

- Born: Alta Elizabeth Schrock; April 3, 1911; Grantsville, Maryland
- Died: November 7, 2001 (aged 90); Cumberland, Maryland
- Education: University of Pittsburgh
- Occupations: Biologist and community activist

Alta Elizabeth Schrock (April 3, 1911 – November 7, 2001) was an American biology professor and community activist in Western Maryland who was the first Mennonite woman in the United States to earn a Ph.D.

== Early life ==
Schrock was born on April 3, 1911, on Strawberry Hill Farm, near Grantsville, Maryland, the oldest of eight children.

== Education ==
In her childhood and teenage years, poor health prevented Alta Schrock from attending school. During this period, she studied plants in the woods on her own. When she was nearly fifteen, she returned to school to continue her formal education. She graduated from high school in Salisbury, Pennsylvania, and earned an associate degree in biology from Waynesburg College. She did graduate work at the University of Cincinnati, Oberlin College and Kent State University, and received a Ph.D. in biology from the University of Pittsburgh in 1944, the first Mennonite woman in America to receive her doctorate.

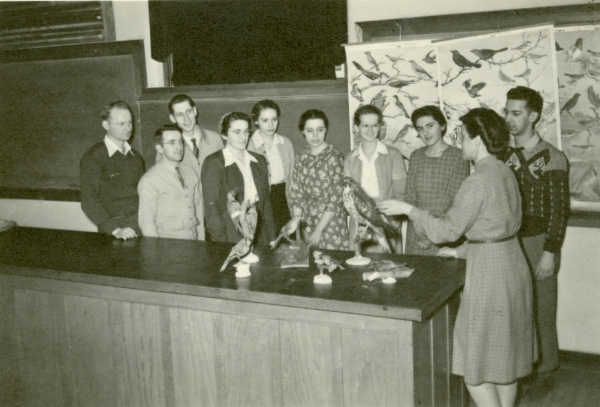
Schrock leading the Audubon Club at Goshen College

== Career ==
Schrock was on the faculty at American University (1944–46), Goshen College (1946-57), and Frostburg State University (1960–77). At Goshen, Schrock taught biology and was a faculty sponsor for the college's Audubon Society chapter.

In 1957, Schrock left her teaching position at Goshen College to return home to Western Maryland to found the Springs Historical Society, the Penn Alps Center, and the Spruce Forest Artisan Village, dedicated to preserving the heritage, folk art, and craft-work of the region. Schrock built Penn Alps into a tourist attraction, with an inn, restaurant, museum and craft shop where visitors could watch local artisans work and buy their products. Penn Alps held an annual Summerfest, drawing about a thousand people a day by the 1980s.

== Recognition ==
Schrock was inducted into the Maryland Women's Hall of Fame in 1991.

In 2007, the Maryland Historical Trust and the Maryland State Arts Council created a new award presented at the Maryland Traditions showcase, the Achievement in Living Traditions and Arts (ALTA) Award, named for Schrock.

== Death ==
Schrock died on November 7, 2001, aged 90, of circulatory illness at Memorial Hospital in Cumberland, Maryland.

== See also ==
- Mennonites in Maryland
