= ARTAS =

- Developer: Eurocontrol
- Stable release: V9.1.2.0 / March 2025
- Operating system: Linux
- Type: Sensor Data Processing System - SDPS (a.k.a. Tracker)
- License: Eurocontrol Licence - Software available on request
- Website: Air traffic management surveillance tracker and server

ARTAS (ATM suRveillance Tracker And Server) is a system designed by Eurocontrol to operationally support Aerial surveillance and Air traffic control by establishing an accurate Air Situation Picture of all traffic over a pre-defined geographical area (e.g. ECAC) and then distributing the relevant surveillance information to a community of user systems.

== Users ==
A User of ARTAS in a general sense is defined in this context as any ATC subsystem having a requirement to receive at defined instants the best and most up-to-date estimate of all or selected aircraft state vector elements for all air traffic of interest to this User e.g.:

- Operator Display System,
- Flight Data Processing System,
- ATC Tools,
- Flow-Control Management System,
- Sequencing and Metering system,
- Remote TMA's,
- Military Units, etc.

ARTAS is a distributed system composed of a number of identical subsystems co-operating together. Each subsystem, called an ARTAS Unit, will process all surveillance sensor data to form a best track estimate of the current Air Traffic situation within a given Domain of Interest.

Adjacent ARTAS Units co-ordinate their tracks to build a unique, coherent and continuous Air Situation Picture over the complete area.

== Unit groups ==
Four groups of main functions are implemented in an ARTAS Unit:

- The TRACKER processes the sensor input data to maintain a real-time air situation, represented in a Track Data Base.
- The SERVER performs the Track and Sensor Information Services i.e. the management of all requests from Users and the transmission of the relevant sets of track/sensor data to these Users, and the so-called inter-ARTAS co-operation functions
- The ROUTER BRIDGE manages the external interfaces to the Normal Users, the Broadcast Users, the Adjacent ARTAS Units and the surveillance sensors. It also implements the Surveillance Sensor Input Processing function.
- The SYSTEM MANAGER processes the functions related to the Human supervision and management of the ARTAS Unit.

== History ==
In April 1990, the Ministers of Transport of the European Civil Aviation Conference (ECAC) launched the "En-route Strategy for the 1990s" - a multilateral strategy designed to ensure that, by the end of the century, Air Traffic Control capacity will match forecast demand.

This strategy drove an initial programme, EATCHIP - the European ATC Harmonisation and Integration Programme, developed and managed by EUROCONTROL to undertake the progressive harmonisation and integration of Air Traffic Services throughout the ECAC area.

A programme has been established to provide the framework for meeting the objective of the ATM 2000+ Strategy, EATMP – the European Air Traffic Management Programme, as a follow-up of EATCHIP. The overall objective of the current “ATM 2000+ Strategy” is to enable the safe, economic, expeditious and orderly flow of traffic through the provision of ATM services which are adaptable to the requirements of all users and areas of European airspace for all phases of flight. These services are to accommodate demand, be globally inter-operable, operate to uniform principles, be environmentally sustainable and satisfy national security requirements.

In the context of EATCHIP and the continuing EATMP, it has been proposed that a progressive integration of European Surveillance Data Processing Systems (SDPS) be introduced with the aim to:

- make use of advanced tracking techniques,
- eliminate the known shortcomings of tracking systems,
- allow an efficient service to a large variety of user system of processed surveillance information,
- and allow a seamless integrated operation in a multi-centre environment across Europe.

With this aim, the development of a prototype ATM suRveillance Tracker And Server (ARTAS) was undertaken which would function as a Pilot System for the systems to be implemented in forthcoming decade by EUROCONTROL Member and other ECAC States

The phased development of ARTAS started in June 1993. In parallel to the development, a comprehensive evaluation programme of the successive versions of the ARTAS Pilot system has been undertaken with a number of National ATM Organisations.

Following the evaluation programmes, ARTAS has been gradually introduced as operational system and it is part of the surveillance infrastructure of numerous operational centres of Europe.

It is believed that such an implementation of a harmonised Surveillance Data Processing System like ARTAS, together with the wide introduction of Radar Data Networks and the improvements of radar sensors created the necessary technical condition for improved ATM co-ordination and the uniform application of radar separation minima throughout a large part of Europe.

In addition to the ARTAS system, a Central ARTAS software Maintenance and Operational Support (CAMOS) service for those versions of ARTAS that are in pre-operational or operational use was created. CAMOS collects the ARTAS system data and parameters needed to ensure the exchanges of surveillance data between the States implementing ARTAS and provides software enhancements to the commonly developed ARTAS System for functionality required by changes in the technical environment or common user needs.

Frequentis Comsoft has been EUROCONTROL's Industrial Partner for Centralised ARTAS maintenance and support (CAMOS) since 2001 and is also a turnkey supplier of ARTAS systems.

Further evolution of the ARTAS system is taking place following Users requests, requests from Surveillance related Programme or due to technological advances

Considerable savings are realised because of the large scale implementation of ARTAS. These benefits are due to the use of a common development and support structure instead of many independent structures.

== Architecture ==
ARTAS is developed as a regional system concept consisting of individual surveillance data processing and distribution units, which together will operate as one entity. Each subsystem, called an ARTAS Unit, processes all surveillance data reports - i.e. radar reports, including Mode S, ADS reports, and Multilateration reports to form a best estimate of the current Air Traffic situation within a given Domain of Interest.

The system operates on the basis of defined blocks of airspace known as "domains". Each ATM Surveillance Unit (ASU) tracks all traffic in its own defined airspace, known as a "Domain of Operation". The domains of operation of adjacent units overlap. In the areas of overlap, inter-unit track coordination functions take place, ensuring system tracking continuity. In this manner, adjacent ARTAS Units can co-ordinate their tracks to build a unique, coherent and continuous Air Situation Picture over the complete area.

The seamless integration of all Units permits the application of 5NM separation minima throughout the total covered area, also at transfers of traffic from one ATC unit to the next one. 3NM separation can be done following an in-depth operational evaluation of the ARTAS behaviour in the local environments.

Through a User/Server type of interface, the systems connected to ARTAS (e.g. local display system, remote users like Terminal Areas without own Radar Data Processing System, Flow Management Units, etc.) may, in a very flexible way, define exactly the modalities of the track services to be provided, e.g., the area (domain) for which it wishes to receive a specific sub-set of processed surveillance data. The flexibility of the system is such that the Domain of the user is not limited to the Domain of Operation of the Unit in which the user is situated, but may encompass airspace in the Domains of Operation of several adjacent ATM Surveillance Units.

In addition to the so-called Track State vector elements (position, speed, Mode-of-Flight, etc.), maintained by the Tracker, the served tracks comprise other information of interest for the user systems, including Flight Plan related information, provided by the Flight Data Processing Systems users of ARTAS (Callsign, departure/arrival airports, type of aircraft, etc.).

== Versions ==
The initial versions of ARTAS were developed using the DOD-STD-2167A standard which remains in use as the structure for the main documents concerning the ARTAS product itself at system and CSCI levels. Later documents such as plans follow the MIL-STD-498; (this document is now available from IEEE repackaged as the J-STD-016-1995 with the various DIDs contained in normative Annexes). Recently, all the CAMOS-related activities follow the ED-153 SWAL3 processes.

With ARTAS V8B Version the ARTAS Unit is hosted into one ARTAS Station HWCI (AS). A dual ARTAS system consists of two identical computers (Chain) (master and slave) and their associated peripherals. The internal LAN (Ethernet/Bonding) is also defined as a HWCI (IL HWCI). The TRK, SRV, RBR, MMS and REC CSCIs of each chain are executed on only one node. Furthermore, with ARTAS V8B Version the MW (ARTAS Middleware) CSCI replaces the Off-The-Shelf (OTS) product UBSS. Without counting the COTS software, the ARTAs software (middleware and application software) represents a total of about 1.8 million lines of source code, written in Ada, C, C++, Python and shell scripts.

ARTAS V8B3, the MMS CSCI integrates a modern, ergonomic and flexible graphical user interface based on a Client/Server architecture. Furthermore, the new MMS CSCI does not need any Commercial-Off-the-Shelf products related to database (namely Ingres) and Graphic User Interface (Ilog Wave) The ARTAS software considering on-line, off-line components, middleware and application software, represents a total of about 2.1 million lines of source code, written in Ada, C, Java, Python and shell scripts. Further ARTAS versions will be developed to include ground tracking (gate to gate). At present, an ARTAS Surface Movement Surveillance prototype extension (namely ARTAS SMSp) is available for evaluation purpose.

ARTAS V9.0.0 addresses over 60 issues reported by its Users, including improved tracking in the vicinity of airports by integrating the System Manager System (SMS) prototype. Additional improvements were made to the management of ADS-B, as well as the system’s overall cyber security. This version also brings ASTERIX CAT048 extended range, automatic migration of the StaticGeo & Parameter datasets at DM load and extend Split Plot Filter (SPF) to Mode-S data.

ARTAS V9.0.1 addresses over 90 issues reported by its Users, including some mitigations for ADS-B issues, various improvements for WAM, a monitor of the ARTAS processes as well as some upgrades for cyber security threats. This version also brings some major code clean up and refactoring that will easy maintenance and evolution of ARTAS in the future. In addition, it introduces several welcome improvements on Requirement Traceability and Quality & Safety processes.

== Service Management and Actors ==
All changes in ARTAS are done under control of the ARTAS User Group (AUG) Change Control Board. ARTAS maintenance is shared between CAMOS (Centralised ARTAS Maintenance and Operational Support) and LAMOS (Local ARTAS Maintenance and Operational Support). CAMOS services do not include hardware support, but if required by the users, the Agency may decide to propose a service for the ARTAS hardware support as well. In the context of CAMOS, the EUROCONTROL Agency (ARTAS Service Manager) acts as AUG representative and provides directives to the service provider on behalf of the AUG.

The activities of maintenance and support are performed by the Agency, where EUROCONTROL experts in conjunction with their industrial partners, ensure support to the Operational ARTAS units as well as the Pre-Operational Units, defined through a Service Level Agreement with ARTAS users. Key Performance Indicators are used to set targets and to allow improvements to the Service Provider.

CAMOS, the Agency technical support team, is located at Brussels HQ, whereas the software maintenance and development is subcontracted to their Industrial Partner, currently Frequentis Comsoft. At present ARTAS is in operation at thirty-one ATC Centres in Europe and under evaluation in many other European states. In total, around 100 ARTAS units are currently implemented or in the course of implementation, at more than 40 European sites.
