= Arta FM =

Radio station in Syria

Arta FM (Arabic: آرتا إف إم) is a Syrian community radio station. It was established on 6 July 2013 in Amuda. A multi-ethnic Syrian team in several cities in al-Hasakah and Aleppo is producing radio programs in Kurdish, Syriac, Arabic and Armenian. A radio station allied with Arta FM, Jin FM, produces a program for women. As of 2013, the station had about 45 employees. It is supported by the US government and the Konrad Adenauer Foundation.

Arta FM has five 500W FM transmitters in the Syrian cities Amuda, Qamishli, Al-Malikiyah, Ras al-Ayn and Kobani
