= Alta Motors =

Former motorcycle manufacturer

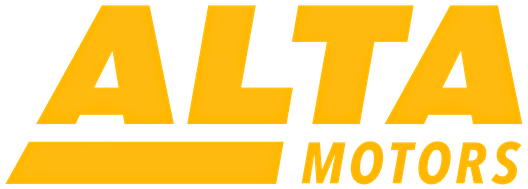
- Type: Privately held company
- Industry: Motorcycle manufacturing
- Founded: 28 October 2010
- Defunct: 18 October 2018
- Headquarters: 185 Valley Drive, Brisbane, California, USA
- Key people: Marc Fenigstein (CEO); Derek Dorresteyn (CTO); Jeff Sand (CDO)

Alta Motors was an American manufacturer of off-road and dual-sport electric motorcycles based in Brisbane, California.

== History ==
Derek Dorresteyn, whose family has a long presence on the San Francisco motorcycle scene, started working on a bespoke electric bike in 2007. He partnered with industrial designer Jeff Sand and entrepreneur Marc Fenigstein to found BRD Motorcycles in 2010. The acronym's meaning was only known to the founders and never disclosed.

In 2011, Alta hired Viktor Pritzker, a former director of sales at Vectrix. In 2013, Tesla co-founder Martin Eberhard joined the company's advisory board. After securing additional investors, BRD changed its name to the more evocative Alta Motors, a reference to its home region of Alta California—or North California.

In March 2018, Alta Motors announced a partnership with Harley-Davidson for the development of future models of electric motorbikes. However, H-D walked out of the deal six months later, opting instead to set up its own research and development unit in the Silicon Valley.

Following Harley-Davidson's divestment, the company was reported to be in negotiations with Canada's Bombardier Recreational Products for an injection of cash, but this did not happen and Alta Motors went out of business in late 2018. BRP later did acquire some of Alta's technological assets from its creditors.

== Products ==
- Redshift MX (motocross, base model)
- Redshift MXR (motocross, premium model)
- Redshift EX (enduro, base model)
- Redshift EXR (enduro, premium model)
- Redshift SM (supermoto)

A projected Redshift SMR model was registered with the NHTSA, but there is no evidence that it reached the market.

The Redshift platform is the basis for the SilentHawk stealth dirtbike developed by military contractor Logos Technologies of Fairfax, Virginia.

In 2017, the company also unveiled a prototype called the Redshift ST (for Street Tracker), which was pitched as a hybrid urban and flat track speedway machine.

== Racing ==
Due to debates regarding the equivalency between electric and combustion engines, Alta faced an uphill battle obtaining sanction to race in a major series, but the brand's products still showed up at a few established events.

The Redshift MX made its professional debut in the Lites class of the 2016 Red Bull Straight Rhythm off-season tournament, advancing to the second round. It returned in 2017, but was eliminated in the first round. On both occasions, the bike was ridden by Josh Hill.

Also in 2017, Alta announced that it would feature in the SX2 class at a pair of SX Tour events, the Geneva Supercross and the Paris-Nanterre Supercross, thanks to an exemption granted by the tour's sanctioning body, the Fédération française de motocyclisme. However, equipment shipping issues limited its participation to the Geneva Supercross' Duel Cup, a side attraction consisting of four riders competing in best-of-three, one-on-one playoffs. Hill won the second night, beating event spokesman Ricky Carmichael (Suzuki RM-Z450) in the final.

Alta made its AMA EnduroCross Championship debut in Round 4 of the 2016 season with Veteran class rider Kurt Nicoll. Nicoll won the event in his class. In 2018, the company upped its efforts, signing Ty Tremaine as a regular entrant in the Pro class. His third-place finish in Round 3 was credited as the first podium placing by an all-electric bike in an AMA-sanctioned professional series. However Alta Motors folded partway into the season, and Tremaine finished his campaign with Beta.
Tremaine, alongside Lyndon Poskitt, also took part in the 2018 Erzberg Rodeo hard enduro for Alta.
