= Alta Schutte =

South African cardiology educator

Aletta E. Schutte
- Born: 8 July 1977 (age 49); Klerksdorp, South Africa
- Education: Potchefstroom University for Christian Higher Education
- Occupations: Hypertension and blood pressure expert
- Awards: Harriet Dustan Award of Research Excellence, AHA Council on Hypertension , Peter Sleight Excellence Award in Hypertension Clinical Research, World Hypertension League
- Website: https://research.unsw.edu.au/people/professor-alta-schutte

Alta Schutte, Professor of Cardiovascular Medicine, Australia

Aletta E. "Alta" Schutte FESC FAHA ISHF FRSSAf FAHMS (born July 8, 1977) is a hypertension and heart disease expert based in Sydney, Australia. She is a SHARP Professor and Principal Theme Lead of Cardiac, Vascular and Metabolic Medicine at the University of New South Wales in Sydney, and the Co-Director of the Cardiovascular Program of the George Institute for Global Health. Until 2019 she was the Director of the Hypertension in Africa Research Team (HART), South African Research Chair (SARChI) and Director of the Medical Research Council Extramural Unit for Hypertension and Cardiovascular Disease at the North-West University in South Africa. She has fulfilled several leadership roles, including the President of the Southern African Hypertension Society, and President of the International Society of Hypertension, Secretary of the Australian Cardiovascular Alliance, and is the co-chair of the National Hypertension Taskforce of Australia.

She did her Doctorate at the Potchefstroom University for Christian Higher Education in Cardiovascular Physiology.

== Career and research ==
Schutte worked at the North-West University in South Africa from 2001 to 2019. When Schutte took on her former role where she was the South African Research Chair in the Early Detection and Prevention of Cardiovascular Disease in Africa, her primary focus point for her research was to detect early markers for the detection and prevention of hypertension and cardiovascular disease in the African community.

Since moving to Australia in 2020, she has taken on leadership roles to improve blood pressure control in the country and internationally, and has been successful as Chief Investigator with several funding schemes (e.g. CIA of an Investigator Leadership Grant and Synergy Grant from the National Health and Medical Research Council of Australia, and clinical trial grants from the Medical Research Future Fund of Australia).

In 2023, 2024 and 2025 she were listed by The Australian as the Leading Australian Researcher in Vascular Medicine.

In 2024 she received the Fiona Stanley Synergy Grant award from the National Health and Medical Research Council of Australia for the highest-ranked Synergy grant awarded (AU$5 million).

She was elected a Fellow of the Australian Academy of Health and Medical Sciences in 2025, and the American Heart Association in 2026.
