= USS Chanticleer =

USS Chanticleer has been the name of more than one United States Navy ship, and may refer to:

- USS Chanticleer (SP-663), a patrol boat in commission from 1917 to 1918
- USS Chanticleer (AMc-60), a ship designated as a coastal minesweeper and placed in service in 1941 but never converted to a minesweeper, soon reclassified as a covered lighter (YF-381) and renamed USS YF-381
- USS Chanticleer (ASR-7), a submarine rescue vessel commissioned in 1942 and stricken in 1973
