= Chanticleer, Arkansas =

- Unincorporated community
- Location within Arkansas Location within the United States
- Coordinates: 33°18′03″N 91°16′45″W
- Country: United States
- State: Arkansas
- County: Chicot
- Elevation: 125 ft (38 m)
- Time zone: UTC-6 (Central (CST))
  - Summer (DST): UTC-5 (CDT)
- Area code: 870
- GNIS feature ID: 61733

Chanticleer is an unincorporated community in Chicot County, Arkansas, United States. It is located at the junction of U.S. Routes 65 and 82, and Arkansas Highway 159 at the southern border of Lake Village.
