= Spruce Forest Artisan Village =

Heritage center in Garrett County, Maryland

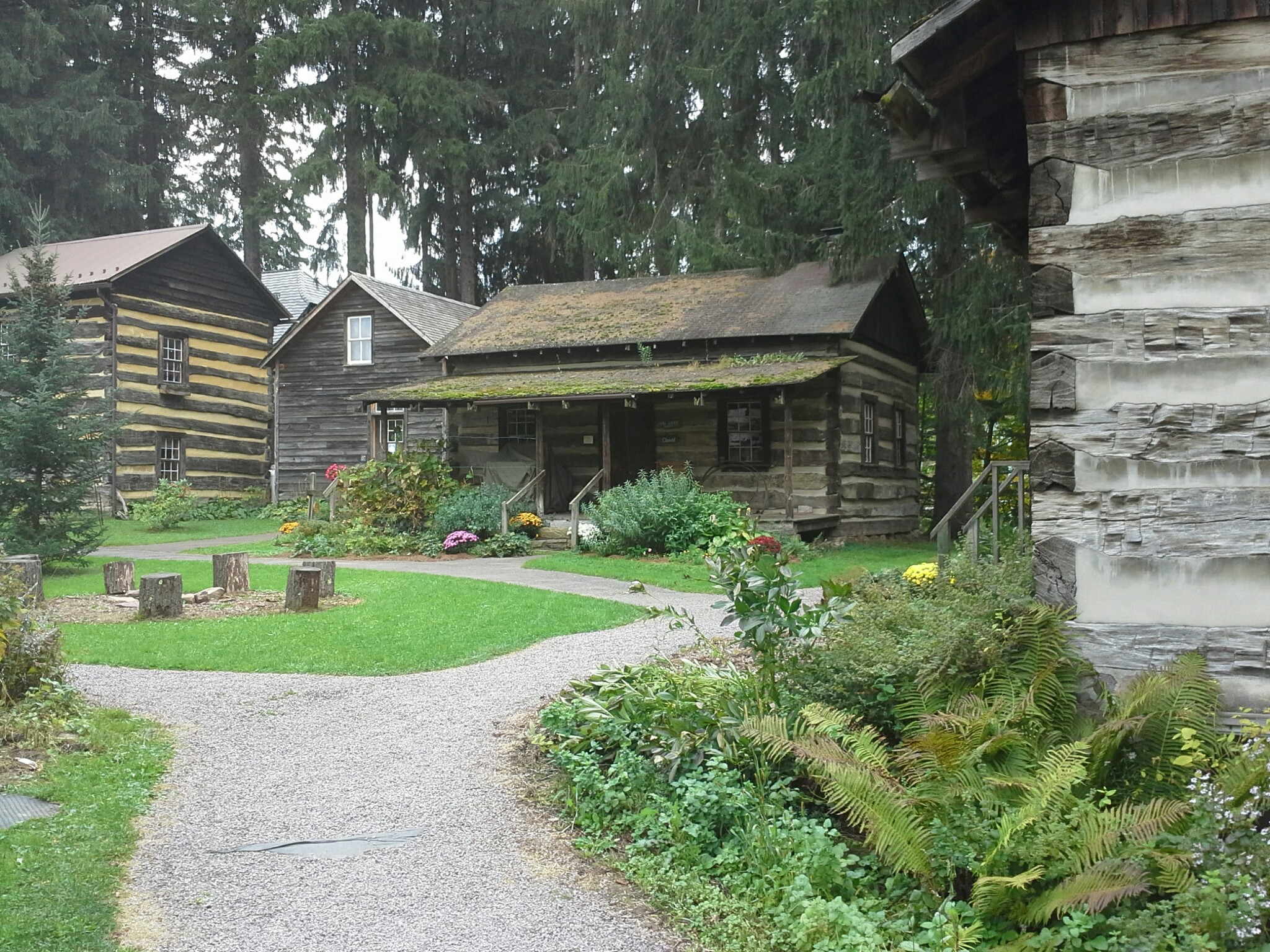
- Spruce Forest Artisan Village in September 2014
- Interactive map of Spruce Forest Artisan Village
- Location: Garrett County, Maryland
- Coordinates: 39°41′47.4″N 79°8′30.6″W
- Founded: 1957
- Founder: Alta Schrock

The Spruce Forest Artisan Village is an arts and heritage center in Garrett County, Maryland, that is dedicated to preserving the heritage of the region. Resident and visiting artisans demonstrate their crafts in restored log cabins and vintage frame structures. Artisan crafts include blacksmithing, weaving, wheel-thrown pottery, bird sculpting, woodturning, and jewelry-smithing. There are living history programs and several historic house museums, including the House of Yoder. Approximately 60,000 people visit the village each year.

== History ==
The region the village resides in was once known as Little Crossings. Three rooms of the Penn Alps Restaurant were originally a part of the log stagecoach stop known as the Little Crossings Inn. The village as it is today was founded by Alta Schrock in 1957. The historic buildings in the village were taken from various locations across Western Maryland and were restored on site. One of the village's cabins predates the American Revolution, one dates to the era of the American Revolution, and the other cabins date to around the 1830s. One of the village's cabins is the cabin that Alta Schrock lived in during her childhood.

=== 2020 wind storm ===
On April 8, 2020, fifty of the village's towering spruce trees and several buildings were destroyed by straight-line winds during a storm. The buildings that were damaged beyond repair were the Esther Yoder Cabin, the Red Shed, and the Covered Bridge Entrance. Other buildings, including the village church, were damaged as well. After the storm, all of the village's remaining spruce trees, even those that were seemingly undamaged, were cut down. The undamaged trees were removed because it was believed that they were weakened by the storm and would likely be brought down by the next one.

In October 2021, the village began planting new spruce trees. About 20 new trees were purchased with the $20,000 that the village had received in donations over the previous 18 months. The village plans to rebuild the entrance bridge in the early spring of 2022. The village also made plans for new pathways and a new parking lot.

== Activities and amenities ==
The village hosts 6 resident artists who showcase their crafts in the historic buildings and in the Penn Alps Restaurant Craft Shop. The village is open all year round, subject to weather in winter. The village frequently hosts public events and workshops can be scheduled with the artisans. The village hosts an annual Christmas in the Village every year, where the entire village is decorated with candles, lights, wreaths, and other Christmas decorations. The Casselman Bridge can be found at the west end of the village. Penn Alps Restaurant is located at the entrance to the village and the Cornucopia Cafe is located at the north end.

== See also ==
- Stanton's Mill
