= Buckel's Bog =

Buckel’s Bog
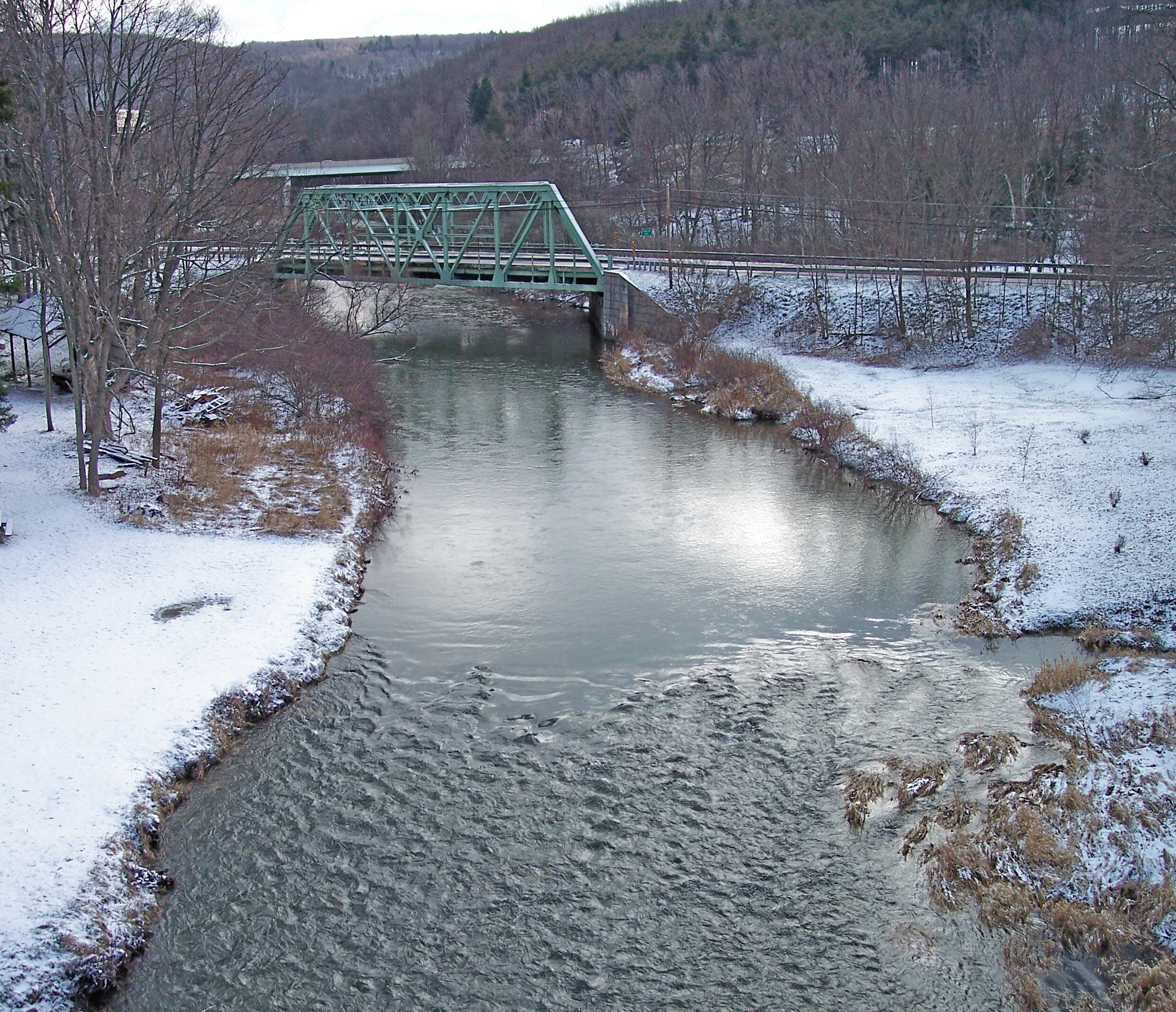
- Casselman River

- Location within Maryland
- Location: Garrett County, Maryland, U.S.
- Coordinates: 39°41′56″N 79°8′36″W
- Type: glade
- Surface area: 160 acres (65 ha)

Buckel's Bog was a 160-acre, shallow periglacial lake or a glade that occupied the headwater region of the North Branch of the Casselman River in Garrett County, Maryland, during the late Pleistocene epoch. It is the remnant of the only known natural lake in Maryland.

The eastern side of the remaining evidence of Buckel's Bog is presently traversed by the Casselman River as its waters flow northward into Pennsylvania. In the nineteenth century, the fledgling United States began its westward expansion; the National Road was one artery proposed and constructed to facilitate this westward flow. The proposed road would cross the Casselman River just south of Buckel's Bog, so the (at that time) country's largest stone-arch bridge was constructed (1813–14) over the river. The 80–foot–span Casselman Bridge, first used by wheeled vehicles in 1815, remained in use until 1933. Although now replaced by a nearby steel bridge, the stone bridge now serves as the centerpiece of Maryland's Casselman River Bridge State Park.
