= HMS Chanticleer =

Three ships of the Royal Navy have borne the name HMS Chanticleer, possibly after the character Chanticleer in Geoffrey Chaucer's The Nun's Priest's Tale:

- HMS Chanticleer (1808) was a 10-gun Cherokee-class brig-sloop launched in 1808. She was used as a survey ship from 1828, and was scheduled to make the second South America survey of 1831, but because she was in such poor condition Beagle was selected instead. Chanticleer was used as a Customs Watch vessel from 1845. She was renamed WV5 in 1863 and was broken up in 1871.
- HMS Chanticleer (1861) was a Camelion-class wooden screw sloop launched in 1861 and sold in 1878.
- HMS Chanticleer (U05) was a modified Black Swan-class sloop launched in 1942. She was damaged beyond repair in 1943 by a torpedo from U-515, and was subsequently renamed Lusitania and used as a base ship, before being broken up in 1945.
