= Arta (given name) =

Arta is a female name derived from the Albanian word artë, which means "golden".

Arta is also The Old Persian equivalent of the word asha, which means "truth" or "righteousness". It is also the name of a divinity in Zoroastrianism, the Amesha Spenta, who is the "genius" of "Truth" or "Righteousness". In the Younger Avesta, this figure is more commonly referred to as Asha Vahishta, which means "Best Truth".

Notable people with the name include:

- Arta (Kamuia), elder brother of the 1st century BCE Indo-Scythian ruler Maues
- Arta Bajrami (born 1980), Kosovar Albanian singer
- Arta Dade (born 1953), Albanian politician and former member of Parliament for the Socialist Party
- Arta Dobroshi (born 1980), Kosovar Albanian actress
- Arta Muçaj (born 1974), Kosovar Albanian actress
