= Alta, Fayette County, West Virginia =

Unincorporated community in West Virginia, United States

Alta, West Virginia
- Unincorporated community
- Location within West Virginia Location within the United States
- Coordinates: 38°12′26″N 81°10′38″W
- Country: United States
- State: West Virginia
- County: Fayette
- Elevation: 738 ft (225 m)
- Time zone: UTC-5 (Eastern (EST))
  - Summer (DST): UTC-4 (EDT)
- Area codes: 304 & 681
- GNIS feature ID: 1553719

Alta is an unincorporated community in Fayette County, West Virginia, United States. Alta is located on state routes 16 and 39, north of Gauley Bridge.
