= List of former ski areas of Quebec =

Former ski areas of Quebec

The Canadian province of Quebec has many ski areas no longer in operation. These include alpine skiing resorts and cross-country skiing stations. Some of these are quite famous or historic.

== List of alpine ski areas ==
=== Eastern Townships ===
The Eastern Townships (Cantons de l'Est) extend to the south of the Saint-Lawrence River valley, covering the eponymous administrative region of Estrie, and beyond; between the U.S. border and the Appalachian Mountains to the east.

==== Ski Shefford ====
Ski Shefford (45.954672°N 74.144244°W) was a ski hill on what was originally Quebec Highway 1, now Route 112, located on Mont Shefford, close to Ski Bromont. Ski Mont Shefford closed in 2006.

=== Laurentians ===
The Laurentian Mountains extend to the north of the Saint-Lawrence River valley, covering several administrative zones, including the eponymous Laurentides, and beyond. From the Ottawa River valley to the Côte-Nord of the Gulf of Saint-Lawrence.

==== Les Pentes 40-80 ====
Les Pentes 40-80 (previously Côtes 40-80, 45.9549041°N 74.1457133°W) was a municipal ski hill in Sainte-Adèle. It catered to novice skiers. The ski station was one of the first alpine ski station in the country, and was very popular in the 1950s. The ski station was deeded to the municipality by Charles Bronfman, with a clause saying that it needed to stay a ski slope. With the closure of the station, demolition of the base chateau and removal of the ski lifts, the area remains a public park with accessible ski runs but no lifts or services.

At the end of the station operating history, it was composed of a base chateau, four ski lifts, three T-bars and a magic carpet, five pistes, two green (runs 40, 60), a blue (run 80), a black diamond (run 100), and a glade double black diamond (run 120 or "Bois joli"). It had a 100 m (330 ft) vertical and the longest run was 600 m (2,000 ft). At one time, it was the cheapest lift ticket in the Laurentians.

==== Ski Mont Alta ====
Ski Mont Alta (46.040154°N 74.236531°W), founded in 1951, was a ski station located on Highway 117 in Val-David. It closed permanently after its ski lift controller was burnt up, when the chalet burned down in 2014. It now operates as an off-piste park, allowing winter hiking, ski-hiking, etc. in winter, without lift services.

==== Baumgarten’s Ski Hill ====
Baumgarten's Ski Hill, located on Baumgarten Hill, in Ste-Agathe, is reputed to have the first rope tow in existence, though that distinction is disputed with Foster's Folly at the Big Hill in Shawbridge (Prevost). The ski hill was opened by local businessman Moïse Paquette in 1928, and was continued to be run by his family after his death. The hill itself is named after businessman Alfred Baumgarten, who built a cottage at the base of the hill, by the lake, in the mid-19th century.

==== Ski Mont Castor ====
Ski Mont Castor located on Mont Castor, in Ste-Agathe, was a ski hill that operated from 1962 to 1995. It once operated 2 T-bar ski lifts. At the base of the ski hill is now located Maximise (46.067832°N 74.306000°W), an all-season ski/snowboard slopestyle training facility, with rails and big air, water landing ponds, trampolines, and airbag landings; and includes a winter snowpark, with rope-tow ski lift.

==== Le Chantecler ====
Le Chantecler (45.9451467°N 74.1423288°W) was an alpine ski hill on the south side of Mont Chantecler in Sainte-Adèle, on the north side is the still open Ski Chantecler. The resort hotel portion of the ski station is still open, as are the tubing, cross-country trails, and horse-drawn sleigh routes.

==== Chalet Cochand ====
Chalet Cochand is reputed to have been the first ski resort in North America. Émile Cochand's ski school opened in 1911, followed by the inn in 1914; in Ste-Marguerite.

==== Gray Rocks ====
Gray Rocks (46.158333°N 74.588889°W)

=== Greater Montreal area ===
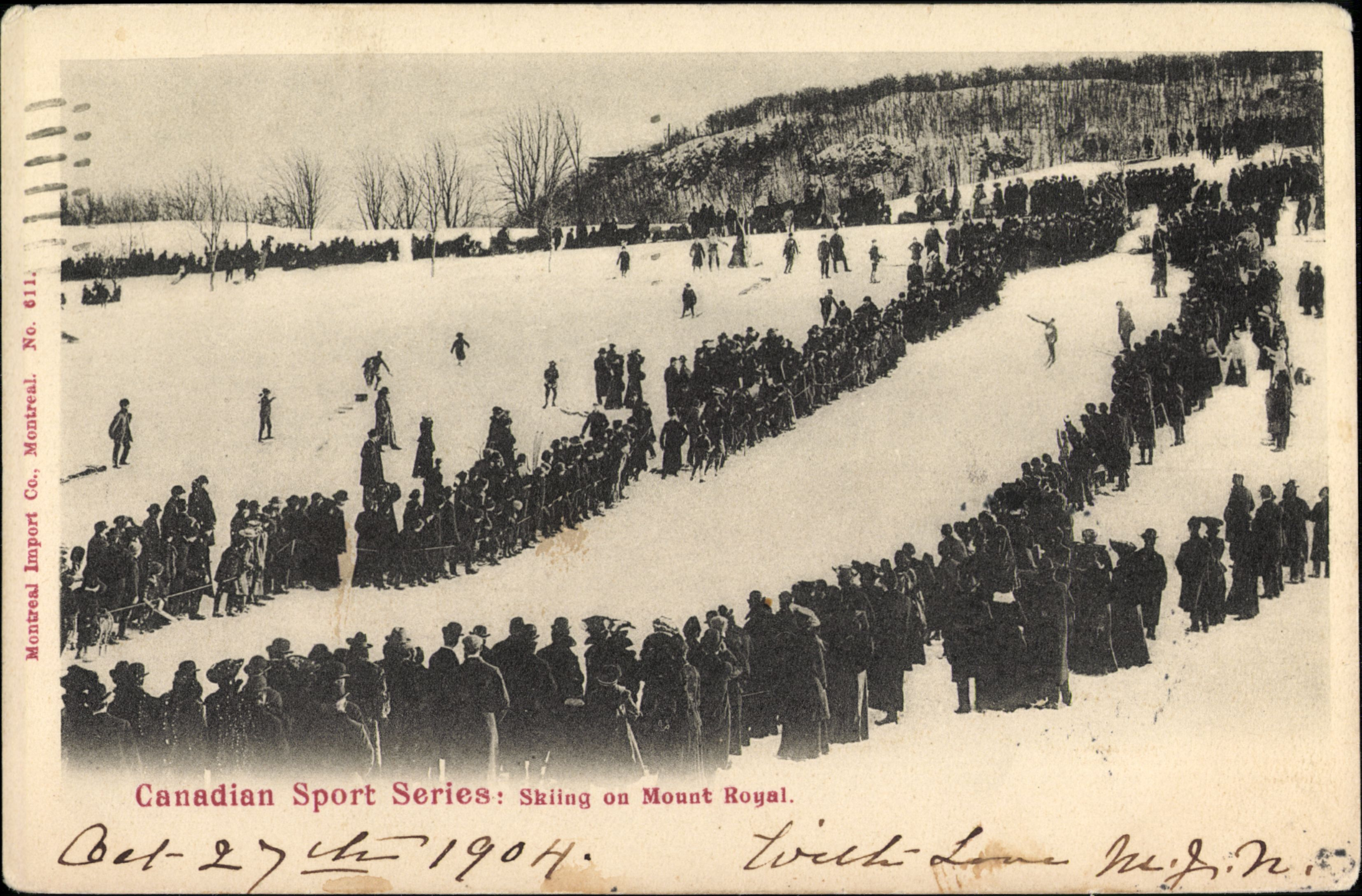
Alpine skiing on a former piste on Mount Royal, circa 1904

The Greater Montreal Area lies at the confluence of the Ottawa River and Saint-Lawrence River.

==== Slopes of Mount Royal ====
Mount Royal is the central hill on Montreal Island, one of the Monteregian Hills, created by a volcanic hotspot during the Cretaceous.

===== Mount Royal Park =====
Mount Royal Park, the grand central city park and hill of Montreal once hosted alpine skiing runs next to Beaver Lake (45.499945°N 73.594517°W) and ski jumps. The ski runs last operated in the 1990s. It now only hosts cross-country skiing, and sliding. Cross country skiing started in the late 1870s.

===== Université de Montréal =====
UdeM, the university on Mount Royal, once hosted two runs, a ski jump and a T-bar, at the top of Vincent d'Indy (45.508090°N 73.608196°W), that operated from 1944 to 1979.

==== Francesca Cabrini Park ====
Rosemont's Francesca-Cabrini Park's slope (45.581593°N 73.562425°W) once hosted ski runs complete with a ski lift.

==== Ignace Bourget Park ====
Verdun's Ignace-Bourget Park (45.454718°N 73.605608°W) once hosted a T-bar to allow for skiing.

==== Des Hirondelles Park ====
Ahuntsic's Des Hirondelles Park (45.576049°N 73.643502°W) once hosted a ski lift.

== See also ==
- List of ski areas and resorts in Canada
