= Alto (disambiguation) =

Alto (Italian for "high") is a musical term that has several possible interpretations.

Alto may also refer to:

== Places ==
=== Brazil ===
- Alto, Teresópolis, a neighborhood in Teresópolis, Brazil
- Alto do Coqueirinho, neighborhood in Salvador, Bahia

=== Italy ===
- Alto, Piedmont, a comune in the province of Cuneo

=== United States ===
- Alto, Arizona, a ghost town in Santa Cruz County
- Alto, California, a former unincorporated community in Marin County
- Alto, Georgia, a town divided between Banks County and Habersham County
- Alto, Indiana, an unincorporated community in Howard County
- Alto, Michigan, an unincorporated community in Kent County
- Alto, New Mexico, an unincorporated community in Lincoln County
- Alto, Texas, a town in Cherokee County
- Alto, Wisconsin, a town in Fond du Lac County
  - Alto (community), Wisconsin, an unincorporated community in Fond du Lac County

== People ==
- Alto of Altomünster, a German saint
- Alto, spouse of Mr Percival, famous Australian pelican and film actor

== Music ==
- Alto, a voice part in choral music, sung by either:
  - Alto or Contralto, the lowest female voice
  - Male alto or contratenor, the highest male voice
- Members of a family of instruments, including:
  - Althorn, the German name for tenor horn, a brass instrument
  - Alto saxophone, a woodwind instrument
- Alto, the French name for viola, a string instrument
- Alto clef

== Technology ==
- Direct Fly Alto, a Czech ultralight aircraft
- Suzuki Alto, a Japanese car
- Maruti Suzuki Alto, an Indian version of the Suzuki Alto
- Xerox Alto, an experimental American personal computer
- ALTO (interbank network), in Indonesia
- ALTO (protocol), a protocol for applications to discover routing costs to different endpoints
- ALTO (XML), an open XML standard to describe OCR text and layout information of printed documents
- Air-launch-to-orbit, a method of launching rockets at altitude from a conventional horizontal-takeoff aircraft, abbreviated as "ALTO"

== Other uses ==
- Nilfisk-Advance, a supplier of professional cleaning equipment has an Alto brand
- ALTO (film), a 2015 American-Italian mob comedy film
- Alto's Adventure, a video game
- Cirrus cloud#Relation to other clouds, where the prefix "alto-" is applied to cloud genera
- Alto (restaurant), a former restaurant in Manhattan, New York City
- Alto (rideshare), a United States rideshare company
- Alto (high-speed rail), a planned high-speed passenger rail network and project authority in Canada

== See also ==
- Alta (disambiguation)
- Aalto (disambiguation)
- El Alto (disambiguation)
