= Altus =

Altus or ALTUS may refer to:

== Music ==
- Alto, a musical term meaning second highest musical or vocal type
- Altus (voice type), a vocal type also known as countertenor
- Altus Flutes, a brand of concert flutes owned by KHS Musical Instruments

== Places ==
- Altus, Arkansas, US
  - Altus AVA, a wine-growing region near Altus, Arkansas
- Altus, Oklahoma, US
  - Altus Air Force Base, a United States Air Force facility located nearby
- Altus (Mygdonia), a town in ancient Mygdonia

== Structures ==
- Altus House, Leeds, a skyscraper in West Yorkshire, England
- Altus Skyscraper in Katowice, Silesia, Poland

== People ==
- Lee Altus (born 1966), Russian American guitarist

== Other uses ==
- A sub-brand of Turkish household appliances company Arçelik A.Ş.
- General Atomics ALTUS, an unmanned aerial vehicle
- Altus Group, a Canadian commercial real estate services and software company
- AltusGroup, a concrete company partnership
- Arkos Balkar, also known as "Altus", fictional son of the Supreme Lord in the Japanese web manga Centuria

== See also ==
- Atlus, a video game developer
- Attus, a spider genus (sometimes misprinted as Altus)
- Alto (disambiguation)
- Alta (disambiguation)
