= Carrier cloud =

Type of mass storage for a network of computers

In cloud computing, a carrier cloud is a class of cloud that integrates wide area networks (WAN) and other attributes of communications service providers’ carrier-grade networks to enable the deployment of highly-complex applications in the cloud. In contrast, classic cloud computing focuses on the data center and does not address the network connecting data centers and cloud users. This may result in unpredictable response times and security issues when business-critical data are transferred over the Internet.

== History ==
The advent of virtualization technology, cost-effective computing hardware, and ubiquitous Internet connectivity have enabled the first wave of cloud services starting in the early years of the 21st century.

But many businesses and other organizations hesitated to move to more demanding applications, from on-premises dedicated hardware to private or public clouds. As a response, communications service providers started in the 2010/2011 time frame to develop carrier clouds that address perceived weaknesses in existing cloud services. Cited weaknesses vary but often include possible downtime, security issues, high cost of custom software and data transfer, inflexibility of some cloud apps, poor customer and nonfulfillment of service level agreements (SLAs).

== Characteristics ==
To enable the deployment of time-sensitive and business critical applications in the cloud, the carrier cloud is designed to match or even exceed the characteristics of on-premises deployments. Therefore, the carrier cloud is characterized by some or all of the following items:

- Configurable, elastic network performance: Typical cloud computing solutions use the best effort of the public Internet to connect cloud users and data centers. This approach provides instant connectivity but does not offer control over network capacities, latencies, and jitter. Carrier clouds address these gaps with content delivery networks and/or dedicated virtual private networks (VPN) at OSI layers 1 (optical wavelengths), 2 (data link layer), and 3 (network layer). These VPNs can be configured to offer the desired performance parameters and exhibit the same type of elasticity for the network that regular clouds provide for servers and storage. To achieve the requested performance parameters, such as low latency, cloud applications can be (automatically) allocated to distributed data centers that are close enough to the cloud users.
- Automatic resource placement: For a cloud with multiple data centers, information about both the data center and the connecting network is relevant for a decision of where to place cloud images and storage volumes. For this decision, carrier clouds can obtain relevant information about the network, e.g., using the Application-Layer Traffic Optimization (ALTO) protocol.
- High level of security and governance: Cloud application providers are subject to general and domain specific security, privacy, and governance requirements and regulations, such as the European Data Protection Directive and the U.S. Health Insurance Portability and Accountability Act. For added security, the wide area network of the carrier cloud can provide segregated encrypted or unencrypted network links that are not accessible from the general Internet. At the data center, the carrier cloud provides e.g. virtual private servers, management processes, logs, and documentation to fulfill security and governance rules.
- Location control: Fundamentally, cloud users should not be concerned with the geographic location of their cloud resources. However, privacy and other regulations may mandate that certain types of data must not be sent outside a national jurisdiction or other geographical region.
- Open APIs: Carrier clouds provide graphical user interfaces and Web application programming interfaces that allow cloud application providers to set up, manage, and monitor both, the data center and the WAN, of their cloud services.

== Architecture ==
Carrier clouds encompass data centers at different network tiers and wide area networks that connect multiple data centers to each other as well as to the cloud users. Links between data centers are used for failover, overflow, backup, and geographic diversity. Carrier clouds can be set up as public, private, or hybrid clouds. The carrier cloud federates these cloud entities by using a single management system to orchestrate, manage, and monitor data center and network resources as a single system.

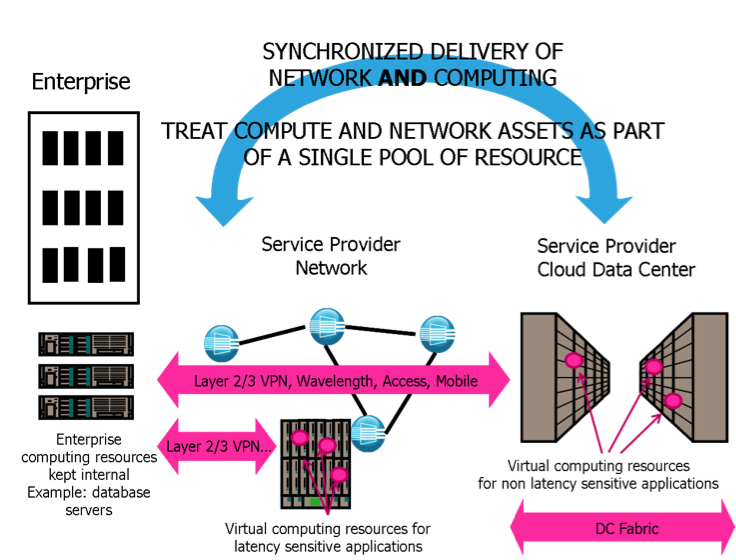
The carrier cloud synchronizes delivery of network and compute resources
