= Salero, Arizona =

Ghost town in Santa Cruz County, Arizona

- Ghost town
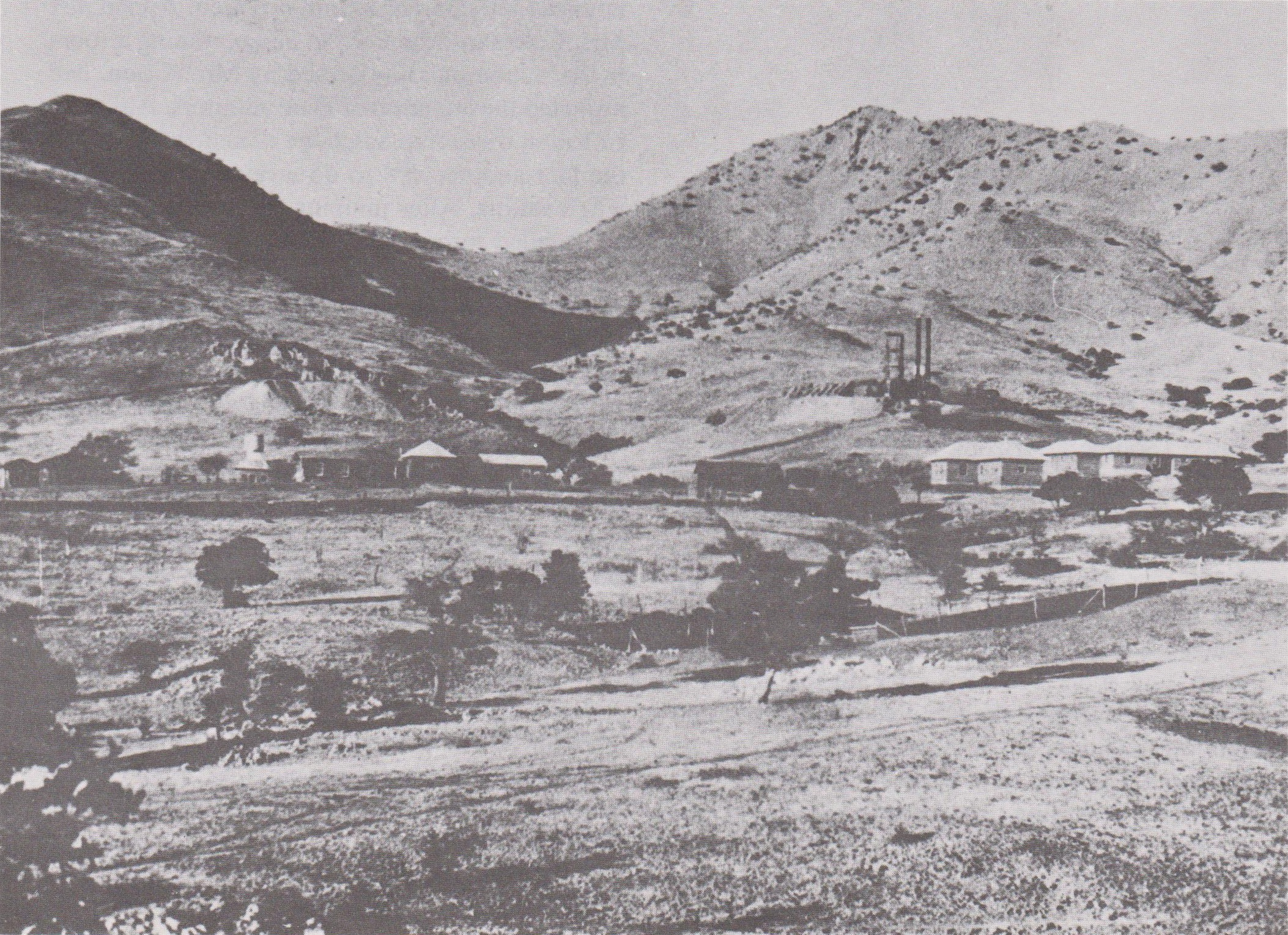
- Salero in 1909.

- Location within Arizona Location within the United States
- Coordinates: 31°34′50″N 110°51′32″W
- Country: United States
- State: Arizona
- County: Santa Cruz
- Elevation: 4,606 ft (1,404 m)
- Time zone: Mountain (MST)
- Post Office opened: August 13, 1884
- Post Office closed: April 17, 1890

Salero is a ghost town in the Santa Rita Mountains of Santa Cruz County, Arizona. As one of the best preserved ghost towns remaining in Arizona, Salero is located on private property of the Salero Ranch and is not open to visitors.

== Name ==
Salero is Spanish for "salt cellar" and was the name of the mine that the town grew up around. According to local tradition, the original Salero Mine was first worked by Spanish Jesuits in the 18th century, sometime after their arrival in what is now southern Arizona in the 1690s. One day, according to the story, the priests at the nearby mission of Tumacacori were expecting a visit from the Bishop of Sonora, so they had a large feast and a specially-crafted salt cellar made of silver from their mine prepared in his honor. The mine that supplied the silver was named "Salero" in memory of the occasion.

== History ==
A partnership of six men, including William Wrightson, Gilbert Hopkins, Samuel Robinson, Raphael Pumpelly and Horace C. Grosvenor, formed the Salero Mining Company of Cincinnati, Ohio, in 1857. Operating from their headquarters in Tubac, the company built a new mine over the old Spanish workings and put local Mexican settlers to work doing the manual labor. The Salero Mine became a steady producer, but Apache raids prevented the company from exploiting it to its maximum potential. Several of the miners were killed in Apache raids, including Wrightson and Hopkins, for whom the two tallest peaks in the Santa Rita Mountains were named.

The present-day Salero Mine and ghost town was established in the 1870s by George Clark, following the relocation of the mine a few miles to the east, further up in the mountains. A post office was opened at this new location on August 13, 1884, and was in business for only a short time until April 17, 1890. The Salero Mine remained active into the early 20th century and finally ceased activity sometime after 1920. Sometime later the surviving mine buildings were used as a ranch house, saving them from destruction.

What remains of Salero is on private property belonging to the Salero Ranch. Steps to stabilize and preserve the deteriorating adobe buildings have been taken and the townsite remains closed to the public to protect it from vandals. Signs are posted against trespassers. Other ghost towns in the area include Alto, about two miles northwest of Salero, and Kentucky Camp, to the northeast.

== See also ==
- List of ghost towns in Arizona
