= Alto, Arizona =

- Ghost town
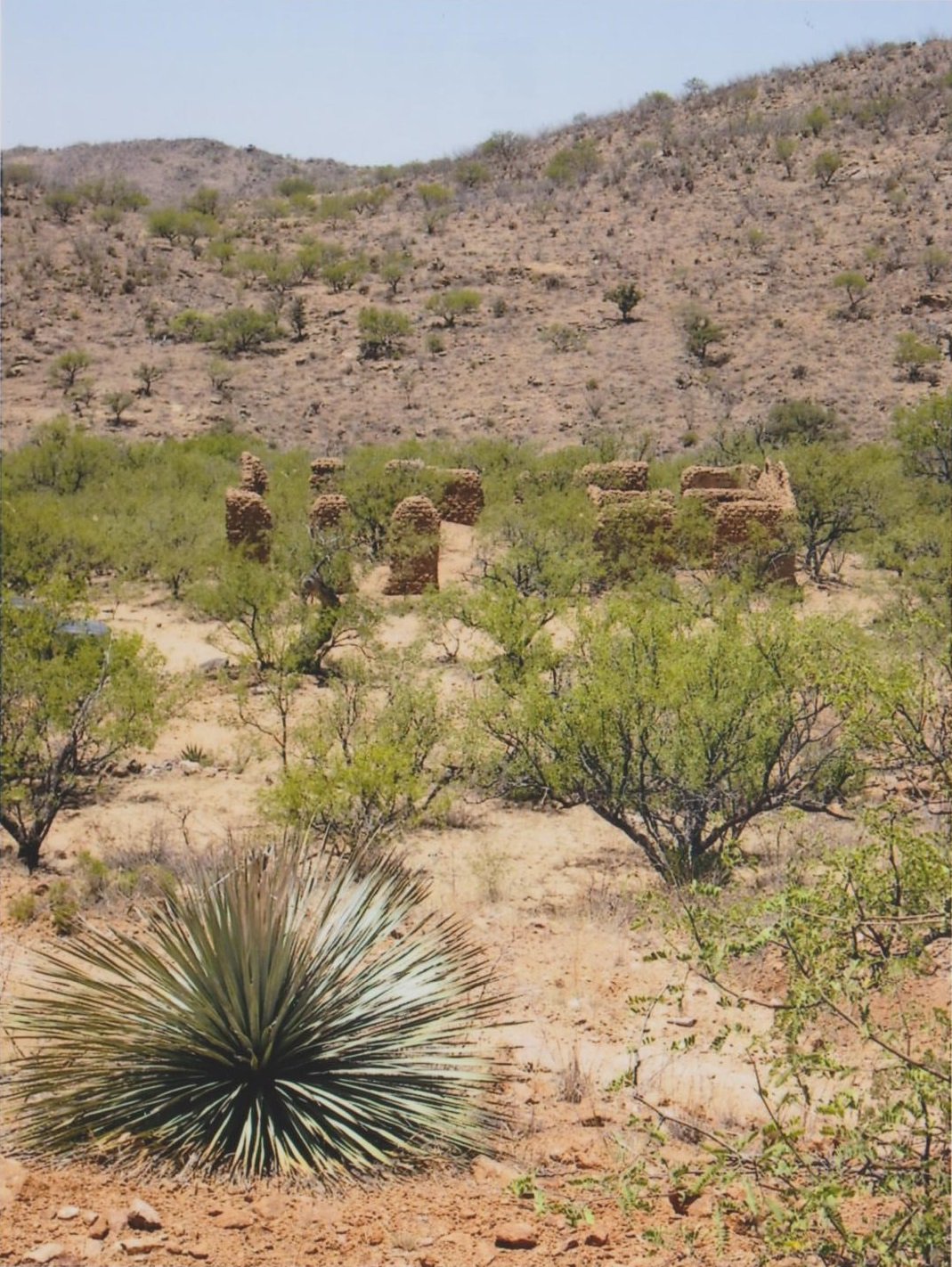
- The adobe ruins of the Bond house in Alto. One room was used as a post office between 1907 and 1933.

- Location within Arizona Location within the United States
- Coordinates: 31°36′36.50″N 110°52′20.86″W
- Country: United States
- State: Arizona
- County: Santa Cruz
- Time zone: Mountain (MST)
- Post Office opened: March 6, 1907
- Post Office closed: December 30, 1933

Alto is a ghost town in Santa Cruz County, Arizona, first settled in the early 1900s in what was then part of the Tyndall Mining District, east of Tubac in the Santa Rita Mountains. The town was originally named El Plomo, which is Spanish for "lead", and was changed to Alto, meaning "high", many years later, probably because the mines were located high up on a steep mountainside.

== History ==
The story of Alto begins sometime after the arrival of the Spanish Jesuits in southern Arizona in the 1690s. Sometime later, missionaries from Tumacacori discovered the rich silver veins of Alto while out exploring the hills to the east of their village. Although historical research does not support this claim, the Spanish were known to have started work on the original Salero Mine just a few miles away.

In 1875 Joseph Goldree opened the Gold Tree Mine in the Alto area, which led to the establishment of a mining camp at the foot of the mountain. Apache raids were a constant threat in the early years and as a result it wasn't until after the turn of the century that a town really began to take shape. A post office was first opened in 1907 in the home of a local pioneer named Josiah Bond, who was a former mining engineer, the local justice of the peace, school teacher, and poet.

Josiah's wife, Minnie, became the Alto postmaster. She was also a schoolteacher, but was killed instantly by a freak bolt of lightning not far from her home in 1922. The horse she was riding on was also killed. Her 14-year-old son, Albert, and his baby sister, Catherine, were riding with their mother that day, but were unharmed. Albert ran home crying that his mother had been hurt, so his father grabbed his rifle and went for his wife, thinking she had been attacked by bandits.

The adobe ruins of the Bond home and post office, which closed in 1933, are all that remains of Alto, apart from a small family cemetery and mine waste that was dumped over the mountainside. Salero, considered one of Arizona's best surviving ghost towns, is located just a few miles to the southeast of Alto on the Salero Ranch, but is not open to visitors. Kentucky Camp is on the other side of the mountains northwest of Sonoita, and has been carefully preserved by the Forest Service.

Alto's population was 25 in 1940.

== Gallery ==
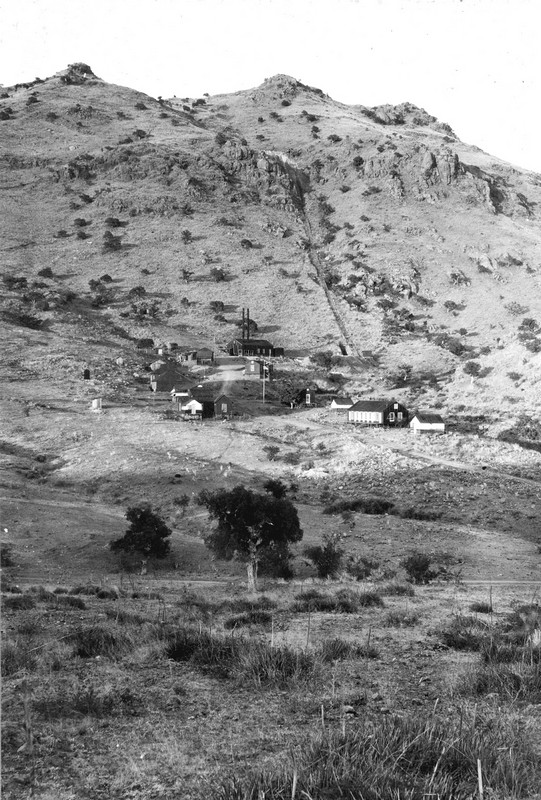
USGS photo of Alto in 1909.

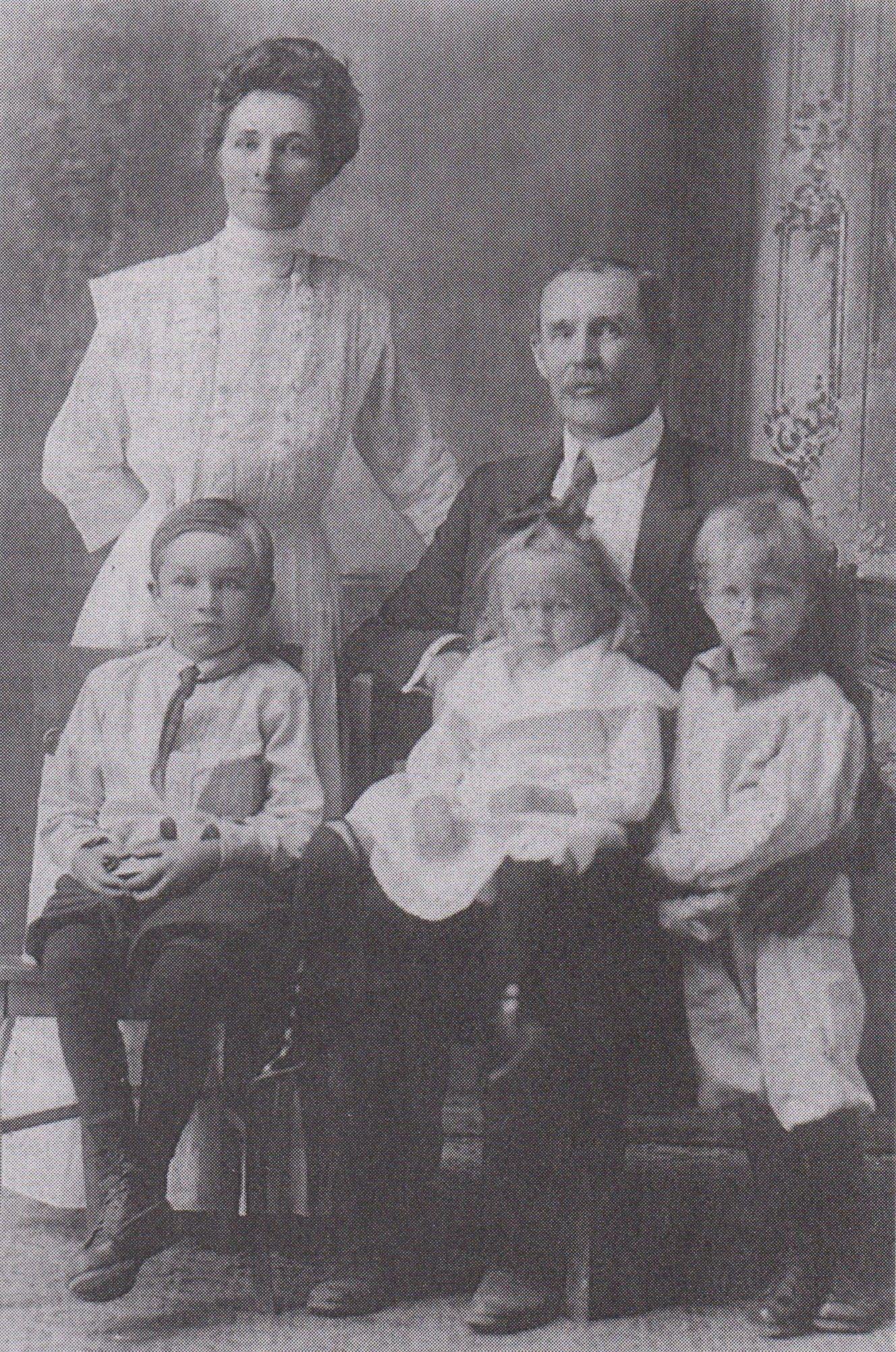
Josiah Bond (1858-1938), his wife Minnie, and their children.

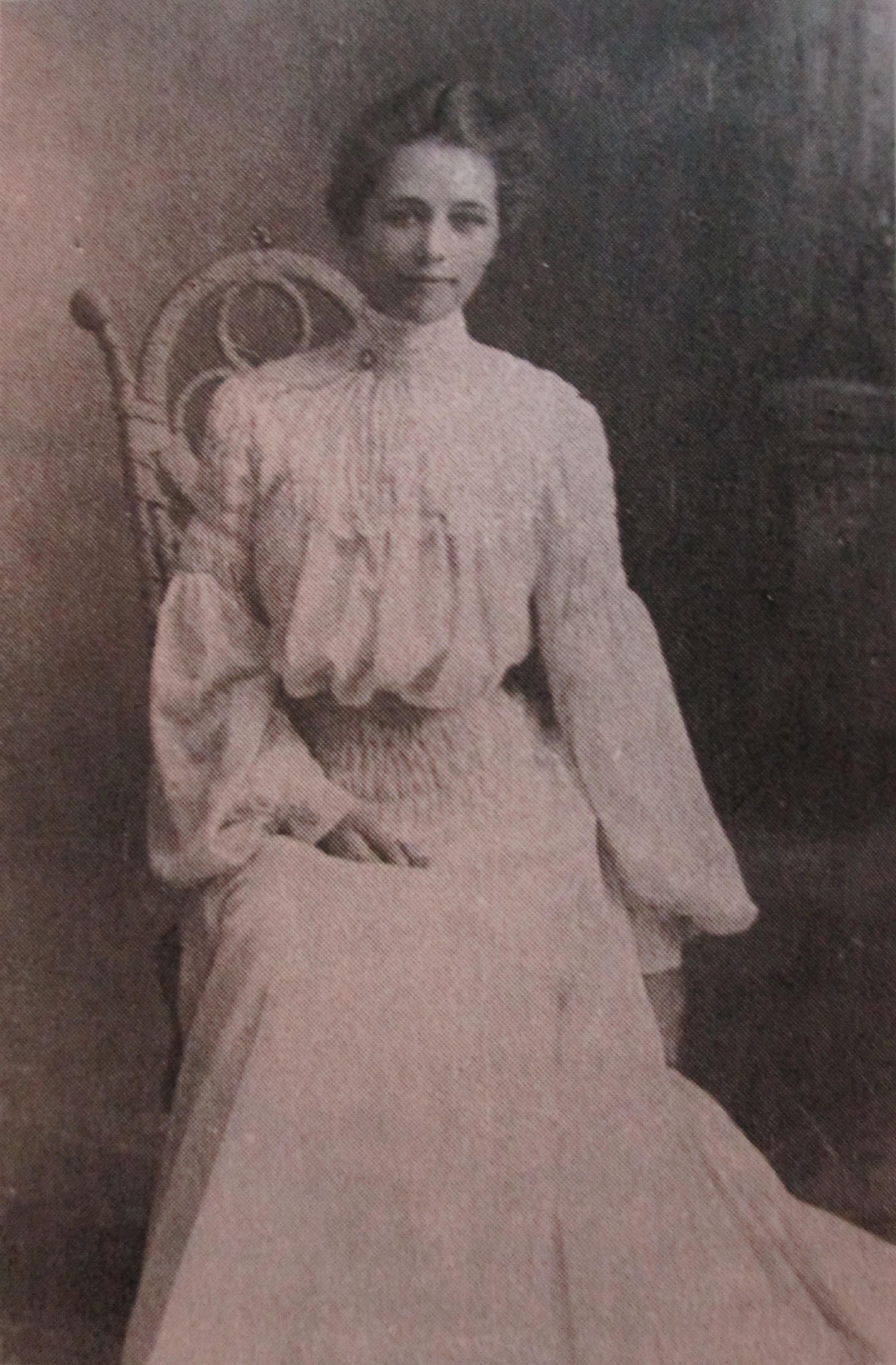
Minnie Amerman Bond
(1883-1922)

== See also ==
- List of ghost towns in Arizona
