= Nimbus (motorcycle) =

Danish motorcycle

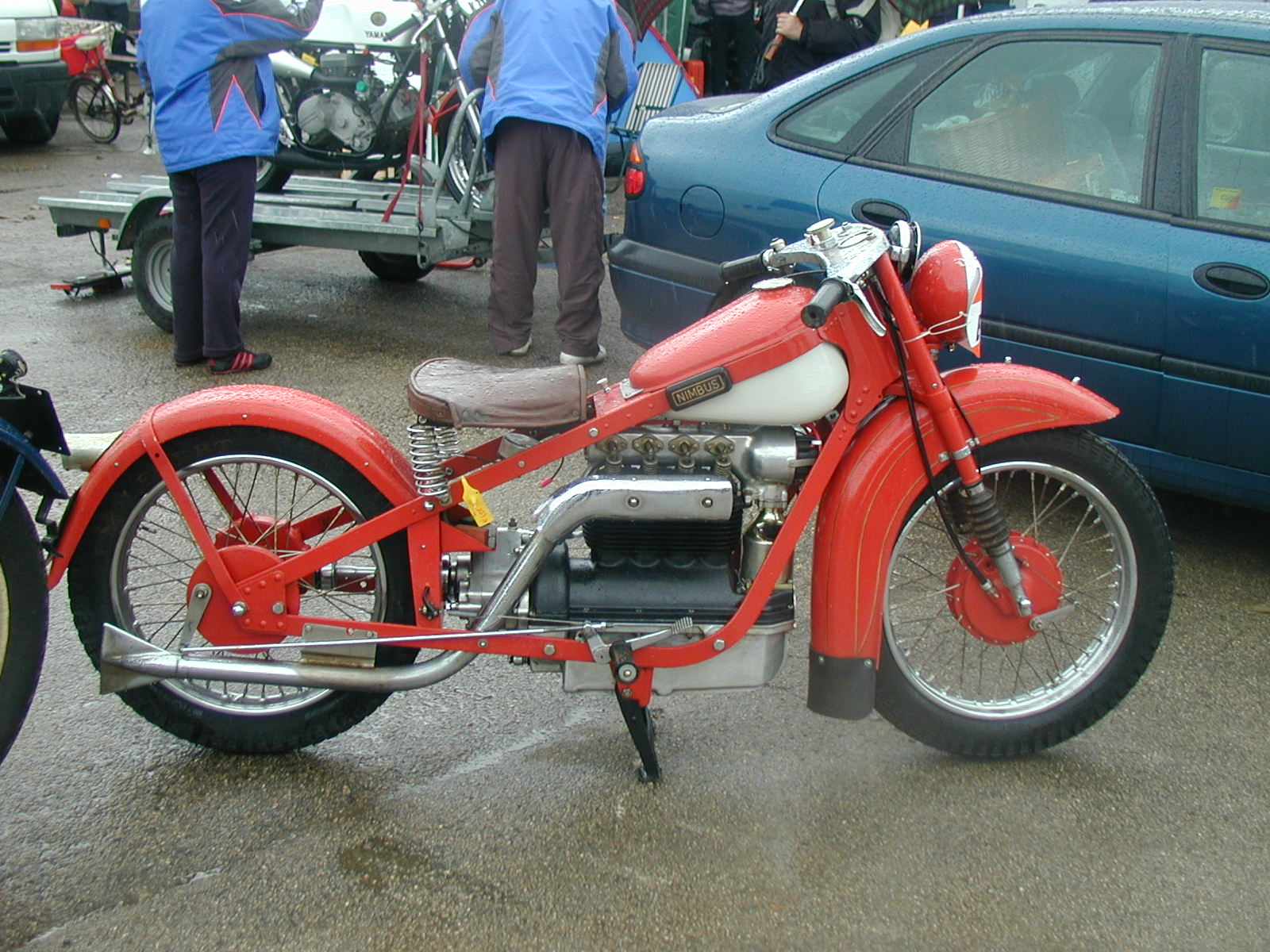
Nimbus motorcycle

The Nimbus is a Danish motorcycle produced from 1919 to 1959 by Fisker and Nielsen of Copenhagen, Denmark, also manufacturers of "Nilfisk" brand vacuum cleaners (now Nilfisk). Three basic models were produced, all with a 750 cc four-cylinder, air-cooled in-line engine.

== History ==
In partnership with Hans Marius Nielsen, Peder Andersen Fisker produced electric motors, some electric tools and from around 1910, the first electric vacuum cleaners in Europe. However, Nielsen was not keen to develop this line and the partnership was dissolved. Fisker believed he could produce a motorcycle superior to that generally available and in late 1918 constructed a prototype to his own design.

=== "Stovepipe" ===
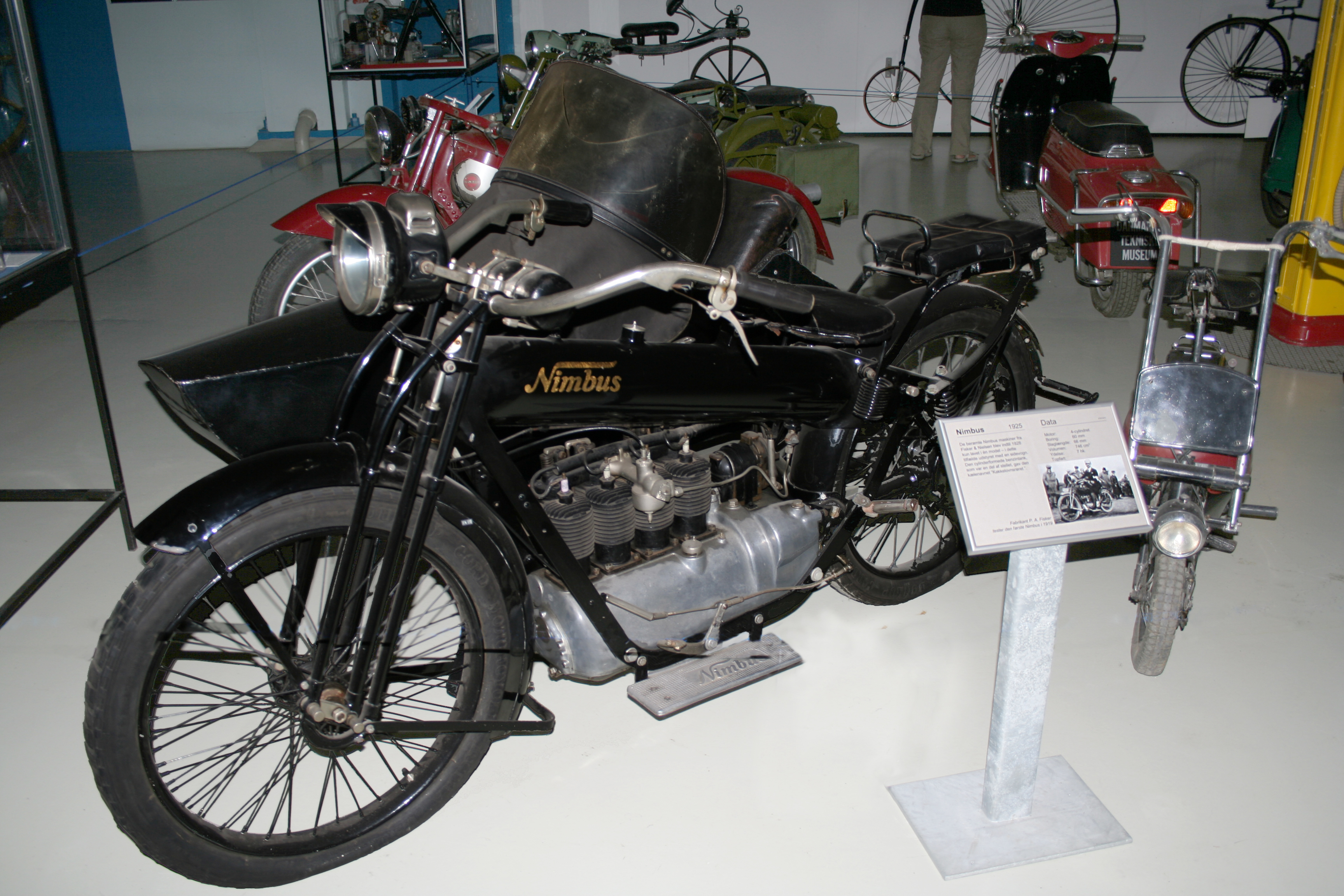
Stovepipe Nimbus with sidecar

The first Nimbus motorcycle had a four-cylinder inline engine of 746 cc (45.5 cu in) capacity, which drove the rear wheel through a shaft drive rather than the belt usually used at that time and had a power output of approximately 10 hp. Its top speed was around 85 km/h (53 mph) with a sidecar fitted. It had front wheel leading link sprung suspension and a technically advanced rear wheel swinging arm arrangement. The machine soon acquired the nickname of Kakkelovnsrør ("Stovepipe") due to the large diameter, round pipe between the saddle and handlebars which as well as forming the top tube of the bike’s frame, served as the fuel tank. Two more machines were constructed in 1919, but series production did not begin until 'Fisker & Nielsen' became a limited liability company in 1920.

Disappointed by poor sales of the Type 'A' machine, Fisker began entering the Stovepipe in all the races that he could, often with a sidecar attached and built up a good reputation for the model. The 'Stovepipe' was technically improved along the way, mainly in details, but also with the two main types of fronts forks, which distinguished the Type 'A' (shown) from the Type 'B' which had trailing link sprung suspension. However, the introduction of a sales tax on motorcycles in 1924 and an economic recession resulted in production being discontinued from 1926 after some 1,300 machines had been produced.

=== Type C ===
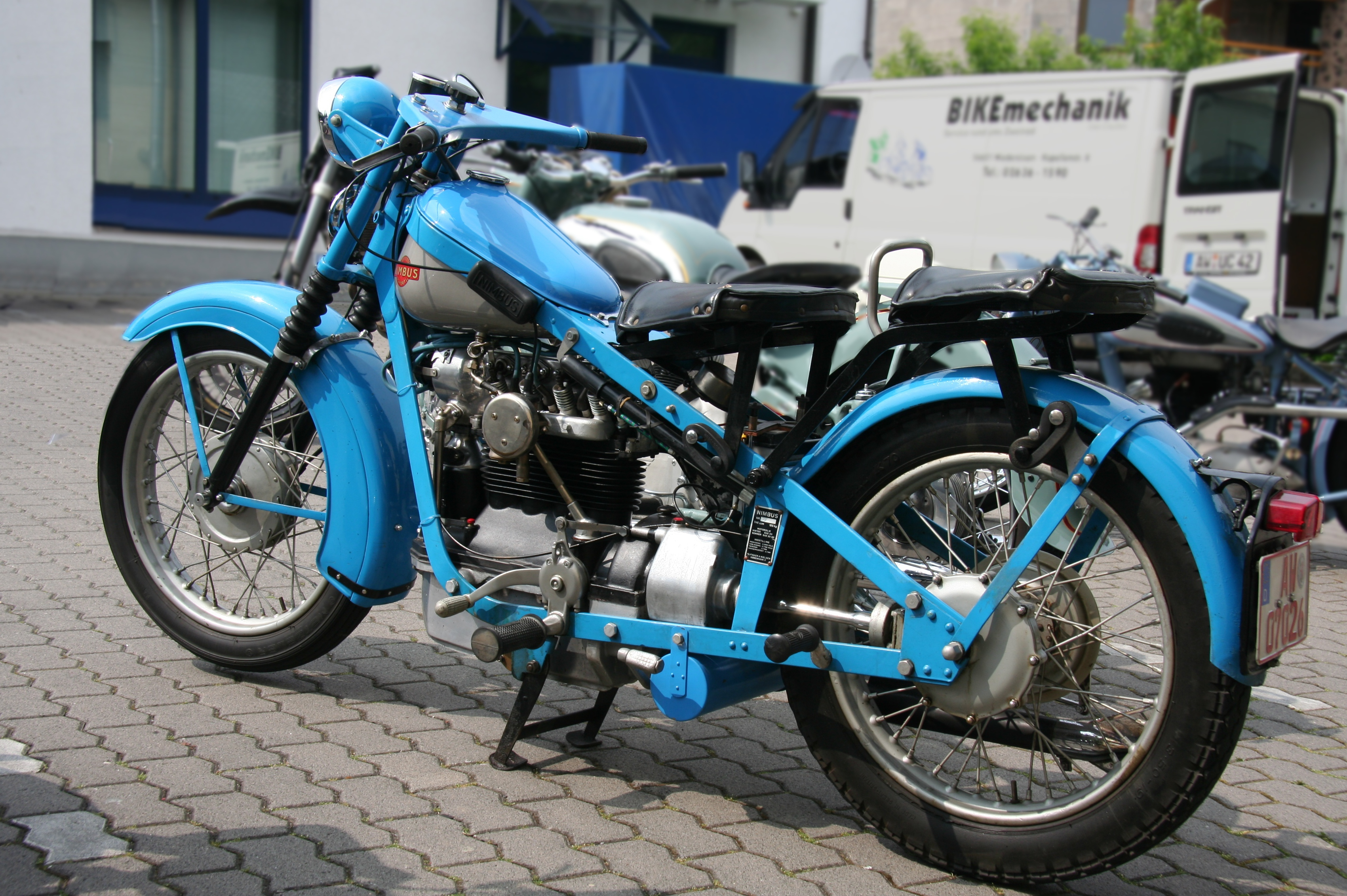
1950 Nimbus

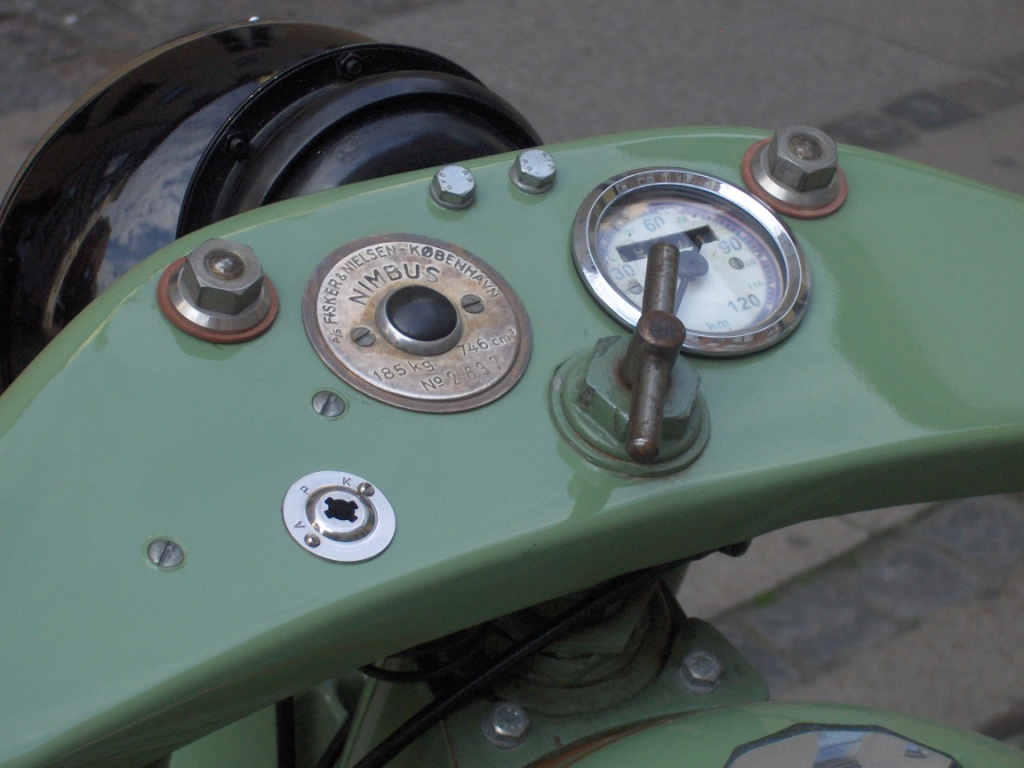
1937 Nimbus dashboard

With his son Anders, Fisker started designing a new machine in 1932 and in 1934 they demonstrated a new Nimbus motorcycle, the Type 'C'. This retained the drive shaft but had a completely redesigned ohc engine (distinguished by its exposed valves) of 18 (later 22) hp fitted in a frame made from 40mm X 8mm steel flat bar using riveted construction. The machine had a single-plate clutch coupled to a 3-speed transmission of the sliding spur type. Final drive was by cardan shaft, rubber torsion blocks and spiral bevel crown wheel and pinion with the rear axle supported on taper-roller bearings. Coil ignition was employed as part of the 6-volt electrical system having a vertically-mounted, crankshaft-driven dynamo which also served to drive the overhead camshaft and distributor - in this regard similar to the Wolseley-designed Morris Minor engine of 1928. The frame was shaped to go around the fuel tank, much like the pressed steel frames of several other motorcycles of the period, e.g. Zündapp and BMW. Front suspension was by telescopic fork with the pressed steel handlebars forming the top yoke. Although these forks were introduced a year before the BMW R12, the R12's fork had hydraulic damping upon introduction whereas the Nimbus's forks did not have hydraulic damping until 1939. Its distinctive humming exhaust note led to it being nicknamed Humlebien ("Bumblebee").

The first customer received his Type 'C' in the summer of 1934 and thanks to an efficient dealer network, the "Bumblebee" soon became the best-selling motorcycle in Denmark. The Danish Post Office, Army and Police purchased substantial numbers of this model and in 1939 as war loomed, the Danish government spent DKK 50 million on motorizing the army and many Type 'C's were included in this expenditure.

During the occupation by German forces from 1940 to 1945, it was difficult for Fisker & Nielsen to obtain the materials needed for motorcycle production and only about 600 machines were made during this period.

Shortly after World War II, a different engine with enclosed valve gear was built and tested. However, given that the factory had no difficulty in selling every motorcycle it could manufacture, it was decided not to make any major investments in new tooling for a successor model. Instead, for 1948 the front forks were redesigned and minor improvements were introduced elsewhere, it usually being possible to upgrade existing models to a current production specification. The Danish Army bought around 20% of Fisker & Nielsen's total production and this, no doubt, influenced the decision not to introduce a Type 'C' replacement; the military would be unlikely to want an enlarged spares inventory to support an additional model.

The Postal Service bought many Type 'C' models, using them as recently as 1972. The Danish police force also was a large fleet customer but phased out their Nimbuses in the late 1950s and early 1960s when they became too slow to keep up with modern cars and motorcycles; the top speed of a stock solo bike was only 120 km/h (75 mph), and that for brief bursts only. Almost none were exported.

In the 1950s some further prototypes were built, including a four-cylinder engine with rotary valves and carbon seals as well as a two-cylinder model with sprung rear suspension; neither of these reached production. Anders Fisker, who spent the final years of his life in poor health and no longer with the enthusiasm to propel new ideas into quantity production, died in 1964.

Many detail features of the "Bumblebee" were changed during its lifespan; e.g. a switch from hand to foot gear change and larger brakes (150 mm to 180 mm). Nevertheless, the basic design was never altered and as interest in motorcycles declined in the late 1950s due to the increasing availability of affordable cars such as the Volkswagen Beetle and the Fiat 500, production ceased in 1959 when the last contract from the army was delivered.

The Nimbus has gained recognition in Denmark and other countries for its distinctive design. It is noted for its technical features and practical use as a means of transport, although its performance is considered lower than the requirements of modern traffic.

== Surviving examples ==
Of around 12,500 "Bumblebees" produced, today more than 3,900 are registered and running in Denmark alone with likely a few hundreds used outside Denmark - mainly in Sweden, Germany and a few in the US. Other Type 'C' examples exist, either in museums or not currently registered for road use.

Even today, most spare parts (although not "tinware") are readily available as well as being relatively inexpensive. Thanks to the design's inherent reliability, using a Nimbus on a daily basis is still considered easy and economical. Nevertheless (and with some notable exceptions), today most Nimbus owners rarely ride more than a few thousand kilometers a year. Also, as the Nimbus often came from the factory with a sidecar attached, many of the ones on the road have recently been fitted with such as this combination was very popular with sole traders.

== In popular culture ==
The 1948 short film by Danish director Carl Theodor Dreyer, De nåede færgen (They Made it to the Ferry), is regarded by film enthusiasts as a masterpiece of suspense and rhythm. Though it was formally an educational short flick about road safety, the young couple involved in a race with death (a sinister grim reaper figure driving recklessly an old fashioned hearse-style sort of van) while speeding to catch the Nyborg ferry in time, is riding a 1948 Type 'C' Nimbus 750 sports model. The rider's brag for 120 km/h top speed to a young petrol pump maid may be over-optimistic for this kind of workhorse, especially with a passenger on the pillion seat, but the couple nevertheless finally take the ferry over River Styx...in twin coffins.

== Sources ==
- "Nimbus: Halo of Danish motorbike production". Denmark.dk. 7 December 2007.
