= Nilfisk =

Danish cleaning equipment company

Nilfisk A/S
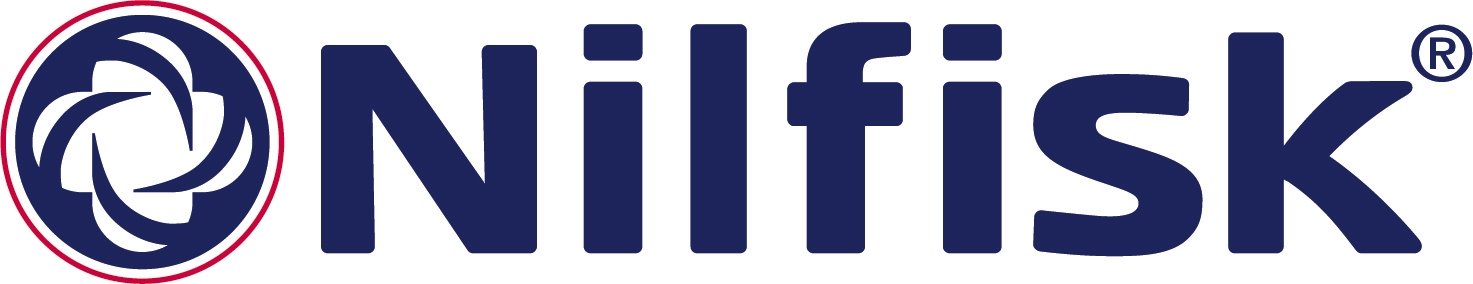
- Type: Public
- Traded as: Nasdaq Nordic: NLFSK
- Industry: Manufacturing industry
- Founded: 1906
- Headquarters: Copenhagen, Denmark
- Key people: Jon Sintorn (President & CEO)
- Products: Cleaning equipment and full cleaning systems
- Website: www.nilfisk.com

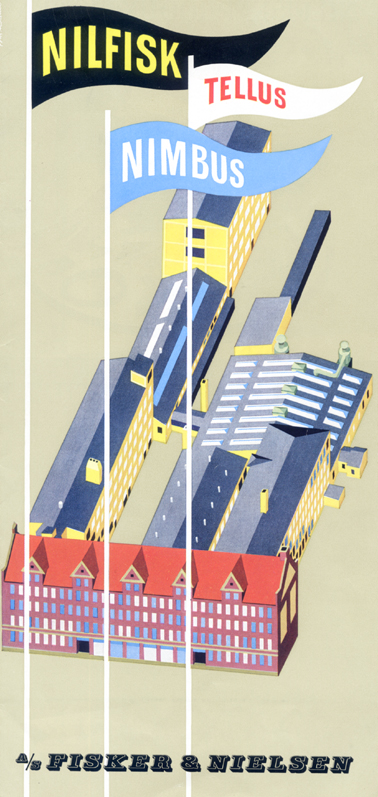
The Nilfisk factory in Frederiksberg, Denmark (1954).

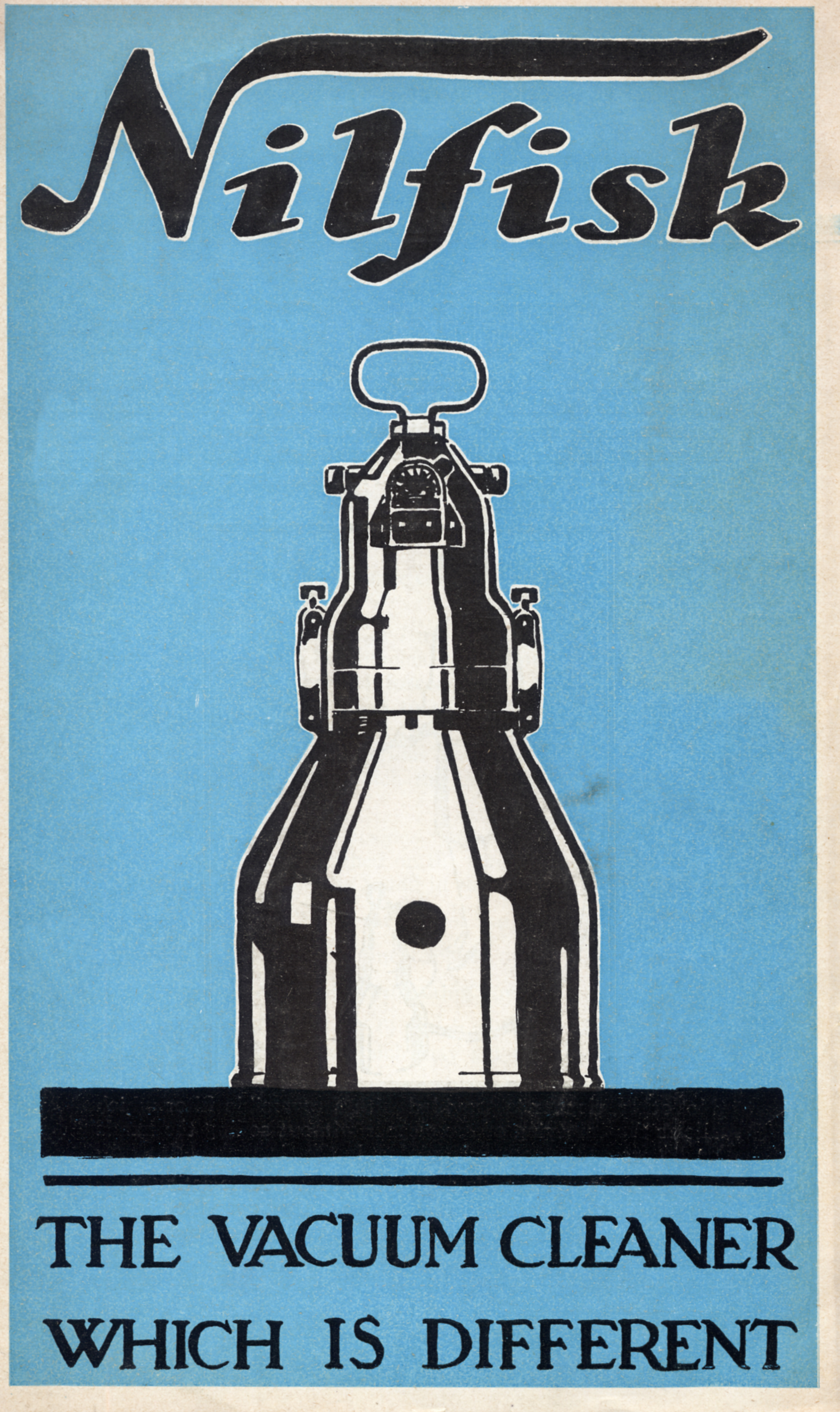
One of the early Nilfisk-models (English commercial from the 1930s).

Nilfisk is a supplier of professional cleaning equipment in both industrial, commercial and consumer markets. The company is headquartered in Copenhagen, Denmark, with sales entities in 45 countries and dealers in more than 100 countries. Nilfisk has manufacturing facilities in various countries. It has approximately 4,844 employees worldwide. The company's core businesses are the supply of industrial and commercial cleaning machines and professional high-pressure cleaning equipment. Nilfisk also markets vacuum cleaners and high-pressure cleaners to consumers. The company was owned by NKT Holding until late 2017. Nilfisk is a part of the United Nations Global Compact. The company was spun off by NKT Holdings in October 2017 and is now listed as an independent company on Nasdaq Copenhagen.

== History ==
Nilfisk was founded in Denmark in 1906 by Peder Andersen Fisker (1875–1975) and Hans Marius Nielsen (1870–1954) as Fisker & Nielsen. Originally the company produced electrical engines as the basic component in ventilators, kitchen elevators, drilling machines and, later on, the Nimbus motorcycle.

In 1989 NKT Holding, listed on the Copenhagen Stock Exchange, bought Fisker & Nielsen. In 1994 Nilfisk A/S acquired Advance Machine Company and in 1998 Nilfisk A/S was renamed Nilfisk-Advance. In 1998 Nilfisk-Advance merged with Euroclean/Kent and between 2000 and 2011, Nilfisk-Advance acquired CFM, Gerni, ALTO, Ecologica, United States Products, Viper, Hydramaster, Egholm, Plataforma and Jungo, making Nilfisk-Advance one of the largest suppliers of professional cleaning equipment worldwide. In 2015, Nilfisk-Advance changed name to Nilfisk. In 2020, Nilfisk partnered with Thoro.ai, originally part of Carnegie Robotics LLC. The tornado outbreak of March 29–31, 2022 destroyed their Springdale plant in 2022.

== Machines ==
Nilfisk produces a variety of machines in their Brooklyn Park, Minnesota production facility and Springdale, Arkansas facility, as well as in Hungary, Mexico, China, and Italy. The SC50 autonomous scrubber module is their flagship product, in addition to the commercial SC6500 model, and the industrial SC8000, SW8000, CS7010, and 7765 models in production. In 2016, their robotic floor scrubbers were considered among "the nation's most advanced" by the Star Tribune.
