= Alto (rideshare) =

American ridesharing company

- Type: Private
- Founded: 2018
- Founders: Will Coleman; Alexandra Halbardier
- Headquarters: Dallas
- Area served: Dallas and Houston
- Products: Rideshare
- Website: ridealto.com

Alto is an American ridesharing company based in Dallas, Texas. It is available in Dallas and Houston, Texas. Founded in 2018 by Will Coleman and Alexandra Halbardier, the company differs from most ridesharing platforms by owning its vehicle fleet and employing its drivers as W-2 employees rather than independent contractors.

== History ==
Alto was founded in 2018 by Will Coleman and Alexandra Halbardier. Unlike traditional ridesharing platforms, Alto owns its vehicle fleet and employs its drivers as W-2 employees rather than using independent contractors driving personal vehicles. The company operates depots where its vehicles are charged, cleaned, maintained and staged for service.

Alto expanded to Washington, DC in January 2022. It launched in San Francisco in February 2022 but exited the market a year later. At the time, it said that the decision would speed its growth in the remaining markets of Los Angeles, Miami, Washington, D.C., Dallas and Houston and that it would soon announce new markets.

In January 2024, Alto ceased operations in Washington, DC and Miami. It has since also exited the Los Angeles market and retrenched to Dallas and Houston. The company also announced that it was abandoning its plans to transition to an all-EV fleet.

In 2024, the company purchased rights to be the only ride-share app allowed for curbside pickup at Dallas Love Field Airport.
