= AltusGroup =

AltusGroup, Inc.
- Industry: Construction; Concrete
- Founder: Oldcastle Precast, Building Systems; Chomarat North America
- Key people: Katherine Koslowski-Blatz, Executive Director
- Products: CarbonCast High Performance Insulated Wall Panels; CarbonCast Insulated Architectural Cladding
- Website: altusprecast.com

AltusGroup, Inc. is an international partnership of 12 precast concrete companies and industry suppliers founded in July 2003 to develop, manufacture and market precast concrete innovations throughout North America.

Innovations include the CarbonCast line of technology that uses C-GRID carbon fiber grid for shear reinforcing developed by Chomarat North America.

== History ==
AltusGroup emerged from a development initiative between Oldcastle Precast and Chomarat North America, formerly TechFab, LLC.

Chomarat North America first conceived commercial grid structures using fiberglass roving and epoxy in 1997. It was initially named, “PetroGrid,” and introduced by Amoco Fabrics & Fibers Co. in 1998 to create geo-grids for the road paving market.

In 1998-99, Chomarat North America and Oldcastle Precast entered a joint development agreement to explore the use of carbon fiber structural grids for use in concrete. The original precast product champion and technology visionary was Harold Messenger.

From 1998-2001, development efforts focused on product, process, testing, and engineering design validation surrounding grid use in concrete. Dr. Thomas Harmon, a professor of engineering at Washington University in St. Louis, provided primary research support for the initiative, also co-funded by both companies.

Early research and development works serve as the engineering design basis used today to design and manufacture CarbonCast.

== Operations ==
AltusGroup emerged from a development initiative between Oldcastle Precast and Chomarat North America, formerly TechFab, LLC and operates under the concept of co-opetition. Member companies collaborate and share information to advance the development and marketing of CarbonCast and other technologies, but compete for jobs through the conventional sales and bidding process.

Its member companies place volunteer representatives on committees that oversee the policies and function of the organization:

- Board of Directors – appointed officials establish an overall strategy for organization and set policies for the management of the enterprise
- Marketing – a committee handles communications and maintains national marketing initiatives for new product sales opportunities at each of the companies.
- Technical – a technical committee oversees the use of the technology in the plant and field to establish best practices and test results for all products developed and marketed.

The organization celebrated its 20th year of operation in 2023, noting that CarbonCast technology had been used on more than 2,500 projects representing 35 million square feet of surface area since its introduction.

== Members ==
- High Concrete Group LLC
- Metromont Corporation
- Knife River
- GPRM Prestress
- Enterprise Precast Concrete, Inc.
- Wells
- Chomarat North America
- Mid-States Concrete Industries
- Strescon Limited
- MPS Precast
- Molin
- Spring Valley
- C-concrete (international member)
