= Alto, Wisconsin =

- Town
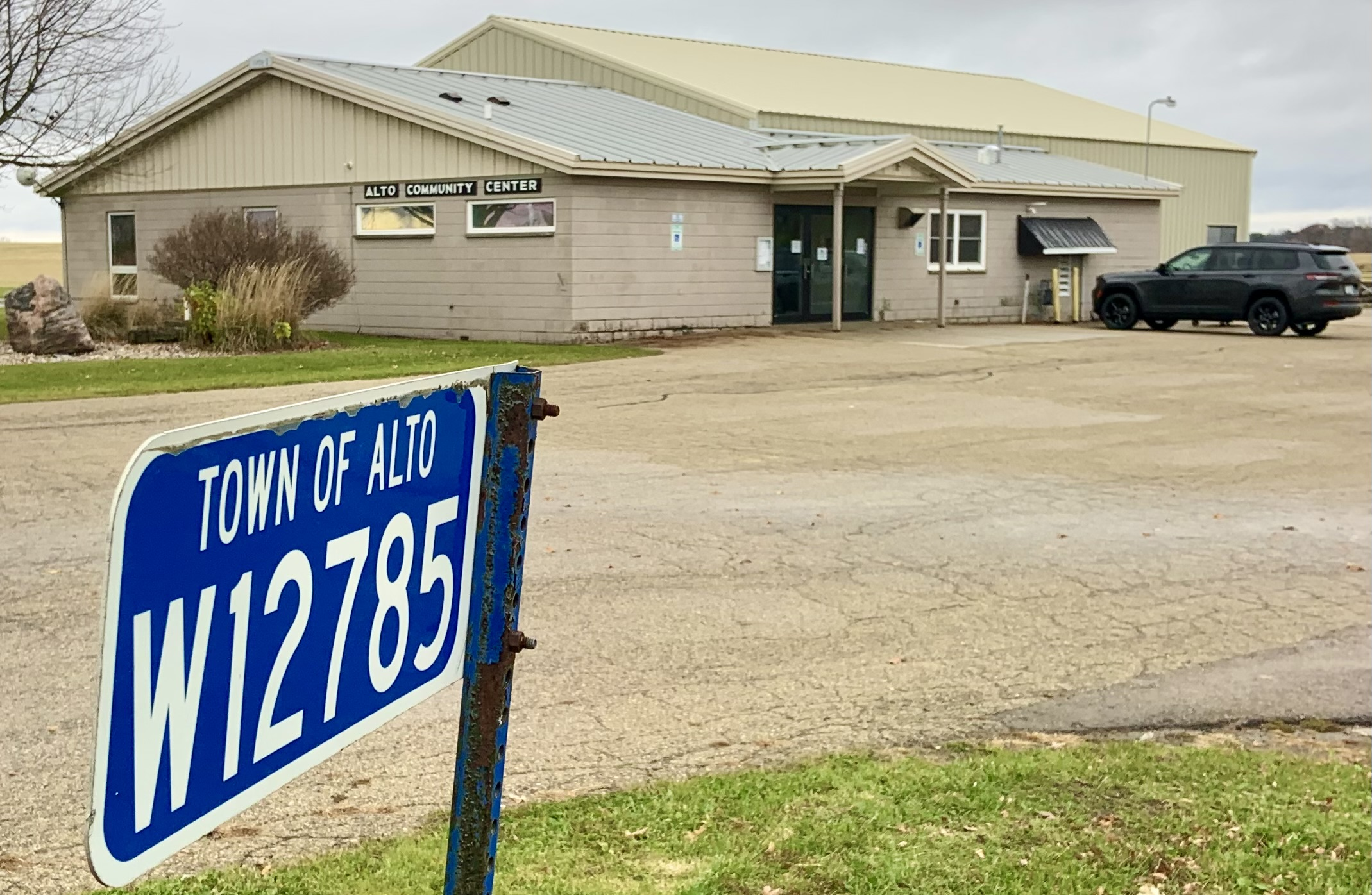
- Town hall

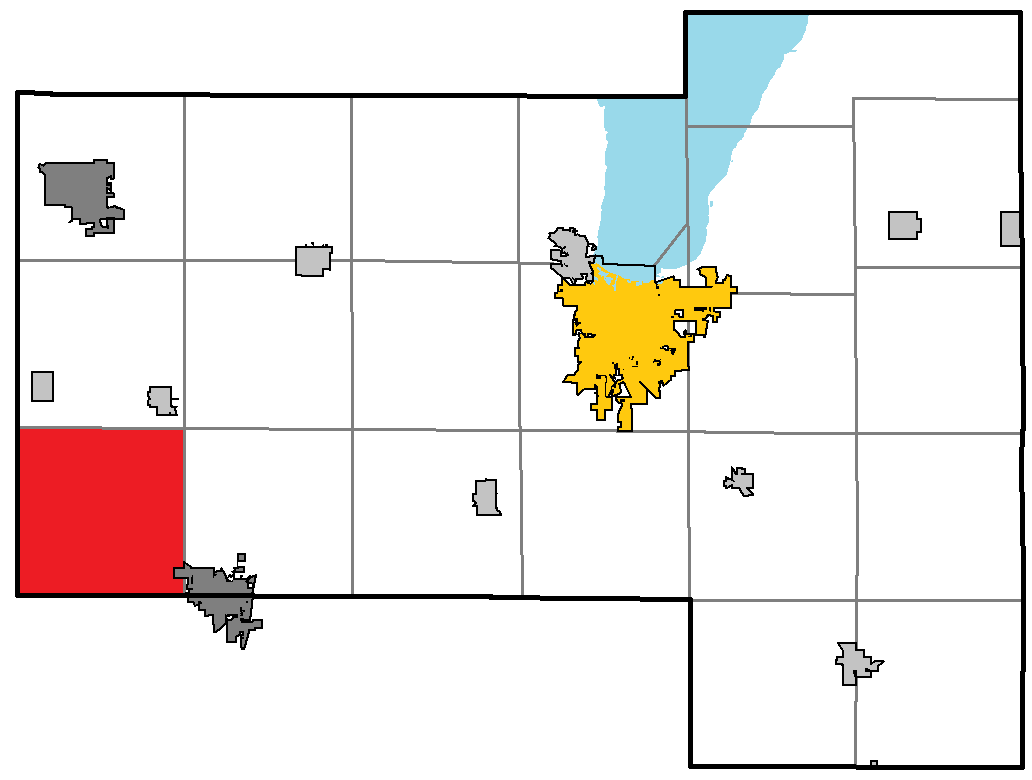
- Location of Alto, within Fond du Lac County
- Coordinates: 43°41′28″N 88°49′49″W
- Country: United States
- State: Wisconsin
- County: Fond du Lac

Area
  - Total: 36.3 sq mi (94.0 km^{2})
  - Land: 36.3 sq mi (94.0 km^{2})
  - Water: 0 sq mi (0.0 km^{2})
- Elevation: 935 ft (285 m)

Population (2020)
  - Total: 1,055
  - Density: 29.1/sq mi (11.2/km^{2})
- Time zone: UTC-6 (Central (CST))
  - Summer (DST): UTC-5 (CDT)
- Area code: 920
- FIPS code: 55-01525
- GNIS feature ID: 1582684
- Website: https://townofalto.com/

Alto is a town in Fond du Lac County, Wisconsin, United States. The population was 1,055 at the 2020 census. The unincorporated community of Alto is located in the town.

== Geography ==
According to the United States Census Bureau, the town has a total area of 36.3 square miles (94.0 km^{2}), all land.

== History ==
Most of the early settlers of Alto were from Gelderland in The Netherlands.

== Demographics ==
At the 2000 census, there were 1,103 people, 344 households, and 306 families living in the town. The population density was 30.4 people per square mile (11.7/km^{2}). There were 353 housing units at an average density of 9.7 per square mile (3.8/km^{2}). The racial makeup of the town was 99.37% White, 0.36% Asian, 0.27% from other races. Hispanic or Latino people of any race were 0.73%.

Of the 344 households 48.3% had children under the age of 18 living with them, 84.9% were married couples living together, 2.0% had a female householder with no husband present, and 10.8% were non-families. 9.0% of households were one person and 3.8% were one person aged 65 or older. The average household size was 3.21 and the average family size was 3.44.

The age distribution was 32.7% under the age of 18, 7.8% from 18 to 24, 30.3% from 25 to 44, 18.3% from 45 to 64, and 10.9% 65 or older. The median age was 34 years. For every 100 females, there were 109.7 males. For every 100 females age 18 and over, there were 113.8 males.

The median household income was $53,235 and the median family income was $54,911. Males had a median income of $33,487 versus $21,484 for females. The per capita income for the town was $17,872. About 2.3% of families and 2.3% of the population were below the poverty line, including 0.6% of those under age 18 and 5.8% of those age 65 or over.

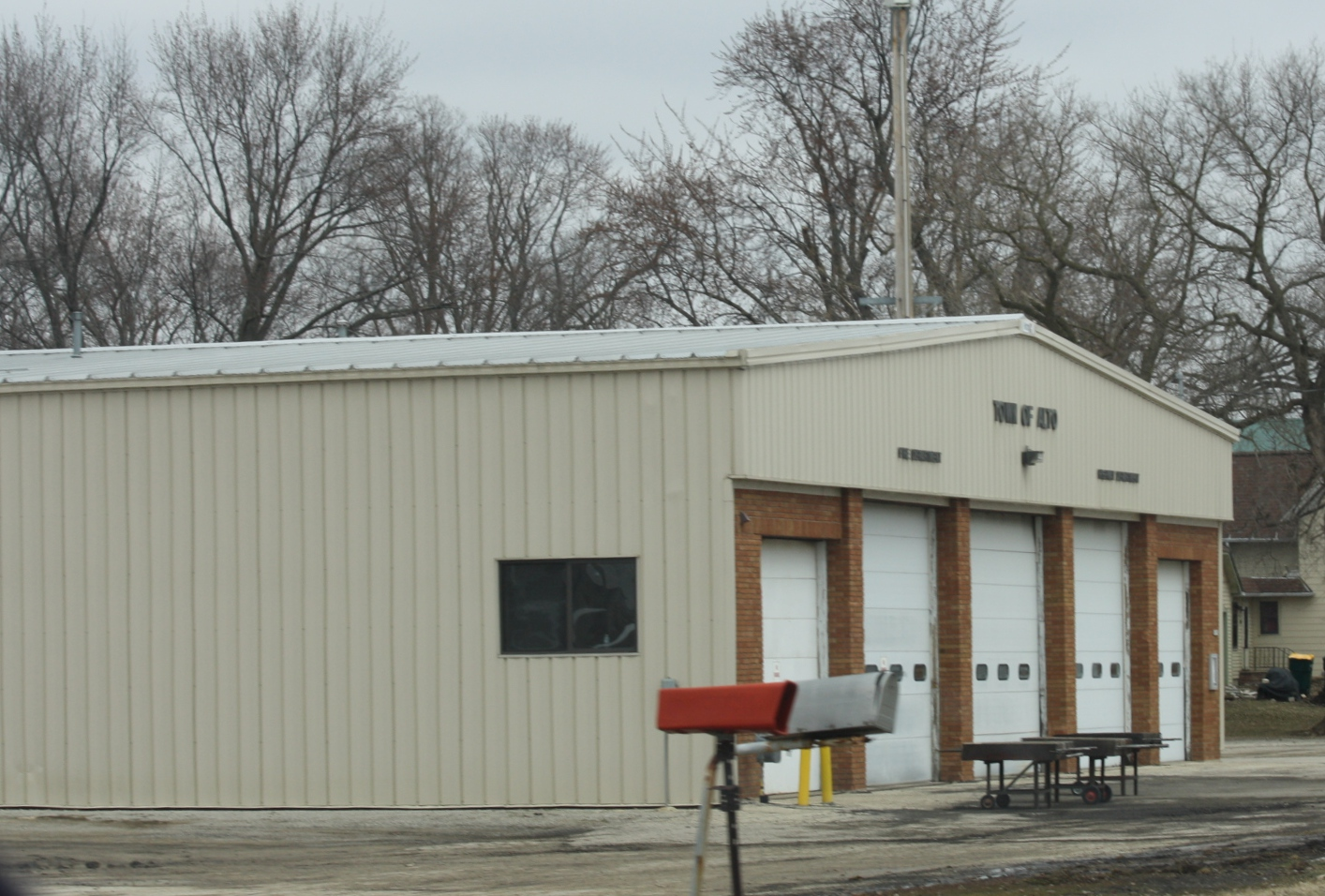
Town of Alto fire department

== Politics ==
Alto city vote by party in presidential elections
Year	Democratic	Republican	Third parties
2016	11.39% 68	84.76% 506	3.85% 23
2012	24.23% 150	75.12% 465	0.65% 4
2008	17.72% 73	82.28% 339	0.00% 0
2004	15.28% 94	84.72% 521	0.00% 0
2000	18.82% 105	81.18% 453	0.00% 0
1996	26.22% 97	73.78% 273	0.00% 0
1992	10.07% 54	73.13% 392	16.79% 90
1988	12.85% 64	87.15% 434	0.00% 0
1984	8.15% 44	91.85% 496	0.00% 0
1980	11.08% 71	88.14% 565	0.78% 5
1976	18.82% 108	80.84% 464	0.35% 2
