= Alto (community), Wisconsin =

Alto, Wisconsin
- Unincorporated community
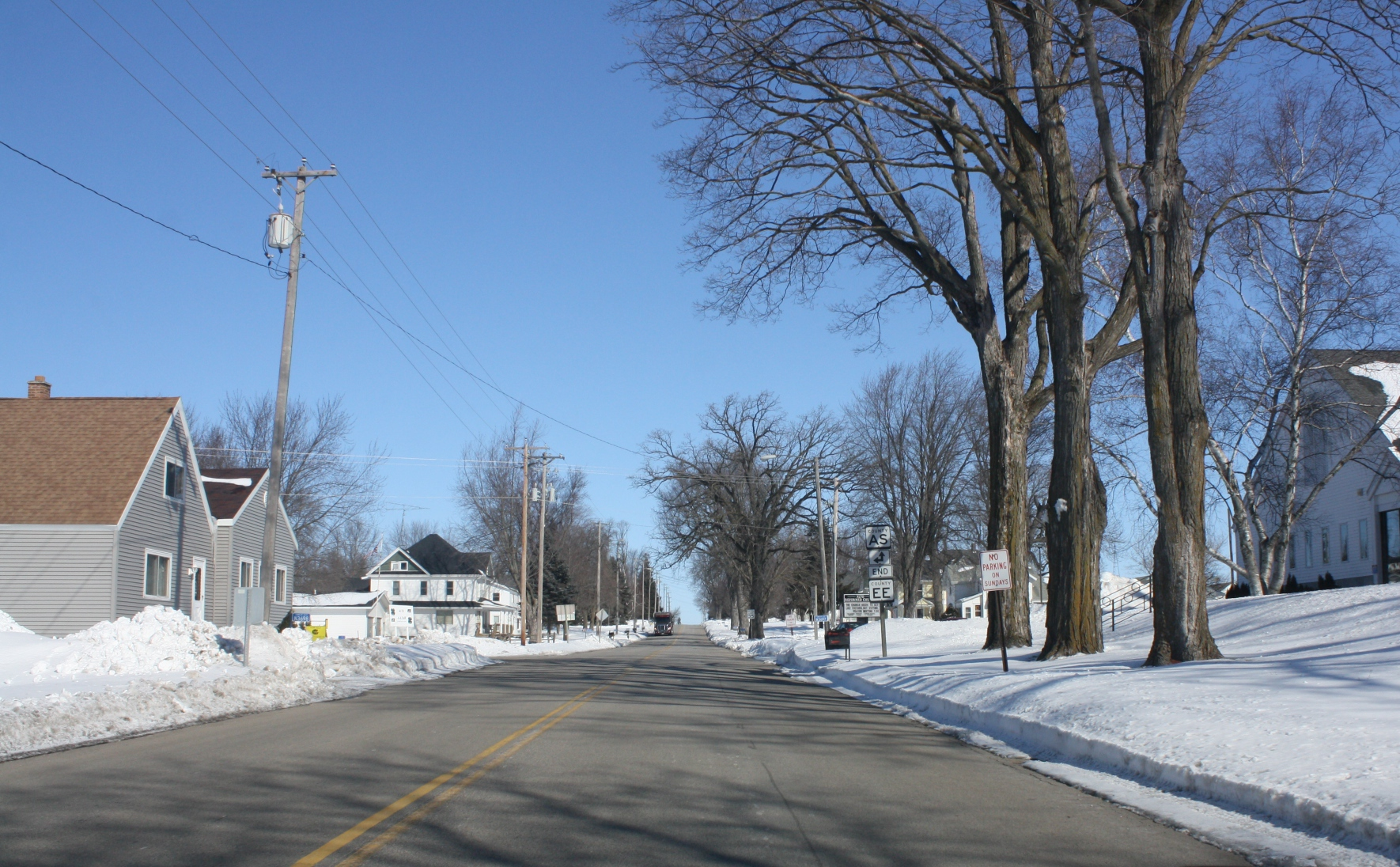
- Looking north in downtown Alto

- Location within Wisconsin Location within the United States
- Coordinates: 43°40′36″N 88°47′42″W
- Country: United States
- State: Wisconsin
- County: Fond du Lac
- Elevation: 945 ft (288 m)
- Time zone: UTC-6 (Central (CST))
  - Summer (DST): UTC-5 (CDT)
- Area code: 920
- GNIS feature ID: 1560805

Alto is an unincorporated community located in the town of Alto, Fond du Lac County, Wisconsin, United States.

== Alto Fair ==
For two days every year in early August, the Alto 4-H club and Farm Bureau sponsor a county fair-style event. The Alto Fair starts on a Wednesday and ends the following day, allegedly because a weekend fair would discourage children from attending church services. The fair includes events such as 4-H judging, a tractor pull, and country breakfasts each morning of the fair.

== Geography ==
According to the United States Census Bureau, the town has a total area of 36.3 square miles (94.0 km²), all land.

== Images ==
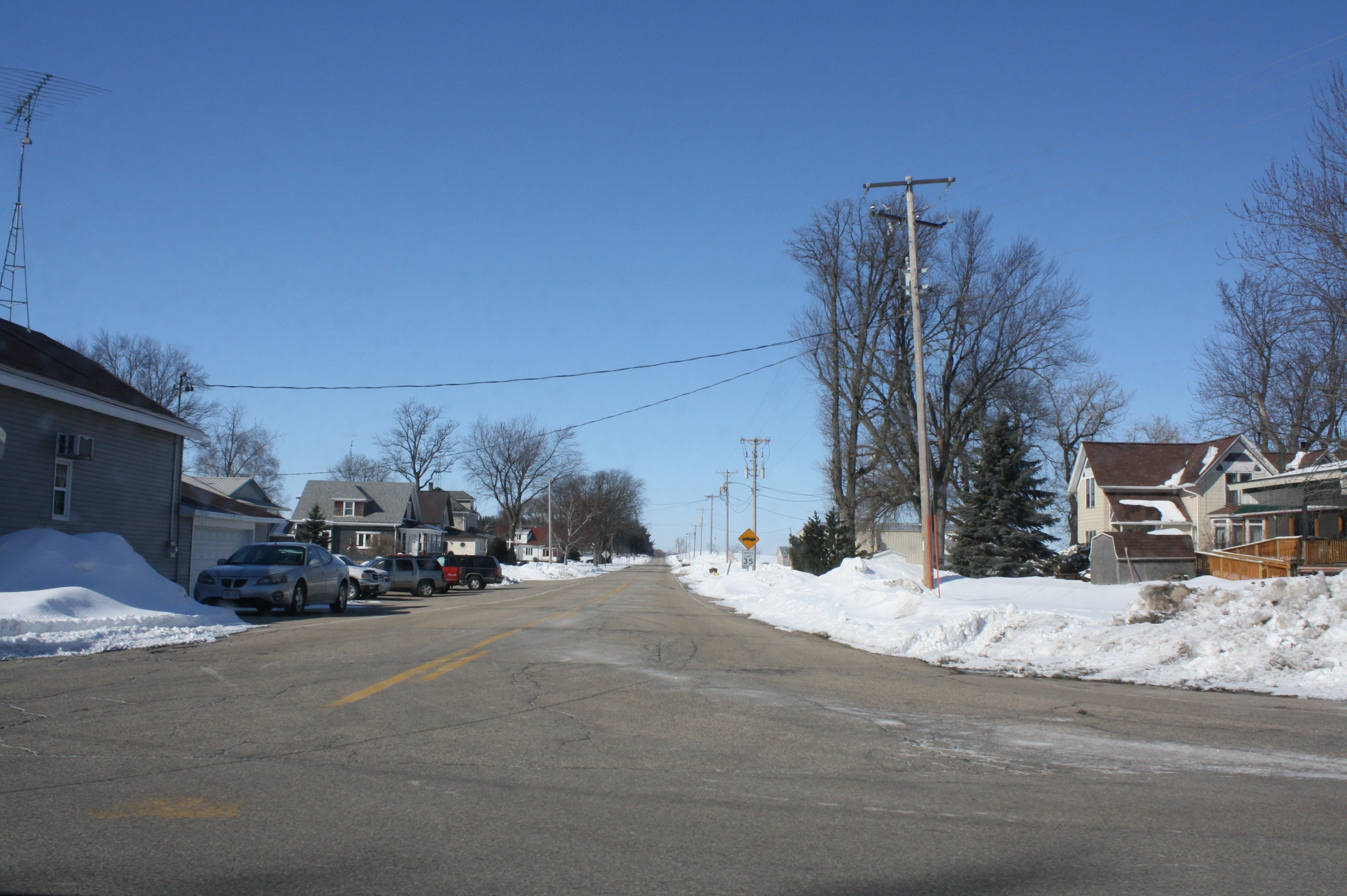
Looking west in downtown Alto

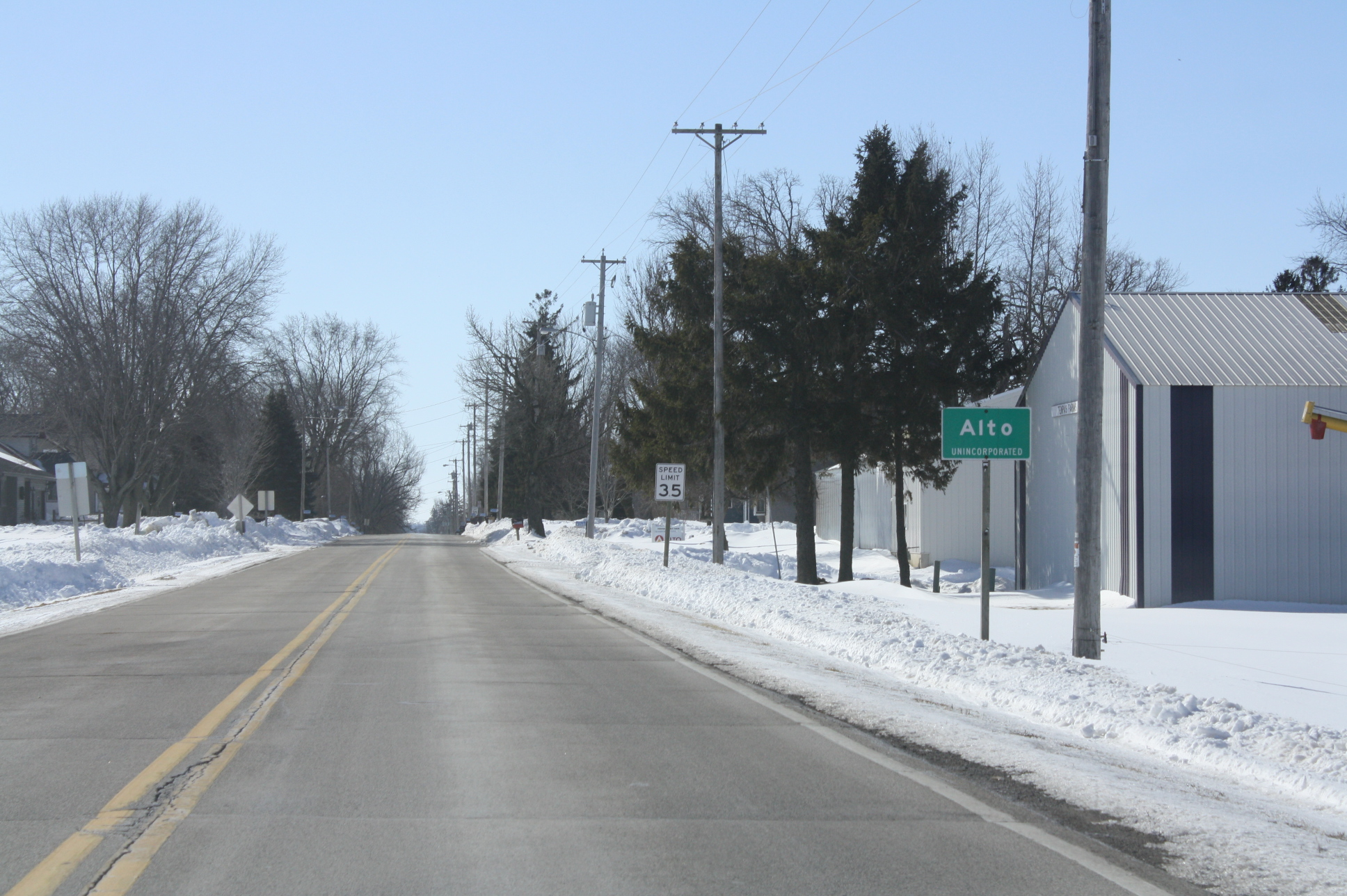
Sign on County AS

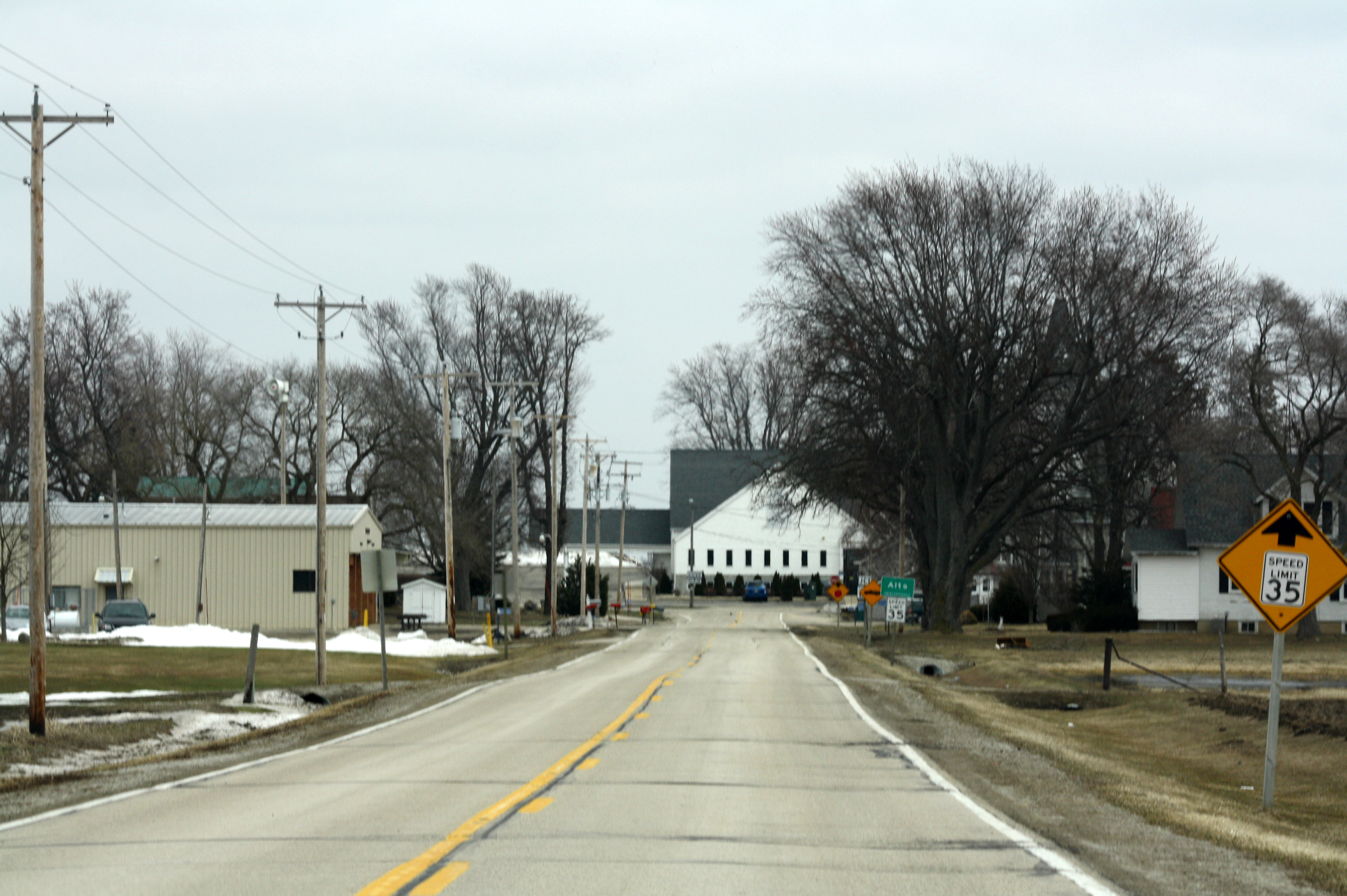
Looking east at Alto
