= Alto do Coqueirinho =

Neighborhood of Salvador, Bahia

Coordinates: 12°56′26″S 38°22′22″W

- Neighborhood
- Interactive map of Alto do Coqueirinho
- City: Salvador
- State: Bahia

Alto do Coqueirinho (pronounced [ˈawtu du kokejˈɾiɲu]) is a Brazilian neighbourhood located in the city of Salvador, capital of the state of Bahia.

== Demographics ==
It was listed as one of the least dangerous neighborhoods in Salvador, according to data from the Brazilian Institute of Geography and Statistics (IBGE) and the Public Security Secretariat (SSP) published on the neighborhood-by-neighborhood violence map by the newspaper Correio in 2012. It was among the most peaceful neighborhoods as a result of the homicide rate for every hundred thousand inhabitants per year (with UN reference) having reached the second lowest level, with the indicator "1-30", being one of the best neighborhoods on the list.

The neighborhood belongs to Administrative Region X (Dec) - "Itapuã".
