= Kentucky Camp, Arizona =

- Kentucky Camp Historic District
- U.S. National Register of Historic Places
- U.S. Historic district
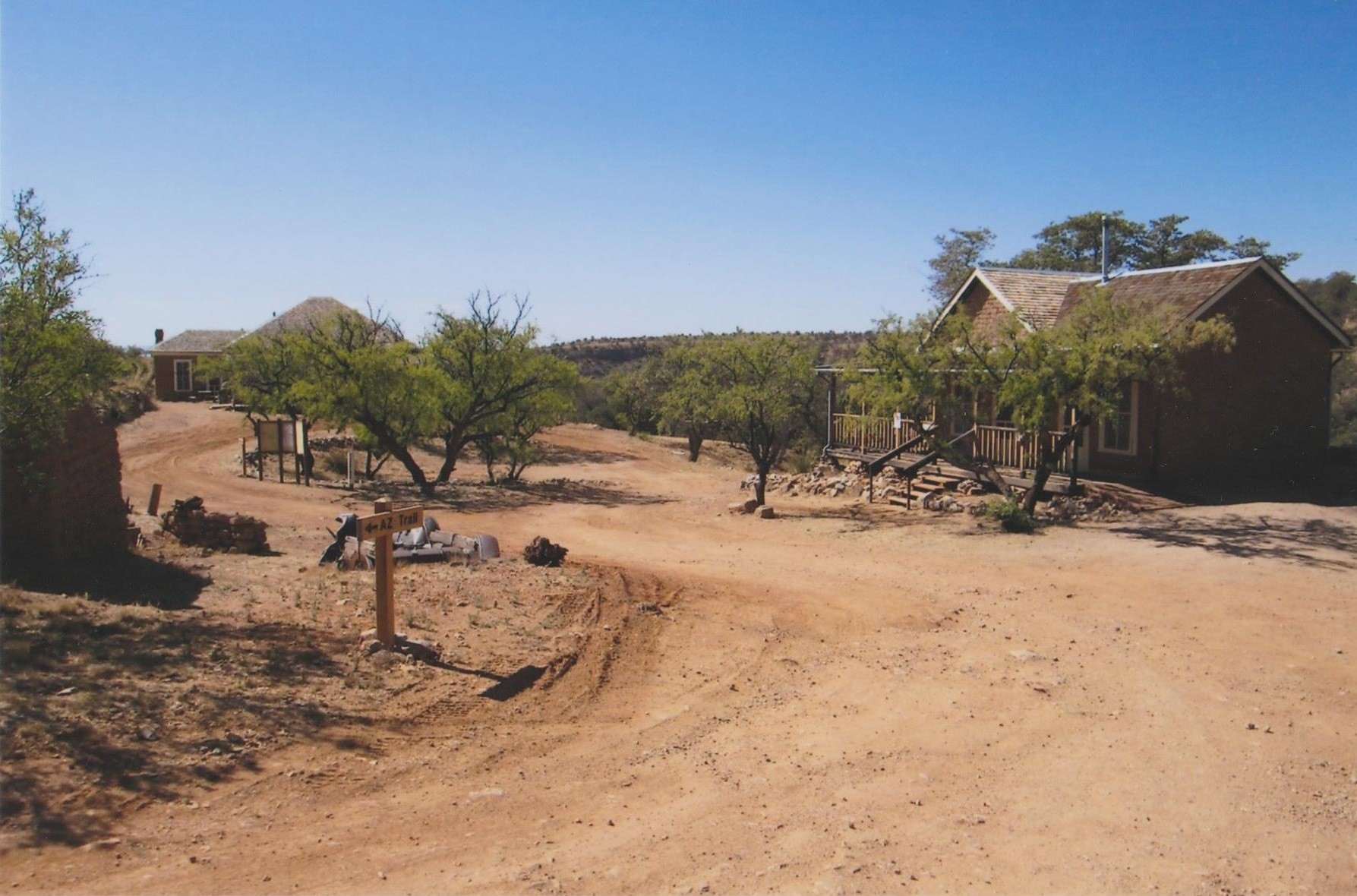
- Kentucky Camp in 2014.

- Location within Arizona Location within the United States
- Location: Santa Rita Mountains, Arizona, USA
- Nearest city: Sonoita, Arizona
- Coordinates: 31°44′40″N 110°44′31″W
- Area: 340 acres (140 ha)
- Built: 1905
- Architect: George B. McAneny; James B. Stetson
- NRHP reference No.: 95001312
- Added to NRHP: November 22, 1995

Kentucky Camp is a ghost town and former mining camp along the Arizona Trail in Pima County, Arizona, United States, near the community of Sonoita. The Kentucky Camp Historic District is listed on the National Register of Historic Places and has been since 1995. As it is located within Coronado National Forest, the United States Forest Service is responsible for the upkeep of the remaining buildings within the Kentucky Camp Historic District.

== History ==
A freak accident that killed a mining engineer allowed Kentucky Camp to persist as it is today, a scenic canyon dotted with mesquites, oaks, tall grasses and cacti. The plans for the Kentucky Camp area in the realm of gold mining were ambitious but never really came to fruition.

=== Early days ===
In 1874 gold was discovered on the eastern slope of the Santa Rita Mountains. The area became known as the Greaterville mining district and proved to be one of the richest placer deposits in southern Arizona. Placer deposits consist of a mixture of gold, sand and gravel; to separate the substances, water is required. Generally, water is readily available to wash the mixture of sand, gravel, and gold. However, the arroyos of the Santa Rita Mountains are dry. Miners were required to haul the sacks of dirt to the few running streams in the area. Sometimes they would carry packed water, in canvas and goatskin bags, on the backs of burros to their claims. By 1886, much of the rich deposits that were worth such an effort were worked out and many miners gave up and moved on.

In 1902 a California mining engineer, James Stetson, had an idea to solve the water problem. His scheme involved channeling seasonal runoff from the mountain streams into a reservoir that would hold enough water to last ten months allowing him to keep a mine in operation. Stetson was able to convince a wealthy Californian, George McAneny (not to be confused with New Yorker George McAneny), to invest in his plan and with other investors from Tucson they formed the Santa Rita Water and Mining Company. The pair prospected the area of Greaterville and finally settled on a mining site in Boston Gulch. The headquarters was set up at nearby Kentucky Gulch and from 1902 until 1906, the buildings at Kentucky Camp served as the offices and residences for the mine employees.

By mid-1904, the company's water system was complete and they were doing hydraulic mining at Kentucky Camp.

=== The fall of a camp and engineer ===
One day before a meeting with stockholders in 1905 tragedy befell Stetson. He was killed in a fall from a window at the Santa Rita Hotel in Tucson. His partner's finances and health deteriorated and despite the effort of the other partners to keep the operation going, Kentucky Camp was abandoned by 1912.

=== The town after 1912 ===
The buildings and land were purchased by an attorney for the McAneny family and until the 1960s the lands were used as a cattle ranch. During the 1960s the land was sold to ANAMAX Mining. The Forest Service acquired the land in 1989 and added it to the Coronado National Forest. The Forest Service is currently working with volunteers and others to preserve and interpret Kentucky Camp as a historic site related to mining in the American west.

== Kentucky Camp today ==
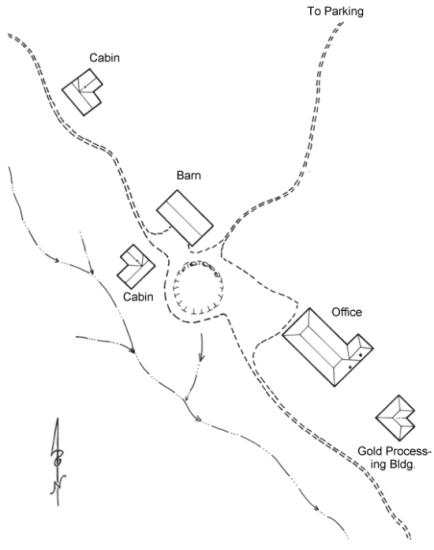
The layout of Kentucky Camp's remaining buildings.

The town was acquired by the U.S. Forest Service in 1989 through a land exchange. Since that time, it has been part of the Coronado National Forest and is being preserved and interpreted for a look at mining camp life.

=== Buildings ===
Today there are five adobe buildings at the town site. They were constructed circa 1904 and the largest building was probably the headquarters for the Santa Rita Water and Mining Company. Later, that same large building became the main ranch house as the land was used for cattle ranching. The small building behind the headquarters building was used to process gold samples, evidenced by liners that came from an assay furnace. Opposite a small house where Stetson may have lived are the remains of a ruined barn and another small adobe house remains at the far end of the site.

=== Preservation ===
Historic preservation has been underway at Kentucky Camp since 1991. The Forest Service has worked to stabilize the remaining buildings, including repairing roofs and walls in hopes of preventing further deterioration. Much of the work has been done by volunteers under the auspices of the Forest Service's Passport In Time program and the Friends of Kentucky Camp.

When the USFS acquired the property the buildings were in bad shape. The roofs had to be repaired first to keep water run off from contacting the crumbling adobe walls. The project was made possible by a $10,000 donation from the producers of the 1989-1992 TV show The Young Riders, which happened to be shooting in the area.

As of 2005 the Forest Service planned to restore the buildings to their original appearance during the mining era.

== Gallery ==
This sketch of George McAneny is from a 1905 San Jose newspaper. He lost more than $150,000 investing in Kentucky Camp.

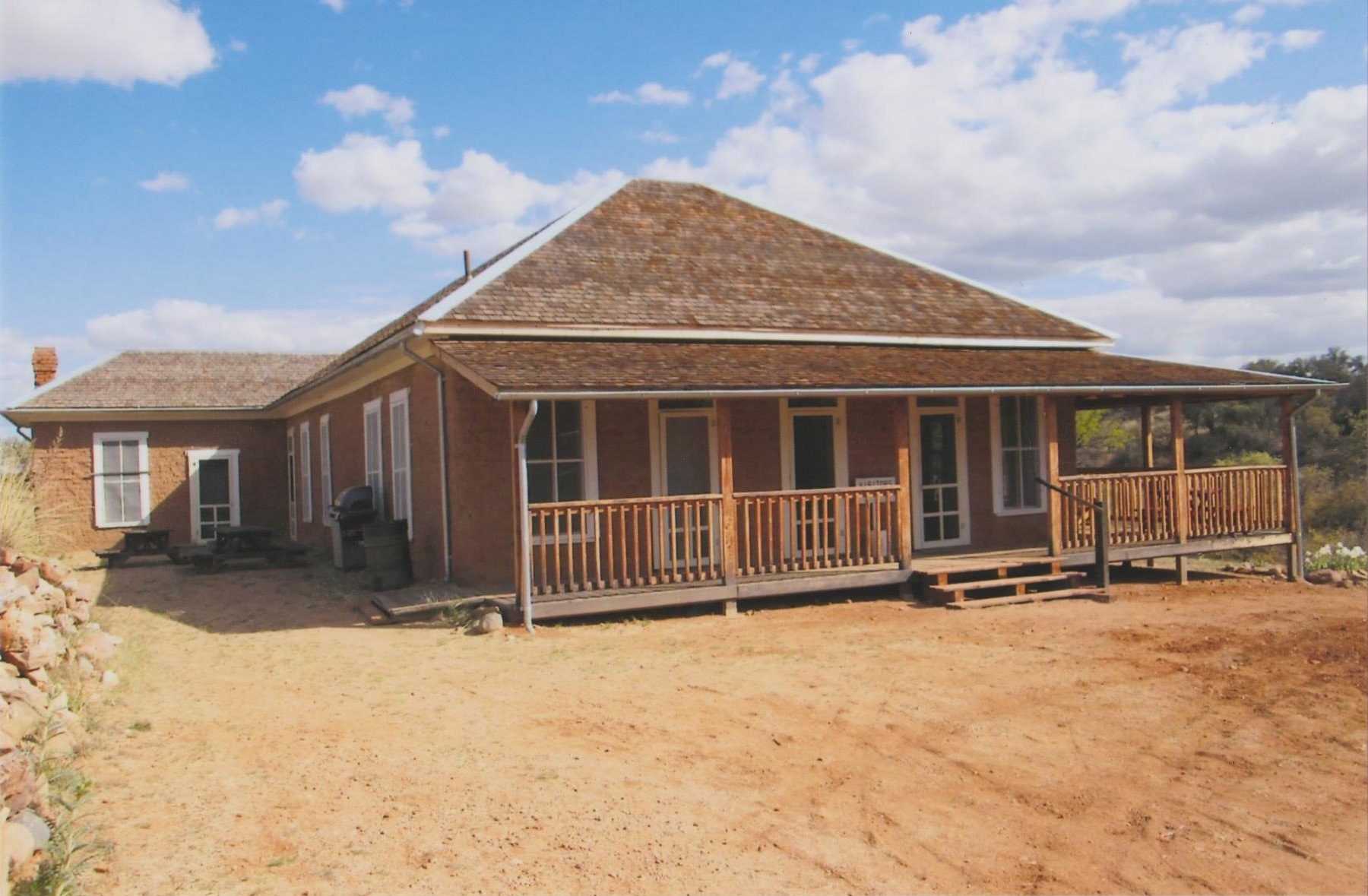
The front of the hotel/office building.

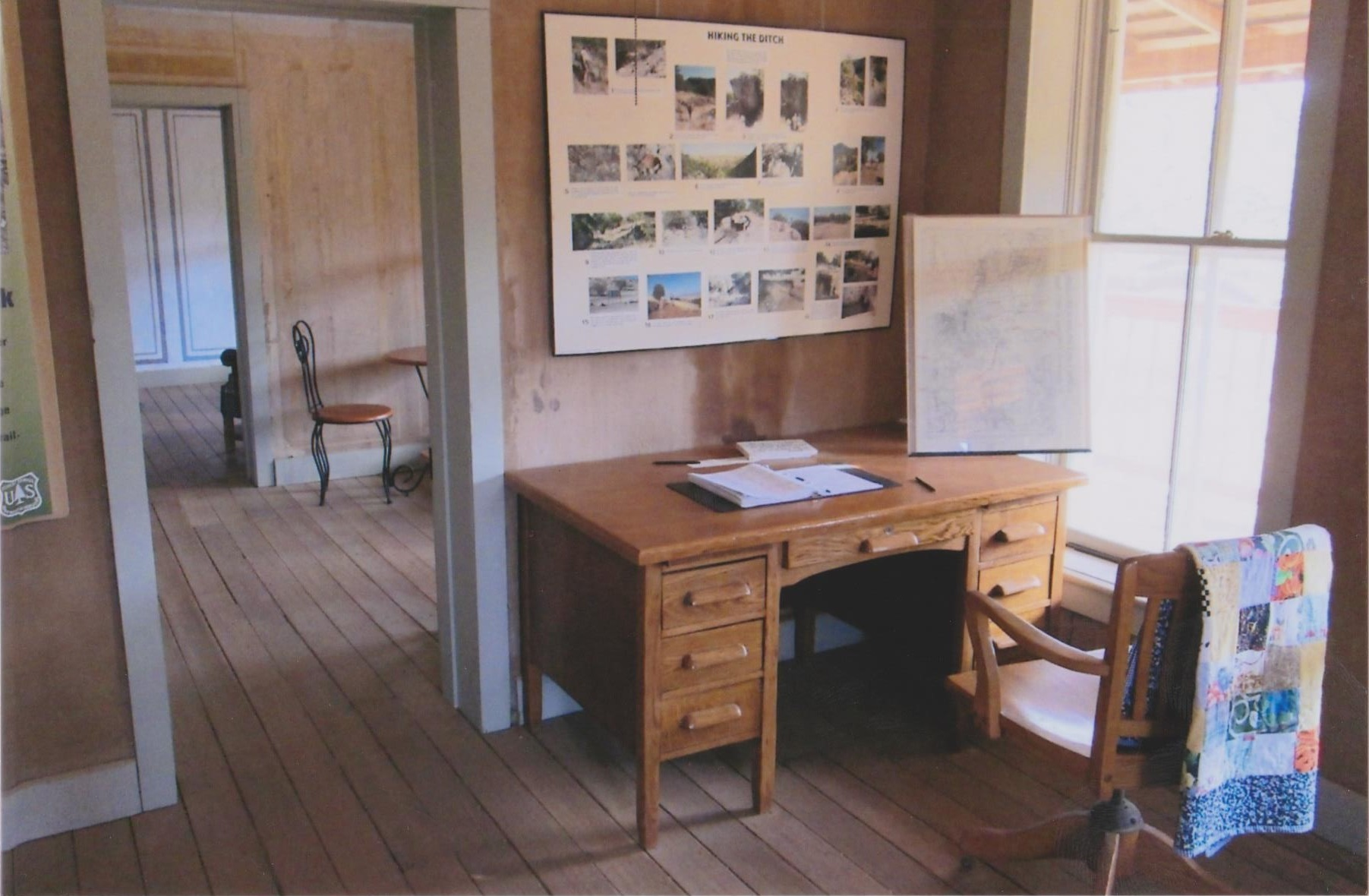
Inside the hotel/office building.

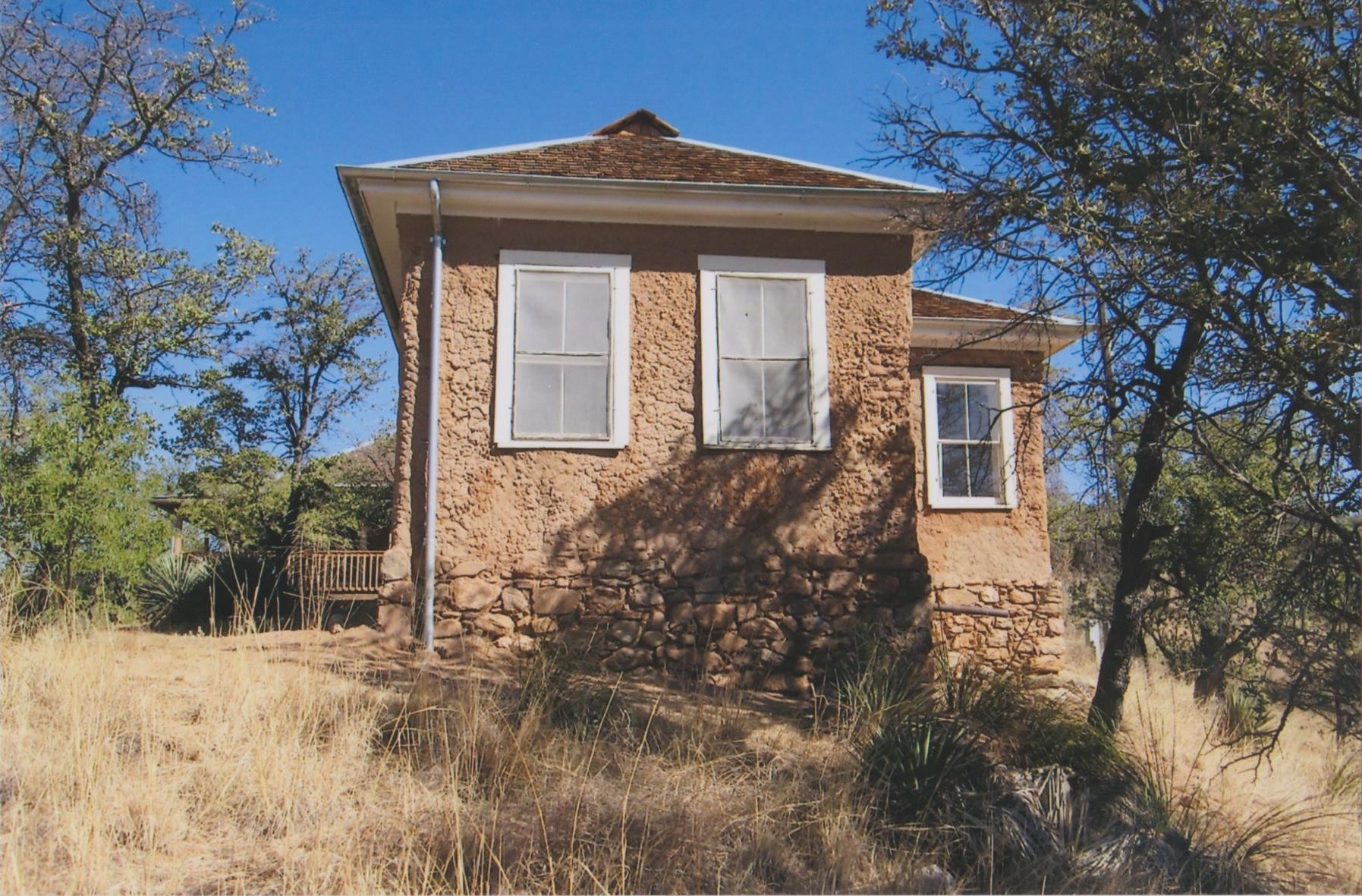
The assay office, where gold ore was processed.

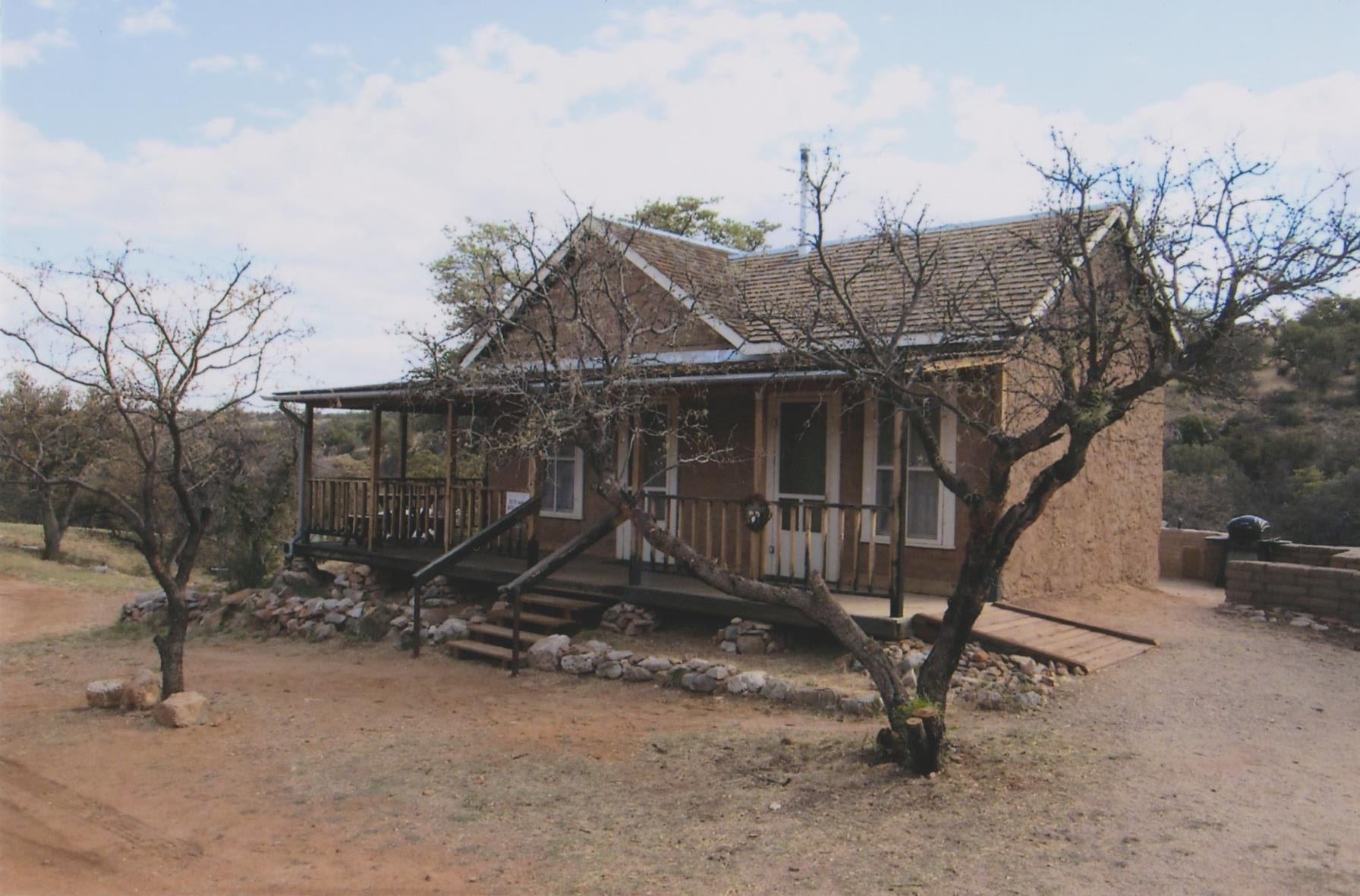
The adobe house believed to have been occupied by James Stetson.

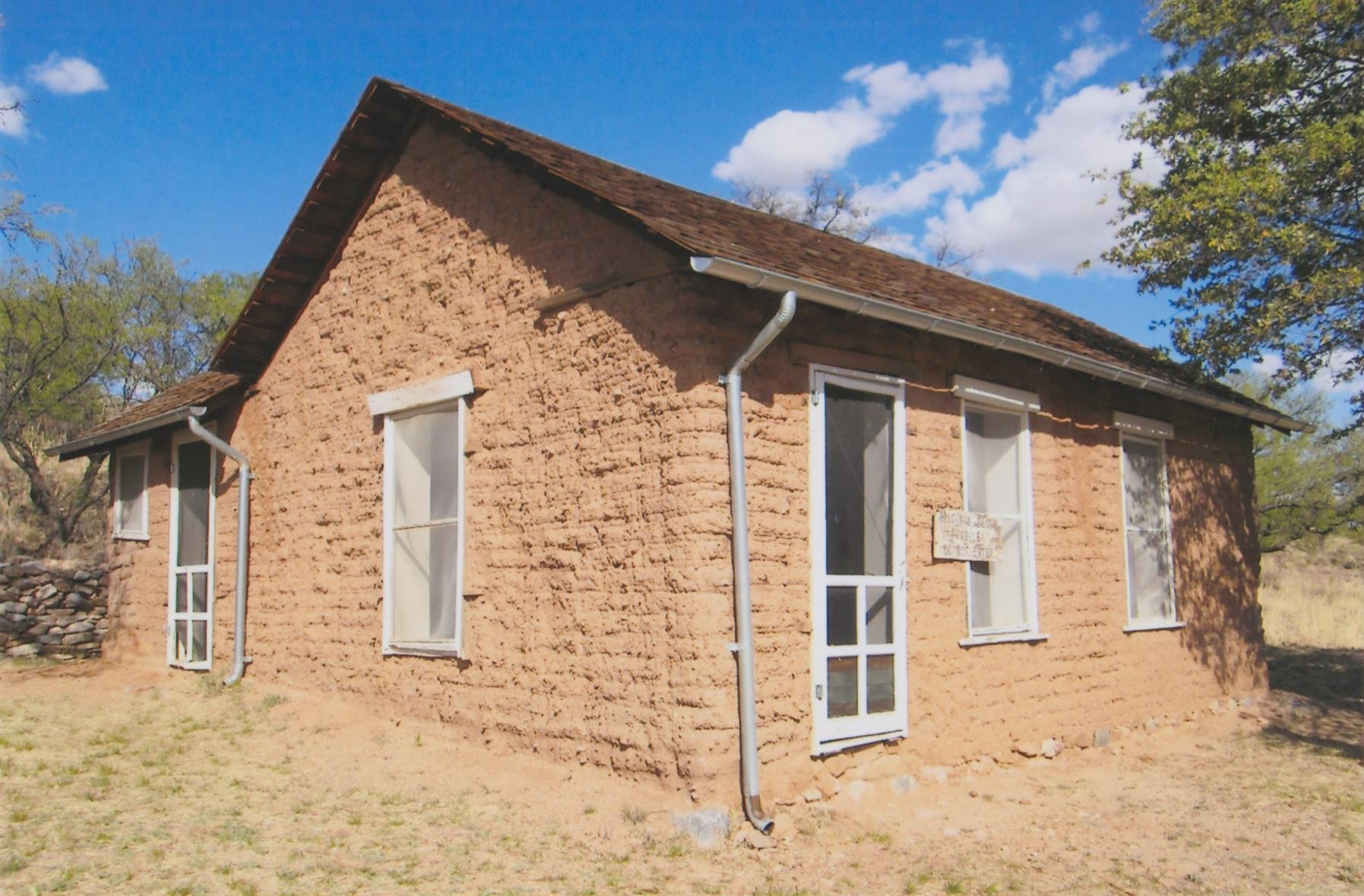
The other adobe house.

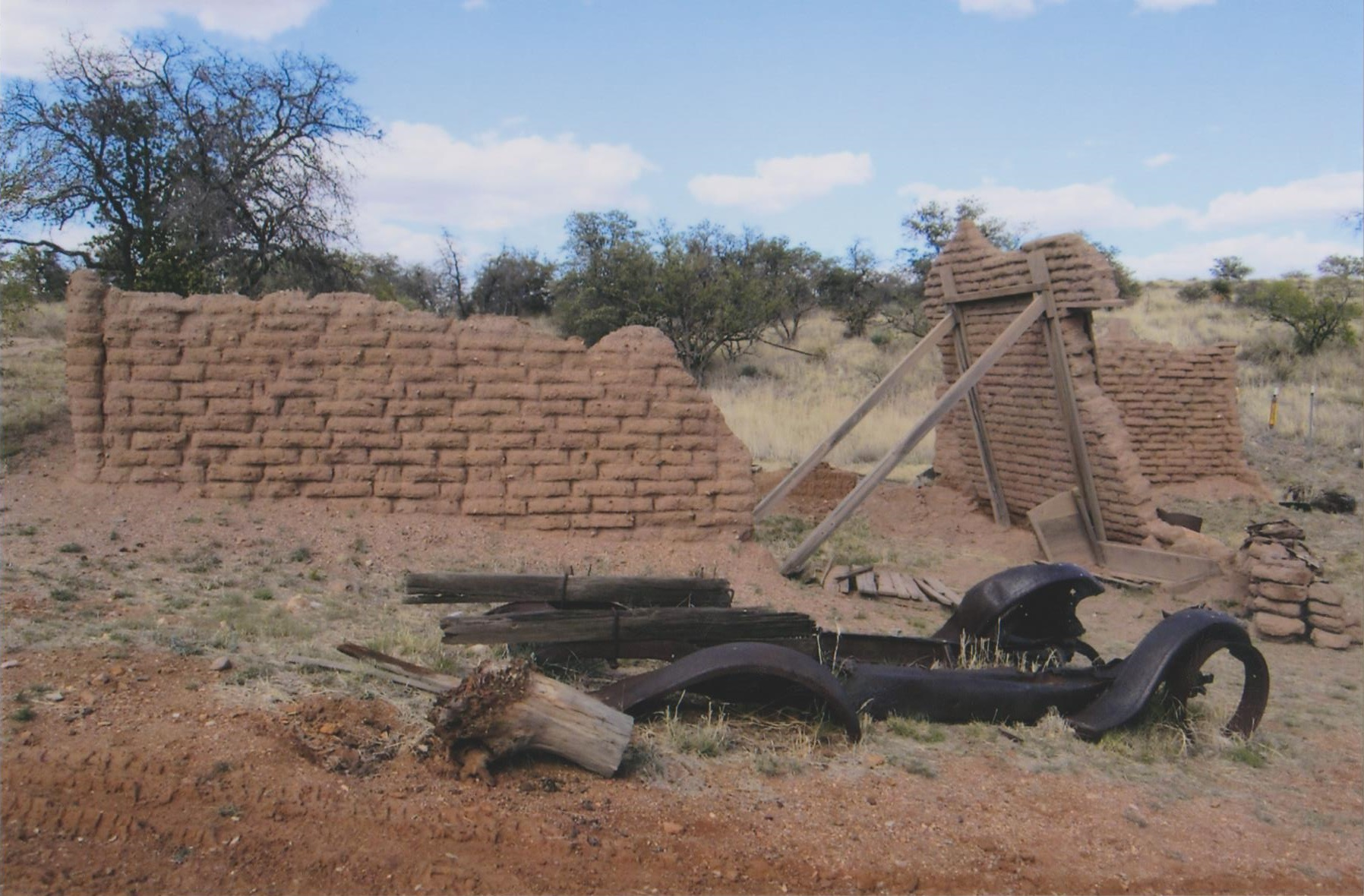
The remains of an adobe barn and an early automobile.

== See also ==
- Empire Ranch
- National Register of Historic Places listings in Pima County, Arizona
